= Donna Benjamin =

Australian open source activist

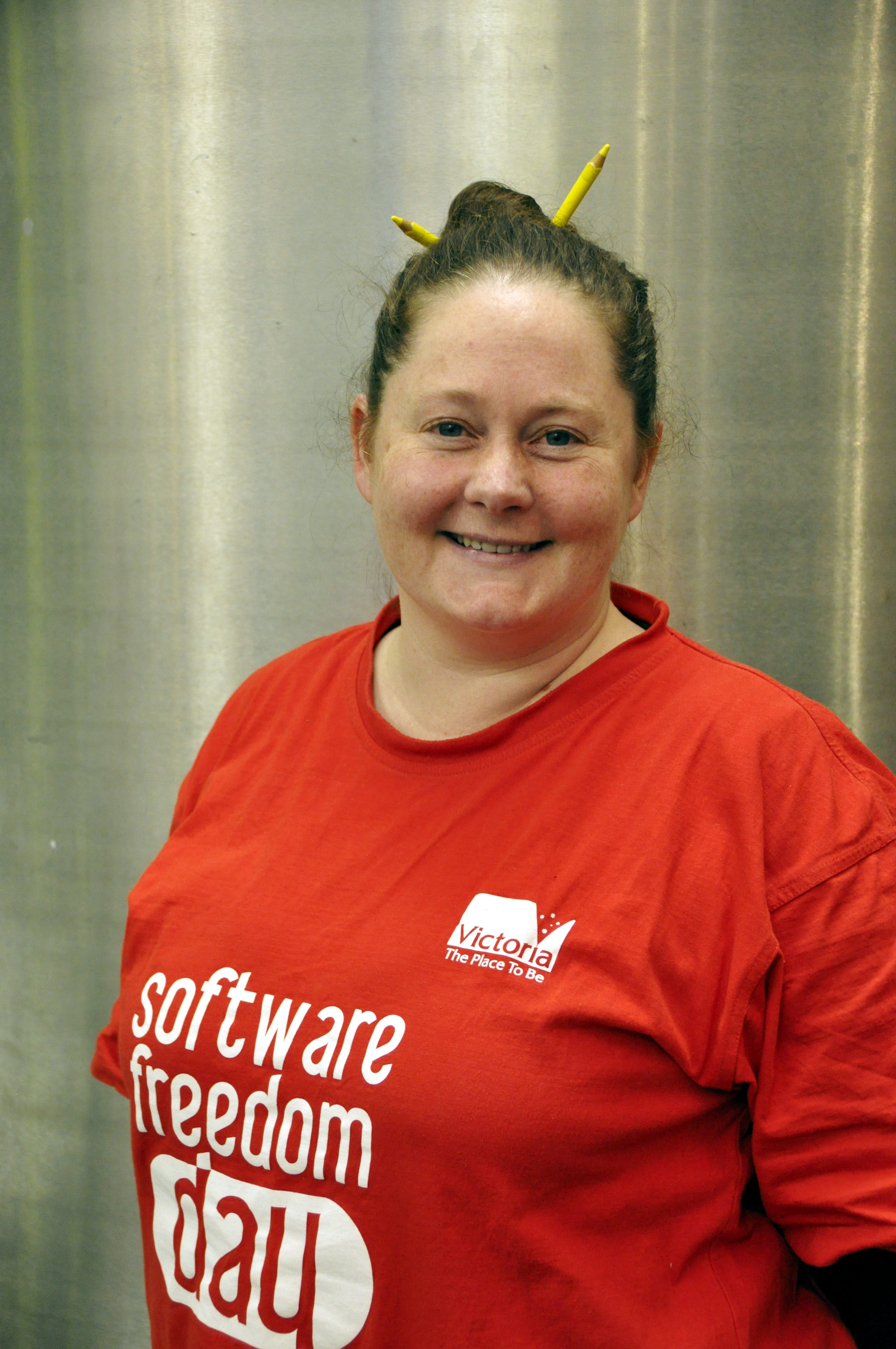
Benjamin at Software Freedom Day, 2010

Donna Benjamin is an Australian open source community contributor, commentator and advocate. Recognised for her leadership and advocacy in the Free and Open Source Software (FOSS) movement, Benjamin has contributed to the development of open source communities in Australia and internationally.

Benjamin was the lead organiser of the volunteer run linux.conf.au conference in Melbourne in 2008. She regularly ran the Community Leadership Summit X at LCA (clsXlca), a workshop focussing on community development in open source projects, as well as community summits at DrupalCon.

In 2011 she organised a crowdfunding campaign called Digitise The Dawn, which successfully raised funds to digitise The Dawn, an early feminist journal published in Australia between 1888 and 1905.

She has held a range of leadership roles in the open source community, such as:

- Product owner and maintainer, Open Practice Library (2021 - Present)
- Director, Open Australia Foundation (2016–2018)
- Board Member, The Drupal Association (2012–2018)
- Advisory Board Member, The Ada Initiative, (2011–2012)
- President, Linux Users of Victoria (2008–2010)
- Director, Open Source Industry Australia (2006–2008)
- Education Spokesperson, Open Source Victoria (2005–2010)
- Media Contact, AussieChix / OWOOT, the Australian chapter of Linuxchix (2007-2014)

== Recognition ==
In 2012 she received the Rusty Wrench Award from Linux Australia in recognition of her contributions.

In 2022 she was awarded the People’s Choice Award for Community Management from OpenSource.com

== Career ==
Donna Benjamin is the Executive Director of a micro-business called Creative Contingencies, which specialises in facilitation, research, web services, and event management. Since 2019, she has served as Senior Engagement Lead at Red Hat’s Open Innovation Labs, where she helps organisations adopt open source and agile practices. Prior to this, she worked at Catalyst IT as a project lead, and business analyst.
