= Open Source Developers' Conference =

The Open Source Developers' Conference (OSDC) was a non-profit conference for developers of open-source software. It was started in Australia in 2004, and later expanded to Israel, Taiwan, Malaysia, France and Norway, where conferences began in 2006, 2007, 2009, 2009 and 2015, respectively. No further conferences have been held since 2015.

The conference was open to talks about software developed for any platform or operating system so long as the talk was of interest to open-source developers. Talks about closed source projects which used open-source languages or open-source projects which used close source languages were accepted. Talks have covered languages such as Perl, Python, PHP, Ruby, Groovy, Scala, Java, Mono and C. Other talks have covered open-source tools such as databases and revision control systems or meta-topics such as talk presentation hints, and working with others.

== History ==
The conference was founded by Scott Penrose and first organised by members of the Melbourne Perl Mongers group in Melbourne, Australia in 2004. Originally it had been intended to be a YAPC-style (Perl) conference, but after discussions with the Melbourne PHP Users Group it was expanded to include PHP and Python talks. Following the 2004 conference's success, Scott Penrose created the Open Source Developers' Club Association to encourage programmers of other languages to also be involved in running the conference. At first this was an entirely Melbourne based organisation, but after the 2005 conference, it expanded to include members from elsewhere in Australia. At the end of 2006, control of running the conference for 2007 was given to a group in Brisbane, with the Open Source Developers' Club Association committee members taking the role of overseers.

In 2013 the Open Source Developers' Club Association awarded the running of the event to a team in Auckland New Zealand, further expanding the conference with an Australasian focus.

== OSDC Australia ==
=== Locations ===
Conference site	Dates	City	Venue
OSDC2015 Australia	27–29 October 2015	Hobart, Australia	Wrest Point
OSDC2014 Australia	4–7 November 2014	Gold Coast, Australia	Griffith University
OSDC2013 NZ	21–21 October 2013	Auckland, New Zealand	Langham Hotel, Auckland
OSDC2012 Australia	4–7 December 2012	Sydney	University of Technology Sydney
OSDC2011 Australia	14–18 November 2011	Canberra, Australia	Australian National University
OSDC2010 Australia	24–26 November 2010	Melbourne, Australia	Abbotsford Convent
OSDC2009 Australia	25–27 November 2009	Brisbane, Australia	Bardon Conference Center
OSDC2008 Australia	2–5 December 2008	Sydney	Sydney Masonic Centre
OSDC2007 Australia	26–29 November 2007	Brisbane, Australia	Royal on the Park Hotel
OSDC2006 Australia	5–8 December 2006	Melbourne, Australia	Monash University Caulfield campus
OSDC2005 Australia	5–7 December 2005	Melbourne, Australia	Monash University Caulfield campus
OSDC2004 Australia	1–3 December 2004	Melbourne, Australia	Monash University Caulfield campus

=== Keynotes ===
- 2015
  - Dr. Maia Sauren (video)
  - Mark Elwell: Climbing the Garden Wall – An Educator's Odyssey in Second Life and OpenSim (video)
  - Richard Tubb: Opportunities in Openness. Driving positive change in local communities (video)
  - Michael Cordover: EasyCount, freedom of information and openness (video)
  - Pia Waugh: Open source in government: lessons from the community (video)
- 2014
  - Richard Keech: Linux-based Monitoring and Control in a Sustainable House
  - Jaap van Till (2014), "Keynote", OSDC, archived from the original on 28 February 2015
  - Lynn Fine, Code for America: Using tech for improving social impact, involving community in open government, and helping governments make use of open source
  - Dr Tom Stace: The current state of quantum computing, and related open source projects
- 2011
  - Senator Kate Lundy [Parliamentary Secretary to the Prime Minister and Parliamentary Secretary for Immigration and Multicultural affairs]: Openness in government: from data to crowdsourcing
  - Jonathon Oxer: Freedom for Atoms!
  - Damian Conway: Fun with Dead Languages
  - Brian Catto [Director of Architecture and Emerging Technologies, AGIMO]: Open Source Software and the Australian Government
  - Tony Beal [Deputy General Counsel – Commercial, Australian Government Solicitor]: Legal Trips, Traps and Solutions for Open Source Software Developers
- 2010
  - Ingy döt Net: C'Dent, the Acmeism and Everyone
  - Nóirín Shirley: Baby Steps into Open Source – Incubation and Mentoring at Apache
  - Michael Schwern: How to Report a Bug
  - Damian Conway: Temporally Quaquaversal Virtual Nanomachine Programming In Multiple Topologically Connected Quantum-Relativistic Parallel Timespaces...Made Easy!
- 2009
  - Karen Pauley: Understanding Volunteers
  - Marty Pauly:
  - Dhanji Prasanna: Google Wave
- 2008
  - Anthony Baxter:
  - Chris DiBona:
  - Andrew Tridgell:
  - Larry Wall:
  - Pia Waugh:
- 2007:
  - Rusty Russell: C: A Humbling Language (opening keynote)
  - Rasmus Lerdorf: Exploring the Broken Web
  - Paul Fenwick: An Illustrated History of Failure (dinner keynote)
  - Jonathan Oxer: Software Freedom: Pragmatic Idealism?
  - Nathan Torkington : Software For The Future (closing keynote)
- 2006:
  - Randal L. Schwartz: Free software – A look back, a look ahead (opening keynote)
  - Damian Conway: The Da Vinci Codebase (dinner keynote)
  - Richard Farnsworth: Open Source Synchrotron
  - Anthony Baxter: futurepython
  - Scott Penrose: Zaltana.org (closing keynote)
- 2005
  - Anthony Baxter: How to give a good presentation (dinner keynote)
  - Audrey Tang: Introduction to Pugs: Perl 6 in Haskell
  - Jonathan Oxer: Making things Move: Finding Inappropriate Uses for Scripting Languages
  - Savio Saldanha: Oils aint Oils: A comparison of some open source and closed source databases
  - Pia and Jeff Waugh: "Untitled Keynote" (closing keynote)
- 2004
  - Damian Conway: Perl 6: OO Made Insanely Great (opening keynote)
  - Con Zymaris: Using the Open Source Methodology to Make Money from Your Software (dinner keynote)
  - Nathan Torkington: Open Source Trends
  - Anthony Baxter : "Scripting Language" My Arse: Using Python for Voice over IP
  - Luke Welling: MySQL 2005
  - Damian Conway: Sufficiently Advanced Technology (closing keynote)

=== Papers ===
- Papers from OSDC Australia 2007
- Papers from OSDC Australia 2006
- Papers from OSDC Australia 2005 and 2006
- Papers from OSDC Australia 2004

=== Best presentation ===
Year	Presenter	Paper title
2006	Scott Rippon	Usability, user-centered design (UCD) and FOSS

== OSDC Israel ==
=== Locations ===
Conference site	Dates	City	Venue
OSDC2006 Israel	26–28 February 2006	Netanya, Israel	Netanya Academic College

== OSDC.tw (Taiwan) ==
=== Locations ===
Conference site	Dates	City	Venue
OSDC.tw 2014	11–12 April 2014	Taipei, Taiwan	Building for Humanities and Social Sciences, Academia Sinica, Nangang District
OSDC.tw 2013	19–20 April 2013	Taipei, Taiwan	Building for Humanities and Social Sciences, Academia Sinica, Nangang District
OSDC.tw 2012	14–15 April 2012	Taipei, Taiwan	Building for Humanities and Social Sciences, Academia Sinica, Nangang District
OSDC.tw 2011	26–27 March 2011	Taipei, Taiwan	Building for Humanities and Social Sciences, Academia Sinica, Nangang District
OSDC.tw 2010	24–25 April 2010	Taipei, Taiwan	Building for Humanities and Social Sciences, Academia Sinica, Nangang District
OSDC.tw 2009	18–19 April 2009	Taipei, Taiwan	Microsoft Taiwan Corporation, Xinyi District
OSDC.tw 2008	12–13 April 2008	Taipei, Taiwan	School Of Continuing Education Chinese Culture University, Zhongzheng District
OSDC.tw 2007	14–15 April 2007	Taipei, Taiwan	School Of Continuing Education Chinese Culture University, Zhongzheng District
OSDC Taiwan 2006	8–9 April 2006	Taipei, Taiwan	School Of Continuing Education Chinese Culture University, Zhongzheng District

== OSDC.my (Malaysia) ==
=== Locations ===
Conference site	Dates	City	Venue
OSDC.my 2014	27 May 2014	Kuala Lumpur, Malaysia	Berjaya Time Square, Kuala Lumpur
OSDC.my 2010	29 Jun – 1 July 2010	Kuala Lumpur, Malaysia	Berjaya Time Square, Kuala Lumpur
OSDC.my 2009	31 May – 3 June 2009	Kuala Lumpur, Malaysia	Berjaya Time Square, Kuala Lumpur

== OSDC.fr, France ==
=== Locations ===
Conference site	Dates	City	Venue
OSDC.fr 2013	4–5 October 2013	Paris, France	Montrouge Beffroi
OSDC.fr 2012	12–13 October 2012	Paris, France	Eurosites George V
OSDC.fr 2011	23–24 September 2011	Paris, France	Eurosites George V
OSDC.fr 2010	9–10 October 2010	Paris, France	Carrefour Numérique, Cité des Sciences et de l'Industrie
OSDC.fr 2009	2–3 October 2009	Paris, France	Carrefour Numérique, Cité des Sciences et de l'Industrie

== OSDC.no, Nordic ==
=== Locations ===
Conference site	Dates	City	Venue
OSDC.no	8–10 May 2015	Oslo, Norway	University of Oslo

== See also ==
- linux.conf.au
- O'Reilly Open Source Convention
- YAPC
