= Russell Coker =

Australian free and open-source software developer

- Education: Swinburne University of Technology
- Occupation: Computer programmer

Russell Coker is an Australian computer programmer based in Melbourne. He has been actively involved in the free and open-source software community and is a long time Debian developer. He has also made contributions to Security-Enhanced Linux (SELinux) in the forms of creating reference policy and integrating SELinux to the wider free software ecosystem. In 2003, Coker was awarded a grant from the James and Charlotte Griffin Foundation for his work on SELinux.

He also created the free and open source file system benchmarking software Bonnie++.

== Early life ==
Coker developed an interest in computer programming at a young age, initially with a Talking Electronics TEC-1 computer kit, which was widely available in Australia in the 1980s. He was interested in Unix in high school but due to the curriculum design of his computer class, he didn't have access to it until university.

He obtained his Computer Science and Software Engineering degree at Swinburne University.

== Outspokenness ==
Coker has given talks and lectures on the topic of Linux security for many free and open-source software conferences including SELinux Symposium, FOSDEM 2003, Debconf and LCA. He is also a vocal member in the mailing list of the Linux Users of Victoria, a Linux User Group ("LUG") based in Victoria, Australia.

== Work on SELinux ==
=== SELinux Play Machine ===
Russell Coker used to host a SELinux-enabled server with open root access, allowing anyone on the internet to login as 'root' (administrator account) to demonstrate SELinux can create a secure system without using the Unix permissions model. The server was powered by a Compaq P3-800 system running Debian/Etch in a Xen DomU and provided SSH access via a Tor hidden service. As of 2023, the play machine is no longer accessible.

=== Debian integration ===
As a Debian Developer, Coker helped create and maintain Debian packages for many SELinux libraries and tools for better Debian integration. He also contributed to Debian's SELinux wiki pages.

=== SELinux on iPaQ and User-mode Linux ===
In an effort to enhance the security of embedded systems, Russell Coker first ported SELinux to User-mode Linux to aid development and then modified SELinux to integrate it with iPaQs running Familiar Linux. In his 2003 paper "Porting NSA SE Linux to Hand Held devices", he concludes that "Security Enhanced Linux on a hand-held device can consume less than 1.3M of RAM and less than 400K of disk space (or less than 200K if you really squeeze things)" and believes "the benefits of reducing repair and maintenance problems with hand-held devices that are deployed in the field through better security outweigh the disadvantage of increased memory use for many applications".

=== Conference Papers ===
- SAGE 2006 "Poly-Instantiated Directories in both SE Linux and non-SE Linux environments"
- Linux World 2006 SE Linux tutorials
- AusCERT 2006 SE Linux tutorials
- AUUG 2005 "MCS and MLS in SE Linux"
- OLS 2003 "porting SE Linux to hand-held devices"
- Linux Kongress 2002 "Partitioning a Server with NSA SE Linux"
- OLS 2002 "SE Debian: how to make NSA SE Linux work in a distribution"
