= Kimberlee Weatherall =

Australian lawyer and academic (born 1974)

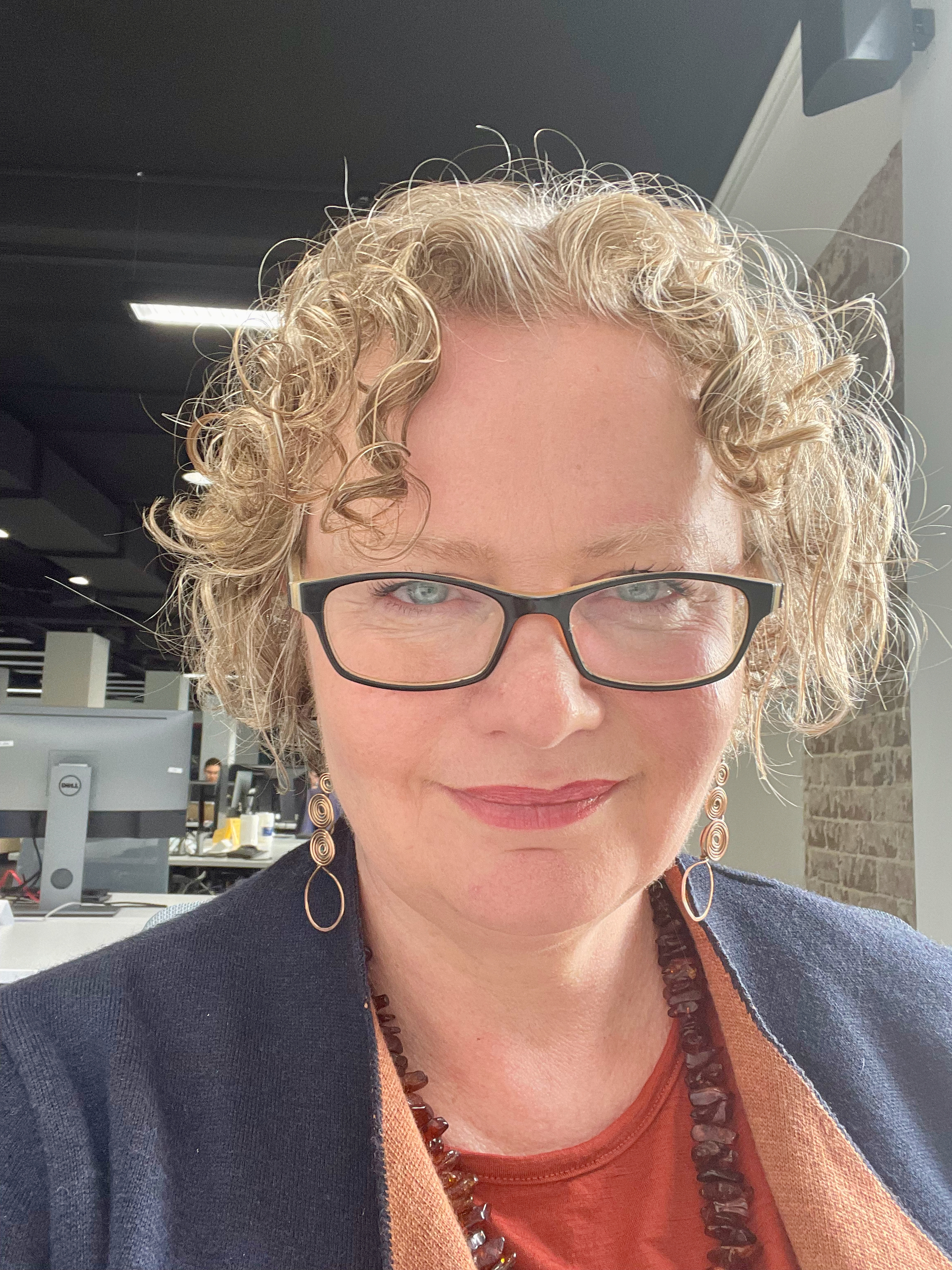
- Kimberlee Weatherall (2021)
- Born: 1974 (age 51–52)
- Occupation: Academic
- Title: Professor

Academic background
- Education: University of Sydney (LLB); Magdalen College, Oxford (LLB); Yale University (LLM)

Academic work
- Discipline: Law
- Sub-discipline: Intellectual property

Kimberlee "Kim" Weatherall (born 1974) is an Australian intellectual property lawyer and professor of law at the University of Sydney Law School specialising in issues at the intersection of law and technology, as well as intellectual property law.

== Career ==
Weatherall studied law at the University of Sydney, then read for the Bachelor of Civil Law at the University of Oxford and a Masters of Laws at Yale University, then worked for Mallesons Stephen Jaques law firm in Sydney before moving into academia. From 2003 to 2006 she was lecturer in law at the University of Melbourne, from 2007 to 2011 she was senior lecturer in Law at The University of Queensland and from 2012 joined The University of Sydney as associate professor and from 2017 became professor of law at the Sydney Law School. She is currently chief investigator in the ARC Centre of Excellence for Automated Decision-Making and Society.

Weatherall is associate director of the Intellectual Property Research Institute of Australia and board member of the Australian Digital Alliance. She is also a Fellow at the Gradient Institute, and a research affiliate of the Humanising Machine Intelligence group at the Australian National University.

She was awarded the third annual Rusty Wrench award for service to the free software community at linux.conf.au 2007. Weatherall was appointed to Australia's Advisory Council on Intellectual Property (ACIP) in 2013.

Her blog Weatherall's Law, was called "one of the most interesting" law blogs by Australasian Business Intelligence in 2006. On 10 January 2007 Weatherall announced she would cease posting to the blog. She continues to blog on intellectual property law issues at LawFont.

== Research ==
Weatherall's current research focuses on the law relating to the collection, ownership, use and governance of data about and related to people, including privacy law, with the goal of ensuring that data collection, use and linkage, and data and predictive analytics are developed in ways that are beneficial to people and society.

== Publications ==
Weatherall has been published in the Sydney Law Review, Federal Law Review, American University International Law Review, Melbourne University Law Review, the Journal of Economic Surveys, and other journals.

She is currently co-editor of the Sydney law school academic journal the Sydney Law Review.
