= Mary Gardiner =

Australian computer scientist and activist

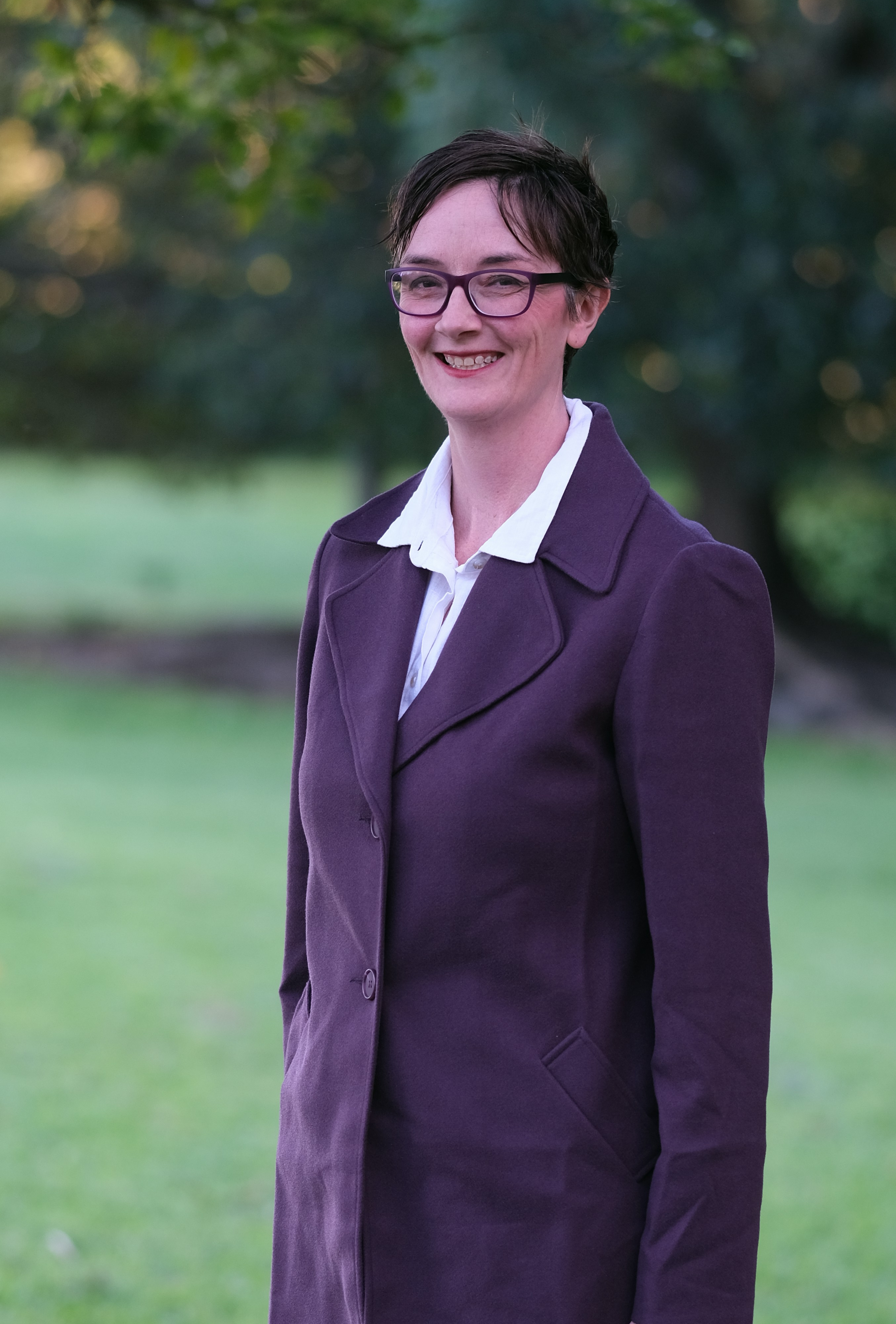
- Citizenship: Australian
- Known for: Linux programming

Mary Gardiner is an Australian Linux programmer who was director of operations at the Ada Initiative, described as a "non-profit organization dedicated to increasing participation of women in open technology and culture". She was a council member of Linux Australia until September 2011. In 2012, Gardiner and Ada Initiative co-founder Valerie Aurora were named two of the most influential people in computer security by SC Magazine.

== Career ==
Gardiner was a co-founder of AussieChix, which later became Oceania Women of Open Tech. She is a former coordinator of LinuxChix. She speaks out against "the social norms and beliefs of a minority of contributors who are not interested in women as colleagues or who do not believe women have the capability to successfully contribute". Gardiner has been involved with drafting and adopting anti-harassment policies for technology conferences. Gardiner was the winner of the 2011 Rusty Wrench award given by Linux Australia for service to Linux programmers in Australia. She was commended for her work to improve gender diversity and oppose sexual harassment in the open-source software community. She was the keynote speaker at Wikimania 2012, which was held 12–15 July 2012 in Washington, D.C. In 2012, Gardiner was listed as one of the 10 Women in Tech Who Give Back by Datamation and one of the most influential people in computer security by SC Magazine.

== See also ==
- AdaCamp
