= JBD =

JBD may refer to:

- Journaling block device, a Linux kernel function
- Jernbanedirektoratet, the Norwegian Railway Directorate
- Jet blast deflector, a safety device that redirects jet engine exhaust
