= Jeff Waugh =

Australian software engineer

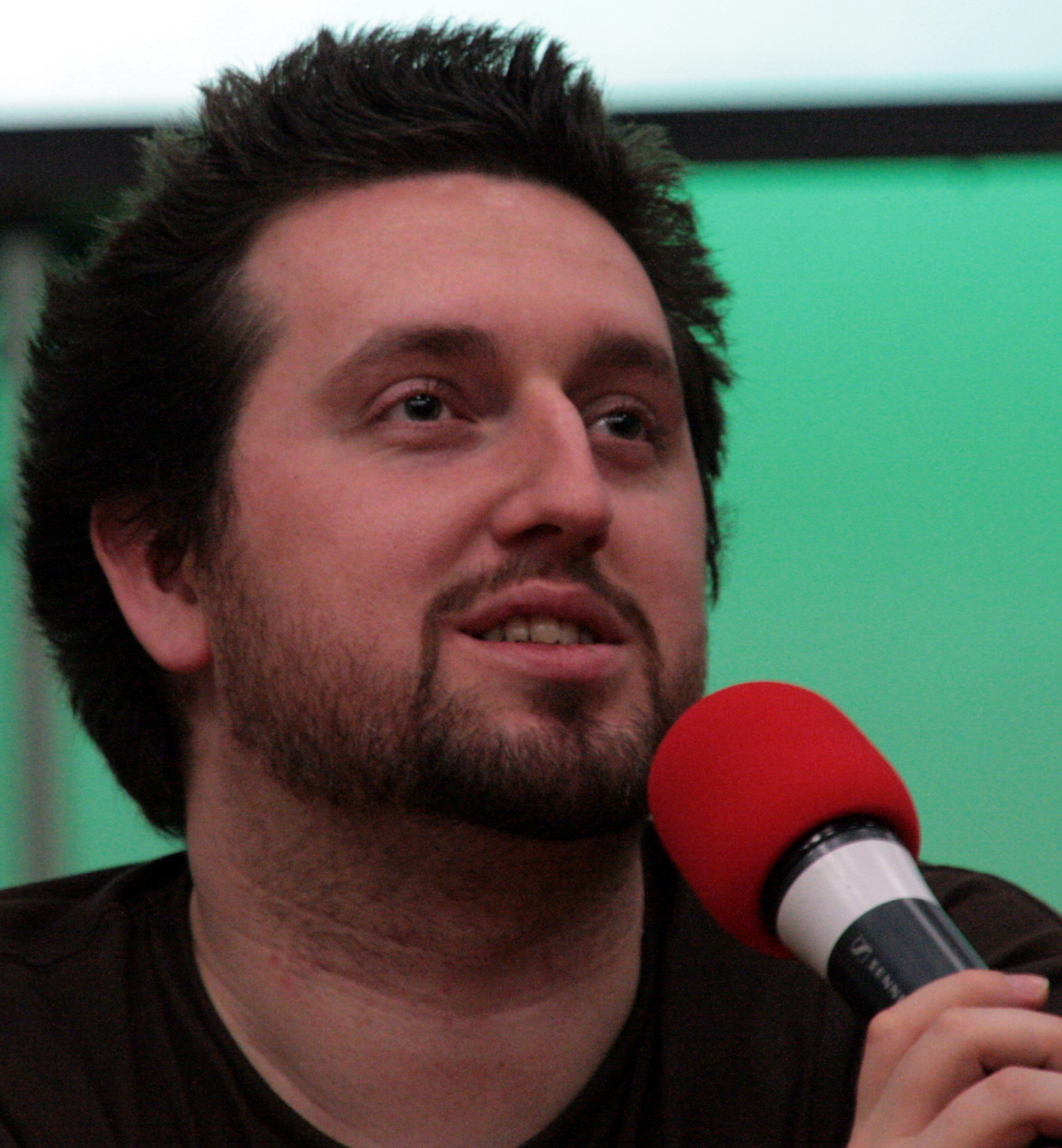
- Jeff Waugh speaking at GUADEC in 2007
- Other name: jdub
- Known for: Prominence in Free Software community, especially GNOME and Ubuntu
- Website: bethesignal.org

Jeff Waugh (also known as "jdub") is an Australian free software and open source software engineer. He is known for his past prominence in the GNOME and Ubuntu projects and communities.

== Career ==
In 2004, Waugh was hired by Mark Shuttleworth as an early employee of Canonical Ltd. and member of the Ubuntu project, where he worked in business development. At OSCON in 2005, Waugh won "Best Evangelist" in the Google-O'Reilly Open Source Awards for his evangelism of Ubuntu and GNOME. He announced his resignation from Canonical in July 2006 to focus more fully on his work in the GNOME project.

From 2007 Waugh and then-wife Pia Waugh were co-directors of Waugh Partners, an Australian Open Source consultancy launched in 2006. Waugh Partners won the 2007 NSW State Pearcey Award for Young Achievers for their work promoting Free Software to the Australian ICT industry. In 2008 Waugh was a partner of the One Laptop Per Child Australia program. In 2008 Pia Waugh moved to a new career; Waugh's later employers have included Bulletproof Networks and Kounta.

== Positions ==
Waugh has served in a number of formal and semi-formal positions in Free Software development and community projects:

- Director, Open Source Industry Australia, 2008
- Director, the GNOME Foundation board, 2003–2004 and 2006–2008
- Member of the linux.conf.au 2007 organising team
- Chairman of the Annodex Foundation 2005–2006
- GNOME release manager 2001–2005
- President of the Sydney Linux Users Group, 2002–2003
- Member of the committee of the Sydney Linux Users Group, 2000–2002.
- Member of the linux.conf.au 2001 organising team

== Other development projects ==
Waugh is an author of the Python feed aggregator Planet.

== Personal life ==
Waugh was married to fellow open-source advocate and community leader Pia Waugh until 2011. He wrote on his blog in September 2011, on the occasion of RUOK? Day, that he had been struggling with depression since his late teens, and that it had been a contributing factor to the divorce, but that he felt he had overcome it.
