= OSIA =

OSIA may refer to:

- Open Source Industry Australia
- Order Sons of Italy in America
- On-Site Inspection Agency
- Open Standard Identity APIs
