= Linux Symposium =

Canadian tech conference

The Linux Symposium was a Linux and open source conference held annually in Canada from 1999 to 2014. The conference was initially named Ottawa Linux Symposium and was held only in Ottawa, but was renamed after being held in other cities in Canada. Even after the name change, however, it was still referred to as OLS. The conference featured 100+ paper presentations, tutorials, birds of a feather sessions and mini summits on a wide range of topics. There were 650 attendees from 20+ countries in 2008.

== History ==
The 2009 Symposium was held in Montréal, Quebec.

The 2011 and 2012 Symposium were both held in Ottawa.

In 2014, OLS organizers put together an unsuccessful campaign on Indiegogo to raise funds in order to pay off debts from previous events.

== Keynote speakers ==
- 1999 - Alan Cox
- 2000 - David S. Miller, Miguel de Icaza
- 2001 - Ted Ts'o
- 2002 - Stephen Tweedie
- 2003 - Rusty Russell
- 2004 - Andrew Morton
- 2005 - David Jones
- 2006 - Greg Kroah-Hartman
- 2007 - James Bottomley
- 2008 - Matthew Wilcox, Werner Almesberger, Mark Shuttleworth
- 2009 - Keith Bergelt, Jonathan Corbet, Dirk Hohndel
- 2010 - Jon C. Masters, Tim Riker
- 2011 - Jon "maddog" Hall
- 2014 - Jeff Garzik

== Mini-summits ==
The Symposium hosted "mini-summits" on the day before the conference. They were open to all conference attendees and had their own programme. Five mini-summits were hosted in 2008, including: Virtualization, Security-Enhanced Linux, Kernel Container Developers', Linux Power Management and Linux Wireless LAN. There were two mini-summits in 2009: Linux Power Management and Tracing.

== See also ==
- Linux Kernel Developers Summit
- List of free-software events
