= Linux Australia =

Australian community interested in Unix-like operating systems

Linux Australia is the national, Australian Free and Open Source Software Community organisation. It was founded in 1997 and formally incorporated in New South Wales as a non-profit organisation in 1999. Linux Australia aims to represent Australian Free and Open Source Software communities and to support and collaborate with related groups, including Linux User Groups in Australia.

Jonathan Oxer, Past President

== History and goals ==
Linux Australia was co-founded by Terry Dawson and Gary Allpike. The organisation was formally incorporated to provide legal support for the inaugural Conference of Australian Linux Users (now linux.conf.au). Over progressive years the organisation has steadily matured in its operation and today its major activities include the annual linux.conf.au open source conference, a grants program that seeds and supports relevant open source projects, and regular participation in public events such as conferences and exhibitions. Public relations activities include lobbying to government and corporate entities on open source issues and comment and opinion to the media.

== Office holders ==
The executive council is elected democratically by the organisation membership annually, and therefore changes year to year. Membership is open to anyone with an interest in furthering the goals and objectives of the organisation.

=== Presidents ===
- Terry Dawson 2001
- Anand Kumria 2002
- Pia Smith 2003, 2004
- Jonathan Oxer 2005-2007
- Stewart Smith (Australian) 2008, 2009
- John Ferlito 2010-2012
- Joshua Hesketh 2013-2015
- Hugh Blemings 2016
- Kathy Reid 2017-2019
- Sae Ra Germaine 2019-2021
- Joel Addison 2022-

Previous committee members and details can be found on the Linux Australia website http://linux.org.au/About/Council

Notable former committee members include Andrew "Tridge" Tridgell (Samba), and Paul "Rusty" Russell (Linux Kernel, notably Netfilter and the 2.6 modules rewrite), and Mary Gardiner founder of the Ada Initiative.

== The Rusty Wrench award ==
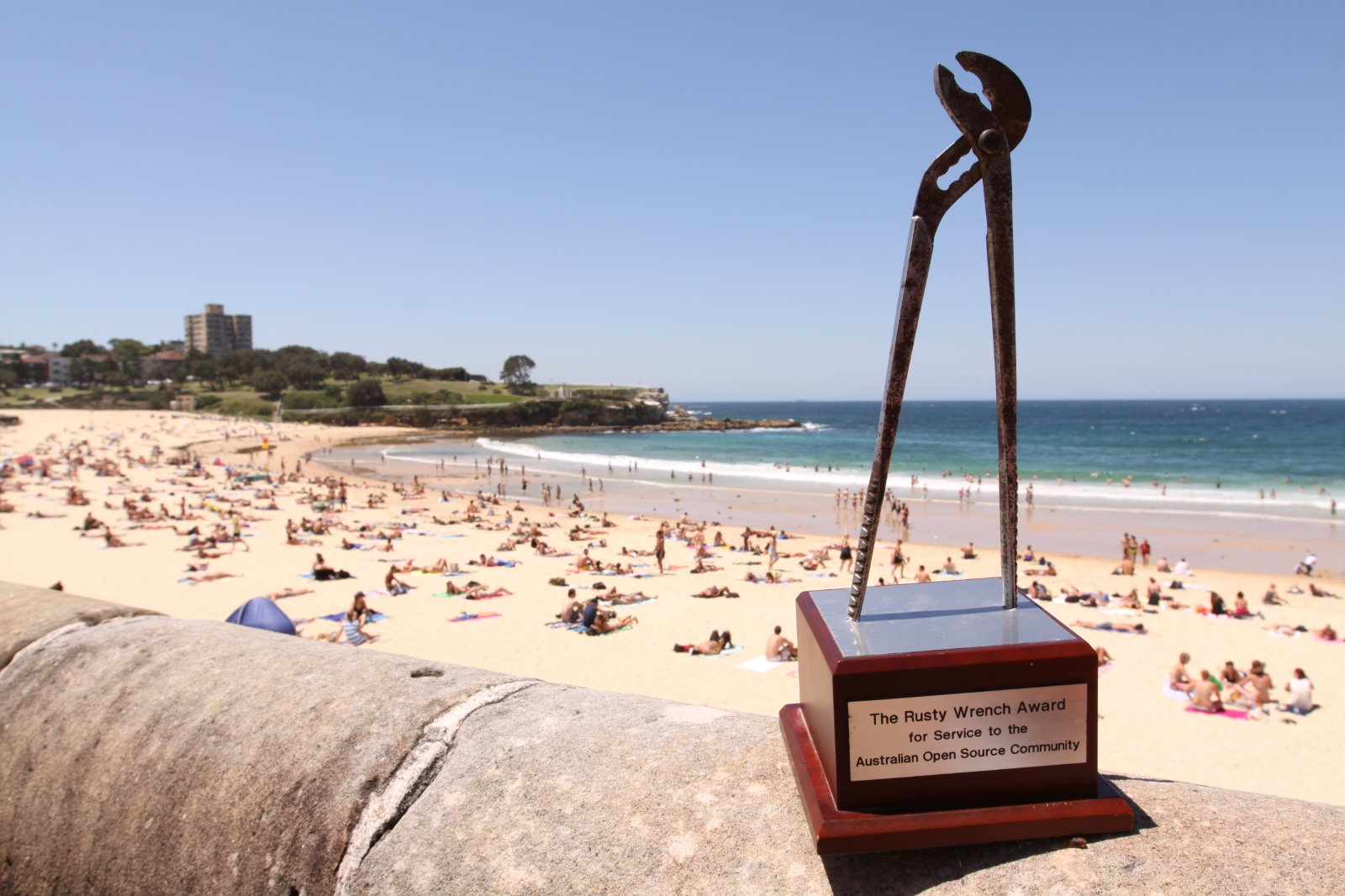
The Rusty Wrench at Coogee Beach, Feb 2013

The Rusty Wrench is an award presented annually at linux.conf.au since 2005 for service to the free software community in Australia. It is named for its first recipient, Rusty Russell.

=== Past recipients ===
- 2022 Dave Lane
- 2021 Ryan Verner
- 2020 Jonathan Oxer
- 2019 Joshua Hesketh
- 2017 Michael Davies and Michael Still (joint winners)
- 2015 Steve Walsh
- 2014 Andrew Tridgell
- 2013 Donna Benjamin
- 2012 Mary Gardiner
- 2007 Kimberlee Weatherall
- 2006 Pia Waugh
- 2005 Rusty Russell

The Rusty Wrench award was not awarded between 2008 and 2011. It was awarded again at linux.conf.au 2012 based on nominations from the free software and open source communities.

== See also ==
- AUUG, the Australian Unix systems User Group
- Open Source Industry Australia
