= ARC Centre of Excellence for Automated Decision-Making and Society =

Australian research centre

The ARC Centre of Excellence for Automated Decision-Making and Society (ADM+S) is a multi-institutional, multi-disciplinary research centre based at RMIT University in Melbourne, Australia.

== Description ==
The ARC Centre of Excellence for Automated Decision-Making and Society Centre aims to contribute to the knowledge and strategies necessary for responsible, ethical and inclusive automated decision-making (ADM). It was established at RMIT in 2020 with funding from the Australian Government through the Australian Research Council (ARC) and other partners. The Centre examines the social and technical aspects of ADM, seeing automated systems as the outcomes of interactions between people, machines, data and institutions. It has a particular focus on the domains of news and media, transport and mobility, social services and health.

== Projects and initiatives ==
Research projects at the ADM+S Centre range across automated systems, from autonomous and semi-autonomous vehicles to the recommendation systems deployed in digital media. Researchers work on technologies from machine learning to blockchain. Projects are concerned with a wide spectrum of problems from digital inclusion to disinformation, addressing developments primarily in Australia and the Global South. Centre projects include:

=== Australian Search Experience project ===
This research project is investigating if and how search results on Google differ for different people using a crowd-sourcing process recruited from Australian internet users. It follows on from a similar project run by Algorithm Watch in Germany in 2017. As of August 2020, the results indicated that search personalisation is limited; however for some topics, such as COVID-19, there might be a high level of curation.

=== Considerate and Accurate Multi-party Recommender Systems for Constrained Resources ===
This project aims to develop a next generation recommender system that enables equitable allocation of constrained resources. The project will produce novel hybrid socio-technical methods and resources to create a Considerate and Accurate REcommender System (CARES), evaluated with social science and behavioural economics lenses. CARES aims to transform the sharing economy by delivering systems and methods that improve user and non-user experiences, business efficiency, and corporate social responsibility.

=== Automated decision-making and the law ===
Centre researchers Dan Hunter and Kimberlee Weatherall are investigating the role of artificial intelligence, natural language processing and other technologies which are having a major impact on decision-making and administration across the legal system.

== Funding and partners ==
Total combined funding for the centre is A$71.1 million with the ARC providing funding of A$31.8 million over 7 years from 2020 until 2026. Centre partners include eight Australian universities and 22 organisations from around Australia, Europe, Asia and America. The Centre headquarters are located at RMIT University; the other Australian university partners are Monash University, Queensland University of Technology, Swinburne University of Technology, University of Melbourne, University of New South Wales, Western Sydney University, University of Sydney and University of Queensland.

== Members ==
As of 2025, Chief Investigators of the ADM+S Centre include:

=== Centre leadership ===
- Distinguished Prof Julian Thomas, Centre Director, RMIT University
- Prof Jean Burgess, Centre Associate Director, QUT

=== Chief Investigators ===
- Prof Kath Albury, Swinburne University
- Prof Mark Andrejevic, Monash University
- Prof Daniel Angus, QUT
- Prof Axel Bruns, QUT
- Prof Nicholas Carah, University of Queensland
- Dr Jake Goldenfein, University of Melbourne
- Prof Heather Horst, Western Sydney University
- Prof Christopher Leckie, University of Melbourne
- Prof Deborah Lupton, UNSW
- Prof Anthony McCosker, Swinburne University
- Assoc Prof James Meese, RMIT University
- Prof Christine Parker, University of Melbourne
- Prof Sarah Pink, Monash University
- Assoc Prof Michael Richardson, UNSW Sydney
- Prof Flora Salim, UNSW
- Prof Mark Sanderson, RMIT University
- Prof Jackie Leach Scully, UNSW
- Prof Nicolas Suzor, QUT
- Prof Kimberlee Weatherall, University of Sydney
- Prof Haiqing Yu, RMIT University

Among the Associate Investigators is Dr Jathan Sadowski of Monash University
