= Linux Users of Victoria =

Linux User Group based in Victoria, Australia

Linux Users of Victoria ("LUV") is a Linux User Group ("LUG") based in the state of Victoria, Australia. It was incorporated in 1993 as a not for profit group, making it one of the largest and oldest Linux User Groups in Australia. It now has close to fifteen hundred members. It used to have regional SIGs but they are currently inactive. Meetings are held on the first Tuesday of the month via Jitsi or BBB.

== Organization ==
The committee is democratically elected each year in advance of the Annual General Meeting using free election software called MemberDB. The positions are President, Vice-President, Secretary and Treasurer, as well as four ordinary committee members - the current committee members are listed on the website.

== Events ==
On November 29, 2003, according to Sydney Morning Herald, LUV is one of the two Linux user groups based in Melbourne, and they held an installfest—a group meeting where new users are given assistance how to install Linux on their PC.

In 2008, the then-president of LUV, Andrew Chalmers, co-signed a letter to Julia Gillard, MP Deputy Prime Minister of Australia and Minister for Education, requesting that the government advocates the use of free and open source software in schools, so that the $1000 of government funding aimed at buying a computer for each secondary school student will be spent more effectively. In 2008, LUV also participated in the software freedom day and held local events; one of the local event organizers, Donna Benjamin, commented the event is a "Think Global, Act Local" celebration.

In April 2021, Russell Coker, a participant at LUV's mailing list, commented that the Bureau of Meteorology blocking text based web browsers, such as lynx and w3m, unnecessarily made it difficult for about half the people using braille readers to access the site. These text browsers would allow them to use text to speech engines to retrieve the site content, such as climate information and weather forecasts.

LUV have been called "Australia's best known and most active open source community".
