= Ubuntu Hacks =

- Author: Jonathan Oxer; Kyle Rankin; Bill Childers
- Language: English
- Series: Hacks
- Publisher: O'Reilly Media
- Publication date: June 2006
- Publication place: United States
- Pages: 447
- ISBN: 0-596-52720-9

Ubuntu Hacks: Tips & Tools for Exploring, Using, and Tuning Linux is a book of tips about Ubuntu, a popular Linux distribution. The book was published by O'Reilly Media in June 2006 as part of the O'Reilly Hacks series.

== Editions ==
- First edition (2006; 447 pages; ISBN 0-596-52720-9)
