= David S. Miller =

American software programmer

David Stephen Miller
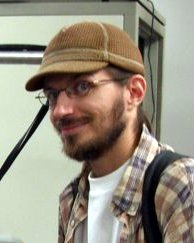
- Born: November 26, 1974 (age 51); New Brunswick, New Jersey, USA
- Other name: DaveM
- Occupation: Programmer
- Employer: Red Hat
- Known for: Linux Kernel, GCC

David Stephen Miller (born November 26, 1974) is an American software developer working on the Linux kernel, where he is the primary maintainer of the networking subsystem and individual networking drivers, the SPARC implementation, and the IDE subsystem. With other people, he co-maintains the crypto API, KProbes, IPsec, and is also involved in other development work.

He is also a founding member of the GNU Compiler Collection (GCC) steering committee.

== Work ==
As of January 2022, Miller is #1 in "non-author signoff" patches, which are Linux kernel modifications reviewed by the subsystem maintainer who ultimately applies them. He's been in the top gatekeepers for years since kernel 2.6.22 in 2007.

He worked at the Rutgers University Center for Advanced Information Processing, at Cobalt Microserver, and then Red Hat since 1999.

=== SPARC porting ===
Miller ported the Linux kernel to the Sun Microsystems SPARC in 1996 with Miguel de Icaza. He has also ported Linux to the 64-bit UltraSPARC machines, including UltraSPARC T1 in early 2006 and later the T2 and T2+. As of 2010 he continues to maintain the SPARC port (both 32-bit and 64-bit).

In April 2008, Miller contributed the SPARC port of gold, a from-scratch rewrite of the GNU linker.

=== Linux networking ===
Miller is one of the maintainers of the Linux TCP/IP stack and has been key in improving its performance in high load environments. He also wrote and/or contributed to numerous network card drivers in the Linux kernel.

=== eBPF ===
As of 2019, Miller was working on Linux's dynamic tracing technology, called eBPF.

== Speeches ==
David delivered the keynote address at netdev 0.1 on February 16, 2015, in Ottawa. He previously delivered keynotes at the Ottawa Linux Symposium in 2000, and at Linux.conf.au in Dunedin in January 2006.

He gave a talk on "Multiqueue Networking Developments in the Linux Kernel" at the July 2009 meeting of the New York Linux Users Group.
