= Stephen Tweedie =

Scottish computer programmer

Stephen C. Tweedie
- Born: Edinburgh, Scotland

Stephen C. Tweedie is a Scottish software developer who is known for his work on the Linux kernel, in particular his work on filesystems.

After becoming involved with the development of the ext2 filesystem working on performance issues, he led the development of the ext3 filesystem which involved adding a journaling layer (JBD) to the ext2 filesystem. For his work on the journaling layer, he has been described by fellow Linux developer Andrew Morton as "a true artisan".

Born in Edinburgh, Scotland in 1969, Tweedie studied computer science at Churchill College, Cambridge and the University of Edinburgh, where he did his thesis on Contention and Achieved Performance in Multicomputer Wormhole Routing Networks. After contributing to the Linux kernel in his spare time since the early nineties and working on VMS filesystem support for DEC for two years, Tweedie was employed by Linux distributor Red Hat where he continues to work on the Linux kernel.

Tweedie has published a number of papers on Linux, including Design and Implementation of the Second Extended Filesystem in 1994, Journaling the Linux ext2fs Filesystem in 1998, and Planned Extensions to the Linux Ext2/Ext3 Filesystem in 2002.

Tweedie is also a frequent speaker on the subject of Linux kernel development at technical conferences. Amongst others, he has given talks on Linux kernel development at the 1997 and 1998 USENIX Annual Technical Conferences, the 2000 UKUUG conference in London, and he gave the keynote speech at the Ottawa Linux Symposium in 2002.
