= The Dawn (feminist magazine) =

Dawn
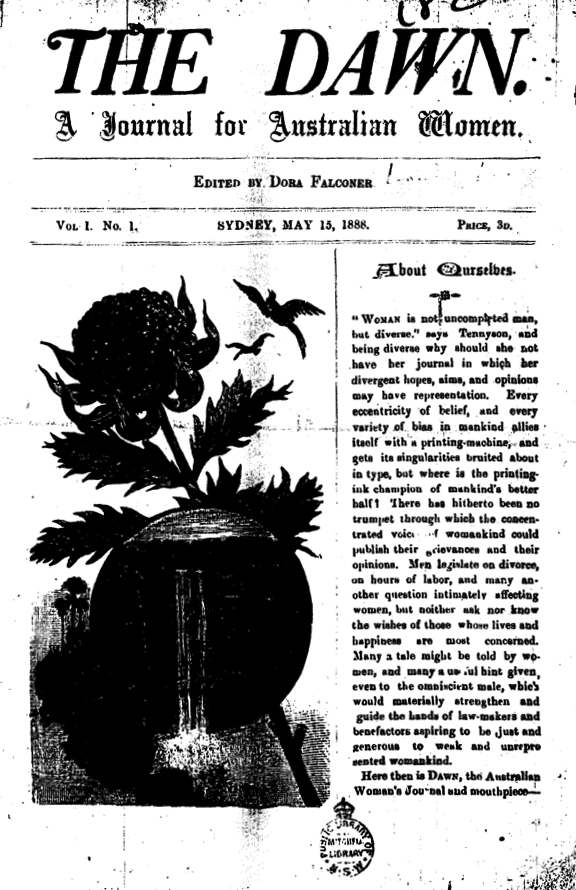
- Front cover of the first edition, 15 May 1888
- Editor: Louisa Lawson
- Frequency: Monthly
- Founded: 1888
- Final issue: 1905
- Country: Australia
- Based in: Sydney
- Language: English
- ISSN: 1839-7468
- OCLC: 779978701

The Dawn: A Journal for Australian Women was an early feminist journal published monthly in Sydney, Australia, from 1888 to 1905. It was first published on 15 May 1888 by Louisa Lawson under the pen name Dora Falconer. The subtitle was later changed to A Journal for the Household.

== History ==
Louisa Lawson left her husband in 1883 and relocated her family to Sydney. There, she supported her children through various jobs, including working as a seamstress and running a boarding house. During this period, she was introduced to women's suffrage. In 1887, she purchased the Republican, a journal dedicated to Australian independence, and in 1888, she founded the Dawn.

From the outset, the Dawn was intended as a mouthpiece for women. In the first edition, Louisa Lawson, writing as Dora Falconer, stated:

Every eccentricity of belief, and every variety of bias in mankind allies itself with a printing machine, and gets its singularities bruited about in type, but where is the printing-ink champion of mankind's better half? There has hitherto been no trumpet through which the concentrated voice of womankind could publish their grievances and their opinions ... Here then is Dawn, the Australian Woman's Journal and mouthpiece.

— Dora Falconer, 15 May 1888

Nevertheless, the Dawn soon met with opposition. It was produced by an all-women team of editors and printers, a fact that angered trade unionists in the New South Wales Typographical Association, partly because women were paid substantially less than men. In opposing the Dawn, the association argued that the pay discrepancies were such that men would be unable to compete, as women would be "... able to work for half the wages a man would require to keep himself and family in comfort and respectability," and that the work was too dangerous for women. The association attempted to boycott the publication, and at one stage, a member visited their offices to "harangue the staff," only to be removed after Lawson threw a bucket of water on them. Lawson won the battle through patience and "stern resistance." Eventually, the boycott lost momentum, and the Dawn continued as before.

Masthead used from late 1900 until the final issue in July 1905.

Despite the early disputes, the Dawn proved successful. Lawson's ability to attract significant advertising was key to its success, (Pearce noted that up to half of the magazine was devoted to advertising), as were her efforts to promote the work. Lawson encouraged children to register subscribers by offering prizes and ran regular competitions within the magazine to increase circulation and retain subscribers. Her efforts granted the Dawn a much longer life than other contemporary Australian feminist magazines.

The final issue of the Dawn was published in July 1905. Believing there was no one suitable to carry on her work, Louisa Lawson "ended her paper as she started it, quite upon her own responsibility." Her poor health, resulting from a Tram Accident, and a legal dispute regarding her mail bag fastener invention were key factors in her decision.

== Content and themes ==
Lawson's working-class background was reflected in the Dawn; it aimed at a wider audience than the middle class. The price was low enough to appeal to those from the working classes, and the content similarly reflected this aim. As identified by Aitken, the Dawn included household hints that were "aimed at women running a home without servants." Along with those hints came editorials, articles, columns, correspondence, poetry, short stories, material for children, and fashion. The Dawn was deliberately aimed at the whole household, and the political messages were interwoven with the other content.

To some extent, the Dawn existed in opposition to The Bulletin, another magazine of the period that was aimed squarely at men. Each publication produced radically different views of the roles of men and women in society. While The Bulletin of the day has been described as depicting women as either "vain, conniving, … spendthrift [and] bent on entrapment" or as "bitter harridan[s]", the Dawn took a very different approach, depicting men in relation to home values and arguing that emancipation of women was necessary for the advancement of society.

The Dawn tackled a number of issues of interest to women, including the use of corsets, female suffrage, the overworking of women, and a woman's role within marriage. In addition, Lawson, through the pages of the Dawn, was unusual in being the only leader of the Australian women's movement who repeatedly raised the issue of spousal abuse. Within the Dawn, she "offered a far-reaching critique of power relations within marriage" that was careful not to depict women as simple passive victims, but instead encouraged women to fight and escape their situation. Sheridan noted that this range of issues granted the Dawn much of its strength; Lawson did not shy away from domestic or public issues, covering both through the pages of the magazine. Cousins has further argued that the Dawn constructed a certain view of femininity to mount the case for female suffrage, and also one of masculinity. The Dawn presented a distinct and often unflattering view of `manhood' to their readers in an attempt to gain positions of power for women not just in the public sphere, but also within the domestic realm. In doing so, the writers were advocating a significant shift in the power relations that operated between men and women.

== Influence ==
The Dawn was widely read both within Australia and internationally, leading Scott to describe Lawson as the "earliest Australian woman to be influential" within the British suffrage movement. Domestically, the success of the Dawn led to the founding of the "Dawn Club" in 1889, and the Dawn "helped to pave the way for women's magazines in Australia", validating the experiences of women, their work, and their writing.

The magazine is also considered an important precursor to the women in print movement, when second-wave feminists established alternative communication networks by creating publications that were written, edited, printed, distributed, and read by women.

== Availability ==
The magazine is available on microfiche in many large Australian libraries. A campaign to increase its availability by raising sufficient funds to digitize the Dawn via the National Library of Australia was launched in 2011 by Donna Benjamin. The campaign succeeded, raising sufficient funds prior to the end of International Women's Day 2011 to enable the digital version to become available on International Women's Day 2012.

== Bibliography ==
- Patricia Clarke Pen Portraits (1988) Allen & Unwin ISBN 9780043370070
- Olive Lawson The First Voice of Australian Feminism (1990) Simon & Schuster ISBN 0731801377

== See also ==
List of newspapers in New South Wales
