= GovHack =

Australia's largest open data hackathon

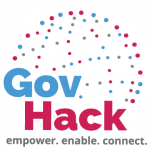
- Status: Active
- Genre: Hackathon
- Frequency: Annually
- Locations: Australia, New Zealand, and International Virtual event
- Years active: 17
- Inaugurated: 2009
- Attendance: >15,000 total
- Website: http://www.govhack.org

GovHack is a significant annual open government and open data hackathon, attracting over 15,000 participants since 2009. First run as a small Canberra-based event, it quickly expanded to an international competition with simultaneous events taking place in major cities across Australia and New Zealand each year, with virtual events for remote and international participants. Since its inception, over 2,500 projects have been published by participants to demonstrate the practical value of open data.

== Format ==
The competition requires small teams of competitors to produce a project using open data within 46 hours, from Friday evening to Sunday afternoon. The format of the project is unspecified, but web applications, mobile apps, and visualisations are common, with games and art also being encouraged.

Although competitors may use any available open data, certain prize categories mandate the use of certain datasets, such as "Best Geoscience Award" or "Best Use of Taxation Statistics Award". Typically, participating sponsors and government departments release new datasets for the competition each year.

Each team must produce evidence of work, such as source code, and are judged on a three-minute video they must produce about their project. Teams are required to publish their projects using an open license.

== History ==
GovHack was first run at the Australian National University in 2009, funded by the Australian "Gov 2.0 Taskforce".

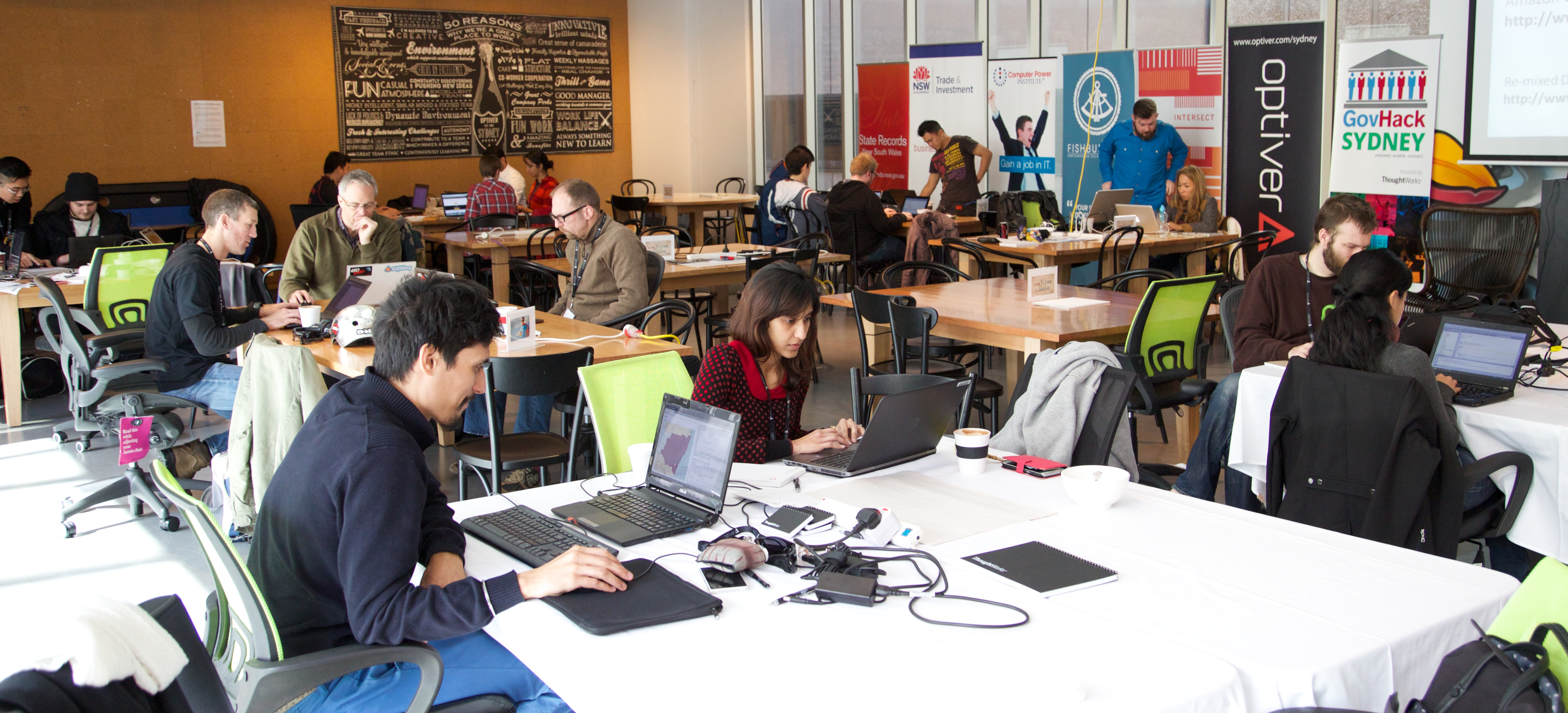
Participants at GovHack 2014 in Sydney.

In 2012, GovHack became an annual event and was run in two locations. During the early years of the competition, the Australian chapter of the Open Knowledge Foundation assisted with the operation of the event, with Pia Andrews as head of the national GovHack operations team.

From 2013 to 2017 GovHack rapidly expanded to become an international competition run throughout Australia and New Zealand, with virtual events for remote and international participants.

2014 marked the first annual GovHack Red Carpet Awards to celebrate the winners, sponsors, and volunteers of GovHack, taking place at Brisbane City Hall.

During the COVID-19 pandemic, GovHack was run entirely virtually. As a result, participation dropped significantly from 1500 participants in 2019, to less than half of that for the following years.

== Events ==
Year	Date	Participants	Projects	Prize money	Events	Red Carpet Awards	Notes
2024	6–8 September	590	187	[?]	27	[data missing]	
2023	18–20 August	672	191	A$70,000	26	19 November - University of the Sunshine Coast, Brisbane, Australia	
2022	19–21 August	521	147	A$61,000	27	29 October - Infosys Living Labs, Melbourne, Australia	
2021	20–22 August	523	155	A$83,000	24	21 October - Digital livestream due to COVID-19 pandemic	
2020	14–16 August	691	158	[?]	18	14-26 October - Via social media due to COVID-19 pandemic	
2019	6–8 September	1500	259	[?]	38	9 November - National Museum of Australia, Canberra, Australia	
2018	7–9 September	2000	243	[?]	37	10 November - Australian Technology Park, Sydney, Australia	
2017	28–30 July	2300	379	[?]	36	14 October - Brisbane City Hall, Brisbane, Australia	
2016	29–31 July	3000	480	A$300,000	40	22 October - State Library of South Australia, Adelaide, Australia	
2015	3–5 July	2200	270	A$120,000	31	5 September - Power House Museum, Sydney, Australia	
2014	11–13 July	1300	170	A$70,000	13	10 August - Brisbane City Hall, Brisbane, Australia	
2013	31 May – 2 June	900	108	A$170,000	8	(No Red Carpet Awards this year)	
2012	1–3 June	140	40	A$40,000	2	(No Red Carpet Awards this year)	
2009	30–31 October	150	20	[?]	1	(No Red Carpet Awards this year)	
