= Linux Kernel Developers Summit =

Annual Linux conference

The Linux Kernel Developers Summit (also known as the Linux Kernel Maintainer Summit) is an annual gathering of the top Linux kernel developers. Attendance at the summit is by invitation only, and the conference was first held in San Jose in March 2001. It was organized by Theodore Ts'o to provide a face to face venue for kernel developers to discuss current and future issues surrounding Linux kernel development, and was initially run by Usenix and then VA Linux's Open Source Developer's Network. Subsequent summits from 2002 to 2006 were held the two days prior to the Ottawa Linux Symposium in Ottawa, Ontario, Canada at the same conference center with Usenix providing all of the logistical support. The 2007 Kernel Summit was held on September 4–6, 2007 at the DeVere University Arms Hotel in Cambridge, England, and was the first time the summit was moved outside of North America.

== Content ==
The discussions at the kernel summit have traditionally been highly technical, with a focus on issues that were not getting resolution via electronic mail. In recent years, however, the summit has been gradually focusing more on higher level development process issues. An example of an important development process decision made at the kernel summit was the decision to move to a rolling stable 2.6 kernel every few months, instead of the formerly used model using a 1–2-year development cycle. The Linux Technical Advisory Board is elected at a bird-of-a-feather session at the Linux Kernel Summit.

The summit usually hosts around 80 attendees.

== Summit locations ==
Date	Host country	Location	Website	Summary
March 30–31, 2001	United States	Hyatt Hotel, San Jose, CA		
June 24–25, 2002	Canada	Ottawa Congress Centre, Ottawa, Ontario		
July 21–22, 2003	Canada	Ottawa Congress Centre, Ottawa, Ontario		
July 19–20, 2004	Canada	Ottawa Congress Centre, Ottawa, Ontario		
July 18–19, 2005	Canada	Ottawa Congress Centre, Ottawa, Ontario		
July 16–18, 2006	Canada	Ottawa Congress Centre, Ottawa, Ontario		
September 4–6, 2007	United Kingdom	DeVere University Arms Hotel, Cambridge		
September 15–16, 2008	United States	Portland State University, Portland, OR		
October 18–20, 2009	Japan	Akihabara Convention Hall, Akihabara, Tokyo		
November 1–2, 2010	United States	Hyatt Regency Cambridge, Cambridge, MA		
October 23–25, 2011	Czech Republic	Clarion Congress Hotel, Prague, Czech Republic		
August 27–29, 2012	United States	San Diego, CA	N/A	
October 23–25, 2013	United Kingdom	Edinburgh, United Kingdom		
August 18–20, 2014	United States	Sheraton Chicago, Chicago, IL		
October 26–28, 2015	South Korea	Conrad Hotel, Seoul, South Korea		
October 31–November 1, 2016	United States	Santa Fe Convention Center, Santa Fe, NM		
October 24–26, 2017	Czech Republic	Hilton Prague, Prague Czech Republic		
November 13–15, 2018	Canada	Sheraton Vancouver Wall Centre, Vancouver, Canada		
September 12, 2019	Portugal	Corinthia Hotel Lisbon, Lisbon, Portugal		
September 24, 2021		Virtual		
September 15, 2022	Ireland	Dublin, Ireland		
November 16, 2023	United States	Richmond, Virginia		
September 17, 2024	Austria	Vienna, Austria		
December 18, 2025	Japan	Tokyo		
October 8, 2026	Czech Republic	Prague Congress Centre, Prague, Czech Republic		
