= Bonnie++ =

Free Software File System Benchmarking Tool

- Developer(s): Russell Coker
- Initial release: October 13, 1999; 25 years ago (0.97)
- Stable release: 2.00a / September 22, 2020; 4 years ago
- Written in: C++
- Operating system: Unix-like
- Available in: English
- Type: Benchmarking
- License: GPL v2
- Website: doc.coker.com.au/projects/bonnie/

Bonnie++ is a free software file system benchmarking tool for Unix-like operating systems, developed by Russell Coker. Bonnie++ is a benchmark suite that is aimed at performing a number of simple tests of hard drive and file system performance.

== Features ==
Bonnie++ allows you to benchmark how your file systems perform with respect to data read and write speed, the number of seeks that can be performed per second, and the number of file metadata operations that can be performed per second.

== Sample output ==
# ./bonnie++ -u root
Using uid:0, gid:0.
Writing with putc()...done
Writing intelligently...done
Rewriting...done
Reading with getc()...done
Reading intelligently...done
start 'em...done...done...done...
Create files in sequential order...done.
Stat files in sequential order...done.
Delete files in sequential order...done.
Create files in random order...done.
Stat files in random order...done.
Delete files in random order...done.
Version 1.03d       ------Sequential Output------ --Sequential Input- --Random-
                    -Per Chr- --Block-- -Rewrite- -Per Chr- --Block-- --Seeks—
Machine        Size K/sec %CP K/sec %CP K/sec %CP K/sec %CP K/sec %CP  /sec %CP
localhost      300M  6000  40  5913   9  4213  10 10407  86 20664  20  1078  13
                    ------Sequential Create------ --------Random Create--------
                    -Create-- --Read--- -Delete-- -Create-- --Read--- -Delete—
              files  /sec %CP  /sec %CP  /sec %CP  /sec %CP  /sec %CP  /sec %CP
                 16    10  93 +++++ +++    74  63    17  90 +++++ +++    27  58
 localhost,300M,6000,40,5913,9,4213,10,10407,86,20664,20,1078.1,13,16,10,93,+++++,+++,74,63,17,90,+++++,+++,27,58

The final CSV output includes the information related to data read and write speed, number of seeks that can be performed per second, and number of file metadata operations that can be performed per second and the CPU usage statistics for the below given tests:

1. Create files in sequential order
2. Stat files in sequential order
3. Delete files in sequential order
4. Create files in random order
5. Stat files in random order
6. Delete files in random order

== History ==
This benchmark is named Bonnie++ because it is based on the Bonnie benchmark written by Tim Bray.

== See also ==
- Benchmark (computing)
