= Jonathan Oxer =

Australian software developer

- Jonathan Oxer at Linux.conf.au in 2007
- Born: 26 July 1970 (age 56); London, England
- Occupation: Director at Freetronics

Jonathan Oxer (born 26 July 1970, London, England) is a computer programmer, Debian developer, author, entrepreneur, and Free Software activist. He lives in Melbourne, Australia with his wife and their two children.

== Early life and education ==
Jonathan Oxer was born at St Mary Abbott's Hospital in London, England to Australian parents who were working in London at the time. In late 1970 his parents returned to Melbourne, Australia.

Oxer's primary education was at Blackwood Community School, a small alternative school created in the mid-1970s by a group of parents. The school was known for having an unstructured learning program that mixed students across all year levels and did not use scheduled class times.

Oxer's secondary education was at St Michael's Grammar School where he completed his Higher School Certificate (HSC) in 1989. In 1987 Oxer was one of a group of students from the school who conducted an extra-curricular project to use information published by researchers at IBM Zurich, the University of Alabama, and the University of Houston to create a sample of yttrium-barium-copper-oxide (YBCO) superconductor capable of exhibiting superconducting properties at the temperature of liquid nitrogen, which at the time was the highest-temperature superconductor yet created Oxer's contributions to the project included writing software to plot the optimum cooling curve of the material to maximise crystal alignment during the annealing process.

== Career ==
In 1994 Oxer founded Mission Internet, one of the first companies in the world to specialise in connecting database content to the Internet. In 2000 Mission Internet's operations became part of Internet Vision Technologies, a company formed in partnership with Andrew Minett. IVT was acquired by Advanced Solutions International (ASI) on 8 June 2017. Oxer is currently Director at Freetronics. Additionally, Oxer runs a site and YouTube channel SuperHouse featuring DIY video tutorials on home automation.

== Free Software ==
=== Debian Project ===
Oxer was admitted to the Debian Project in August 2002. He subsequently convened the Debian Miniconf in a different city every year in conjunction with Linux.conf.au: Perth in 2003, Adelaide in 2004, Canberra in 2005, Dunedin (New Zealand) in 2006, Sydney in 2007, and Melbourne in 2008.

=== Linux Australia Inc ===
Oxer was elected President of Linux Australia on 25 January 2005, serving three consecutive terms. He was also nominated for the 2008 election but did not accept the nomination.

Early in his first term Oxer was the focus of controversy surrounding the application for a trademark in Australia for the term "Linux". In many countries the trademark "Linux" is registered by or on behalf of the Linux Mark Institute, an organisation which administers the trademark on behalf of Linus Torvalds. Following an attempt by an unassociated commercial entity known as Linux Australia Pty Ltd to register the trademark within Australia, Linux Australia agreed to act as an agent of Linux Mark Institute to contest the pending trademark application by Linux Australia Pty Ltd and submit a counterclaim for the trademark. Subsequent action taken by Linux Australia included presentation of a request for support for the trademark application to a number of FOSS-related businesses in Australia by a lawyer acting on behalf of the organisation. As a result of the way the letter was worded some recipients misinterpreted it as a demand for payment for use of the trademark, causing a negative backlash within the FOSS community. Jon Hall, President of Linux Mark Institute, subsequently defended the actions of Linux Australia Inc and confirmed that the application was submitted on behalf of the organisation. The trademark applications by both Linux Australia Pty Ltd and Linux Australia Inc were ultimately denied.

During his incumbency Oxer was a vocal opponent of changes to Australian intellectual property law mandated by the Australia-United States Free Trade Agreement, and in particular the broader definition of technological protection measures.

In January 2020 he was awarded the Rusty Wrench Award for his services to the free software community in Australia.

== Cryptography ==
Oxer has coordinated the large PGP/GPG keysigning parties at every Linux.conf.au from 2004 onward, and to assist with key collection and management for large groups created the keysigning.org website. He also administers keys.keysigning.org, the only keyserver in the subkeys.pgp.net network geographically located in Australasia.

== RFID Implant ==
In March 2006 Oxer used a veterinary RFID tag implantation tool to implant an RFID tag under the skin of his left arm, and subsequently modified his house to allow the implanted tag to control items such as the door locks. He was subsequently labelled "Australia's geekiest geek" in The Age and Sydney Morning Herald.

== Author ==
Oxer is author of several books relating to computers and e-business:

- How To Build A Website And Stay Sane (Oft Press, 2005)
- Ubuntu Hacks (O'Reilly, 2006)
- How To Build A Website And Stay Sane, Second Edition (Lulu, 2007)
- Quickstart Guide to Google AdWords (Lulu, 2008)
- Practical Arduino (Apress, 2009)

Preceded by Pia Waugh	Linux Australia President; January 2005 - February 2008	Succeeded by Stewart Smith
