= FLISOL =

FLISOL logo

FLISoL, an acronym for Festival Latinoamericano de Instalación de Software Libre (Latin American free software install fest), is the biggest event for spreading free software since 2005, performed simultaneously in different countries of Latin America. In 2012, more than 290 cities from 20 countries of Latin America participated on a FLISoL.

This festival is an opportunity for all those people interested on know more about Software Libre. Getting involved makes it possible to get in touch with the world of Software Libre, meet other users, resolve doubts and questions, exchange opinions and experiences, attend to informative talks and others activities.

== Objective ==
Introduce Software Libre by its most known representative: Linux; or by installing Software Libre like LibreOffice, GIMP, Firefox and many more. During the event, operating systems or other free alternatives are installed for free to people who want to on their computers.

Also talks are given along with papers and workshops about local, national and Latin American topics related to Software Libre and its movement.

Is important to know, that the objective itself is to create a link and promote migration between the users (newbies and advanced) and Software Libre.

== Countries involved ==
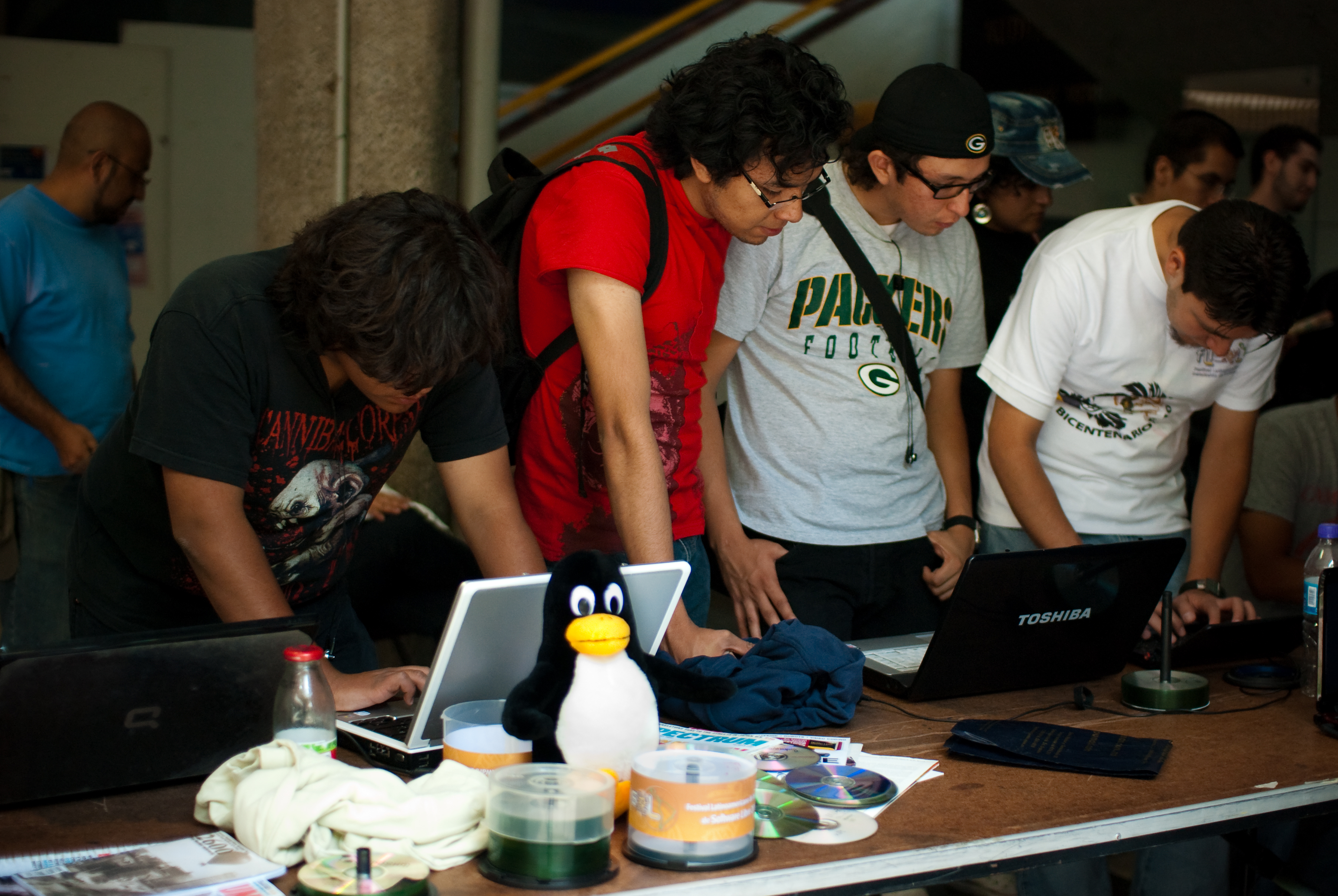
Mexico city, 2010

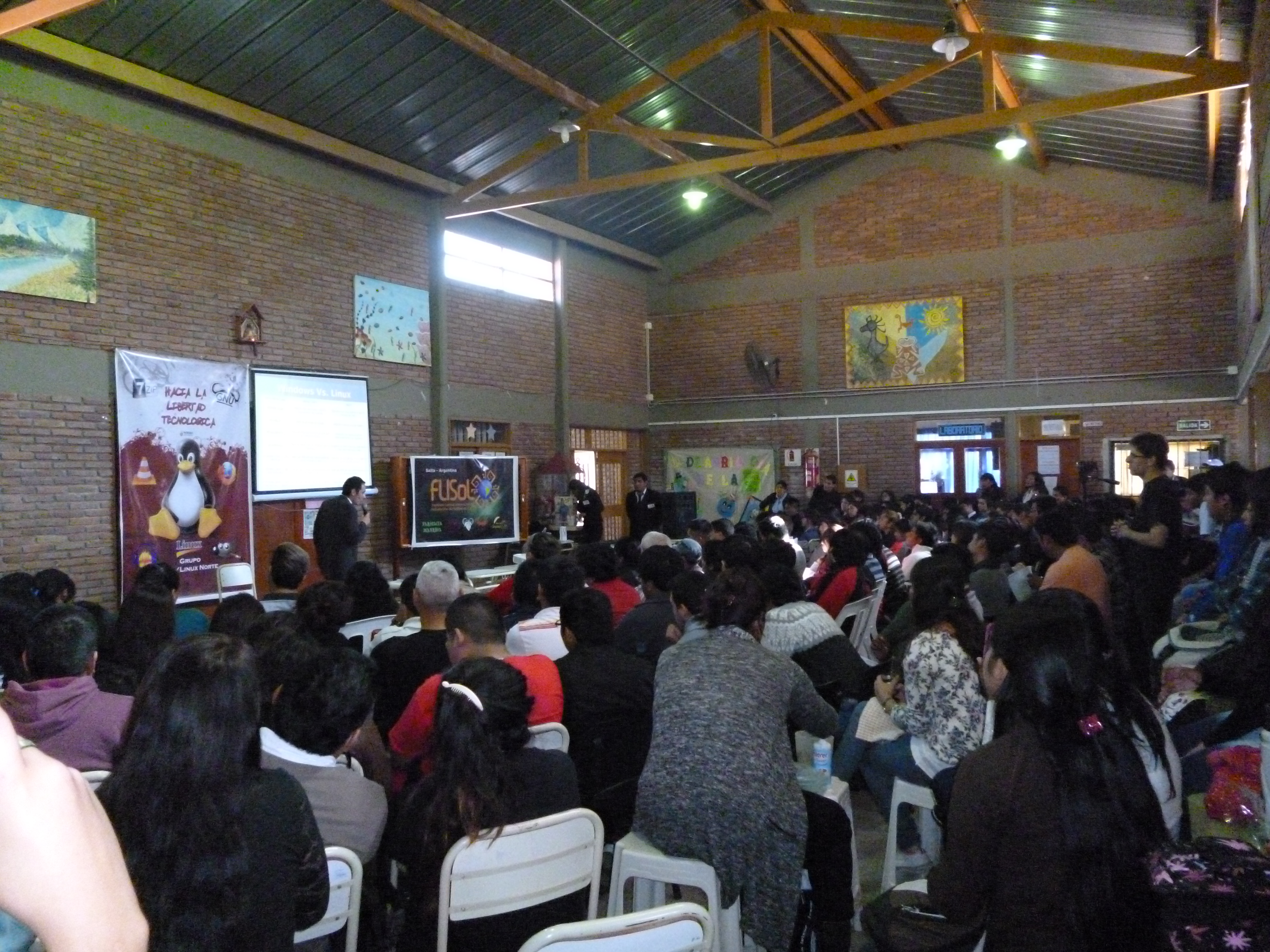
Salta city (Argentina), 2016

- Argentina
- Bolivia
- Brazil
- Chile
- Colombia
- Costa Rica
- Cuba
- Dominican Republic
- Ecuador
- El Salvador
- Guatemala
- Honduras
- Mexico
- Nicaragua
- Panama
- Paraguay
- Peru
- Spain
- Uruguay
- Venezuela

== See also ==
- Outline of free software
- Free software community
- Free software licenses
- Gratis versus Libre
- Libre knowledge
- Free content
- Free file format
- Open standards
- List of free software packages
- List of free software project directories
- List of formerly proprietary software
