= Pia Andrews =

Australian computer specialist

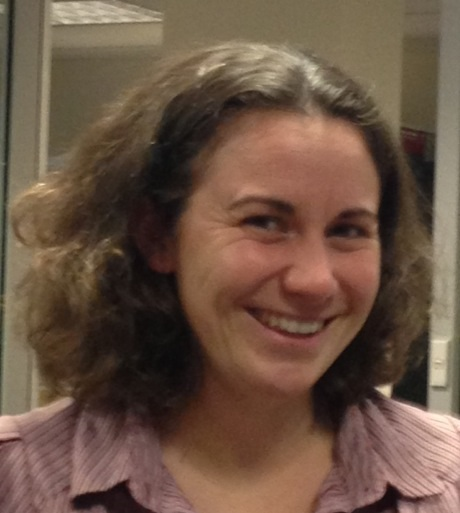
- Pia Andrews in 2013
- Born: Pia Smith; 1979 (age 46–47)
- Other name: Pia Waugh
- Occupations: Strategic Advisor, Public Sector
- Employer: Amazon Web Services (AWS)
- Known for: Leadership in Australian and international Free Software community
- Website: what are we doing today, brain?

Pia Andrews (née Pia Smith, also formerly known as Pia Waugh), born 1979, is an open government leader and the Special Advisor, Digital & Client Data Workstream Lead for Employment and Social Development Canada (ESDC).

Andrews spearheaded the growth of the Australian open government community by organising events such as GovHack, GovCamp and other events that bring together a diverse range of citizens who want to see government data made open for reuse. Previously, Andrews was known for her work as an Australian free software advocate. Her past positions include presidency of Software Freedom International; and presidency and vice-presidency of Linux Australia.

== Career ==
Andrews was employed by IT services company Volante for several years. In 2005 Andrews was appointed Research Co-ordinator of the Australian Service for Knowledge of Open Source Software (ASK-OSS) project. From 2006 Andrews, with her then-husband Jeff Waugh, was a director of Waugh Partners, an Australian Open Source consultancy. Waugh Partners won the 2007 NSW State Pearcey Award for Young Achievers for their work promoting Free Software to the Australian ICT industry. She was the project leader and a member of the Board of Directors of the One Laptop Per Child Australia program, launched in 2008.

Andrews is a self-taught computer specialist, and has also studied politics at a tertiary level. She has been involved in several projects and events promoting ICT careers to children and women.

In April 2009 Andrews announced her appointment as a policy advisor to Kate Lundy, and announced that in this role she was stepping aside from leadership and advocacy roles in community groups, and that she would no longer work for Waugh Partners.

In November 2012 Andrews joined the Australian Government Information Management Office (AGIMO). She was Director of Coordination and Gov 2.0 in the Technology and Procurement Division of Finance (under John Sheridan, the CTO of Australia) and in charge of Australian national open data site http://data.gov.au/

In 2014 Andrews was recognised for innovation and named one of Australia's 100 Women of Influence 2014 in The Australian Financial Review and Westpac 100 Women of Influence Awards.

Andrews was included in the 2018 list of the world's 100 most influential people in digital government, by Apolitical Group.

In August 2018 Andrews was appointed Executive Director of Digital Government in the New South Wales Department of Finance, Services and Innovation.

In February 2020 Andrews was appointed Special Advisor, Digital & Client Data Workstream Lead for Employment and Social Development Canada (ESDC).

== Free software community and volunteer positions ==
Andrews has held several positions in the Free Software community:

- Judge at the inaugural New Zealand Open Source Awards, 17 October 2007
- President, Software Freedom International, the organising body of Software Freedom Day, 2006–2008
- Member, organising committee for linux.conf.au 2007
- Second recipient of the Rusty Wrench award for Service to the Australian Open Source Community at linux.conf.au 2006.
- Vice-president of Linux Australia, 2005–2007
- President of Linux Australia, 2003–2004

Preceded by Anand Kumria	Linux Australia President; January 2003 - January 2005	Succeeded by Jonathan Oxer
