= LinuxChix =

Linux community

LinuxChix was a women-oriented Linux community project. It was formed to provide both technical and social support for women Linux users, although men were encouraged to contribute. Members of the community were referred to as "a Linux chick" (singular) and "LinuxChix" or "Linux Chix" (plural) regardless of gender. In 2025 due to decreasing interest the group ceased operations.

== History ==
LinuxChix was founded in 1999 by Deb Richardson, who was a technical writer and web-master at an open source consulting firm. Her reason for founding LinuxChix was to create an alternative to the "locker room mentality" of some other Linux User Groups and forums. There are two core rules: "be polite and be helpful."

LinuxChix started as an electronic mailing list called grrltalk. The growth of this mailing list led to the establishment of other mailing lists, beginning with techtalk for technical discussions and issues for discussion of women's political issues. LinuxChix received attention when ZDNet published an article on it, which was subsequently cross-posted on Slashdot.

== Leadership and structure ==
Deb Richardson oversaw the activities of LinuxChix until 2001, when she handed over global coordination and hosting to Melbourne programmer and writer Jenn Vesperman. Jenn Vesperman led the community in a mostly hands-off fashion, delegating almost all tasks, including mailing list administration and website maintenance, to a group of volunteers. During Jenn Vesperman's tenure, the number of mailing lists tripled with the newchix mailing list for those new to Linux, the courses mailing list used by LinuxChix to teach each other specific topics, and the grrls-only mailing list (the only list closed to male subscribers) founded by Val Henson in 2002. At around the same time, a LinuxChix IRC server was created.

The term LinuxChix refers to the organisation centered on the official website, the mailing lists and the IRC channels. The organisation has no official status, and the name is used by other loosely affiliated groups, including several local, continental, and national chapters which operate independently.

In March 2007, Jenn Vesperman announced that she was retiring as the coordinator and invited nominations for a new leader. Mary Gardiner was announced as the new coordinator In April 2007, planning to serve as coordinator until 2009, however she resigned in June 2007. Currently the organization is led by three lead volunteers known as the "Tres Chix" who are elected by popular vote. In August 2007, Sulamita Garcia, Akkana Peck and Carla Schroder were elected to these positions.

== Regional chapters ==
LinuxChix has over 15 regional chapters around the world. In 2004, a chapter was founded in Africa. In March 2007, on the International Women's Day, Australia's two LinuxChix chapters united to form a nationwide chapter called "AussieChix". The New Zealand chapter was established in February 2007.

== Events ==
Some local LinuxChix chapters hold regular meetings. Others only meet up on special occasions, such as visits from non-local members or in conjunction with technical conferences. In 2007, members of the Sydney chapter organized a LinuxChix miniconf at linux.conf.au at the University of New South Wales. Events are held on other special occasions; in 2005, for example, LinuxChix Africa organized an event to celebrate Software Freedom Day at Wits University.

=== LinuxChix labs ===
The Indian chapter of LinuxChix (a.k.a. IndiChix) led an initiative to establish Linux labs in a number of cities in India. These labs provide spaces equipped with PCs and internet connections where women can learn more about Linux and collaborate on contributions to the Libre software community. Labs have gone live in Bangalore, Delhi, Mumbai, and Pune.

== See also ==
- Ada Initiative
- National Center for Women & Information Technology
- Anita Borg Institute for Women and Technology
- Girl Geek Dinners
