= AdaCamp =

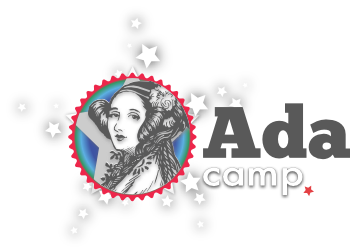
- AdaCamp logo

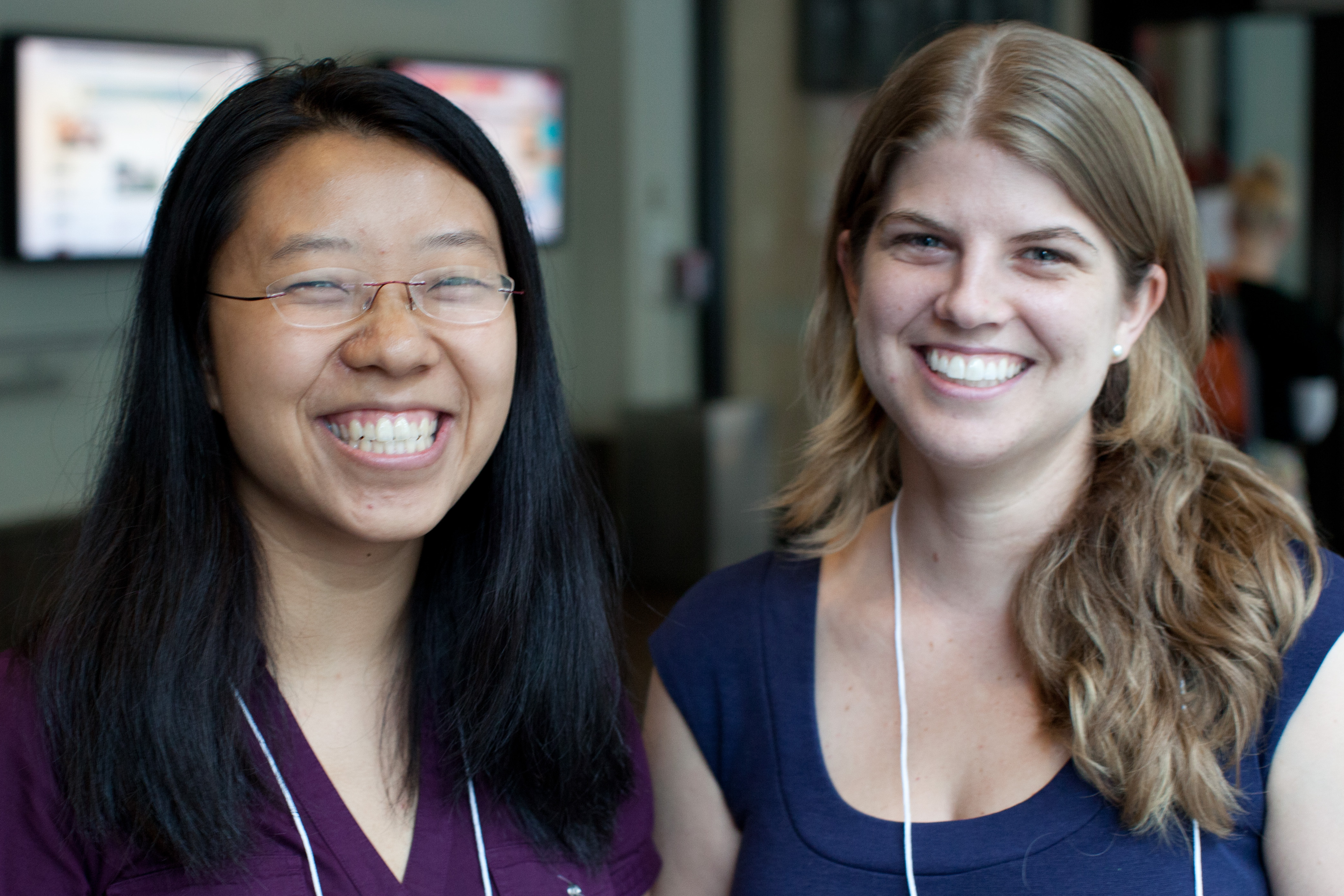
- AdaCamp DC attendees
- Status: inactive
- Genre: Open source technology and culture
- Frequency: Semi-annual
- Attendance: 100+
- Organizer: Ada Initiative
- Website: TAI/AdaCamp

AdaCamp was a series of unconferences organized by the Ada Initiative. AdaCamp was the only conference that focused on women's participation in open technology and culture, including the development of free and open source software and contributions to projects like Wikipedia. AdaCamps were among the projects and resources the Ada Initiative provided to make workplaces more friendly for women.

AdaCamps were held in Melbourne (January 2012), Washington, D.C. (July 2012), San Francisco (June 2013), Portland (June 2014), Berlin (October 2014), Bangalore (November 2015), and Montreal (April 2015). One hundred women from 10 countries participated at the July 2012 event, and it was larger than the initial Melbourne AdaCamp.

Co-founder Valerie Aurora said that the reasons for AdaCamp included "to make progress quickly on difficult problems, to share knowledge, and to network with each other." As an unconference, attendees lead sessions on subjects that they chose. Along with women interested in open source software, attendees could include women interested in open access, open education, hackerspaces, digital liberties activism, wiki culture, and other topics.

In June 2015, Ada Initiative organizers announced the end of AdaCamp and an upcoming open source "AdaCamp Toolkit", a series of planning documents meant to outline how to run an event like AdaCamp.

== See also ==
- Ada Lovelace, namesake of the sponsoring organization
- Women in computing
