= Intellectual Property Research Institute of Australia =

The Intellectual Property Research Institute of Australia (IPRIA) was established in 2002 as an initiative of IP Australia. Its mission is to increase the understanding, creation, use and exploitation of intellectual capital by Australian organisations and individuals. The focus is to move understanding and engagement with intellectual capital from a technical to a strategic consideration. Intellectual capital in this context is broader than formal intellectual property rights and includes the management of knowledge, personnel and intangible assets.

IPRIA is a collaborative research centre located at the University of Melbourne with significant funding from IP Australia. The core faculties are the Faculty of Business and Economics, the Melbourne Law School and the Melbourne Business School.

IPRIA's objectives are to:

- support the development of public policy in relation to intellectual property issues:
- optimise the protection, management and exploitation of intellectual capital by all Australian stakeholders, including research institutions, public and private sector interests; and
- help create an informed environment for, and contribute to, on-going public debate in Australia about intellectual capital issues.

The inaugural Director was academic legal scholar Professor Andrew Christie who served from 2002 to 2008 and Professor Beth Webster was the Director of IPRIA from 2008 to 2014. In 2015 and 2016 Professor Megan Richardson (law) and Associate Professor Kwanghui Lim were co-directors. In 2017 Professor Megan Richardson (law) became the sole Director.
