= Debian Conference =

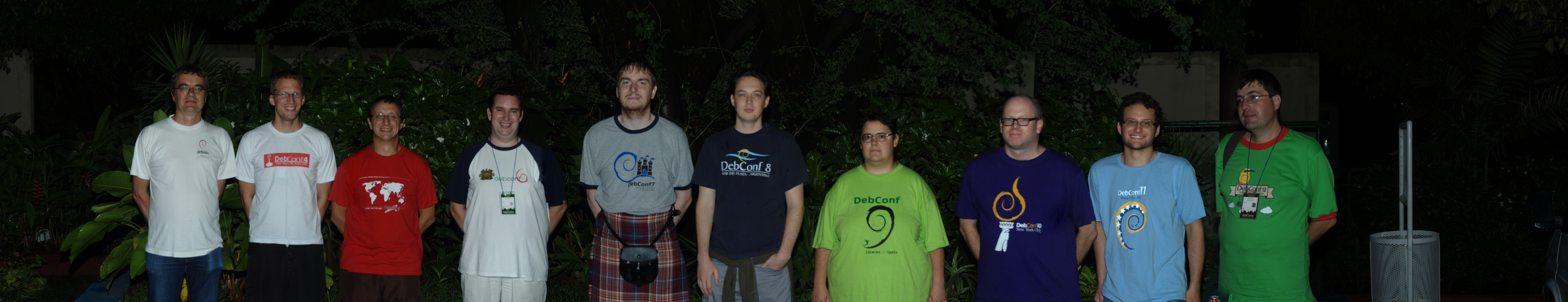
DebConf T-shirts from conferences 3 through 12.

DebConf, the Debian developers conference is the yearly conference where developers of the Debian operating system meet to discuss further development of the system.

Besides the scheduled workshops and talks, Debian developers take the opportunity to hack on the Debian system in a more informal setting. This has been institutionalised by introducing the DebCamp in the Oslo DebConf in 2003: a room is set aside and computing infrastructure provided.

== Locations ==
Locations of past and future DebConf events:

DebConf0	2000	July 5–9	Bordeaux, France
DebConf1	2001	July 2–5	Bordeaux, France
DebConf2	2002	July 5–7	Toronto, Canada
DebConf3	2003	July 18–20	Oslo, Norway
DebConf4	2004	May 26 – June 2	Porto Alegre, Brazil
DebConf5	2005	July 10–17	Helsinki, Finland
DebConf6	2006	May 14–22	Oaxtepec, Mexico
DebConf7	2007	June 17–23	Edinburgh, Scotland
DebConf8	2008	August 10–16	Mar del Plata, Argentina
DebConf9	2009	July 24–30	Cáceres, Spain
DebConf10	2010	August 1–7	New York City, United States
DebConf11	2011	July 24–30	Banja Luka, Bosnia and Herzegovina
DebConf12	2012	July 8–14	Managua, Nicaragua
DebConf13	2013	August 11–18	Vaumarcus, Switzerland
DebConf14	2014	August 23–31	Portland, Oregon, United States
DebConf15	2015	August 15–22	Heidelberg, Germany
DebConf16	2016	July 3–9	Cape Town, South Africa
DebConf17	2017	August 6–12	Montreal, Canada
DebConf18	2018	July 29 – August 4	Hsinchu, Taiwan
DebConf19	2019	July 21–28	Curitiba, Brazil
DebConf20	2020	August 23–29	Online only (due to the COVID-19 pandemic)
DebConf21	2021	August 24–28	Online only (due to the COVID-19 pandemic)
DebConf22	2022	July 17–24	Prizren, Kosovo
DebConf23	2023	September 10–17	Kochi, India
DebConf24	2024	July 28 – August 4	Busan, Republic of Korea
DebConf25	2025	July 14–21	Brest, France
DebConf26	2026	July 20–25	Santa Fe, Argentina

== Miniconf ==
These were one-day miniature conferences, originally held in association with the main linux.conf.au Australian Linux conference. They were targeted towards specific communities of interest and offered delegates an opportunity to network with other enthusiasts while immersing themselves in a specific topic or project.

Locations of past LCA Miniconf events:

Debian GNU/Linux: Australian Mini-Conference 2002	2002	February 4–5	Brisbane, Australia
Debian Miniconf2	2003	January 20–21	Perth, Australia
Debian Miniconf3	2004	January 12–13	Adelaide, Australia
Debian Miniconf4	2005	April 18–19	Canberra, Australia
Debian Miniconf5	2006	January 23–24	Dunedin, New Zealand
Debian Miniconf6	2007	January 15–16	Sydney

== MiniDebConf ==
This is a smaller Debian event, held annually in various places in the world.

Locations of past and future MiniDebConf events:

MiniDebConf 2006 Colombia	2006	August 19–20	Popayán, Colombia
MiniDebConf Centroamérica: Panamá	2010	March 20–23	Panama City, Panama
MiniDebConf 2010 Germany	2010	June 10–11	Berlin, Germany
MiniDebConf 2010 India	2010	August 7–8	Pune, India
MiniDebConf 2010 France	2010	October 30–31	Paris, France
MiniDebConf 2010 Vietnam	2010	November 12–14	Ho Chi Minh City, Vietnam
MiniDebConf 2012 France	2012	November 24–25	Paris, France
MiniDebConf 2013 India	2013	February 22–24	Kozhikode, India
MiniDebConf 2013 UK	2013	November 14–17	Cambridge, United Kingdom
MiniDebConf 2014 France	2012	January 18–19	Paris, France
MiniDebConf 2014 Spain	2014	March 15–16	Barcelona, Spain
MiniDebConf 2014 India(Debutsav)	2014	October 17–18	Kollam, India
MiniDebConf 2014 UK	2014	November 6–9	Cambridge, United Kingdom
MiniDebConf 2015 New-Zealand	2015	January 10–12	Auckland, New Zealand
MiniDebConf 2015 India	2015	January 17–18	Mumbai, India
MiniDebConf 2015 France	2015	April 11–12	Lyon, France
MiniDebConf 2015 Romania	2015	May 16–17	Bucharest, Romania
MiniDebConf 2015 UK	2015	November 5–8	Cambridge, United Kingdom
MiniDebConf 2016 Curitiba	2016	March 5–6	Curitiba, Brazil
MiniDebConf 2016 UK	2016	November 10–13	Cambridge, United Kingdom
MiniDebConf 2017 UK	2017	November 23–26	Cambridge, United Kingdom
MiniDebConf 2018 Hamburg	2018	May 16–20	Hamburg, Germany
MiniDebConf 2019 Hamburg	2019	June 5–9	Hamburg, Germany
MiniDebConf India 2021	2021	January 23-24	Online
MiniDebConf 2021 Regensburg	2021	October 2-3	Regensburg, Germany
MiniDebConf Portugal 2023	2023	February 13-16	Lisbon, Portugal
MiniDebConf Uruguay 2023	2023	November 9–11	Montevideo, Uruguay
MiniDebConf 2023 UK	2023	November 23–26	Cambridge, United Kingdom
MiniDebConf Santa Fe 2024	2024	March 09–10	Santa Fe, Argentina
MiniDebConf 2024 UK	2024	October 10–13	Cambridge, United Kingdom
MiniDebConf Busan 2025	2025	November 22–23	Busan, Republic of Korea

== Attendance ==
According to a 2013 brochure, the conference had about 30 attendees in 2000 while in 2011 there were around 300 attendees, and about 250 are expected.
