= Journaling block device =

JBD, or journaling block device, is a generic block device journaling layer in the Linux kernel written by Stephen Tweedie from Red Hat. JBD is filesystem-independent. ext3, ext4 and OCFS2 are known to use JBD.

JBD exists in two versions, JBD and JBD2. JBD was created with ext3 in 1998. JBD2 was forked from JBD in 2006 with ext4, with the goal of supporting a 64-bit (as opposed to 32-bit-only in JBD) block number. As a result, the maximum volume size in ext4 is increased to 1 EiB compared to 16 TiB in ext3 (assuming 4 KiB blocks). JBD2 is backward-compatible. OCFS2 starting from Linux 2.6.28 uses JBD2. The old JBD was removed with the dedicated ext3 driver in Linux 4.3 (2015).

== JBD structures ==
=== Atomic handle ===
An atomic handle is basically a collection of all the low-level changes that occur during a single high-level atomic update to the file system. The atomic handle guarantees that the high-level update either happens or not, because the actual changes to the file system are flushed only after logging the atomic handle in the journal.

=== Transaction ===
For the sake of efficiency and performance, JBD groups several atomic handles into a single transaction, which is written to the journal after a fixed amount of time elapses or there is no free space left on the journal to fit it.

The transaction has several states:

- Running - it means that the transaction is still live and can accept more handles
- Locked - not accepting new handles, but the existing ones are still unfinished
- Flush - the transaction is complete and is being written to the journal
- Commit - the transaction is written to the journal and now the changes are being applied to the file system
- Finished - the transaction has been fully written to the journal and the block device. It can be deleted from the journal.

== Recovery ==
Based on the transaction states, the JBD is able to determine which transactions need to be replayed (or reapplied) to the file system.
