= Ada Initiative =

Organization that sought to increase women's participation in open-source technology

- Founded: 2011; 15 years ago
- Founder: Valerie Aurora; Mary Gardiner
- Dissolved: October 2015; 11 years ago
- Type: 501(c)(3)
- Purpose: Women's rights, FOSS, free-software community
- Location: United States
- Website: adainitiative.org

The Ada Initiative was a non-profit organization that sought to increase women's participation in the free culture movement, open-source technology and open culture. The organization was founded in 2011 by Linux kernel developer and open source advocate Valerie Aurora and open source developer and advocate Mary Gardiner (the founder of AussieChix, the largest organization for women in open source in Australia). It was named after Ada Lovelace, one of the world's first computer programmers, as is the Ada programming language. In August 2015, the Ada Initiative board announced that the organization would shut down in October 2015. According to the announcement, the Initiative's executive leadership decided to step down, and the organization was unable to find acceptable replacement leaders.

== History ==
Valerie Aurora, already an activist for women in open source, joined Mary Gardiner and members of Geek Feminism to develop anti-harassment policies for conferences after Noirin Shirley was sexually assaulted at ApacheCon 2010. Together with Gardiner, she founded the Ada Initiative in February 2011.

In 2014, Valerie Aurora announced her intent to step down as executive director of the Ada Initiative, and an executive search committee was formed to find her replacement. Mary Gardiner, deputy executive director, chose not to be a candidate. The committee, headed by Sumana Harihareswara and Mary Gardiner, announced in March 2015 that the Ada Initiative had hired Crystal Huff as the new executive director. Huff, formerly of Luminoso in Boston, continued to work from Massachusetts in her new role.

In August 2015, the Ada Initiative announced that the organization would close in mid-October, 2015. The announcement described the leadership challenge facing the Initiative: neither co-founder intended to continue as executive director. According to the post on the Ada Initiative website:

We felt the likelihood of finding a new ED who could effectively fit into Valerie’s shoes was low. We also considered several other options for continuing the organization, including changing its programs, or becoming volunteer-only. After much deliberation, the board decided to do an orderly shutdown of the Ada Initiative, in which the organization would open source all of our remaining knowledge and expertise in freely reusable and modifiable form. We don’t feel like non-profits need to exist forever. The Ada Initiative did a lot of great work, and we are happy about it.

The previous hire of Crystal Huff, announced several months earlier, was not mentioned other than to note "that hire didn't work out."

== Administration ==
All services provided by the Ada Initiative were pro bono, and the organization was supported by member donations. In the summer of 2011, the Ada Initiative launched a campaign to raise start-up funds with a goal of contributions from 100 funders. The campaign wrapped up six days before its planned deadline. The organization's first major sponsor was Linux Australia, who provided support alongside Puppet Labs, DreamHost, The Mail Archive and Google. Aurora and Gardiner were the only staff members, serving full-time roles in the organization.

=== Board and advisory board ===
The Ada Initiative was governed by a seven-person board of directors, who oversaw its management. The board included co-founder Mary Gardiner, Sue Gardner, Amelia Greenhall, Rachel Chalmers, Alicia Gibb, Andrea Horbinski and Marina Zhurakhinskaya. An advisory board of about 30 members provided input about ideas and projects.

== Initiatives ==
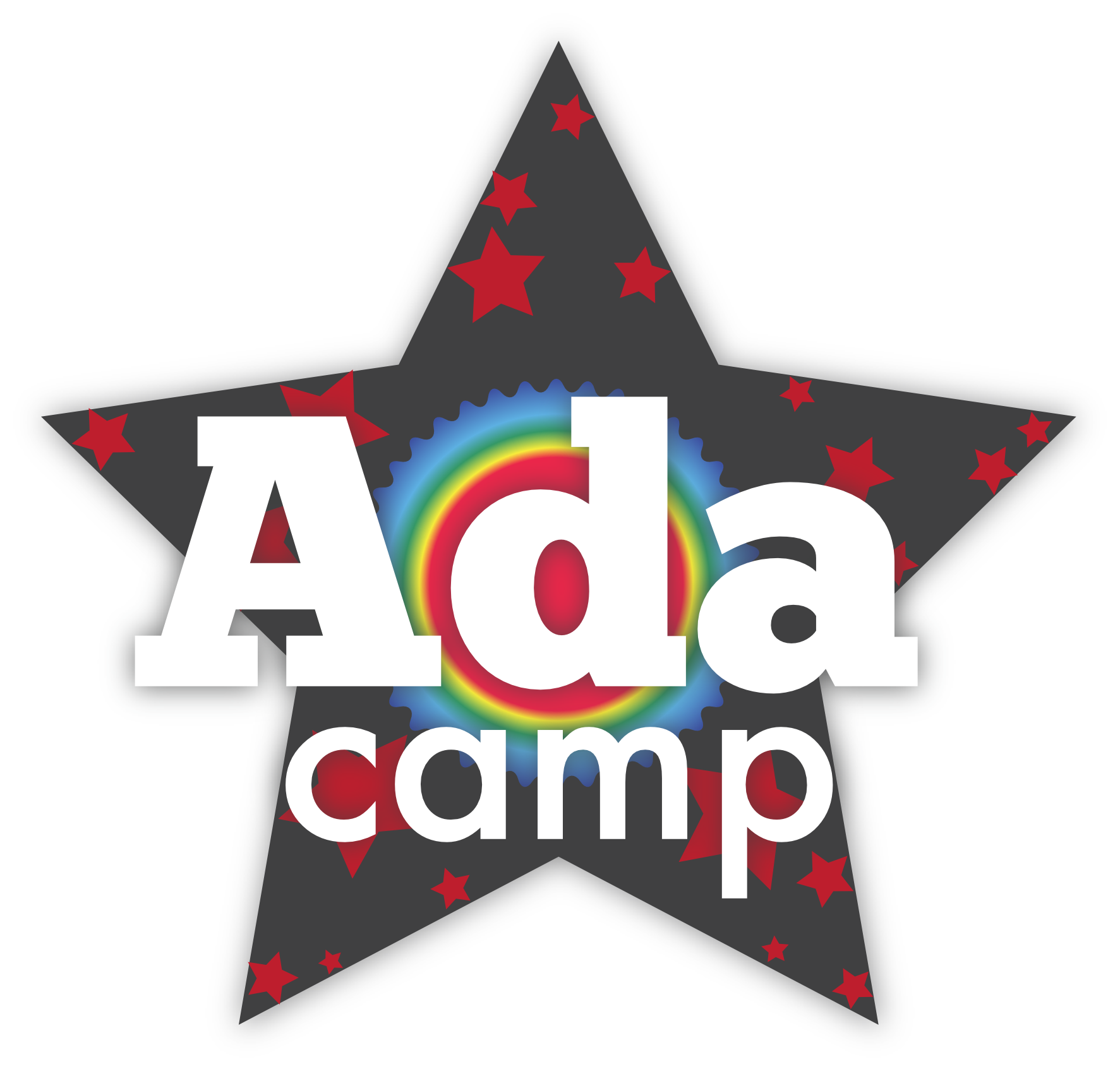
Logo of AdaCamp, the unconference for women in open stuff

In collaboration with members of LinuxChix, Geek Feminism and other groups, the Ada Initiative developed anti-harassment policies for conferences. The Ada Initiative also worked with open source conference organizers to adopt, create and communicate policies to make conferences safer and more inviting for all attendees, particularly women. Conferences such as Ubuntu Developer Summits and all Linux Foundation events, including LinuxCon, have adopted policies based on the Ada Initiative's work.

The Ada Initiative developed policy framework for creating a Women in Open Source Scholarship and programming guides for outreach projects and events. The organization also hosted workshops and training. These workshops and programs consisted of Allies Workshops for male and institutional supporters and "First Patch Week" programs, which encourages women's participation in Free and open source software (FOSS) through mentoring. The workshop framework is freely available, although the Ada Initiative also offered facilitators to conduct the workshops in person.

By encouraging women's participation in open-source culture, the Ada Initiative encouraged women to engage in open source professionally and full-time- not just as volunteers. The organization also researched women's roles and experiences in open source, focusing on bringing research up to date; the last survey done of the gender balance in open source had been completed in 2006. Research methodology and a new survey were produced in 2011. A repeat of the survey took place in 2013, with hopes to provide a standard resource for the industry. The 2011 survey invited participants of any gender and inquired about subjects regarding open source and free software, hardware, open mapping, and other related open source areas, as well as free culture such as Creative Commons, online activism, mashup, maker, hacker spaces and related communities.

The Ada Initiative was the organizer of AdaCamp, an unconference "dedicated to increasing women’s participation in open technology and culture." Seven AdaCamps were held between 2012 and 2015.

== Violet Blue's security presentation ==
In February 2013, the organizers of the Security B-Sides San Francisco conference canceled speaker Violet Blue's talk, sex +/- drugs: known vulns and exploits, due to concerns raised by the Ada Initiative that it contained rape triggers, as well as the Ada Initiative's consideration of the subject as off-topic for a security conference. The abrupt cancellation provoked intense discussion in the information security industry. Since the event at B-Sides SF, lead organizer Ian Fung has outlined his account of the interactions between Blue, Aurora, and the Ada Initiative on the B-Sides SF front page, contradicting some of the claims made by both the Ada Initiative and Blue.

== See also ==
- Ada Project, The
- Anita Borg Institute for Women and Technology
- Contributor Covenant
- Discrimination
- Sexism in the technology industry
- Women in computing
