= Rusty Russell =

Australian computer programmer

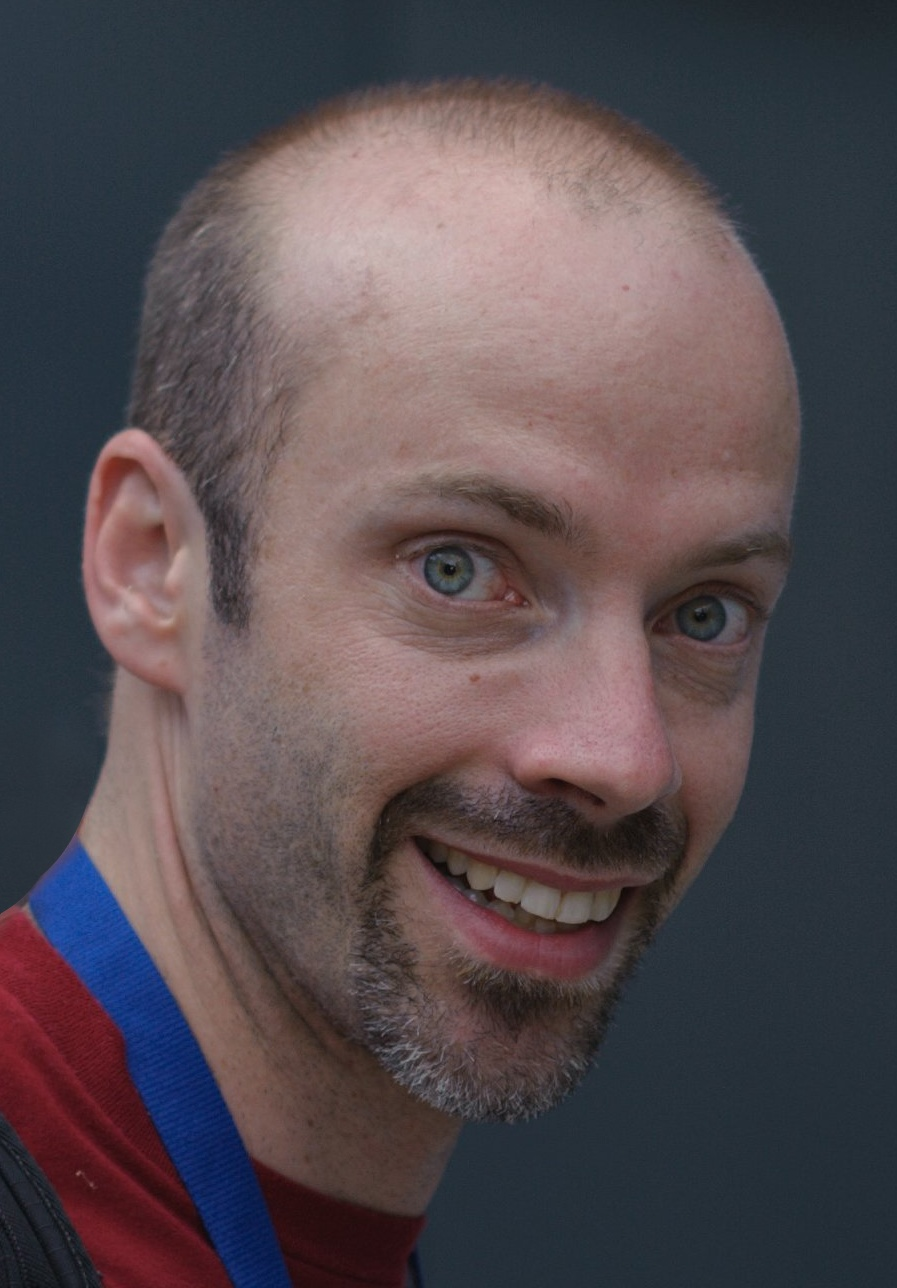
- Rusty Russell at linux.conf.au in January 2011
- Born: Paul Russell; 18 January 1973 (age 53); London, UK
- Occupation: Computer programmer
- Employer: Blockstream
- Known for: Linux kernel development, Free Software advocacy
- Website: http://rusty.ozlabs.org/

Rusty Russell is an Australian free software programmer and advocate, known for his work on the Linux kernel's networking subsystem and the Filesystem Hierarchy Standard.

== Software development ==
Russell wrote the packet filtering systems ipchains and netfilter/iptables in the Linux operating system kernel. Linus Torvalds referred to him as one of his "top deputies" in 2003. In 2002, Russell announced the creation of the Trivial Patch Monkey, an email address for kernel hackers to submit trivial patches such as spelling errors, one-liners, documentation tweaks and other minor amendments to the code base. Adrian Bunk took over the role in 2005. In 2006 Russell started work as the major developer of the "lguest" virtualisation system in the Linux Kernel. In October 2009, he was officially given a SAMBA Team T-shirt welcoming him to the Samba Team. In 2014 he started pettycoin, a cryptocurrency project. Russell authored the majority part of Bitcoin's Lightning Network protocol specification.

== Australian Free Software community ==
An interview with Russell at linux.conf.au 2014.

Russell conceived and conducted the Conference of Australian Linux Users at Monash University in 1999, the forerunner of the annual linux.conf.au conference series.

Russell is intellectual property advisor to Linux Australia and is active in advocating against and critiquing intellectual property elements of the Free Trade Agreement between Australia and the United States. He was also a member of the Linux Australia committee in 2004.

Russell was the recipient of the inaugural (and eponymous) Rusty Wrench award for service to the free software community at linux.conf.au 2005.

== Bibliography ==
- Russell, Rusty; Quinlan, Daniel, eds. (23 May 2001). "Filesystem Hierarchy Standard — Version 2.2 final Filesystem Hierarchy Standard Group" (PDF). Filesystem Hierarchy Standard.
- Russell, Rusty; Quinlan, Daniel; Yeoh, Christopher, eds. (28 January 2004). "Filesystem Hierarchy Standard - Filesystem Hierarchy Standard Group" (PDF). Filesystem Hierarchy Standard.
