= Open Source Industry Australia =

Open Source Industry Australia (OSIA) is an Australian body created to "further the cause of both Free and Open Source Software (FOSS)". Founded in 2004 by Arjen Lentz, Con Zymaris and Brendan Scott, OSIA was formed after discussions between prominent members of the open source business community at linux.conf.au 2004 in Adelaide. Del Elson took on the role of the Secretary.

== See also ==
- AUUG
- Linux Australia
