= Linux user group =

Organization of computer users

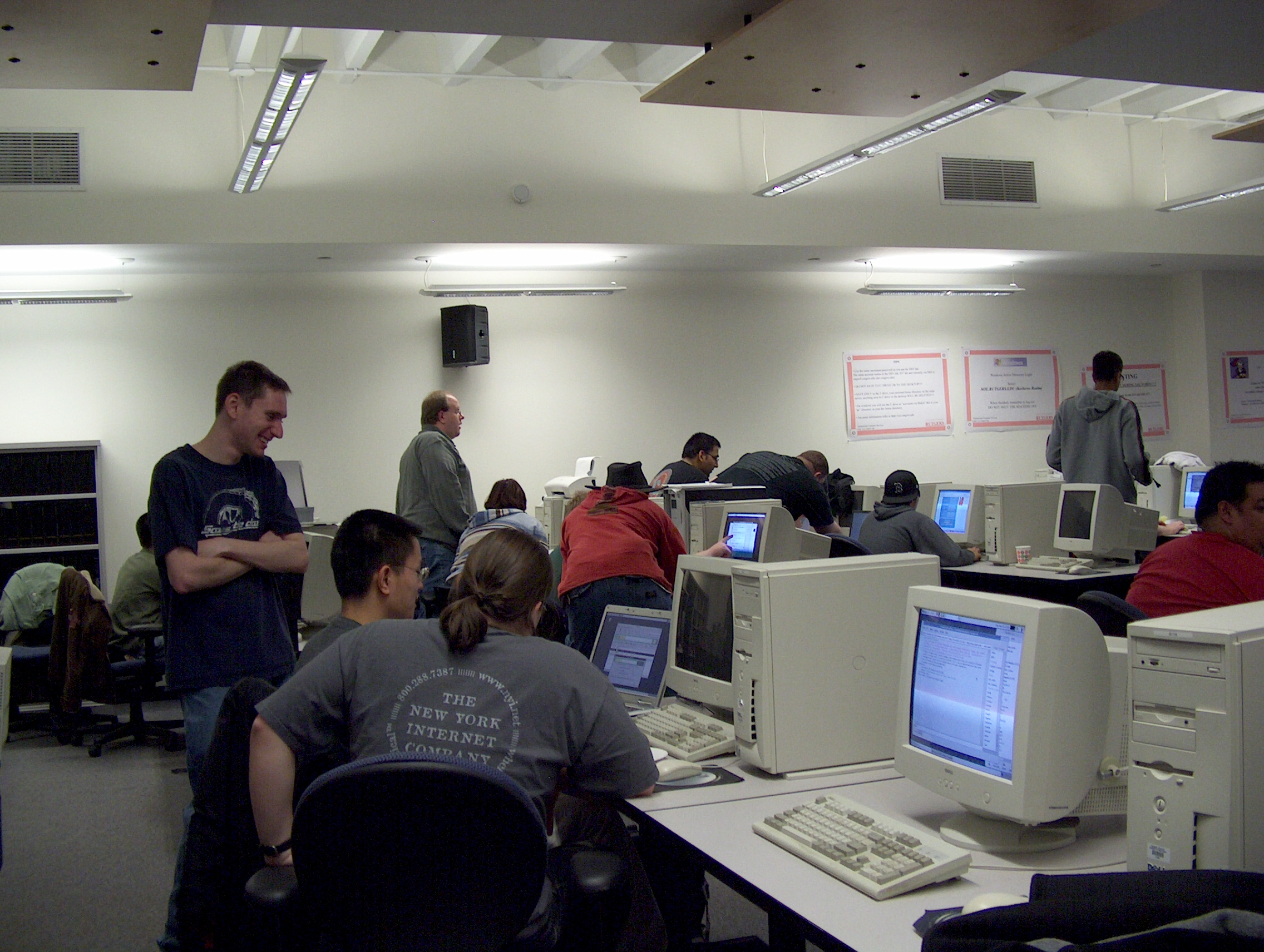
Installfest hosted by the Rutgers University Student Linux Users' Group in 2005.

A Linux User Group or Linux Users' Group (LUG) or GNU/Linux User Group (GLUG) is a private, generally non-profit or not-for-profit organization that provides support and/or education for Linux users, particularly for inexperienced users. The term commonly refers to local groups that meet in person but is also used to refer to online support groups that may have members spread over a very wide area and that do not organize, or are not dependent on, physical meetings. Many LUGs encompass FreeBSD and other free-software / open source Unix-based operating systems.

== Local LUGs ==
Local Linux user groups meet (typically weekly to monthly) to provide support and/or arrange and host presentations for Linux users, particularly for inexperienced users. Given that Linux is not dominated by any specific corporate or institutional entity, LUG meetings typically encompass a broader range of topics than do the meetings of other user groups. Linux is predominantly user-supported, and some support is vastly easier via telephone or in person than over e-mail or USENET. LUGs are still primarily focused on hobbyist users and professionals who are engaged in self-directed study.

SVLUG is among the oldest and largest LUGs. It was originally formed as a Special Interest Group for the Silicon Valley Computer Society, founded by Daniel Kionka to support Xenix and "low-cost PC UNIX systems" (and later became focused on Linux, as the dominant free implementation of Unix).

According to the Linux User Group HOWTO:

Computer user groups are not new. In fact, they were central to the personal computer's history: Microcomputers arose in large part to satisfy demand for affordable, personal access to computing resources from electronics, ham radio, and other hobbyist user groups. Giants like IBM eventually discovered the PC to be a good and profitable thing, but initial impetus came from the grassroots.

To give just one indication of how LUGs differ from traditional user groups: Traditional groups must closely monitor what software users redistribute at meetings. While illegal copying of restricted proprietary software certainly occurred, it was officially discouraged—for good reason. At LUG meetings, however, that entire mindset simply does not apply: Far from being forbidden, unrestricted copying of Linux should be among a LUG's primary goals. In fact, there is anecdotal evidence of traditional user groups having difficulty adapting to Linux's ability to be lawfully copied at will.

=== Typical activities ===
LUGs typically meet once per month, in facilities freely provided by universities, colleges, community centers, private corporations, or banquet rooms in restaurants. For example, Silicon Valley's SVLUG met for about 10 years in the back of a Carl's Jr. restaurant, and has met for the last several years in meeting rooms at Cisco Systems and, more recently, Symantec. Similarly, BALUG (a San Francisco LUG) met for many years in the banquet room above the Four Seas Restaurant in San Francisco's Chinatown.

Most LUGs are free, requiring no monthly or annual dues. In many cases, the participants are encouraged to patronize the host venues (esp. in restaurant meetings, by buying dinner).

Some LUGs are informal conferences or round table discussions; members simply sit around and chat about Linux-related topics. Some provide formal presentations. For example, Linus Torvalds has occasionally talked to SVLUG or BALUG (which both are close to his former home in Silicon Valley), and Hans Reiser (creator of ReiserFS) presented his early design plans at an SVLUG meeting. Presenters might be anyone in the community with something interesting to say. Occasionally, corporations will sponsor or encourage their employees to speak at user groups to promote their products. LUGs generally require that these presentations provide technically interesting content, rather than overt sales pitches. Often, LUG meetings provide an opportunity for members and guests to make announcements, especially for jobs offered and/or wanted, pleas for assistance (free or professional consulting), and hardware for sale or to be given away "to a good home".

LUGs near each other geographically sometimes get together to hold conferences and share knowledge among peers. For example, in Central America, in 2009, the first Encuentro Centro Americano de Software Libre was held in Nicaragua, where LUGs from the region, from Belize to Panama, attended. Groups from other countries are also invited. In 2010, this conference was held in Punta Renas, Nicaragua; where there were members from the region, including from Germany and Mexico. In 2011, it was held in El Salvador. These events usually take place in summer, as most of the LUG members are students. As a second example, several Los Angeles-area LUGs sponsor and staff the annual Southern California Linux Expo (SCALE) conference.

Many LUGs also organize installfests (FreeBSD groups tend to refer to them as "installations"), which are opportunities for experienced Linux users to help others, especially novices with installation and configuration of Linux systems. Installfests may also have break-out sessions for teaching new tips and tricks—performance tuning, security hardening, etc.

A few LUGs have developed projects of regional or even international stature. For example, the Uganda Linux User Group operates in 3 major cities and frequently coordinates national and international events that have featured guests as high-profile as Tim Berners-Lee. Cyberstorm.mu, a Linux User Group from Mauritius, trains high school students on Linux to compete in Google Code-in and organises Hackathons focused on Linux. The Bellingham Linux Users Group (BLUG), in Bellingham, Washington, holds the annual LinuxFest Northwest, which attracts large numbers of participants from throughout the region, including western Canada. Likewise, Bellevue Linux Users Group (BELUG), which meets in a bookstore in Bellevue, Washington, has developed The Linux Information Project (LINFO).

LUGs sometimes are gifted with surplus books, back issues of Linux magazines, copies of CDs/DVDs, and other promotional items to give away to their members.

Other than these "official" LUG activities, the meetings provide opportunities for users to socialize. Members often exchange e-mail addresses, URLs, and phone numbers, and provide technical support or collaborate on study or development projects together. Some local LUGs share characteristics of online LUGs, meeting on IRC or hosting support mailing lists, in addition to the physical meetings. LUGs may also have an online blog presence; for example OCLUG, OSU LUG, and Nottingham LUG host "Planet" pages aggregating members' blogs.

LUGs can also be a natural place for local organizations to find Linux expertise. Professors for Unix classes at San Jose State University came to SVLUG in the early days of Linux to find guest lecturers for their classes; some LUGs provide computer help to schools and non-profit organizations, and perform other community outreach services.

=== Installfests ===
[...] an installfest is a gathering at which experienced Linux users assist less experienced users with the installation and configuration of Linux distributions, and where Linux users can bring Linux systems to receive assistance with system problem remediation.

— Linux Documentation Project

An Installfest (a portmanteau of installation and festival) is an event, generally sponsored by a local Linux User Group, university, or LAN party, at which people get together to do mass installations of computer operating systems or software, most often Linux and other open source software.

It is generally an advocacy and community-building event, where novices bring their computers along with their preferred operating system installation disks to the location of the installfest, and experienced users help them in getting started and troubleshooting problems. Sometimes, a Linux distribution and informative flyers are given for free to the attendees. Some events ask for participants to bring power strips and network switches, if available.

Installfests welcome all skill levels from complete novice to expert. An installfest will range from an informal get together to festivals involving music. The tone and scope of a specific event will depend on the organization sponsoring it. Writing in the BBC's Internet Blog in 2008, George Wright described a mini-installfest as being "as painless as [he]'d imagined" and "[with] a bit of luck, it can be straightforward".

The Ubuntu Global Jam includes installfests.

Simultaneous installfests in many Latin American cities are coordinated annually through FLISOL.

=== Hackfests ===
A Hackfest (a portmanteau of hack and festival) is an event, generally sponsored by a local Linux user group, university, or LAN party, at which people get together to demonstrate security issues or reverse engineer computer operating systems or software, most often Linux and other open source software.

=== SFD ===
Local LUGs celebrate Software Freedom Day by going out and promoting Free and Open Source Software (FOSS). Free Ubuntu CDs are given out along with brochures and any information about FOSS. This event is commonly held on the third Saturday of September.

== Online LUGs ==
Not all online Linux support groups refer to themselves as "a LUG", and the use of the word is sometimes (as in the Linux User Group HOWTO) intended to specifically refer to groups of Linux users that organize regular meetings. However, the LUG indexes list groups with members over a large geographical area, and, over time, organizations like the EU LUG, for Linux users throughout the European Union (as of 2005, apparently defunct) use the term LUG to refer to themselves.

Online LUGs use mailing lists, bulletin boards, and IRC as their primary method of communication, with members meeting physically seldom or not at all. As with local LUGs, some groups are limited to technical discussions and others seek to form social bonds between Linux users by having "chat" or "off topic" forums.

Reasons for forming or joining an online LUG differ: Some members of online LUGs may be relatively isolated without a local LUG accessible, or with only a few other Linux users in their area.

== Women in Free Software Communities ==
The online group LinuxChix is a worldwide LUG and social group that was founded to provide technical and social support for women Linux users.

An EC-funded study (2006) summarized in the Flosspols report, indicates that about 1.5% of FLOSS community members were female, compared with 28% in proprietary software. The Ubuntu Census Survey (June 2006) also reflects a similar female ratio with 2.4% women actively volunteering in the Ubuntu community.

Other *-women communities are :

- Ubuntu-Women seeks to balance and diversify the Ubuntu Community, by actively engaging in discussions with women and encouraging them to participate and become more involved within the Ubuntu community.
- Debian-Women seeks to balance and diversify the Debian Project, by actively engaging with interested women and encouraging them to become more involved with Debian.
- Gnome-Women is a group dedicated to providing encouragement for women to contribute to GNOME, a free and open-source Linux/Unix desktop suite.
- KDE-Women is about building a community of female KDE contributors and users.
- Apache-Women has a mailing list for discussions.
- Fedora-Women program aims to provide a forum for the women of the Fedora Community.
- Arch Linux Women is an all-inclusive Linux user group that focuses on encouraging women to get involved in the Arch Linux community.

== See also ==
- Computer User Group
- Free software community
- Hackerspace
- LAN party
- LinuxChix
- Macintosh User Group
- New Economy
