= Linux.conf.au =

Linux and open source conference

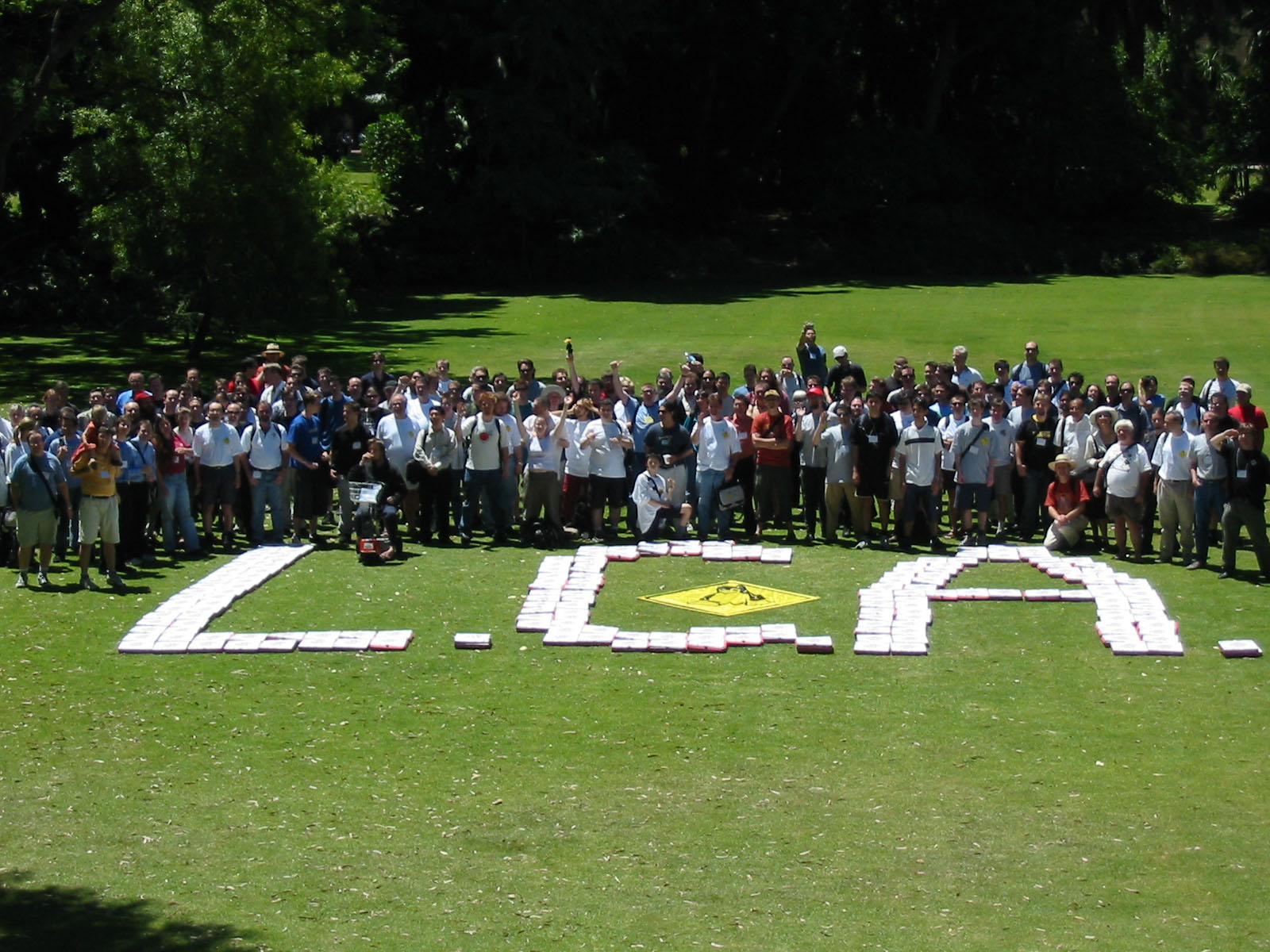
Last day of Linux.conf.au 2003

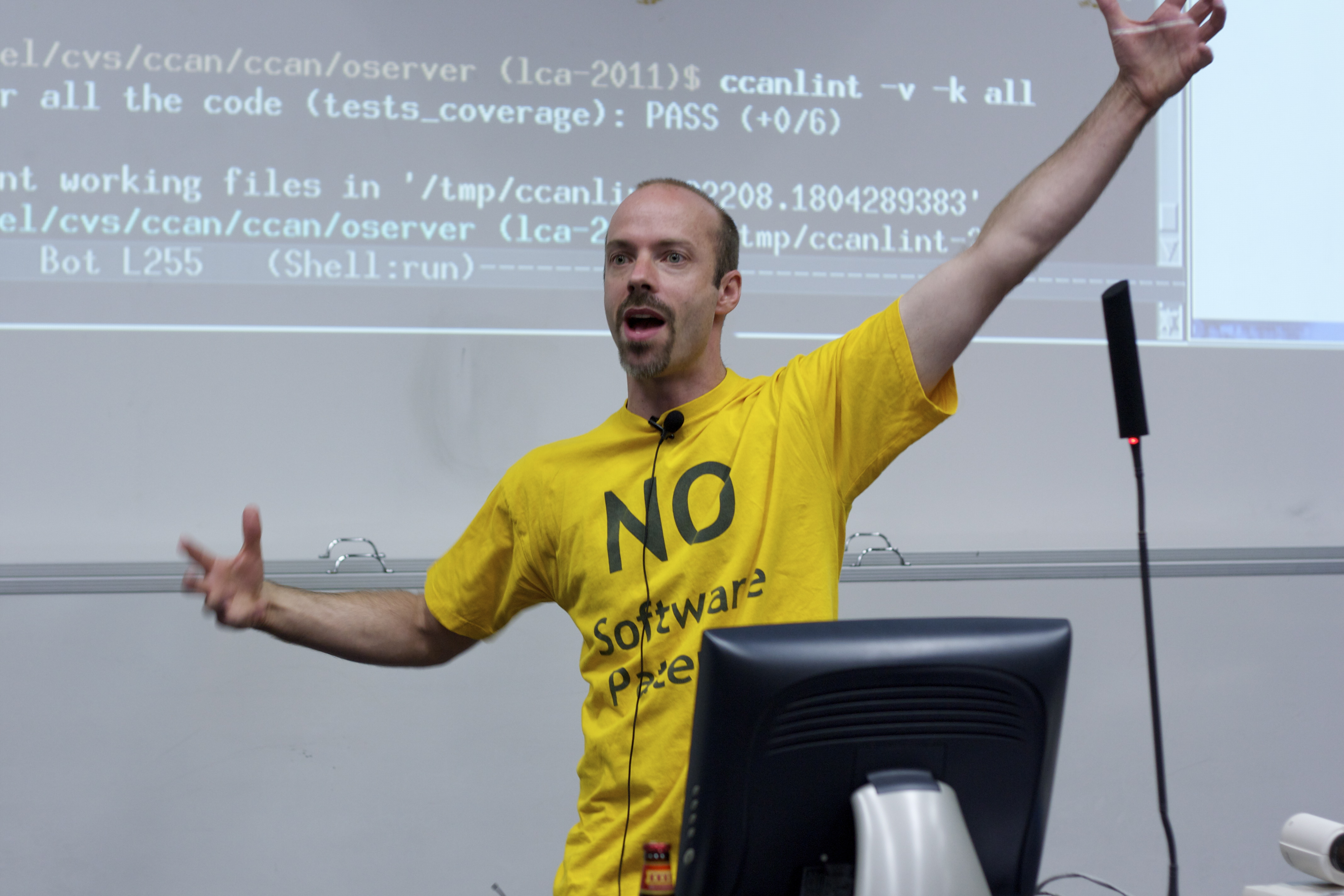
Rusty Russell speaking at Linux.conf.au 2011

linux.conf.au (often abbreviated as lca or LCA) is Australasia's regional Linux and open source conference. It is a roaming conference, held in a different Australian or New Zealand city every year, coordinated by Linux Australia and organised by local volunteers.

The conference is a non-profit event, with any surplus funds being used to seed the following year's conference and to support the Australian Linux and open source communities. The name is the conference's URL, using the uncommon second-level domain .conf.au.

Although several online events were run post-COVID, since 2023 Linux Australia has instead auspiced Everything Open. This is a shorter three-day conference that follows a similar format - but without the additional two days of Miniconfs.

== Conference history ==
In 1999, Linux kernel hacker Rusty Russell organised the Conference of Australian Linux Users in Melbourne. The first conference held under the linux.conf.au name was held two years later in Sydney. The conference is generally held in a different Australian city each time; although from 2006 onward, New Zealand cities have also been hosts.

Event	Date	Venue and host city	Keynote Speakers	Resources
CALU 1999	Jul 9 – Jul 11 1999	Monash University (Victoria (state)) Melbourne; Victoria	Jon 'maddog' Hall	1999
linux.conf.au 2001	Jan 17 – Jan 20 2001	University of New South Wales; Sydney; New South Wales	Alan Cox, David Miller, Andrew Tridgell	2001
linux.conf.au 2002	Feb 6 – Feb 9 2002	University of Queensland; Brisbane; Queensland	Andrew Tridgell, Jeremy Allison, Michi Henning, Theodore Tso	2002
linux.conf.au 2003	Jan 20 – Jan 25 2003	University of Western Australia; Perth; Western Australia	Rusty Russell, Bdale Garbee, Andrew Tridgell	2003
linux.conf.au 2004	Jan 12 – Jan 17 2004	University of Adelaide; Adelaide; South Australia	Bdale Garbee, Jon 'maddog' Hall, Havoc Pennington	2004
linux.conf.au 2005	Apr 18 – Apr 23 2005	Australian National University; Canberra; Australian Capital Territory	Andrew Tridgell, Andrew Morton, Eben Moglen	2005
linux.conf.au 2006	Jan 23 – Jan 28 2006	University of Otago; Dunedin; New Zealand	Mark Shuttleworth, Damian Conway, David Miller	2006
linux.conf.au 2007	Jan 15 – Jan 20 2007	University of New South Wales; Sydney; New South Wales	Kathy Sierra, Andrew S. Tanenbaum, Chris Blizzard	2007
linux.conf.au 2008	Jan 28 – Feb 2 2008	University of Melbourne (Victoria (state)) Melbourne; Victoria	Anthony Baxter, Bruce Schneier, Stormy Peters	2008
linux.conf.au 2009	Jan 19 – Jan 24 2009	University of Tasmania; Hobart; Tasmania	Tom Limoncelli, Angela Beesley, Simon Phipps	2009
linux.conf.au 2010	Jan 18 – Jan 23 2010	Wellington Convention Centre; Wellington; New Zealand	Benjamin Mako Hill, Gabriella Coleman, Nathan Torkington, Glyn Moody	2010
linux.conf.au 2011	Jan 24 – Jan 29 2011	Queensland University of Technology, Brisbane; Queensland	Mark Pesce, Eric Allman, Geoff Huston, Vinton Cerf	2011
linux.conf.au 2012	Jan 16 – Jan 21 2012	University of Ballarat, (Victoria (state)) Ballarat; Victoria	Karen Sandler, Bruce Perens, Paul Fenwick, Jacob Appelbaum	2012
linux.conf.au 2013	Jan 28 – Feb 2 2013	Australian National University; Canberra; Australian Capital Territory	Andrew Huang, Radia Perlman, Bdale Garbee, Tim Berners-Lee	2013
linux.conf.au 2014	Jan 6 – Jan 10 2014	University of Western Australia; Perth; Western Australia	Suelette Dreyfus, Kate Chapman, Matthew Garrett, Jonathan Oxer	2014
linux.conf.au 2015	Jan 12 – Jan 16 2015	University of Auckland; Auckland; New Zealand	Bob Young, Linus Torvalds, Eben Moglen	2015
linux.conf.au 2016	Feb 1 – Feb 5 2016	Deakin University (Victoria (state)) Geelong; Victoria	Genevieve Bell, Catarina Mota, Jono Bacon, George Fong	2016
linux.conf.au 2017	Jan 16 – Jan 20 2017	Wrest Point Convention Centre; Hobart; Tasmania	Robert M. "r0ml" Lefkowitz, Nadia Eghbal, Pia Waugh, Dan Callahan	2017
linux.conf.au 2018	Jan 22 – Jan 26 2018	University of Technology Sydney; Sydney; New South Wales	Karen Sandler, Jess Frazelle, Matthew H. Todd, Hugh Blemings	2018
linux.conf.au 2019	Jan 21 – Jan 25 2019	University of Canterbury; Christchurch; New Zealand	Rory Aronson CEO FarmBot, Dana Lewis OpenAPS, Shannon Morse, Rusty Russell	2019
linux.conf.au 2020	Jan 13 – Jan 17 2020	Gold Coast Convention and Exhibition Centre; Gold Coast; Queensland	Dr Sean Brady, Donna Benjamin, A/Prof Vanessa Teague, Lizzie O’Shea	2020
linux.conf.au 2021	Jan 23- Jan 25 2021	Virtual event	Limor Fried, Omoju Miller, Cory Doctorow	2021
linux.conf.au 2022	Jan 14 – Jan 16 2022	Virtual event	Liz Fong-Jones, Jono Bacon, Kathy Reid, Brian Kernighan	2022

Highlights from past conferences include:

- 1999: CALU (Conference of Australian Linux Users) was conceived, bankrolled (via his personal credit card) and executed by Linux kernel hacker Rusty Russell. It laid the foundation for a successful, strongly technical, eclectic and fun conference series.
- 2001: the first conference held under the linux.conf.au name.
- 2004: a major highlight was the dunking of Linus Torvalds for charity.
- 2006: the first conference to be held outside Australia, recognising the importance of the New Zealand Linux community.
- 2007: a new feature was an Open Day for non-conference attendees, in which community groups, interest groups and Linux businesses held stands and demonstrations.
- 2008: the second time the conference was held in Melbourne. 100 OLPC machines were distributed to random attendees to encourage development. The Speakers dinner was held at St Paul's Cathedral Chapter House, and the Penguin Dinner was held in conjunction with Melbourne's Night Market, playing on the title of Eric Raymond's book, The Cathedral and the Bazaar.
- 2009: during the Penguin Dinner, a substantial sum of money was raised for the Save Tasmanian Devils fund – and a pledge made to replace the Tux Logo with the conference mascot, Tuz, to help raise awareness.
- 2010: over $33,000 raised for Wellington Lifeflight Helicopter Ambulance service.
- 2011: the event was almost washed out by the floods that devastated southern Queensland.
- 2016: preparations almost derailed by a massive storm just before the conference opened.
- 2020: $24,342 raised and donated to Red Cross for Australian Bush-fire relief
- 2021: in May 2020 Linux Australia announced that the planned 2021 conference in Canberra was postponed until 2022 due to the COVID-19 pandemic and a lightweight virtual conference would be held in 2021 instead.

== Miniconfs ==
Since 2002, a key feature of the conference are the associated "miniconfs". These are half – 2 days streamed gatherings run before the main conference. They have their own programme, but are open for any conference attendee to participate in.

The first event to have a miniconf was in 2002, with the Debian Miniconf, organised by James Bromberger. This was based upon the idea that DebConf 1 in Bordeaux was a "mini-conf" of the French Libre Software Meeting. The concept grew in 2004, with the Open-Source in Government (ossig) miniconf, EducationaLinux, Debian Miniconf and GNOME.conf.au. In 2010 the Arduino Miniconf was introduced by Jonathan Oxer, the author of Practical Arduino.

Miniconfs have included those devoted to computer programming, education, security, multimedia, arduino and system administration.

== See also ==
- Open Source Developers' Conference
