= List of users' groups =

This is a list of notable computer users' groups categorized by interest.

== General ==
- Chaos Computer Club
- Computer Measurement Group (CMG)
- ComputerTown UK
- Homebrew Computer Club

== Hardware platforms ==
- Adamcon Coleco Adam user group
- Toronto PET Users Group (TPUG)
- SHARE user group for IBM mainframe computers
- COMMON for Power Systems (IBM i, AS/400, iSeries, System i, AIX and Linux) users in North America.
- DECUS Digital Equipment Computer Users' Society
- Macintosh User Group
  - DUsers, the first Macintosh users group, based at Drexel University

== Applications ==
- IIUG International Informix Users Group
- Oracle User Group
- ASUG Americas' SAP Users' Group

== Operating systems ==
- USENIX established in 1975 as Unix Users Group
- Linux user group (LUG)
  - Bangalore Linux User Group
  - Beijing GNU/Linux User Group
  - Linux Users' Group of Davis
  - ILUG-Delhi
  - Lanka Linux User Group
  - Linux Australia
  - Linux Users of Victoria
  - LinuxChix
  - NYLUG
  - Portland Linux/Unix Group
  - RLUG
  - SEUL

== Programming languages ==
- Z User Group

== Markup languages ==
- TeX Users Group
- Deutschsprachige Anwendervereinigung TeX
