= Free software in India =

The history of Free Software in India can be seen from three different perspectives - the growth of Free Software usage, the growth of Free Software communities, the adoption of Free Software policies by the governments. India was quite late to the free software scene with adoption and penetration growing towards the end of the 1990s with the formation of pockets of Free Software communities spread across the country. The communities were typically centered around educational institutions or free software supporting organizations.

Communities primarily revolved around support mailing lists. Some of the largest and earliest communities were those based out of Chennai, Delhi, Kochi, Mumbai, Pune, and Trivandrum. Free Software Foundation of India, was formed in 2001 to promote the use and development of free software in India.

Some of the state governments, notably Kerala and Tamil Nadu created policies on the use of Free Software in state level organizations and launched ambitions projects like IT@School, Elcot OpenSuse migration. The government of India rolled out a policy to adopt Open standards and promote open source and open technologies in 2015.

== Free software usage in India ==
Free Software was almost synonymous with Linux and associated software in the past. However, with the gaining popularity of Free Software applications like Firefox or operating systems like Android it has become quite difficult to quantify the user base for Free Software. If we look at the usage of Linux operating systems in desktop computers in India we can see that the market share has increased to 1.8% in July 2016. A report of similar data in 2011 had shown that India was one of the top 20 users of Linux desktops globally. According to the State of FOSS in India report, "India still lags behind the global landscape in building sustainable home-grown projects and needs a strategic plan to incubate and proliferate domestic FOSS innovations worldwide".

== Free software communities / mailing lists in India ==
List of Free Software Communities in India
Name	City	State	Founded
Bangalore Linux User Group	Bangalore	Karnataka	1998
Free Software Users Group, Thiruvananthapuram	Thiruvananthapuram	Kerala	2001
India Linux User Group Delhi	New Delhi	New Delhi	1998

== Government of India policy on Free software ==
In 2012, the government of India released 'National Information Technology Policy 2012', where one of the stated objectives was "to adopt Open standards and promote open source and open technologies". In continuation to this, the 'Policy on Adoption of Open Source Software for Government of India' was released in 2014. This policy states that

Government of India shall endeavour to adopt Open Source Software in all e-Governance systems implemented by various Government organizations, as a preferred option in comparison to Closed Source Software (CSS). The Open Source Software shall have the following characteristics:

3.1 The source code shall be available for the community / adopter / end user to study and modify the software and to redistribute copies of either the original or modified software.

3.2 Source code shall be free from any royalty.

Although the policy only talks about open source software and not free software per se, the conditions requiring that the source be available for modifications and redistributions align with the licensing requirements of Free and Open Source Software and thereby is expected to give a big boost to the adoption of free and open-source software in the government organizations in India. The state governments in the different states of India are expected to come up with their own versions of this policy around open source adoption for implementation at the state government levels. An analysis of Open Source promotion policies in India have shown deficiencies in implementation.

=== Government of Kerala policy on Free Software ===
In 2007, government of Kerala released its ICT policy where one of its objectives was to mandate appropriate use of Free Software in all ICT initiatives.

The Government realizes that Free Software presents a unique opportunity in building a truly egalitarian knowledge society. The Government will take all efforts to develop Free Software and Free Knowledge and shall encourage and mandate the appropriate use of Free Software in all ICT initiatives.

The state of Kerala has a rich history of free software activism which had resulted in several internationally visible free software initiatives as well as the IT policy that is biased towards free software.

== Notable Free Software Initiatives / Projects in India ==
=== KITE in Kerala ===
In 2001, the Government of Kerala launched an initiative called KITE (previously known as IT@School Project) which aimed at creating a Free Software-based IT training program for students in public schools. A custom Linux distribution called the KITE GNU/Linux (previously known as IT@School GNU/Linux) was rolled out across 12000 public schools in the state as part of this program.

=== Oruma Project in KSEB in Kerala ===
In 2008, the Kerala State Electricity Board moved their billing solution to the free software platform "Oruma" developed by its internal team with the support of the Free Software community in Kerala

=== BOSS Linux ===
Bharat Operating System Solutions (BOSS) is a Linux distribution developed by the National Resource Centre for Free/Open Source Software (NRCFOSS) of India.

=== FOSS Initiatives under MeitY ===
- "Major FOSS Initiatives | Government of India, Ministry of Electronics and Information Technology (MeitY)". meity.gov.in.

=== ELCOT in Tamil Nadu migrating to OpenSUSE ===
In 2007, ELCOT, migrated 30,000 systems in government establishments and schools in Tamil Nadu to OpenSUSE.

== See also ==
Free software in Kerala
