= Maya (operating system) =

Computer operating system based upon Ubuntu

Maya OS
- Developer: DRDO, C-DAC, NIC
- OS family: Unix-like
- Working state: Current
- Source model: Open source
- Released to manufacturing: 2021; 5 years ago
- General availability: 15-August-2023
- Marketing target: Government systems
- Package manager: dpkg (APT)
- Kernel type: Monolithic (Linux)
- Userland: GNU

Maya OS is an operating system developed by the Indian Defence Research and Development Organisation (DRDO) in 2021, with implementation commencing after 15-August-2023. It is based on the Ubuntu distribution of Linux. Included with Maya OS is "Chakravyuh", an endpoint detection and protection system designed to safeguard against security threats.

The stated goal of the project is to protect sensitive defence systems and data from cyberattacks, promoting indigenous innovation by the Indian Computer Emergency Response Team and reducing dependence on foreign software.

== Name ==
Maya OS derives its name from the Sanskrit word "Maya" (माया), meaning "illusion". The name reflects the system's capability to provide deceptive layers of security, effectively cloaking the Defence Ministry's computers from potential cyber threats.

Accompanying Maya OS is Chakravyuh, an endpoint detection and protection system, named after the Sanskrit term "Chakravyuha" (चक्रव्यूह). This term describes a strategic military formation used for encircling adversaries, as famously illustrated in the Hindu epic, the Mahabharata.

== Development ==
Predating Maya OS, in 2007, the Centre for Development of Advanced Computing (C-DAC) introduced the Bharat Operating System Solutions (BOSS GNU/Linux), a Linux distribution intended to foster the use of free and open-source software in India. This operating system was notably adopted by the Indian Army. However, BOSS GNU/Linux failed to achieve widespread success, primarily due to insufficient government backing and investment, leading to its gradual decline.

The development of Maya OS started in 2021 after India experienced several cyberattacks from foreign adversaries targeting its critical infrastructure and defense systems. It was developed by experts from different government agencies, including the Defence Research and Development Organisation (DRDO), the Centre for Development of Advanced Computing (C-DAC), and the National Informatics Centre (NIC), in about six months.

== Adoption ==
As of August 2023, Maya OS is reported to have been installed in the systems of India's Ministry of Defence. Plans were in place for the Indian Army, Navy, and Air Force to adopt the operating system by the end of that year.

The user interface of Maya OS has been designed to mimic that of Microsoft Windows, facilitating an easier transition for users accustomed to the Windows environment.

== See also ==
- Bharat Operating System Solutions
- Free software in India
- National Resource Centre for Free/Open Source Software
