= Free software in Kerala =

The state of Kerala, in India has had an active Free software community since early 1980s. The initial users were those who started using TeX in the city of Thiruvananthapuram. Subsequently Free software users groups were formed in some of the different cities like Thiruvananthapuram, Kochi and around engineering colleges in the state. The Free software community in Kerala was instrumental in creating a policy environment at the state government level that was biased towards Free software. The government of Kerala policy on Free software gives first preference to Free and Open Source software for its IT requirements. The state claims to be the only state in the world where IT education is imparted over a Free software operating system.

== Government Policy on Free software ==
The IT Policy for the state of Kerala had acknowledged the relevance of Free software as early as 2001

The 2001 IT policy states that,

The Government wishes to encourage the judicious use of open source/free software that complements/supplements proprietary software, to reduce the total cost of ownership of IT applications/solutions without compromising on the immediate and medium term value provided by the application. The Government welcomes research into the use of open/free software in the context of education, governance, and for general use at home, to make IT truly a part of the daily lives of the people of the State. The Government also encourages projects such as the Simputer that is low cost, based on open software, and attuned to the needs of the common man.

In 2007, government of Kerala released its ICT policy where one of its objectives was to mandate appropriate use of Free Software in all ICT initiatives.

The Government realizes that Free Software presents a unique opportunity in building a truly egalitarian knowledge society. The Government will take all efforts to develop Free Software and Free Knowledge and shall encourage and mandate the appropriate use of Free Software in all ICT initiatives.

== Free software communities / mailing lists ==
There are two prominent free software mailing lists and communities around these mailing lists in Kerala. One is around the Free Software Users Group, Thiruvananthapuram and the other is the Indian Libre User Group, Kochi. The primary activities of the users groups were around offering support to Free software users and in running technology and awareness sessions for the public and in institutions and running install fests. There are also active Free software clubs in several Engineering colleges in the state like College of Engineering, Trivandrum, St. Josephs College of Engineering and Technology, Pala, MES College of engineering Kuttippuram, National Institute of Technology, Kozhikode, L.B.S College of Engineering, Vidya Academy of Science and Technology, Thrissur, SCMS School of Engineering and Technology

== Free software initiatives in the state ==
Over the years several government entities in the state of Kerala switched / started significantly using Free software solutions in their operations. Some of the notable projects are listed below.

=== KITE ===
In 2006, the state government decided to impart ICT education in public schools across the state using a customized Debian distribution called KITE GNU/Linux (previously known as IT@School GNU/Linux). The KITE under Department of General Education, Government of Kerala implemented one of the largest deployments of GNU/Linux systems anywhere in the world. Earlier technical support and training for the project was provided by SPACE and is currently being provided by KITE

=== ORUMA billing software by Kerala State Electricity Board ===
In 2008, the Kerala State Electricity Board moved to a Free software platform called ORUMA to run their billing operations. The system was built with the help of an internal team at KSEB. Initial consultations and trainings were provided by SPACE.

=== Kerala Khadi & Village Industries Board Free software migration ===
The Kerala Khadi and Village Industries Board moved to a Free software platform built by Keltron.

=== Public Works Department ===
The Kerala Public Works Department moved to a Free software platform built by InApp Technologies

=== Kerala Legislative Assembly Free software migration ===
In 2014 the Kerala Legislative Assembly moved all of their IT operations into GNU/Linux based systems with the assistance of Zyxware Technologies.

== Organizations and not-for-profit agencies working in the Free software space ==
=== ICFOSS - International Center for Free and Open Source Software ===
ICFOSS is an autonomous agency set up by the Government of Kerala in 2011 with the mandate of popularizing Free and Open Source Software for universal use; consolidating the early FOSS work done in Kerala; and networking with different nations, communities and governments to collaboratively promote FOSS.

=== SPACE - Society for Promotion of Alternative Computing and Employment ===
SPACE is a not-for-profit society which has been working closely with the Government and several of the government departments and agencies in driving Free software adoption in them. SPACE has been involved in policy formulation, consultation, training and technical support for projects like IT@School, ORUMA, Khadi Board migration etc. The agency has also been running a center called INSIGHT which is actively pursuing taking Free software to the disabled.

=== SMC - Swathantra Malayalam Computing ===
SMC is a Free software collective which works in the space of Indic language computing. SMC is the upstream maintainers for Malayalam fonts and tools for popular GNU/Linux based operating systems such as Fedora and Debian. They also maintain localizations for Free Software Desktops (GNOME/KDE) and applications such as Firefox and Libre Office.

== Free software Conferences ==
=== Free Software Free Society Conference ===
Kerala hosts a regular international conference on Free Software which runs once every 2 – 4 years. This conference is done with the involvement of the Government of Kerala and the Free software community. International Center for Free and Open Source Software (ICFOSS) has been responsible for organizing the last two editions of the conference.

1. Freedom First 2001
2. Free Software Free Society 2005
3. FSFS 2008
4. FOSSK4 2011
5. Swatantra 2014
6. Swatantra 2017

=== FOSSMeet ===
The students of National Institute of Technology Calicut conducts an annual Free Software conference called FOSSMeet, which is held on the campus during the month of February/March every year. The 3 day conference has been held every year since 2005. After a gap of 3 years due to COVID-19, FOSSMeet was restarted offline in 2023.

1. FOSSMeet 2005
2. FOSSMeet 2019
3. FOSSMeet 2024

== See also ==
Free software in India

Free software movement
