= Satish Babu =

Indian Internet Governance Activist (born 1961)

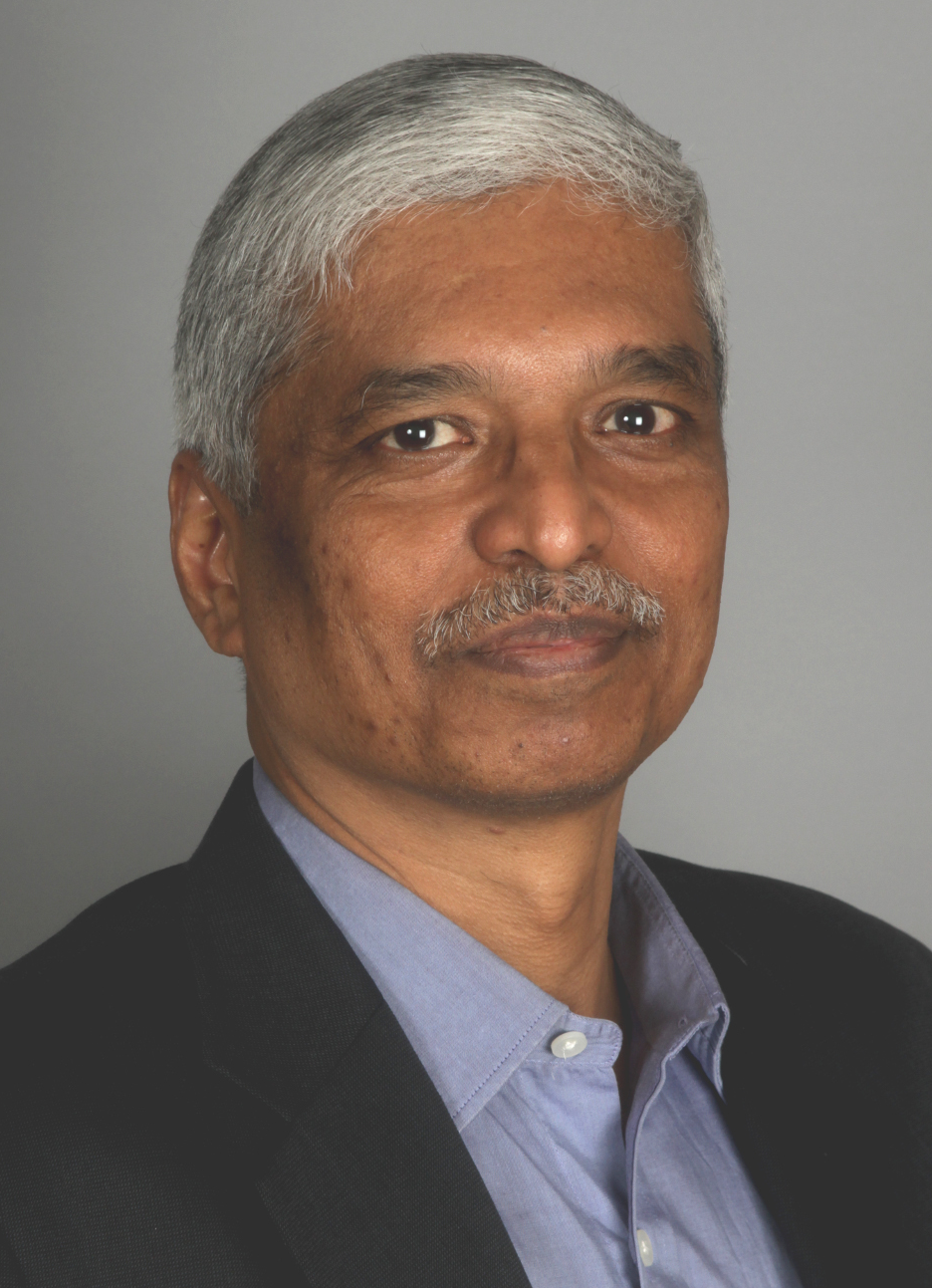
- Satish Babu (2015)
- Born: 5 April 1961 (age 65); India
- Occupation: ISOC/ICANN/IEEE/InApp/CSI
- Known for: Internet & FOSS Advocate

Satish Babu (Sathees Babu Chellikattuveli Sivanandan, born: 1961) is a Free Software activist, early Internet advocate, and development professional based out of Kerala, India. He is the founding Director of the International Centre for Free and Open Source Software (ICFOSS), an autonomous academic/research institution of the Government of Kerala, India, where he worked from March 2011 to September 2015. He was earlier the CEO of SIFFS, an NGO of small-scale artisanal fishers of south India; a co-founder and President of InApp Information Technologies; and is associated with international and national professional societies such as IEEE, Internet Society (ISOC), ICANN, and the Computer Society of India (CSI).

Satish has been active in Internet Governance since the 2009 IGF. He was a Fellow of the 2012 European Summer School in Internet Governance (EuroSSIG). He is associated with ICANN since 2012 and with ISOC as a member since 2009. He served as the Interim Chair of the Asian, Australasian and Pacific Islands Regional At-Large Organization (APRALO) of ICANN in Sep 2016, and further as elected Chair for three terms. In October 2021, ICANN announced that it was honouring Satish Babu with the Dr Tarek Kemal Capacity Building Award. In 2022, he was appointed to the 15-member At-Large Advisory Committee (ALAC) of ICANN. In 2025, Satish was appointed as a member of IEEE's newly-constituted Global Policy Caucus that oversees the harmonization of policy positions across the different units of IEEE.

== Career ==
After his post-graduation in 1984, Satish Babu joined the South Indian Federation of Fishermen Societies (SIFFS), an NGO working with small-scale artisanal fishers of South India, and a fledgling at that time. He worked there for 17 years, initially as Executive and later on as CEO. SIFFS, under his leadership was one of the earliest organizations to utilize computers, especially for its commercial activities such as boat building and Outboard Motor programmes. SIFFS was part of several international networks. As a part of one such network, ICSF, Satish organized the first-ever Internet training for fishers in Latin America at the Catholic University of Lima, Lima, Peru, in May 1997, a very early example of South-South knowledge transfer in ICTs.

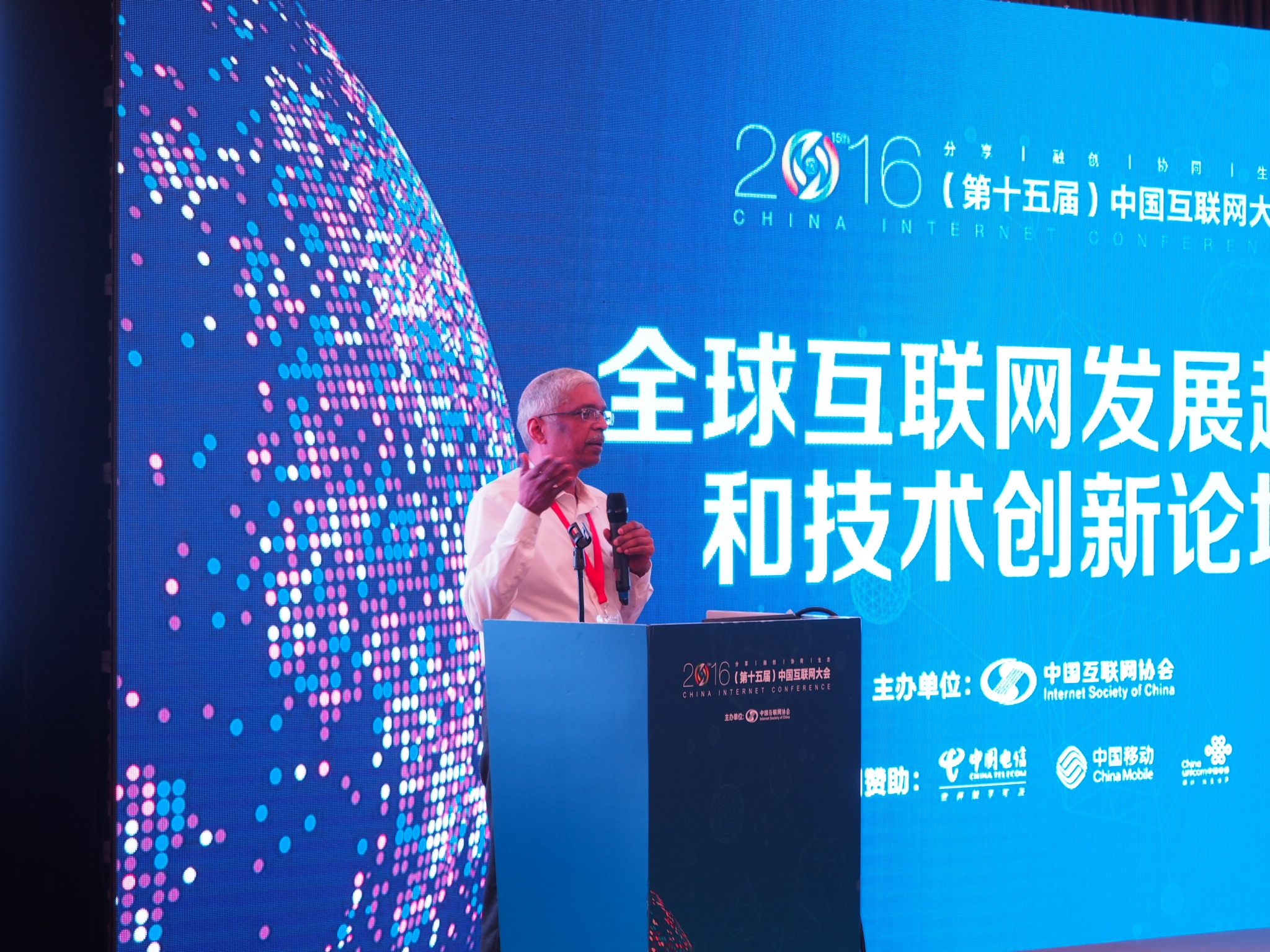
Satish Babu speaking at the China Internet Conference 2016 at Beijing.

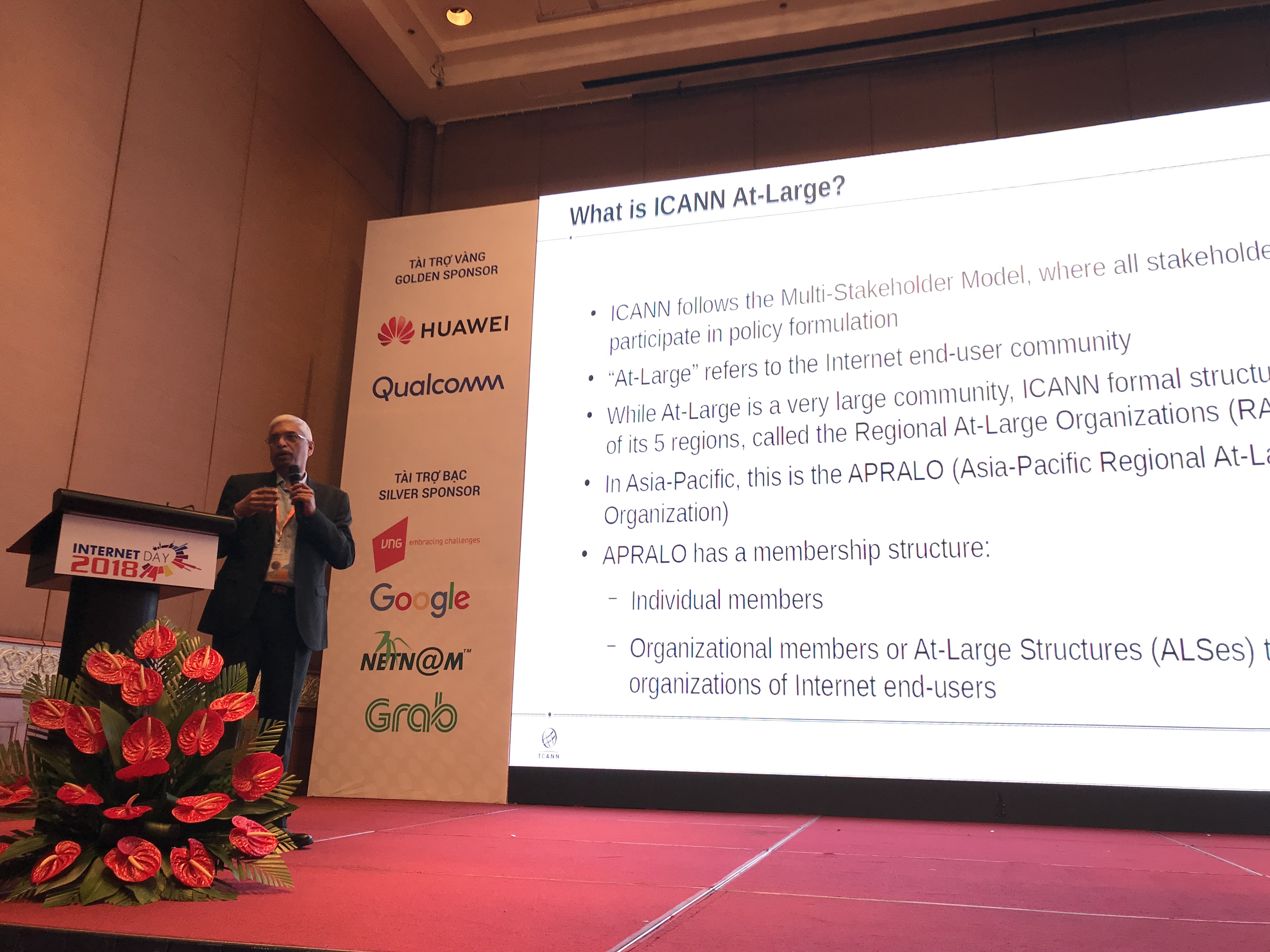
Satish Babu speaking at Vietnam Internet Day 2018 at Hanoi on 5 Dec 2018.

In 1999, he, jointly with three other colleagues, founded InApp Information Technologies, now an IT Services Company with offices in US, Japan and a development centre at Technopark, Trivandrum. He was on Sabbatical to ICFOSS as its founding Director during 2011–15.

=== FishNet and Internet Advocacy (1993–94) ===
Satish Babu was one of the earliest users and passionate advocates of the Internet from Kerala. He started using the Internet in 1993 at the Hull University, UK. He was a part of the IndiaLink program of the Indian Social Institute, Delhi, which attempted to connect NGOs through email on the Internet in the mid-1990s. In 1994, he set up and ran the Trivandrum node of the IndiaLink email network, called FishNet (fishnet.frlht.ernet.in), which is perhaps the earliest free, open, public email service in Kerala. FishNet used the Waffle/UUCP BBS software on an MS-DOS PC, and provided free email services to anyone equipped with an acoustic modem. The uplink to the Internet was to ERNET in Bangalore, through FRLHT, a Bangalore-based NGO. FishNet continued its services until the Internet was made available in Kerala through local dialup in 1996.

Public access to the Internet in India was provided by VSNL on 15 August 1995 for the first time. However, users from non-metros had to use expensive STD dial-up or the cumbersome X.25 to connect to these access points. In particular, Kerala had no local access points in 1995. He announced to the world in 1996 the arrival of public dial-up Internet in Kerala, through a post on the soc.culture.Indian.kerala Usenet board.

=== Free Software ===
Satish was the spokesperson and chief organizer of the 2001 "Freedom First!" Conference that introduced the concept and vision of Free Software in Kerala and India. Later, he was a co-founder of the Society for Promotion of Alternative Computing and Employment (SPACE) and its Executive Secretary during 2003–2010. As the founding Director of the International Centre for Free and Open Source Software (ICFOSS), he was involved in setting up and building the institution from 2011 through 2015. He has convened several conferences and workshops on Free Software, including FOSS workshops at the Internet Governance Forum.

=== ICANN ===
Satish Babu is a volunteer in ICANN. Besides contributing on several Working Groups of ICANN, he was elected to the 2014 and 2015 ICANN Nominating Committees representing the Asia-Pacific region. He was elected as the Vice Chair of ICANN's Asia, Australia and the Pacific Islands Regional At-Large Organization (APRALO) in 2014 and was re-elected in 2015. He co-chaired the ALAC Working Group on Internationalized Domain Name (IDN) Policy during 2014–2016.

=== Internet Society, Trivandrum (ISOC-TRV) ===
Satish is the founder-Chair of ISOC Trivandrum Chapter, which was set up in 2015. The ISOC chapter, under his leadership, has been actively participating in the Internet Governance debate, projecting the perspectives of end-users. ISOC Trivandrum organizes programmes around Internet-related themes such as Internet Governance, Core Internet Values and topical issues such as Net Neutrality, such as the consultation on Net Neutrality on 23 April 2015. Satish's position on Zero Rating versus Permissionless Innovation—a founding principle of the Internet according to Internet Society—was prominently covered in the media.

Satish was elected to the global Chapters Advisory Committee Steering Committee (ChAC-SC) of ISOC in 2017 and 2018. He was elected as Secretary of the Steering Committee in 2018 and 2019.

=== Schools on Internet Governance (inSIG and APSIG) ===
Satish has been a key organizer and supporter to Schools on Internet Governance (SIGs). He was a co-founder of the India School on Internet Governance, (31 Oct – 2 Nov 2016), the first edition of which was organized just prior to the ICANN57 Meeting at Hyderabad. The objective of inSIG was to "...to train professionals in the domain of Internet Governance, equipping them with the skills to enable them to participate effectively in global Internet Governance processes and institutions." A total of 44 participants successfully completed the program (including 15 international participants). Subsequent editions were organized in 2017 (Trivandrum), 2018 (New Delhi), 2019 (Kolkata) and 2020 (Virtual).

inSIG was supported by the Government of India (through NIXI), ICANN, Internet Society, IIIT-Hyderabad, APNIC, and the Asia-Pacific School of Internet Governance (APSIG), and was held at the International Institute of Information Technology (IIIT), Hyderabad, during 31 Oct 2016 – 2 Nov 2016.

It is also significant that inSIG reserved some seats for candidates from other countries in the region. Satish Babu has stated, "...although the primary objective of inSIG is to build capacity for Indian stakeholders, we also are committed to capacity building for the region. Initiatives such as inSIG, we believe, will encourage more participation from this region in global internet governance platforms such as ICANN, ISOC, and Internet Governance Forum."

Satish was a supporter and organizer of the Asia-Pacific School on Internet Governance, and was involved in creating its bylaws. In the first elections to APSIG held in June 2019, he was elected as the Chair of APSIG.

=== Internet Governance Forum (IGF) ===
Satish Babu has been a regular participant and workshop organizer at IGF, starting from the IGF 2009 at Sharm el-Sheikh. At the IGF, he has spoken on topics such as Free/Open Source Software; Digital Divide, Access & Connectivity Issues; Internet Governance; and the Blockchain, particularly for humanitarian and social uses.

=== Cryptocurrencies and the Blockchain ===
Satish has been an advocate of social uses of cryptocurrencies and the Blockchain, particularly for financial inclusion, grant transfers, identity management, traceability and governance. He started working with Bitcoin in March 2013, and is currently working with platforms such as Ethereum, Fabric, Sawtooth and IOTA. He has been a speaker on social applications of crypto in multiple forums including IGF 2017, IGF 2018 and schools on Internet Governance. He is in favor of a progressive cryptocurrency policy for India, one that would benefit end-users as well as the IT Developers and the industry. He has co-authored one of the earliest papers on Central bank digital currency (CBDCs) in the Indian context in June 2021.

=== Computer Society of India (CSI) and IEEE ===
Satish Babu was the President of the Computer Society of India (CSI), assuming office for a year from 1 April 2012. Prior to this, he was elected the Vice President and President-elect for 2011–12. He chaired the Special Interest Group on FOSS (SIG-FOSS) of CSI during 2008–15. In 2014, he was elevated as a Golden Jubilee Fellow of CSI.

Satish Babu was the President of the South-East Asia Regional Computer Confederation (SEARCC) during 2012, representing CSI. SEARCC is a regional grouping of national computer societies in Asia-Pacific, with seven full members (Australia, India, Malaysia, Pakistan, Papua New Guinea, Sri Lanka, Taiwan) and six observer states.

He was the Chair of IEEE Kerala Section during 2011 & 2012, and held several international positions in IEEE Computer Society, including Member, 2012 Nominations Committee and the R10 (Asia-Pacific) Co-ordinator of Geographic Operations. In 2014, he headed the Awards and Recognitions Committee (ARC) of the MGAB of IEEE Computer Society. He was declared as a Golden Core Member of IEEE Computer Society in 2011. In November 2013, Satish was awarded the IEEE MGA Achievement Award "...for continuous efforts in member engagement and development by promoting humanitarian technologies and fostering collaboration between the IEEE Computer Society and the Computer Society of India."

As the Chair of the first Chapter in the country, he was instrumental in bringing the IEEE Society on Social Implications of Technology (SSIT) to India. In 2016, he is leading the SSIT team in organizing its flagship conference, ISTAS 2016, in Trivandrum, India, in October 2016.

Satish served on the IEEE Humanitarian Activities Committee (HAC) for 2017 & 2018, and has been appointed for a third term in 2019. The HAC, set up to achieve IEEE's vision of "Advancing Technology for Humanity", oversees the funding and monitoring of technology-driven humanitarian and sustainable development projects.

=== Tsunami rehabilitation ===
Following the 2004 Indian Ocean tsunami, Satish Babu went back to SIFFS to work for three years in the rescue, relief, rehabilitation, and reconstruction phases of the Indian Ocean tsunami response in south India during 2005–2008. He is presently associated in an Advisory Capacity with BEDROC, Nagapattinam, and continues to be involved in the development and use of technology for Disaster Risk Reduction and Response.

== Education ==
Satish Babu studied at Sainik School, Kazhakuttam, Kerala, passing out of the All-India Higher Secondary Examination in 1977. He graduated in the four-year program in Dairy Technology from the National Dairy Research Institute (NDRI), Karnal, under Kurukshetra University (1982), and passed his Post-graduate studies at the Institute of Rural Management, Anand (IRMA), Gujarat, in 1984.
