= TRINet =

Trinet can mean:

- TRINet (India coast), formerly "Tsunami Rehab Information Network", also "The Resource and Information Network: for the coast"
- TriNet, a consultancy firm in San Leandro, California, USA
