= Atul Chitnis =

German-born Indian consulting technologist

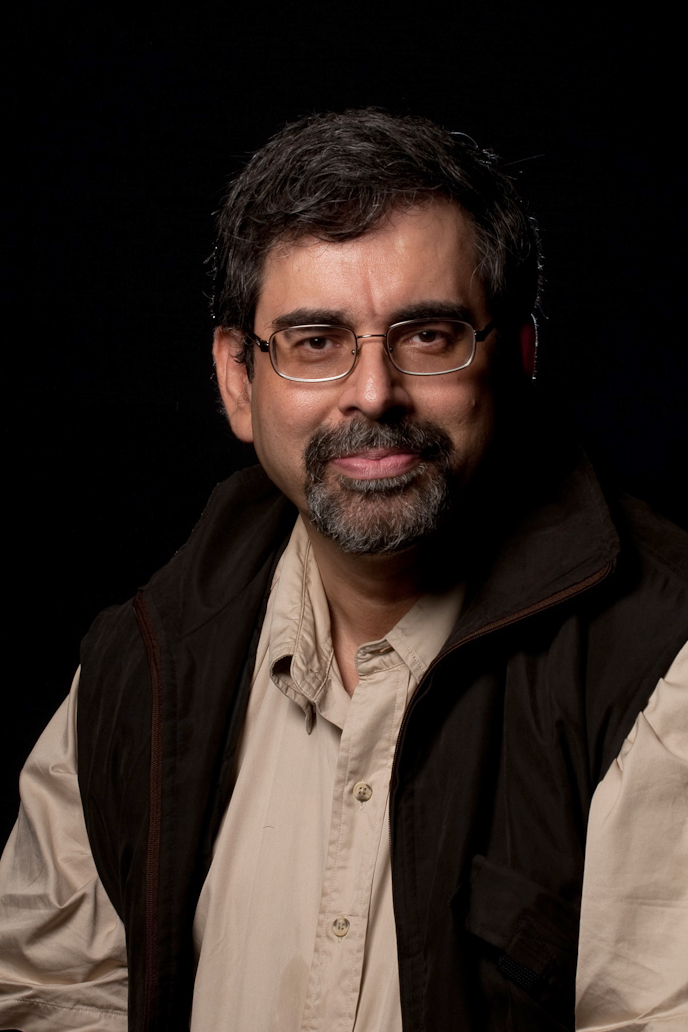
- Born: 20 February 1962; Berlin, Germany
- Died: 3 June 2013 (aged 51)
- Citizenship: Indian
- Occupations: Consulting, writer, Public Speaker
- Known for: FOSS.IN
- Spouse: Shubha
- Children: Geetanjali
- Website: atulchitnis.net

Atul Chitnis (20 February 1962 – 3 June 2013) was an Indo-German consulting technologist. He was one of the organizers of FOSS.IN (formerly Linux Bangalore), which was one of Asia's free and open source software (FOSS) conferences.

== Career ==
In 1989, Chitnis set up a Bulletin Board System (BBS) called CiX which provided an entry point for many users to online communities. He was the author of a PCQuest magazine column – COMversations. Chitnis gave talks on data communication in Indian industry, the Internet and intranets. As a Consulting Editor for PCQuest, he worked on the PCQuest Linux Initiative.

Working as a volunteer in the FOSS community such as the Bangalore Linux User Group, and through seminars and articles, he encouraged use of FOSS technologies. Chitnis was one of the organizers of the Linux Bangalore series of FOSS community driven conferences. FOSS.IN is said to have been one of Asia's largest annual FOSS events. Atul also served as one of the members of the faculty committee at the National Resource Centre For Free/Open-Source Software. He often spoke at various fora on FOSS technology and adoption.

== Death ==
Atul Chitnis was diagnosed with intestinal cancer in August 2012. He died on 3 June 2013.
