= HEUG =

Global nonprofit organization

The Higher Education User Group (HEUG) is a global nonprofit organization whose mission is “The Higher Education User Group is the leading global user community in higher education, collaborating to realize the maximum value from investment in people, business processes and technologies." HEUG represents over 900 campuses and over 30,000 individuals from 37 countries on 6 continents, making it the largest independent User Group in the world.

== History ==
HEUG traces its origins to the grassroots efforts of several dedicated individuals at the handful of higher education institutions that were the early adopters, beta partners, and charter institutions for PeopleSoft’s Financials, Human Resources, and Campus Solutions systems in the late 1990s. The organization was originally known as HESIG (Higher Education Special Interest Group) and held three conferences under that name in Dallas, Texas from 1998 to 2000. The HEUG was legally incorporated as a 501(c)(3) organization in 2001.
