= Free Software Users Group, Thiruvananthapuram =

The origins of the Free software community in Thiruvananthapuram can be traced back to the group of TeX users around the University of Kerala in early 1980s. The community then later named themselves Thiruvananthapuram LUG (Indian Linux Users Group), GNU/Linux Users Group, Thiruvananthapuram and then ultimately Free Software Users Group, Thiruvananthapuram. The community has worked with the government in helping with key Free software initiatives in the government and also in promoting and supporting Free software among the general public. The community has also been instrumental in creating an IT policy favorable to Free software in the state of Kerala.

== Main Activities ==
=== Free software install fests ===
One of the organized activities of the community was to organize GNU/Linux install fests in and around the city. These were usually organized in educational institutions or public places where the general public could bring their computers to get a GNU/Linux distribution installed on them. As GNU/Linux distributions became more and more easy to be installed and configured the community has stopped organizing these.

=== Developer camps ===
The group has also worked with SMC in organizing developer camps in Thiruvananthapuram and outside. During developer camps developers are given hands-on experience in working with Free software tools and primarily around localization initiatives which SMC is involved with.

=== Software / Hardware Freedom Day ===
The Free software community in Thiruvananthapuram has also been involved in organizing Software Freedom Day celebrations and Hardware Freedom Day celebrations in the city.

=== Free software release parties ===
The community has also organized release parties to celebrate the release of the different Free software like Ubuntu, Firefox etc.

== Key Initiatives ==
=== Free software install fest at Technopark ===
One of the first large-scale events organized by the community was a week long Free Software Install Fest at Technopark, Thiruvananthapuram organized in 2008. The event was co-organized by SPACE, Zyxware Technologies and Kerala State IT Mission

=== Creating India's first Freedom Toaster ===
The community worked together with Zyxware Technologies to create India's first Freedom Toaster which is a kiosk which can vend Free software CDs and DVDs. The Freedom toaster was made available at Technopark and at different engineering colleges to make available its services to the public.

=== Organizing Freedom Walk ===
The Free Software Users Group, Thiruvananthapuram along with Free software communities across Kerala and Zyxware Technologies organized a 44-day peace walk called Freedom Walk in 2008. Three volunteers from the community walked from Kasargod to Thiruvananthapuram covering all 14 districts in the state on foot and conducted Free software events in schools and colleges to promote the message and philosophy of Free software.

=== Organizing Free Software Free Society conferences ===
The community has been jointly involved with organizing of the Free Software Free Society conferences conducted by the government of Kerala through ICFOSS and SPACE.

== See also ==
1. Free software in Kerala
2. Free software in India
3. ICFOSS
4. SMC
5. SPACE
6. Free software movement
