= NCRC =

NCRC can stand for:

- NGO Coordination and Resource Centre, coordinating group of post-tsunami relief
- National Canine Research Council, an advocacy group for pit bulls and against BSL
- National Council for the Revolutionary Command, the 20-man council set up to rule Syria in 1963
- Nebraska Central Railroad
