= TRINet (India coast) =

TRINet (formerly Tsunami Rehab Information Network, India) has transitioned into "The Resource and Information Network: for the coast" from 1 April 2008.

== History ==
The 2004 tsunami in the Indian Ocean devastated large stretches of the coastal areas of India. Relief and rehab attracted a large number of players. Coordination as well as resource centres were set up in Tamil Nadu, the South Indian state most affected by the tsunami.

TRINet, the Tsunami Rehabilitation Information NETwork was set up in March 2005 as a response to the broad information requirements in the state of Tamil Nadu for tsunami rehabilitation and reconstruction phases to help in sharing information between different groups working on various aspects in the different districts of the state. It was initiated by three prominent organizations, viz., South Indian Federation of Fishermen Societies SIFFS, International Collective in Support of Fishworkers (ICSF) and the Bhoomika Trust.

TRINet has been collecting-collating-disseminating information related to tsunami rehabilitation. Apart from a website, TRINet produces weekly news bulletins - a collection of clippings from the media, a monthly Newsletter in English as well as a monthly Newsletter in Tamil. These can be downloaded from the site. TRINet also maintains a document database of reports and other publications related to the rehab process.

== Activities in tsunami rehab in India ==
In the three years of its existence as the Tsunami Rehab Information Network, TRINet organized a number of consultations and workshops on various topics related to tsunami rehab. Reports of these as well as presentations made at these meetings are available on the website. Topics of mention include on Coastal Protection Projects, Sanitation and Governance in fishing communities. Apart from the meetings organized by TRINet, a number of reports of tsunami-rehab-related meetings that did not find their way to the mainstream media can be found in the website.

Based on the experience of TRINet in the post tsunami period, a paper was presented at the Asia Pacific Conference of the Project Management Institute titled Project Management Needs in Disaster Situations: Lessons learned from the Boxing Day Tsunami.

== Current Focus ==
Three years after the Indian Ocean tsunami, TRINet's focus has changed from rehabilitation to long-term development of the coastal zone. Specifically, TRINet's focus will be on providing information on coastal issues from the perspective of the coastal communities whose livelihoods depend extensively on access to coastal resources.

TRINet compiled a dossier for the Campaign against CZM Notification in India in 2007.

TRINet continues to produce a monthly newsletter which is available to subscribers and can also be directly accessed from the website http://www.trinet.in under the blog entries.

TRINet's office is located at Nagapattinam, India as part of BEDROC.

== Dissemination Products ==
1. TRINet's Monthly Newsletter - each issue has a topical essay and a collection of snippets on coastal concerns as well as tsunami rehabilitation progress in India.
2. Weekly News Roundup was sent to a mailing list from August 2005-December 2008 and also made available on the TRINet website provides a collection of news items from the media related to tsunami rehabilitation and coastal issues.
3. "Alayathi", the Tamil newsletter

This and all the earlier newsletters and other dissemination products from TRINet can be accessed freely from the TRINet website.
