= FOSS.IN =

Free and open source software event in Bangalore, India

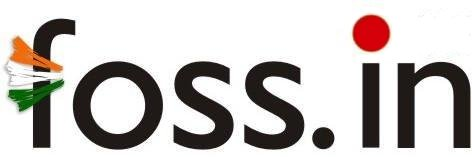
The FOSS.IN logo

FOSS.IN, previously known as Linux Bangalore, was an annual free and open source software (FOSS) conference, held in Bangalore, India from 2001 to 2012. From 2001 to 2004, it was known as Linux Bangalore, before it took on a new name and wider focus. During its lifetime, it was one of the largest FOSS events in Asia, with participants from around the world. It focused on the technical and software side of FOSS, encouraging development and contribution to FOSS projects from India. The event was held every year in late November or early December.

== History ==
=== Linux Bangalore ===
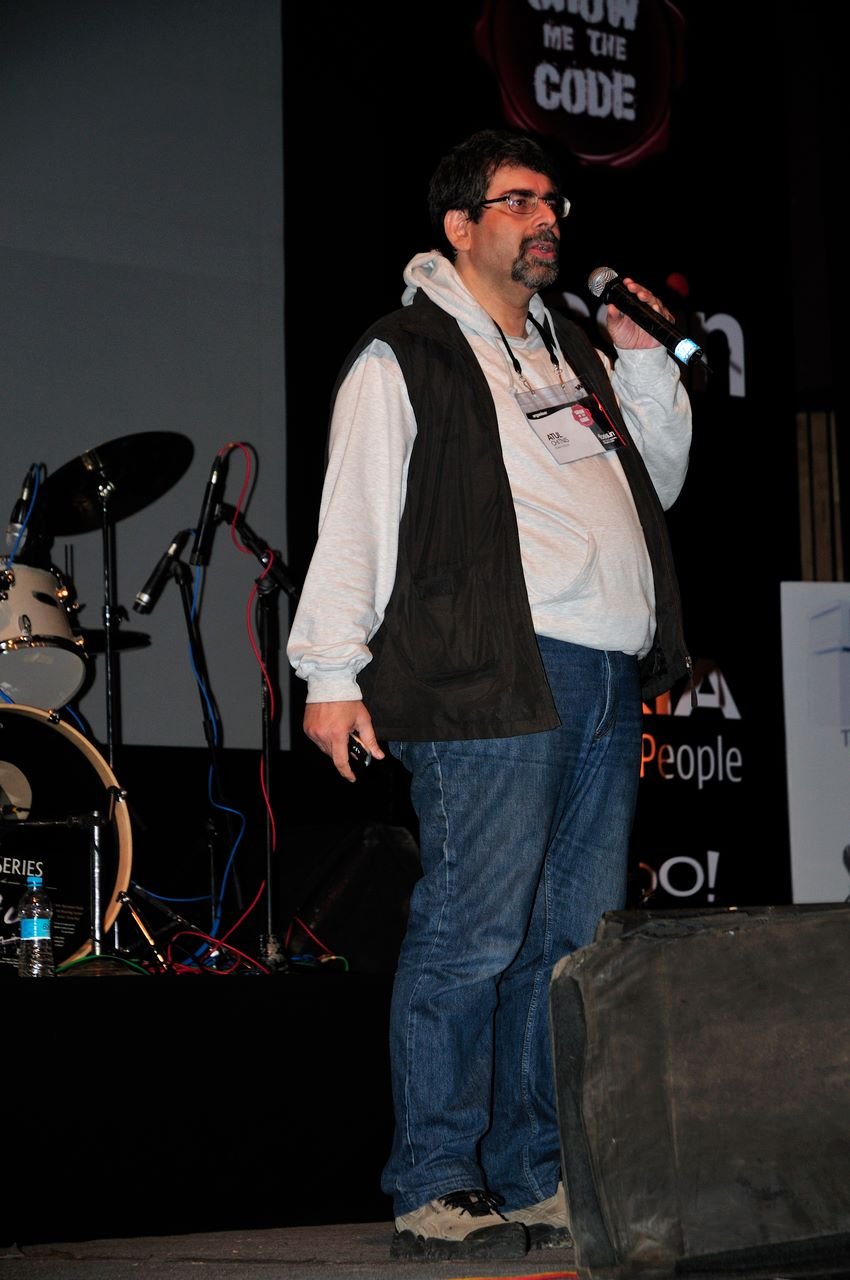
Atul Chitnis at FOSS.IN 2009

Linux Bangalore was India's premier Free and Open Source Software event, held annually in Bangalore. It featured talks, discussions, workshops, round-table meetings and demonstrations by Indian and international speakers, and covered a diverse spectrum of Linux and other FOSS technologies, including kernel programming, embedded systems, desktop environments, localization, databases, web applications, gaming, multimedia and community and user group development.

First held in 2001, the event saw the participation of thousands of delegates and replicated its success in 2002, 2003 and 2004. Linux Bangalore was a community-driven event, conceived, planned and built by the free and open source community of India, and Facilitation (business)|facilitated by the Bangalore Linux User Group. The event was very popular among software developers as reflected heavily by the demographics of participants.

At the conclusion of LB/2004, it was announced that name of the event would change and the scope would expand to cater to a wider range of topics. On August 12, 2005, it was announced that the name of the event would be changed to FOSS.IN.

=== FOSS.IN ===
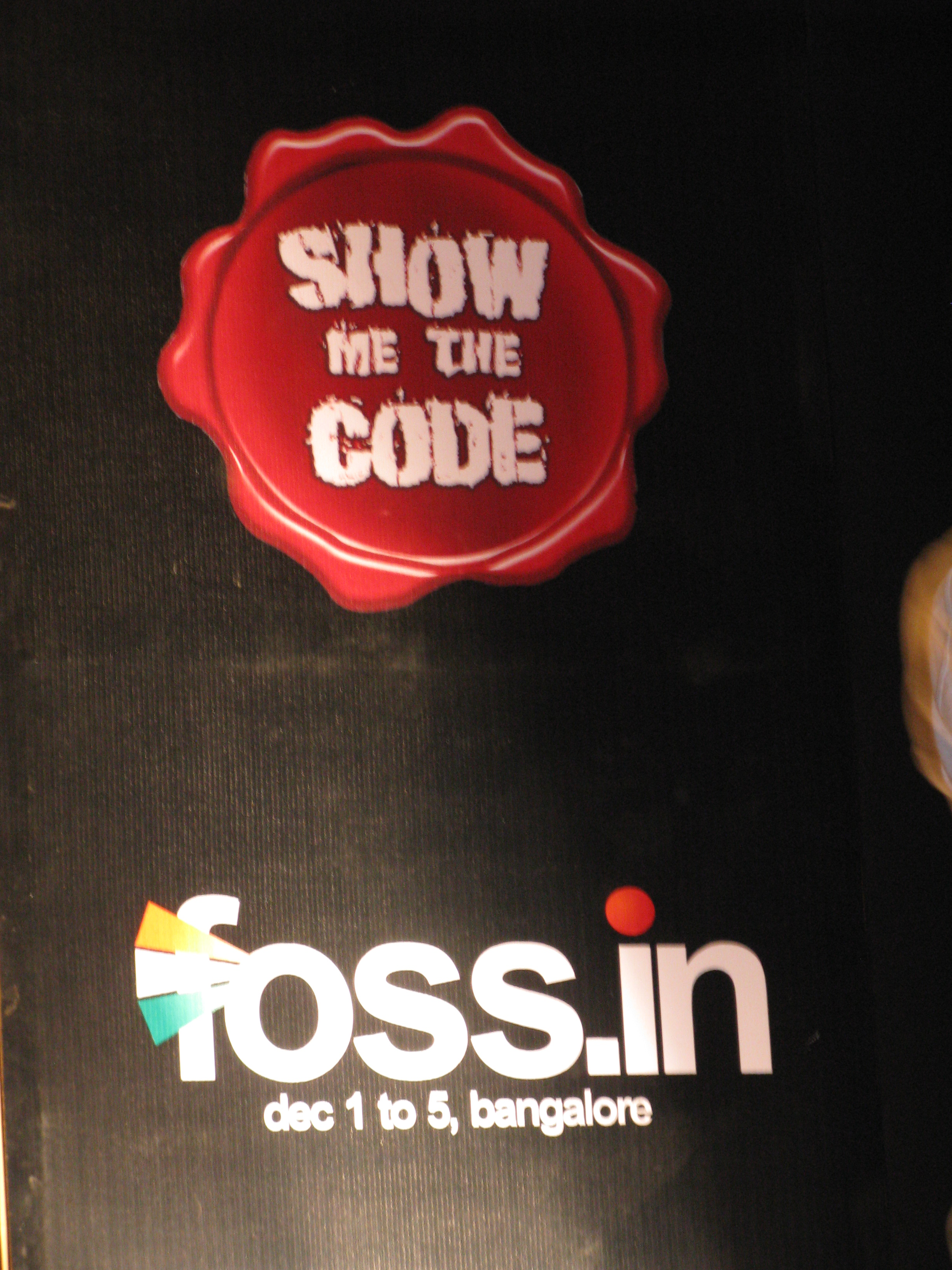

While the Linux Bangalore conferences focused around Linux, FOSS.IN broadened the scope to all free and open source software technologies. It was founded by Atul Chitnis.

=== FOSS.IN/2005 ===
FOSS.IN/2005 was held from November 29 to December 2, 2005, at the Bangalore Palace. It had 2751 participants, with more than 140 speakers presenting more than 180 talks, workshops, tutorials and BOFs. International speakers included Alan Cox, Harald Welte, Jonathan Corbet, Rasmus Lerdorf, Danese Cooper and Volker Grassmuck, among others.

=== FOSS.IN/2006 ===
FOSS.IN/2006 was held from November 24 to 26, 2006, at National Science Symposium Centre of the Indian Institute of Science in Bangalore, India. The sponsors included Ministry of Communications and Information Technology (Government of India), Sun Microsystems, Google, db4objects, Wipro, ABB India, CDAC among others. For the first time in the history of the event, the inaugural keynote address was delivered by an Indian developer, Suparna Bhattacharya of IBM. Other speakers included Rasmus Lerdorf, KDE developer Aaron Seigo, Russ Nelson, Andrew Cowie, Christof Wittig of db4objects, Harald Welte, German kernel expert Christoph Hellwig, Sulamita Garcia of LinuxChix, Frederick Noronha, Sunil Abraham of IOSN and Sirtaj Singh Kang.

=== 2007-2012 ===
From 2007 to 2010, the event continued to be held in late November or early December at various venues in Bangalore. 2010 was billed as the last FOSS.IN event, and there was no event in 2011; but it was returned for one more year in 2012, which organizers again stated was the last FOSS.IN.

== Role of the community ==
While the coordination of the event was handled by a core team led by Atul Chitnis, content (talks, workshops and tutorials) of the event were created by the FOSS community of India, as well as eminent international FOSS personalities. FOSS.IN was organized by the efforts of the linux-bangalore team.

== Funding ==
The event was funded through sponsorships from the industry and a registration fee charged to the delegates.

== See also ==
- List of free-software events
