= DUsers =

Drexel University Macintosh usergroup

DUsers is an Apple Macintosh users' group at Drexel University in Philadelphia. It was founded in the Fall of 1983 by Drexel students interested in learning more about the Macintosh, even before it was released to the public. Drexel University had made the decision to require that all incoming freshmen of Fall 1983 were required to buy a computer, and had selected Apple as the provider.

DUsers is widely acknowledged as the first Macintosh users group. The first president was Denise Walls, a Mechanical engineering major from Williamsport, Pennsylvania and the first vice president was computer engineering major Steve Weintraut of Cherry Hill, New Jersey.

A few years after the DUsers were formed, there was a large gala event held at Drexel to premiere the release of a documentary called "Going National", that chronicled Drexel's implementation of a Mac-centric campus. The event was attended by Steve Jobs, who was the founder of Apple computer. The original President, Denise Weintraut (Walls), and Vice President, Steve Weintraut, started dating that night and a few years later were married in June 1988. They have 3 children, Zachary Weintraut, Nicholas Weintraut, and Emily Weintraut.

The DUsers held 2 large Macintosh expos on campus, MacFair 85 and MacFair II (1987). Both of these events were very successful and raised a large amount of money for the group's activities.

Some of the other key founding members of the DUsers were Terrill L. Frantz, Seth Grenald, Charles Stack, Christine Axsmith, Debbie Pollack, Arthur Cohen, Scott Brown, Dave Dubin and J.C. Dubs

In the fall of 2004, DUsers was officially disbanded, with all its remaining assets turned over to TechServ, a club based primarily on performing community service through technology and supporting the open source software movement.
