= Swathanthra Malayalam Computing =

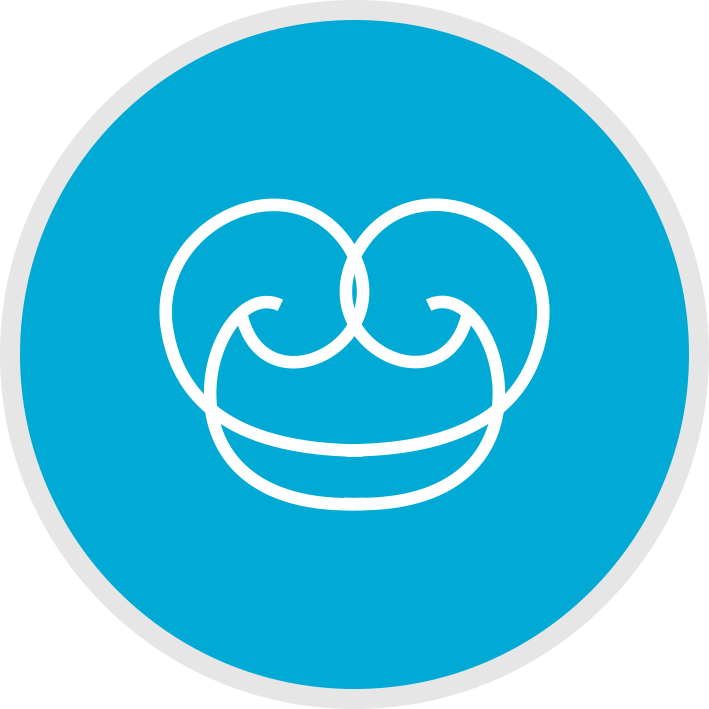
- Abbreviation: SMC
- Type: NGO for Indic computing
- Legal status: Society
- Headquarters: Thrissur, Kerala, India
- Location: Kerala
- Website: smc.org.in

Swathanthra Malayalam Computing (SMC) is a free software community and non profit charitable society working on Malayalam and other Indic languages. It is the biggest language computing developer community in India. This group has been involved in the Malayalam translation of GNOME, KDE, and Mozilla projects like Firefox. They developed Indic Keyboard which is a multi-language keyboard for Android. They have created several Malayalam fonts. The community also actively contributes towards Malayalam Wikipedia.

They supported Swatantra 2014 and were a part of Google Summer of Code in the years 2007, 2013, and 2014. Along with ICFOSS and The Frequently Used Entries for Localization (FUEL) Project, SMC was involved in creating a standard set of Malayalam words that developers can use while creating interfaces for mobile apps. Since August 2016, SMC community is an ICANN At-Large Structure.
