= BEDROC =

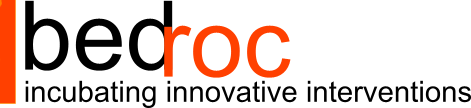
- Founded: 1 January 2007
- Type: Civil Society Organization
- Purpose: Response to Indian Ocean Tsunami
- Location: Nagapattinam, Tamil Nadu, India
- Origins: Conversion of NCRC, Nagapattinam
- CEO: Ms. Annie George
- Website: bedroc.in

Building and Enabling Disaster Resilience of Coastal Communities (BEDROC) is a Civil Society Organization (CSO) set up in order to continue the project-based post-tsunami development interventions initiated by the NGO Co-ordination and Resource Centre (NCRC), Nagapattinam, Tamil Nadu, India.

== Origins ==
NCRC was an important part of the 2004 Indian Ocean tsunami response in southern India. Nagapattinam District was the worst-affected District in peninsular India, with over 6,000 confirmed deaths. NCRC, which started off on 1 Jan 2005 as the NGO Co-ordination Centre, transformed to a joint, time-bound intervention of South Indian Federation of Fishermen Societies (SIFFS) and Social Need Education and Human Awareness (SNEHA), and supported by the United Nations Development Programme (UNDP).

== Genesis ==
After the original mandate of NCRC of 3 years, the Steering Committee of NCRC decided to transform NCRC into a more permanent development organization that would take on several of the long-term development interventions started off by it, while retaining the team of volunteers of NCRC.

Thus, Building and Enabling Disaster Resilience of Coastal Communities (BEDROC) was registered in 2008. BEDROC has continued to work closely with the District Administration; local, State and National Governments; and UN and multilateral agencies.

== TRINet ==
The Resource and Information Network for the Coast (TRINet), was originally set up as the "Tsunami Rehab Information Network" to serve as a platform for information exchange with NCRC being its most important partner. The initial initiatives in disseminating tsunami-related information were later expanded to cover ecological and development issues related to coastal communities. TRINet was integrated into BEDROC as one of its activities, so as to provide TRINet with continuity.

== Team ==
BEDROC continued on with the original NCRC staff team after its incorporation. The Chief Executive of BEDROC is Ms. Annie George, a seasoned professional who has been involved in the tsunami response at Nagapattinam from Jan 2005. BEDROC presently has a team of 23 staff.

Besides executing the regular activities of BEDROC, the team (including TRINet resources) have been contributing to the disaster-development-discourse through numerous seminars, workshops and conferences (See The Envis Workshop Report, and the Oxfam-BEDROC Report on "Building Local Capacities for Disaster Response and Risk Reduction").

== Activities ==
In addition to continuing ongoing initiatives set up during the tsunami response period—such as rehab, housing, child rights, water management and information dissemination—BEDROC has also initiated several new activities as a part of its vision of "Incubating Innovative Interventions". The new initiatives include livelihood interventions such as agriculture and dairying. These themes are part of BEDROC's ongoing focus on enhancing Disaster Resilience of coastal communities.

Innovations in tsunami rehabilitations in Nagapattinam also include ICT-based interventions, some of which have attracted attention from global technology organizations such as the IEEE.

As global warming and climate change join a host of other threats that communities face, the level of vulnerabilities faced by coastal communities of Nagapattinam in the delta of the Cauvery river system are set to increase further. BEDROC, with its experience in post-tsunami rescue, recovery, rehab and reconstruction, as well as the development interventions taken up under its stewardship, is poised to provide alternative models to other civil society organizations in the region and the rest of the world.
