= Anna University K B Chandrasekhar Research Centre =

Indian research center

Coordinates: 12.948021°N 80.140999°E

Anna University - K. B. Chandrasekhar Research Centre
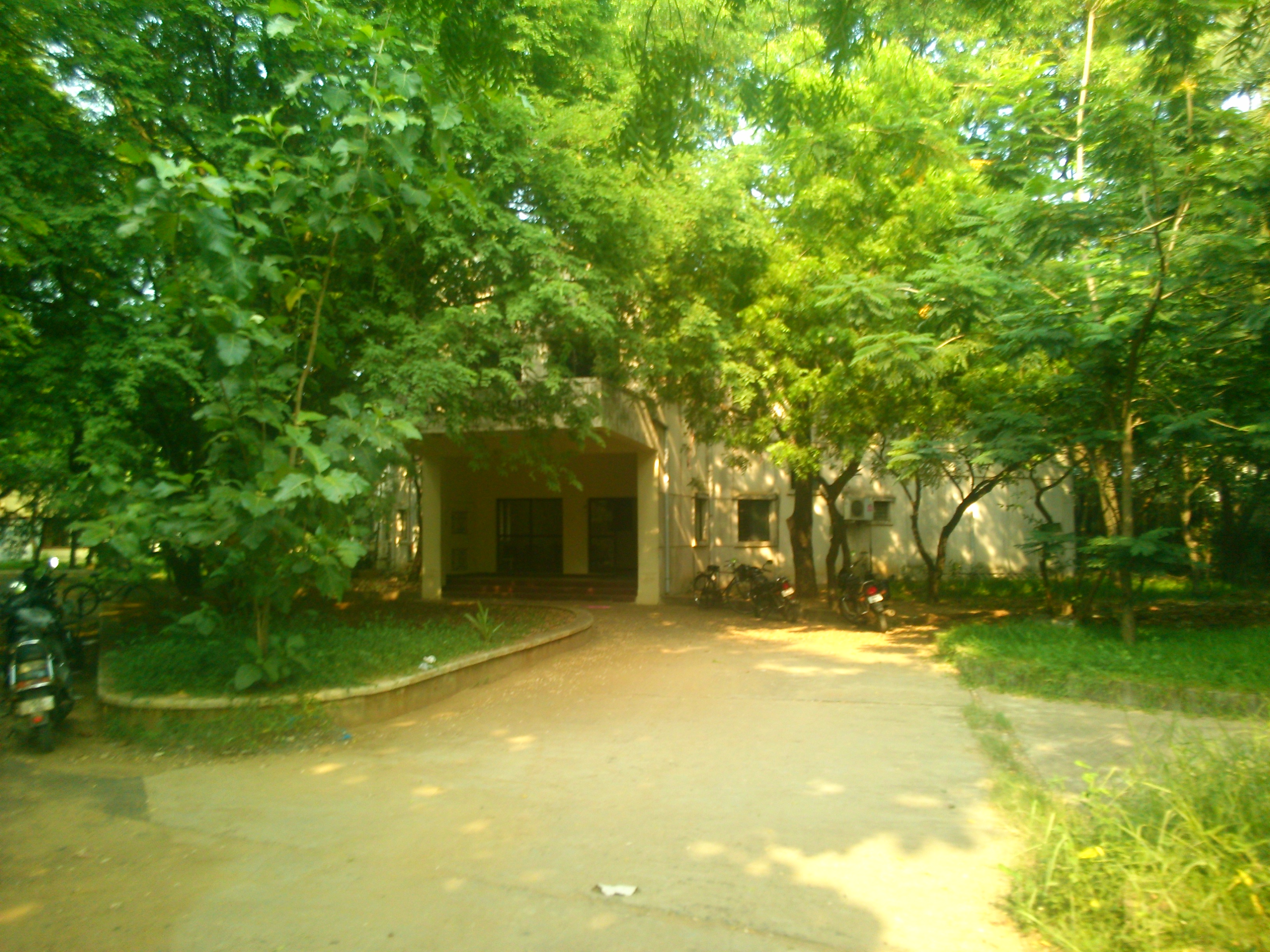
- Abbreviation: AU-KBC Research Centre
- Formation: 1999
- Type: Public Private Partnership
- Headquarters: Chennai, India
- Location: Madras Institute of Technology, Chromepet
- Director: Dr. Gautam Pennathur
- Parent organization: Anna University
- Website: au-kbc.org

The Anna University–K. B. Chandrasekhar Research Centre (AU–KBC) is located in the Madras Institute of Technology (MIT) campus. The centre was founded by K.B. Chandrasekhar, an MIT alumnus and the co-founder of Great Lakes Institute of Management, Chennai. The AU–KBC Research Centre is a public–private research centre in India, formed through the partnership between a wholly for-profit company (KBC Research Foundation Private Limited, KBCRF) and a state institution (Anna University). The centre's original goal, when it had its own employees, was to foster research and create products of international quality. Its current goal is to create revenue for KBCRF and its sister for-profit concerns.

== Mission and goals ==
The AU–KBC Research Centre initiates research in new and emerging thrust areas including nanosciences and conducts research in areas including communications and biology. There is an interdisciplinary core of mathematics, physics and computing sciences that impact on all the teaching and research work at the centre.

== Areas of focus ==
The major areas on which the centre focuses are information sciences, life sciences, mathematics, physics, bioinformatics, nanobiology, cryptography, network security, communications engineering and natural language processing.

The centre also supports clinical research. The centre offers a course namely "Post Graduate Certificate Program in Clinical Trials Management". The clinical trials course at the centre offers its trainees a headstart with multinationals who wish to use these unprecedented opportunities for drug trials (Phase II) in India. It is offered both full-time and part-time and is a first such course offered by a public-private institution.

== Achievements ==
The centre has conducted research in diverse fields and research papers have been published in major journals and conferences. The centre has acquired its first patent in communications engineering. The Government of India has funded the centre to extend the opensource activities to the regular academics and to contribute to the Free and Open-source Software (FOSS) mission. To coordinate these activities, the centre in collaboration with the Chennai Division of the Centre for Development of Advanced Computing (C-DAC) has set up the National Resource Centre for Free/Open Source Software.

== Educational opportunities ==
The M.S. (By research) and Ph.D. programmes of the Anna University in Information Sciences and Life Sciences are offered at the AU–KBC Research Centre as per the rules and regulations of Anna University.
