= Hindi blogosphere =

Online community of Hindi-language weblogs

== History ==
The first recorded Hindi blog, नौ दौ ग्यारह (Nine Two Eleven), was established by Alok Kumar, who coined the term Chittha (Hindi: चिट्ठा) to describe the medium. The term was subsequently adopted by the community and became the standard Hindi designation for a blog. Initially, blog use was limited due to the difficulties involved in typing Hindi script. However, as the availability of Hindi typing tools became more widely available, the number of Hindi bloggers began to increase.

Since 2007, the number of Hindi blogs has rapidly increased. This was due to the advent of Indic Unicode support in various blogging services, the introduction of new Hindi typing tools such as the Google Indic Transliteration tool in Blogger, and the promotion of Hindi blogging by mainstream media.

== Women in Hindi blogging ==
By April 2013, the Hindi blogosphere comprised over 50,000 blogs, with approximately 25% (12,500) authored by women bloggers.

== Types of blogs ==
In the early stages, most Hindi blogs were personal in nature, with only a limited number focused on specific topics and interests. By 2007, blogs began covering other topics such as cinema, technology, science, hobbies, and photography. In 2010, The Wall Street Journal started a Hindi blog called India Real Time, which later ended in 2017. It covered news, sports, Bollywood, politics, and business.

== Blog literary award ==
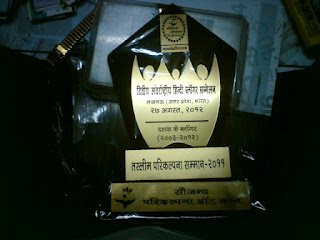
The Parikalpana Award memento

The Parikalpana Award is a literary award for blogs in India. It is presented by the magazine Parikalpana Samay and the company Parikalpana.

== Events ==
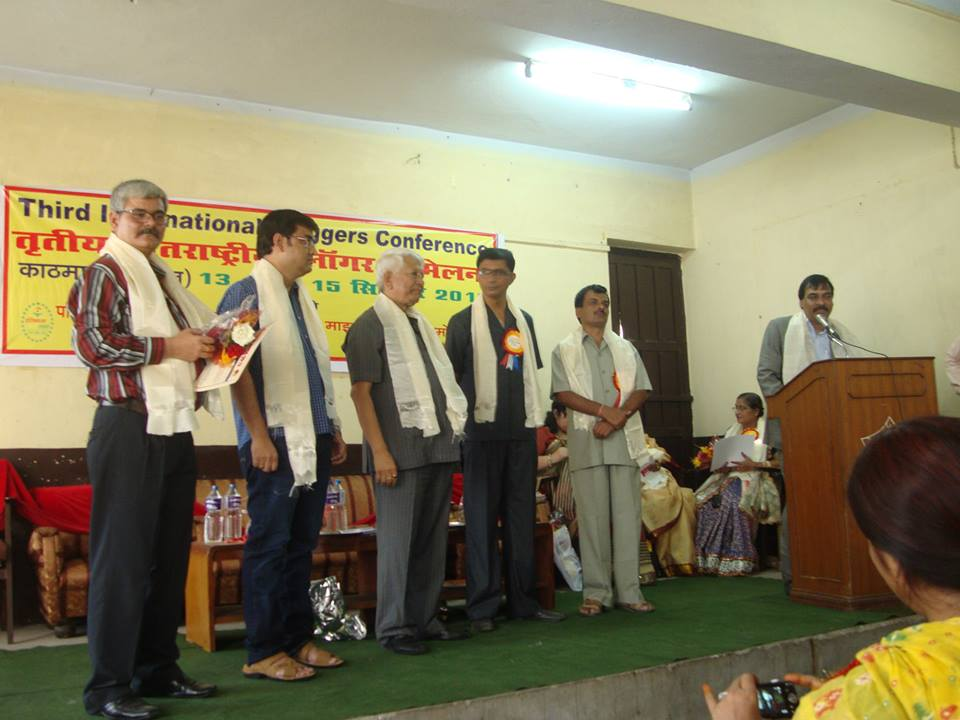
Ravindra Prabhat addressing the Third International Bloggers Conference in Kathmandu, 13 September 2013. With senior Nepali Congress leader Arjun Narasingha K.C., Kumud Adhikari, Vikram Mani Tripathi, KK Yadav and Rajiv Shankar Mishra.

- The First International Hindi Blogger Conference was inaugurated by the Chief Minister of Uttarakhand, Ramesh Pokhariyal Nishank in New Delhi on 30 April 2011. The celebration session was chaired by Ashok Chakradhar, Dr. Ramdarash Mishra, Prabhakar Shrotriy, Ravindra Prabhat and Vishwa Bandhu Gupta.
- The second Hindi Bloggers Conference was inaugurated by the Senior Indian Journalist Mudrarakshas in Lucknow on 27 August 2012. The celebration session was chaired by Shailendra Sagar, Birendra Yadav, Udbhrant, Rakesh Veda, Sudhakar Adeeb, Ravindra Prabhat and Dr. Subhaash Ray.
- The third International Bloggers Conference was inaugurated by the Senior leader of Nepali Congress Party and ex-cabinet minister of Nepal, Mr. Arjun Narasingha K.C. in Kathmandu, Nepal. It started on 13 September 2013 and concluded on 15 September 2013. Parallel online contributions were made by other participants. This three-day celebration session was chaired by Nepali, Hindi, Bhojpuri, Awadhi, Maithili, Chhattisgarhi writers and folklore scholars. The list of chairs included Mr. Kumud Adhikari, Suman Pokhrel, Uma Suvedi, Sanat Regmi, Vikram Mani Tripathi, Ravindra Prabhat, Dr. Rama Dwivedi, Dr. Sampatdevi Muraraka, K.K. Yadav, Akanksha Yadav, Girish Pankaj, Lalit Sharma, B.S. Pawala, Dr. Ram Bahadur Mishra, Shailesh Bharatvasi, Mukesh Kumar Sinha, Mukesh Tiwari, Manoj Bhavuk, Saroj Suman, Vinay Prajapati, Sunita Prem Yadav, and others.
- The fourth International Bloggers Conference was inaugurated by the Secretary General of the Bhutan Chamber of Commerce and Industry, Fub Shring, in Thimphu, Bhutan. It started on 16 January 2015 and concluded on 18 January 2015. This three-day celebration session was chaired by the Deputy Secretary General of the Bhutan Chamber of Commerce and Industry; Chandra Kshetri, Chairperson of the Women's Wing of the SAARC Committee and the International School of Bhutan; Thinley Lham, Chairman of the Linguistics Department at Assam University in Silchar; Professor Nityanand Pandey, Director of Indian Postal Services, Allahabad region; Krishna Kumar Yadav; and Senior Hindi Satirist Girish Pankaj.
- The fifth International Bloggers Conference was inaugurated by Sri Lankan dramatist Somrathne Withana and Ex-Cabinet Minister of Uttar Pradesh Nakul Dubey. It took place in Colombo and Kandy. It lasted from the 23rd to the 27th of May 2015. It was chaired by Krishna Kumar Yadav, the Director of Postal Service in Jodhpur; Sunil Kulkarni, Head of the Hindi Department at North Maharashtra University, Jalgaon; and Ravindra Prabhat.

== See also ==
- Blogosphere
- Indic computing
