= ILUG-Delhi =

ILUG-Delhi is a Linux user group, and is the Delhi Chapter of the India Linux User Group community (ILUG).

ILUG-D regularly organises meetings to discuss Free and Open Source Software. Meetings were usually organised once a month and announced on the linux-delhi mailing-list.

Linux-Delhi has also conducted events such as the Linux Demo Day for popularisation of FOSS.

In 2005 and 2006, ILUGD organized the event "FreeDel" to popularize FOSS tools and philosophy. The first of these events took place on the 17th and 18 September 2005. In 2007 the event was renamed to "Freed.in"; it was held until 2009.

In the summer of 2006, a bio-informatics workshop was run in collaboration with JNU Bio Informatics Centre, to develop FOSS solutions in Bio-Informatics field and to nurture talent in FOSS tools and languages.

These days, most of the discussion occurs in the Telegram group and the community there is very active.

During the COVID pandemic that has been spanning till now, the weekly check-ins meetups (every Friday) are held online at the Jitsi Meet platform, these meetups are itself discussed in the telegram group.

First post-COVID meetup was held in May 2022 which was restricted to limited members. But, online weekly check-ins still happen every Friday.

== See also ==
- Bangalore Linux User Group
- ILUG-Cochin
- Bharat Operating System Solutions
- Free Software Users Group, Thiruvananthapuram
