= Freedom Toaster =

A Freedom Toaster is a public kiosk that will burn copies of free software onto user-provided CDs and DVDs.

== History ==
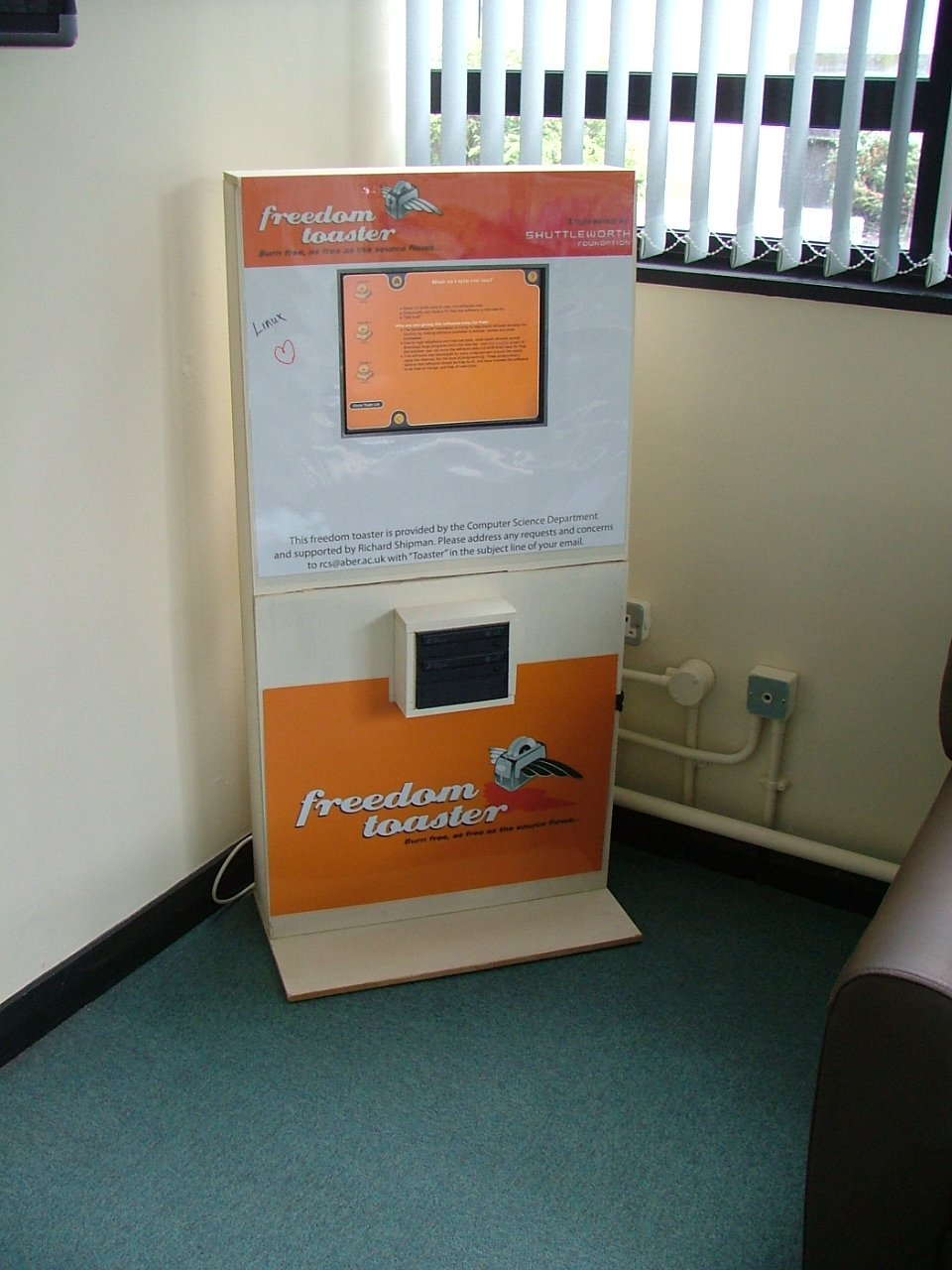
Freedom Toaster in Aberystwyth

The original Freedom Toaster project was sponsored by Mark Shuttleworth's Shuttleworth Foundation and built in Perl by Hamish Whittal. It consisted of a number of CD burning facilities (in kiosk form), where members of the public were able to burn copies of free and open-source software onto self-supplied blank CD media.

The project was started as one solution to overcome the difficulty of obtaining Linux and other free and open-source software in South Africa, where the restrictive telecommunications environment makes downloading large software files prohibitively expensive.

There are currently Freedom Toasters at the following locations: Bloemfontein, Cape Town (2), Diepkloof, Durban, East London, Grahamstown, Johannesburg (5), Knysna, Namibia, Pietermaritzburg, Port Elizabeth, Port Shepstone, Potchefstroom, Pretoria (3), Seneca College in Toronto, Stellenbosch, Stockholm, Trivandrum.

== Functions ==
A Freedom Toaster kiosk is placed at a school, library, shopping center or another publicly accessible location. Users bring blank optical discs to the kiosk and select the software that they would like. The kiosk will then burn the selected software onto the users' media.

The name derives from this function. "Freedom" refers to the free and open source software provided. "Toaster" is a term for an optical disc burner.

== Purpose ==
Freedom Toaster kiosks provide a way for computer users in economically disadvantaged regions and areas with limited or no Internet access to get software. By providing this service, the people behind the Freedom Toaster hope to address the issue of the Digital Divide.

== Availability ==
The Freedom Toaster is mostly available in South Africa and is currently supported by the Shuttleworth Foundation. The Foundation is attempting to get others to adopt the idea by providing the tools to help create, support and maintain your own Freedom Toaster. It has also provided seed funding to Brett Simpson of Breadbin Interactive to create a sustainable business model with the idea.

The initiative has also been taken up independently by a company in India - Zyxware Technologies - who has partnered with Free Software Users Group, Thiruvananthapuram to promote Freedom Toasters as a viable method to spread Free Software in India.
