= Association of Personal Computer User Groups =

International computing association

The Association of Personal Computer User Groups (APCUG) is an international, cross-platform association. It is a valuable resource for technology and computer user groups, helping them stay connected, informed, and effective in their mission to support and educate their members.

The association offers various services to member groups, including three monthly Wednesday Workshops and quarterly Saturday Safaris. These workshops provide presentations on various topics to enhance group members’ knowledge and expertise in multiple technology areas. In addition, the videos are available on YouTube for member groups to use at monthly or Special Interest Group (SIG) meetings.

Other member group benefits include the popular Speakers Bureau; member groups may request an interactive presentation for their meeting from over 100 topics. Member group editors receive articles they can use in group newsletters (PUSH). The articles are written by group members, sponsors, etc. APCUG has also received permission from many online authors to use their articles in group newsletters. Groups occasionally receive information regarding discounts or special offers to share with members.

APCUG was founded in 1986 and is dedicated to helping its member groups succeed by providing them with resources and support for their members. It is a 501(c)(3) non-profit organization.

== History ==
APCUG began after a series of meetings and discussions between representatives from various user groups around the country about improving communications between groups and sharing information. The presidents from three user groups—Boston Computer Society, Capital PC User Group, and Houston Area League of PC Users—organized the First Annual User Group Summit meeting at the 1986 Fall Comdex.

After that first Summit meeting and subsequent meetings, the leaders of 15 user groups met in Seattle in October 1987 and proposed the formation of an association for the purpose of fostering communication among and between user groups. That proposal was presented before 130 representatives from 50 user groups at the Second Annual User Group Summit Meeting in November 1987 and was unanimously approved.

== Products and services ==
APCUG offers many benefits to its member groups, including:

- Speakers Bureau featuring over 100 interactive presentations in 20+ categories that are given to groups online
- Monthly Wednesday Workshops (2nd, 3rd, and 4th Wednesdays)
- Quarterly Saturday Safaris
- Wednesday Workshop and Saturday Safari videos that can be used for group presentations
- PUSH tech articles sent to editors to use in their newsletters
- Quarterly Reports newsletter with region reports that let member groups know what other groups are doing, ideas for running member groups, etc.

APCUG2.org contains information about:

- APCUG
  - Board of Directors
  - Board of Advisors
  - History
  - FAQs
  - Committees
  - Contact Us
- Windows, Apple, Linux, and Chromebook tips
- Member Benefits
- How to find a speaker/presentation
- Member Group News
- Vendor News
- Discounts and Special Offers
- Contests
- Membership / Renewal
