= Users' group =

Club focused on the use of a particular technology

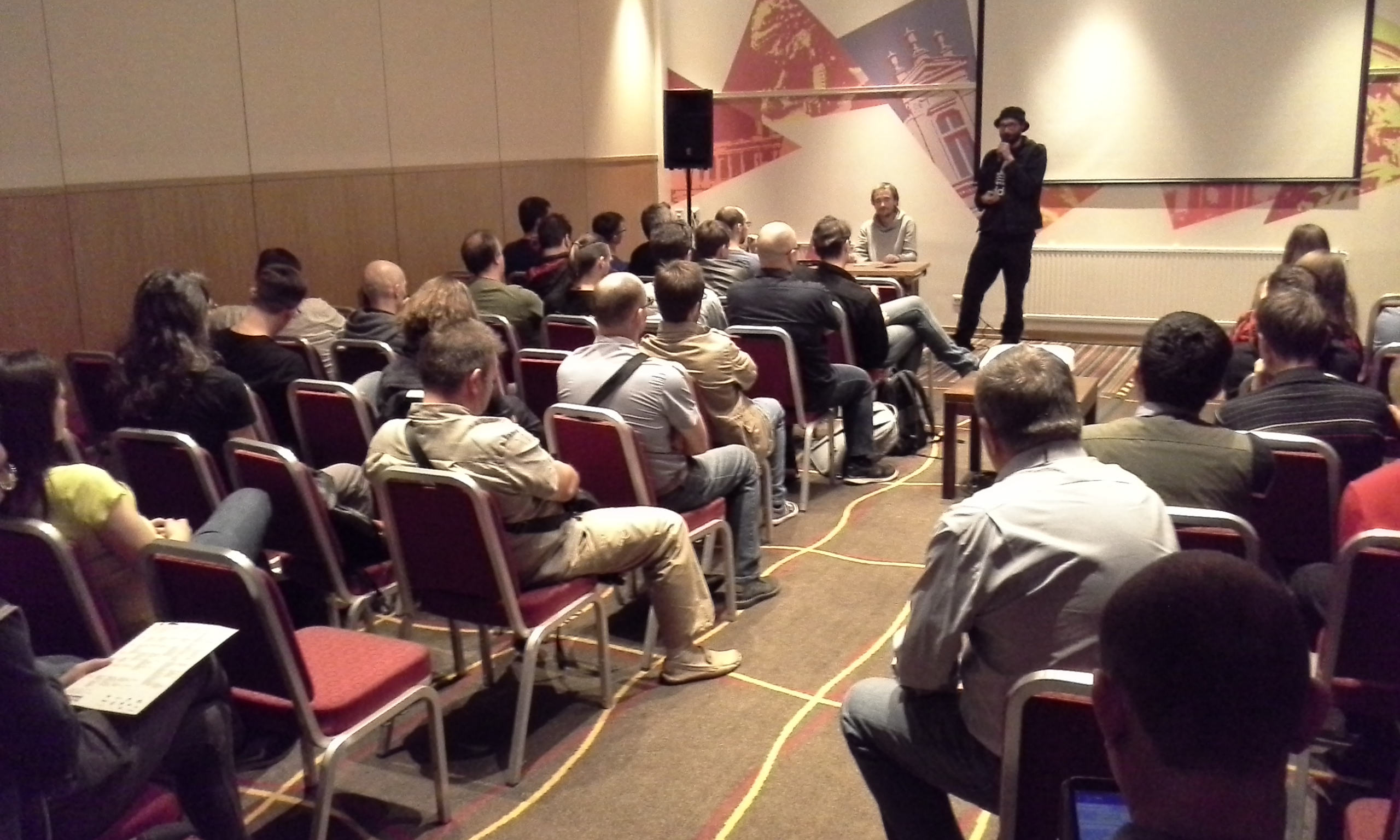
A hackers' talk at Chaos Constructions 2019

A users' group (also user's group or user group) is a type of club focused on the use of a particular technology, usually (but not always) computer-related.

== Overview ==
Users' groups started in the early days of mainframe computers, as a way to share sometimes hard-won knowledge and useful software, usually written by end users independently of the vendor-supplied programming efforts. SHARE, a user group originated by aerospace industry corporate users of IBM mainframe computers, was founded in 1955 and is the oldest computer user group still active. DECUS, the DEC User's Society, was founded in 1961 and its descendant organization, Connect Worldwide, still operates. The Computer Measurement Group (CMG) was founded in 1974 by systems professionals with a common interest in (mainframe) capacity management, and continues today with a much broader mission. The first UNIX users' group organized in 1978.

Users' groups began to proliferate with the microcomputer revolution of the late 1970s and early 1980s as hobbyists united to help each other with programming and configuration and use of hardware and software. Especially prior to the emergence of the World Wide Web, obtaining technical assistance with computers was often onerous, while computer clubs would gladly provide free technical support. Users' groups today continue to provide "real life" opportunities for learning from the shared experience of the members and may provide other functions such as a newsletter, group purchasing opportunities, tours of facilities, or speakers at group meetings.

A users' group may provide its members (and sometimes the general public as well) with one or more of the following services:

- periodic meetings
- annual or less frequent users conferences
- public lectures
- a newsletter
- a library of media or tools
- a software archive
- an online presence such as a dial-up BBS or Internet website
- swap meets
- technical support
- social events
- Code Camp

Users' groups may be organized around a particular brand of hardware (e.g., Mac), software and operating systems (e.g. Linux), or more rarely may be dedicated to retro systems (e.g., Apple II). An example of an early user group is the Apple User Group Connection.

== Computer user group ==
A computer user group (also known as a computer club) is a group of people who enjoy using microcomputers or personal computers and who meet regularly to discuss the use of computers, share knowledge and experience, hear from representatives of hardware manufacturers and software publishers, and hold other related activities. They may host special interest workgroups, often focusing on one particular aspect of computing.

Computer user groups meet both virtually and in hackerspaces. Computer user groups may consist of members who primarily use a specific operating system, such as Linux. While many hackers use free and open source software, others use Macintosh, RISC OS, Windows and Amiga OS. There are also other user groups that concentrate on either Mac OS (Macintosh User Group or MUG) or Linux (Linux User Group or LUG).

Many computer user groups belong to an umbrella organization, the Association of Personal Computer User Groups or APCUG.

== See also ==
- Hobby
- List of users' groups
