= NYLUG =

NYLUG (New York Linux Users Group) is a LUG (Linux User Group) based out of New York City. NYLUG supports all things Linux and FLOSS in the greater New York City area.

NYLUG meets on a monthly basis, and features a speaker or speakers who give presentations of interest to the NYLUG membership. These presentations are generally either technical or related to FLOSS. NYLUG's first presentation was in January, 1999 and NYLUG has been in continuous operation since then. As such, NYLUG is the oldest LUG in New York City.

NYLUG also runs a number of popular mailing lists and an IRC channel.

In addition to monthly presentations, NYLUG holds monthly workshops and occasional social events for its membership.

A significant number of members of NYLUG were involved in planning for the first DebConf in the United States - which was held in New York City in August 2010.

== Notable speakers ==
- Chris DiBona
- Theodore Ts'o
- Jon "maddog" Hall
- Jeremy Allison
- Dr. Eben Moglen
- Miguel de Icaza
- Eric S. Raymond
- Dan Ravicher
- Klaus Knopper
- Dave Aitel
- Benjamin Mako Hill
- Elliotte Rusty Harold
- Craig Nevill-Manning
- Moshe Bar
- Ian Pratt
- Alex Martelli
- Donald Becker
- Arthur Tyde
- Chris Blizzard
- Havoc Pennington
- Dr. Srinidhi Varadarajan
- Zed Shaw
- Russ Nelson
- David S. Miller
- Wietse Venema
- Gabriella Coleman
- Tom Limoncelli
- Thomas Bushnell
- Stefano Zacchiroli
- Lennart Poettering
- Karen Sandler
- Frank Karlitschek
- Chris Lamb (software_developer)
- David Reveman
- Michael Kerrisk
