= Suparna Bhattacharya =

Indian computer scientist

Suparna Bhattacharya is an Indian computer scientist known for her contributions to the Linux kernel, and also interested in applications of big data in artificial intelligence. She is an Hewlett Packard Enterprise Fellow at Hewlett Packard Labs.

== Education and career ==
Bhattacharya is the daughter of C. G. Bhattacharya, a statistician at the Indian Statistical Institute. She earned an undergraduate degree in electronics and electrical communication at IIT Kharagpur, in 1993.

Next, she worked for IBM from 1993 until 2014. She was elected to the IBM Academy of Technology in 2005, and promoted to Senior Technical Staff Member in 2006, the first woman at that level in IBM India. She moved internally to IBM Research in 2012. While working for IBM, she completed a Ph.D. in computer science and automation at the Indian Institute of Science (IISc), in 2013, winning the IISc Alumni gold medal for her dissertation on power-aware software.

After moving to Hewlett Packard Enterprise as a distinguished technologist, she was named as an HPE Fellow in 2023.

== Recognition ==
Bhattacharya was named to the Indian National Academy of Engineering in 2020. She was elected as an IEEE Fellow in 2022, "for contributions to Linux kernel for enterprise and advanced data processing systems".

In 2020, IEEE India recognized her as their Woman Technologist of the Year.
