= RLUG =

RLUG stands for Romanian Linux Users Group.

RLUG is the largest and oldest Linux community in Romania, formed around 1999, with more than 2000 members subscribed to the main mailing list.

RLUG is an unofficial organization that promotes Linux and other Unix-like operating systems in Romania as well as free and open source software in general.

RLUG offers help for Linux/Unix/OSS users through its wiki, dedicated mailing lists and IRC, and hosts a number of software mirrors.

All services are free and offered by volunteers, as is common among all Linux user groups and other Free Software communities.

The community is sustained by its members (through hardware, financial donations, services) and by two of the main ISPs in Romania iNES and GTS.
