= Panini Keypad =

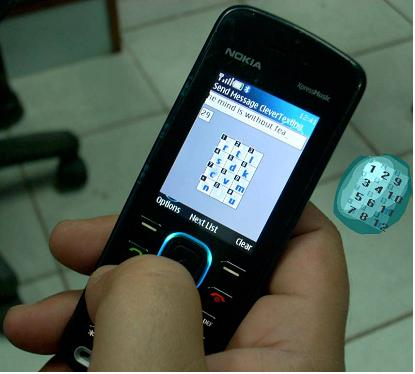
Image in a Nokia

The Panini Keypad is a typing technology developed by Luna Ergonomics (a subsidiary of Noida) and named after Panini. It is an application that offers single key press input in Indian languages on mobile. So far, it supports Hindi, Bengali, Assamese, Telugu, Marathi, Tamil, Gujarati, Kannada, Malayalam and Punjabi.

The technology is based on CleverTexting; patented predictive texting software which creates an ergonomic dynamic virtual keypad using statistical predictions based on corpora linguistics. The software uses a form of compression to increase the number of characters in each text message to 210. The Panini keyboard can also be used on laptops, tablets and desktop computers.
