= Beijing GNU/Linux User Group =

The Beijing GNU/Linux User Group (BLUG) was founded in Beijing on November 19, 2002, and has since met at least monthly without exception. It was awarded Best SFD 2007 event (1 of 3), Golden Bull 2008 by CSDN as a technology driving group, and Best LUG of the Month by Linux Format early 2008. The Beijing GNU/Linux User Group has also been the host of many famous actors of our movement such as RMS, Ulrich Drepper, Mark Shuttleworth, or Louis Suarez, to name just a few.

The BLUG has grown from a monthly meeting organizer to offering a wide array of activities nowadays ranging from writing software to hacking hardware or just having fun around local food and drinks. Definitely a great bunch to visit if you're in town.

== Events ==
- Meet every 2nd Tuesday of the month for regular meetings
- Meet every other Tuesday as a social, geeky gathering which is called BLUG Tuesday
- Meet almost every 1st Saturday of the month for Coding for Fun (a hackathon kind of event)
- One should check the website/IRC channel to make sure the event is on

== See also ==
- Linux User Group
