= NGO Coordination and Resource Centre =

The Non-governmental organization Coordination and Resource Centre (NCRC) is a joint initiative of the South Indian Federation of Fishermen Societies SIFFS and Social Need Education and Human Awareness (SNEHA), supported by the United Nations Development Programme (UNDP) and the Nagapattinam District Administration is a coordinating and facilitating agency to link the Tsunami affected communities with aid organisations and the government, and ensure appropriate, adequate and timely information flows between all stakeholders involved in relief and rehabilitation efforts in Nagapattinam. NCRC has been shut down on 31 Dec 2007 and its CEO & staff, programmes and governance mechanisms have been transferred to the long-term entity BEDROC.

== Genesis ==
The tsunami that hit the south-eastern coast of India resulted in an immediate action by non-governmental organizations (NGOs) throughout the country in rushing requirements and providing relief to the victims. The South Indian Federation of Fishermen Societies (SIFFS) and SNEHA, NGOs working in the fishing, initiated an NGO Coordination Centre (NCC) in Nagapattinam District Collectorate since 1 January 2005 for enabling a more coordinated action and interaction between the District Administration, NGOs and areas affected by the tsunami in the district.

During the first month of relief operations, the NGO Co-ordination Centre ensured a transparent relationship with the government officers on a daily basis. About 400 NGOs registered at the centre during the first few days. Using these volunteers, the NGO Co-ordination centre set up a two-way information flow on the requirements of the villages and the materials available with the government and NGOs.

Three months later, NGO Coordination Centre metamorphosed into NGO Coordination and Resource Centre (NCRC) to continue its activities in the rehabilitation phase. NCRC adopted the model of public-private partnering by promoting coordination among the NGOs and the government.

== Village Information Centre(VIC) of NCRC ==
=== Origin ===
The district of Nagapattinam has a coastal line of 141 km. The devastation in Nagapattinam has severely affected about 80 villages. Many more have faced damage in varying degrees. Fishing villages dominate this coastal district and nearly 70 percent of the severely affected villages are fishing villages. NCRC has selected 12 strategic locations in this region and has set up village information centre to maximize the reach throughout this district. Each VIC covers five to six villages.

=== What do information centres do? ===
- Collect information from the communities on details of damages, compensations, allotment of houses, etc. at the village level and provide them with information on support and services available.
- Provide information to NCRC and other stakeholders on what is happening in the field
- Reach out to the communities in backward and vulnerable areas to ensure that they have access to support and that their needs are accounted for in the rehabilitation process
- Coordinate with support organisations and service provides whenever support and services are required

== Closure ==
As decided during its initiation, NCRC has been shut down in its current form on 31 Dec 2007. This was primarily because NCRC was a pro-term project and had no legal status. Considering the fact that many of the initiatives that NCRC had launched were longer-term in nature, the Steering Committee of NCRC decided to set up a new legal entity to take forward the longer-term initiatives started by it.

This organization, Building and Enabling Disaster Resilience of Coastal Communities (BEDROC), launched in January 2008, continues with the same CEO (Ms. Annie George) and her team, as well as most of the Steering Committee.
