= South Indian Federation of Fishermen Societies =

South Indian Federation of Fishermen Societies (SIFFS) is a non-governmental organization (NGO) working in the marine fisheries sector. SIFFS is the apex body of organizations of small-scale artisanal fish workers based out at Thiruvananthapuram in Kerala. It has a three-tier organisational structure.

With over 6,000 member fishermen, organised through 100 primary societies in eight districts of Southern peninsular India, SIFFS over the last two decades has kept its focus on strengthening the artisanal fisheries.

Established essentially as a fish-marketing organisation, SIFFS now provides a range of services to member and non-member fish workers. At present, over 50,000 fish workers including non-members are availing these services, in their numerous endeavors to assume collective control over their own destinies.

The tsunami that was caused by the 2004 Indian Ocean earthquake off the Indonesian island of Sumatra struck the Indian coast on 26 December 2004. This unprecedented event killed thousands of people, destroyed their houses and property, and made several thousands stranded across the coast line. The death toll in India is mainly in Tamil Nadu, Kerala, and Andhra Pradesh. Naturally, the fisherpeople are the worst hit. Thousands have died, several fishing villages were just wiped away.

SIFFS actively participated in the relief and rehabilitation activities mainly in Nagapattinam and Kanyakumari districts of Tamil Nadu. SIFFS focussed on these two districts for two reasons: first, these are the districts that have been affected the worst. Secondly, these are the districts where SIFFS has its presence through primary fishermen societies. At Nagapattinam, SIFFS was instrumental in founding the NGO Co-ordination and Resource Centre (NCRC).

Policy Research and Documentation forms a thrust area of SIFFS operations. Educating the policy makers, fisherfolk and other people by entering into dialogues with them is undertaken as part of policy research and documentation. To this end, SIFFS has undertaken many research projects, singly and jointly with following objectives.

- Promotion of socio-economic, environmental and technical investigation of issues pertinent to fisheries in response to fisheries development and management needs.
- Enhance coordination and cooperation between relevant organisations working in fisheries' related activities
- Enhance awareness and capacity of stakeholders to ensure sustainable fishery
- Raise consensus among stakeholders on approaches to address the sustainable management resources.

== Documentation Centre ==
SIFFS is in the process of standardising its documentation system. The documentation centre at present has 1,265 books that include 824 fishery related books coming under seven main categories and 20 sub-categories and 441 non-fishery books falling under 11 categories.

Year-wise/issue number wise compilation of fishery and general/non-fishery journals has been undertaken and the documentation centre now boasts of 43 volumes consisting of 3,950 articles. Significantly, the compilation includes 3,531 articles extending to 36 volumes spanning across 335 issues pertaining to the fisheries sector. The Documentation Centre also has put together 7 volumes of general journals incorporating 43 issues and 419 articles.

The Documentation Centre also maintains 17 files that contain articles, news, brochures and other miscellaneous information.

== Executive Leadership ==
The first Chief Executive of SIFFS was Mr V. Vivekanandan, who joined SIFFS in 1982 after passing out of IRMA who continued until 1994. Satish Babu, also an alumnus of IRMA, was the next Chief Executive, holding the position from 1994 to 2000. S.Ephrem was the next Chief Executive of SIFFS, (2000-2011), followed by Julian Teelar (2011-2015) and X. Joseph (2015-2025). From the year 2025 Mr. John Bosco A is the current CEO of SIFFS.
