= National Resource Centre for Free/Open Source Software =

Logo of NRCFOSS

National Resource Centre for Free/Open Source Software (NRCFOSS) is an organisation created and financed in India by the Department of Information Technology, Ministry of Communication and Information Technology, Government of India in April 2005.

It is jointly administered by the Chennai Division of Centre for Development of Advanced Computing (C-DAC) and the AU-KBC Research Centre of Anna University.

Some state governments, for example Kerala, already have programmes to popularize FOSS among the masses especially among the students. The founding of NRCFOSS is the first initiative by the Government of India in the direction of making efforts for increasing the acceptance of FOSS at a national level. NRCFOSS is designed to give a boost to the efforts to popularize FOSS products among lay computer users of India.

== Objectives ==
NRCFOSS is mandated to work in areas related to Free/Open Source Software basically with the following objectives:

- Human resource development by
  - training engineering teachers in the formal sector
  - giving support to educational agencies in the nonformal sector.
- Development of technology, tools and solutions by
  - making available certified tools to industry and users
  - creating a repository of information on resources.
- Localisation for Indian languages by
  - enhancing the presence and visibility of Indian Languages on the web
  - coordinating with various local language communities.
- Policy formulation and global networking by
  - providing support to the Government and other agencies in policy and program formulation
  - joining global networks, especially with similarly placed nations, and participating in international events.
- Entrepreneurship development by
  - creating appropriate business models.

== Initial achievements ==
NRCFOSS has caused the introduction of elective papers in FOSS in the syllabi and curriculum of Anna University. The syllabi is applicable to around 250 engineering colleges affiliated to Anna University. It has prepared the entire course material for these elective papers and made it available for free download.

NRCFOSS has organized a series of workshops and seminars in different parts of India to popularize the idea of FOSS. It developed the FOSS Lab Server as an archive of various resources that are essential for the students taking FOSS courses.

It contains source code, documentation and mailing list archives. NRCFOSS developed Bharat Operating System Solutions a Linux distribution made specifically for the Indian environment.

The latest version of this Free/Open Source Software, BOSS GNU/Linux v10.0, was released on 18 March 2024. This software supports eighteen Indian languages out of a total of twenty-two constitutionally recognized languages in India at the desktop level.
