= International Collective in Support of Fishworkers =

Non-government organisation

International Collective in Support of Fishworkers (ICSF) is a non-government organisation that intends to be a supportive network of fishworkers and fish mongers.

The main objectives of ICSF are to:

- monitor issues that relate to the life, livelihood and living conditions of fishworkers around the world;
- disseminate information on these issues, particularly amongst fisherfolk;
- prepare guidelines for policymakers that stress fisheries development and management of a just, participatory and sustainable nature; and
- help create the space and momentum for the development of alternatives in the small-scale fisheries sector.
