= Bangalore Linux User Group =

Open software club

BLUG logo, created by Harikrishnan C

The Bangalore Linux Users Group (BLUG) is a Free and Open Source Software (FOSS) user group.

== History ==
Formed in 1998, the group participated in Bangalore IT.COM 1999 (now known as Bangalore IT.in), then India's largest technology event. The Government of Karnataka gave the BLUG an entire pavilion, where it exhibited Linux-based machines showing various applications, under the motto "Seeing is believing".

Over the years, the BLUG participated in a number of technology events, and from 2001 to 2004 facilitated Linux Bangalore, a FOSS event with thousands of delegates from India and abroad. The current edition of the event is called FOSS.IN.

In late 2000, the BLUG was registered as a not-for-profit society, under the Karnataka Societies Registration Act 1960.

During 2004–2005, recognising that Linux and Open Source had become mainstream technologies and did not need generic advocacy, members of the group proposed creating smaller groups in Bangalore, leading to the formation of Special Interest Groups (SIGs). Another outcome was regular Birds of a Feather (BOF) meet-ups every fortnight at locations across the city.

In February 2005, the BLUG was named the "Most Popular Indian Linux User Group" at the Linux Asia conference in New Delhi.

In mid-2005, the BLUG regrouped and resumed its activities, including meetings, while at the same time adopting the role of a staging platform for multiple FOSS activities, especially amongst students. From late 2005 onwards, the BLUG began an educational campaign at technical colleges, with members speaking about technical and non-technical FOSS topics at student-arranged events in colleges.

== See also ==
- ILUG-Delhi
- Bharat Operating System Solutions
