= Bharat Operating System Solutions =

Indian Debian-based Linux distribution

BOSS Linux
- Developer: C-DAC/NRCFOSS
- OS family: Linux (Unix-like)
- Working state: Current
- Source model: Open-source (The source was never made freely available to the public)
- Initial release: 10-January-2007 (19 years ago)
- Latest release: 10.0 ("Pragya") / 15-March-2024 (2 years ago)
- Marketing target: Desktop computer, Laptop, Education, and Server
- Available in: 19 languages
- List of languages Assamese, Bengali, English (India), Gujarati, Hindi, Kannada, Malayalam, Marathi, Odia, Punjabi, Sanskrit, Tamil, Telugu, Bodo, Urdu, Kashmiri, Maithili, Konkani and Manipuri
- Update method: APT (several front-ends available)
- Package manager: dpkg
- Supported platforms: x86-64
- Kernel type: Monolithic (Linux)
- Userland: GNU
- Default user interface: Cinnamon
- License: Derived from GNU software but does not accept changes.
- Official website: bosslinux.in

Bharat Operating System Solutions GNU/Linux, also referred to as BOSS Linux, is an Indian Linux distribution based on Debian. The latest stable release is 10.0 (Pragya), which was released in March-2024.

== Editions ==
BOSS Linux was released in various editions for different purposes:

- BOSS Desktop: Designed for personal, home, and office use.
- EduBOSS: Designed for schools and educational institutions.
- BOSS Server: Server variant of BOSS GNU/Linux supports Intel and AMD architectures.
- BOSS MOOL: A special edition for maintainability by changing how kernel drivers are loaded as modules.
- Secure BOSS: A Secure Linux distribution with access control and security policies.
- CDAC ERP: ERP is an application to automate the business processes.

== History ==
BOSS Linux was developed by the Centre for Development of Advanced Computing with the aim of promoting the adoption of free and open-source software throughout India. As a deliverable software of the National Resource Centre for Free and Open Source Software, it has a desktop environment that includes support for various Indian language and instructional software.

The software was endorsed by the Government of India for adoption and implementation in India. BOSS Linux has been certified by the Linux Foundation for compliance with the Linux Standard Base. BOSS Linux supported Intel and AMD IA-32/x86-64 architecture until version 6 ("Anoop"). Version 7 ("Drishti") onward only supports the x86-64 architecture.

== Versions ==
BOSS Linux has nine major releases:

Legend:
Unsupported
Latest version

Version	Code name	Kernel version	Desktop	Date of Release	End of Support Date
Evaluation	Sethu	2.6.14-2-smp	GNOME 2.8		
1.0	Tarag	2.6.17-1-i386	GNOME 2.14	January-2006	
2.0	Anant	2.6.21-1-486	GNOME 2.18	September-2007	
3.0	Tejas	2.6.22-3-486	GNOME 2.20	September-2008	
4.0	Savir	2.6.32-5-686	GNOME 2.30.2	April-2011	
5.0	Anokha	3.10	GNOME 3.4.2	September-2013	
6.0	Anoop	3.16.0-4-686	GNOME 3.14.4	August-2015	
7.0	Drishti	4.9.0-8-amd64	GNOME 3.22	22-June-2017	21-June-2022
8.0	Unnati	5.2	Cinnamon	03-October-2019	03-October-2023
9.0	Urja	5.10	Cinnamon	02-April-2022	30-June-2026
10.0	Pragya	#	Cinnamon	18-March-2024	30-June-2028

=== BOSS 5.0 (Anokha) ===
This release came with many new applications focused mainly on enhanced security and user-friendliness. The distribution included over 12,800 new packages, for a total of over 37,493. Most of the software in the distribution had been updated as well: over 20,160 software packages (70% of all packages in Savir). BOSS 5.0 supported Linux Standard Base (LSB) version 4.1. It also featured XBMC to allow users to easily browse and view videos, photos, podcasts, and music from a hard drive, optical disc, local network, and the Internet.

=== BOSS 6.0 (Anoop) ===
Notable changes in this release include a kernel update from 3.10 to 3.16, a shift for system boot from init to systemd, the full support of GNOME Shell as part of GNOME 3.14, an updated version of GRUB, the Iceweasel browser being replaced by Firefox and the Pidgin messaging client replacing Empathy, as well as several repository versions of available programs being updated as part of the release.

BOSS Linux 6.0 also shipped various application and program updates, such as LibreOffice, X.Org, Evolution, GIMP, VLC media player, GTK+, GCC, GNOME Keyring, and Python.

Related specifically to localization support, language support improved with the replacement of SCIM with IBus with the Integrated System Settings. Indic languages enabled with "Region and Languages" are now directly mapped to the IBus, and the OnScreenKeyboard layout is provided for all layouts.

This release is fully compatible with LSB 4.1.

=== BOSS 7.0 (Drishti) ===
The most significant change over previous releases is that this release does not support x86 and BOSS is now only available for the x86-64 architecture. Other notable changes include a kernel update to 4.9.0, a GNOME update from 3.14 to 3.22, and software updates to various applications and programs with wide Indian language support & packages. This release aims to enhance the user interface with more glossy themes and is coupled with the latest applications from the community.

=== BOSS 8.0 (Unnati) ===
The desktop environment is changed from GNOME to Cinnamon.

=== BOSS 9.0 (Urja) ===
The Linux kernel was updated from 5.2 to 5.10.

=== BOSS 10.0 (Pragya) ===
BOSS GNU/Linux version 10 features the Cinnamon Desktop Environment and aims to provide a complete e-Governance stack based on free and open source software. (Note: Despite the name, the source code of BOSS GNU/Linux is not publicly available.) The recommended system requirements include 2 GB of RAM, 15 GB of hard drive space, and a minimum 1GHz Pentium processor.

== Cyberattacks ==
In October 2025, the Pakistan-linked advanced persistent threat (APT) group APT36, also known as Transparent Tribe, had expanded its operations to target India’s Bharat Operating System Solutions (BOSS) Linux platform. The vulnerability exploited in this campaign was later patched by security researcher Kiran Singh Rajpurohit.

== See also ==
- Debian
- Free Software Movement of India
- Comparison of Linux distributions
- Free culture movement
- Simputer
