= ICFOSS =

Organization in Thiruvananthapuram, Kerala, India

International Centre for Free and Open Source Software
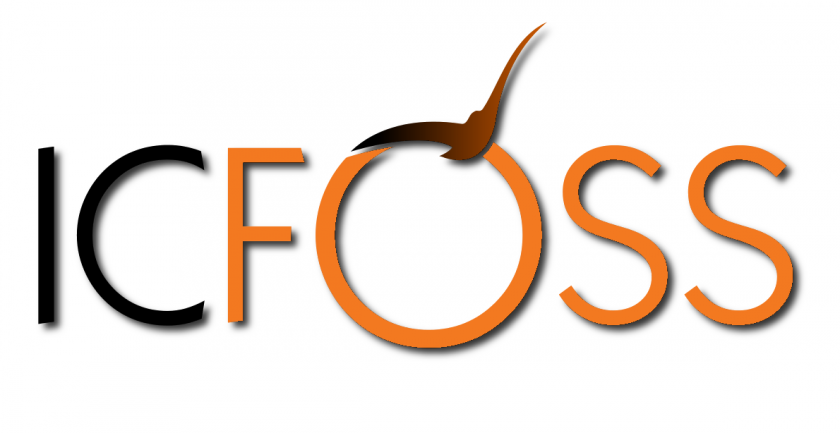

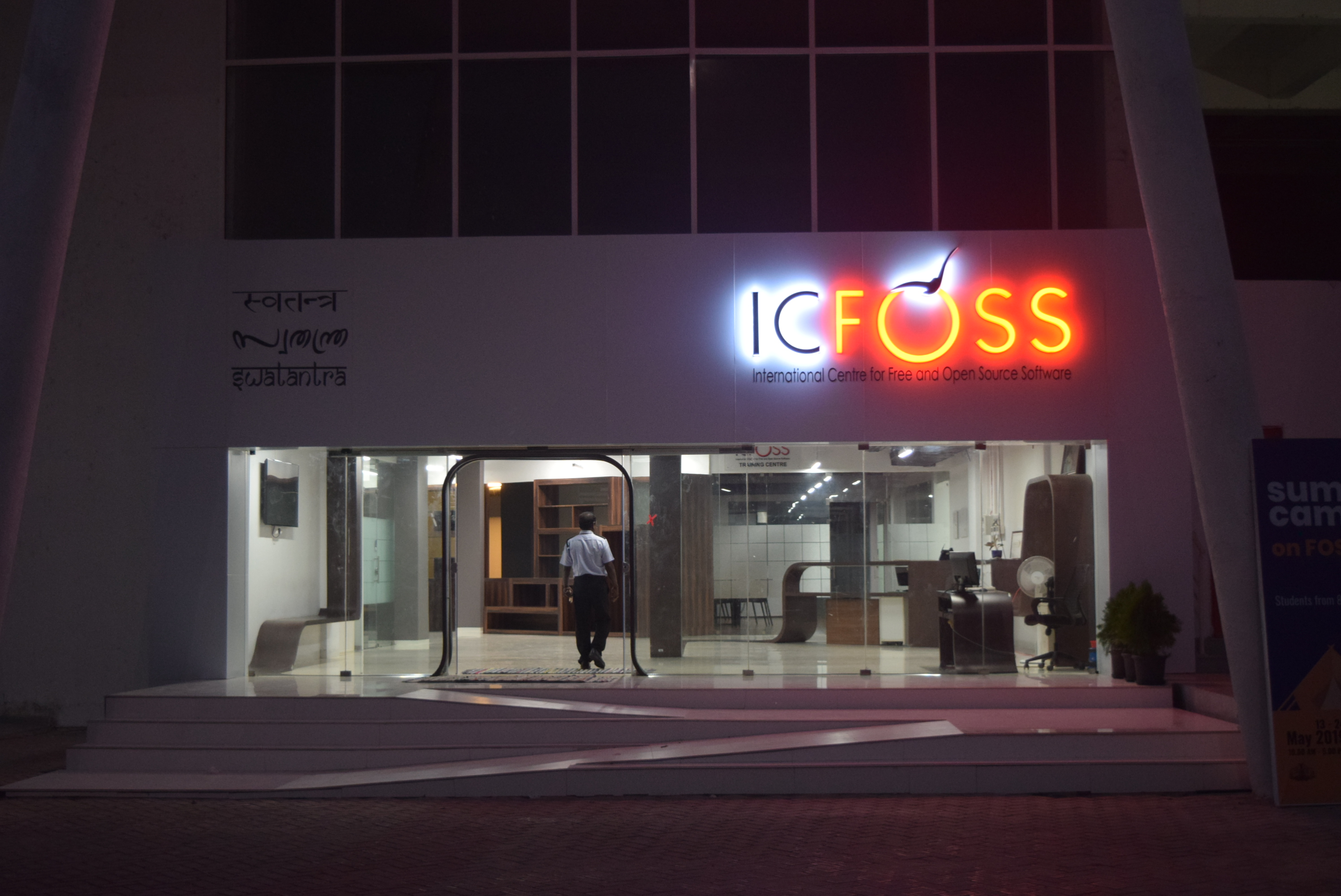
- Entrance of ICFOSS at Green Field Stadium, Thiruvananthapuram
- Founded: 28 August 2009
- Type: Government
- Location: Thiruvananthapuram, Kerala, India
- Origins: 2001 Conference "Freedom First!"
- Owner: Government of Kerala
- Key people: Sasi P. Meethal
- Budget: 5.5 Crores
- Staff: 100
- Website: https://icfoss.in/

International Centre for Free and Open Source Software (ICFOSS) is an autonomous organization set up by the Government of Kerala, India and having the combined mandate of popularizing Free and Open Source Software for universal use; consolidating the early FOSS work done in Kerala; and networking with different nations, communities and governments to collaboratively promote FOSS.

== Origins ==
Kerala was the first state in India to formally adopt a pro-FOSS IT policy in 2001. This main impetus for this step came from the landmark conference "Freedom First!" convened by a group of activists and supported by the government of Kerala, where the Free Software Foundation of India (FSF-India) was inaugurated by Richard Stallman, the founder of the GNU Project.

== Genesis ==
Kerala followed the 2001 conference with a conference series "Free Software, Free Society (FSFS)", held in 2005 and 2008 (with the third of the series being convened in the second half of 2011. This event also commemorated the tenth anniversary of the 2001 conference). In 2008, the Government of Kerala set up a commission under the leadership of Dr. Rahul De of IIM Bangalore to study how to take forward the momentum that Kerala had built up in FOSS. The activist community proposed to the Commission that an International Centre be set up that has a clear mandate on co-ordinating all FOSS efforts in Kerala, and also continued the multi-nation, multistakeholder networking that commenced from the FSFS conferences.

== Activities ==
- Handbook on e-Governance, Malayalam Spell Checker
- T-Slide, mouse for people with motor disability
- Kerala's first public LoRaWAN Network in Technopark Campus to promote Open Source IoT.
- Low-cost telepresence robot developed on open source platform

== Image Gallery ==
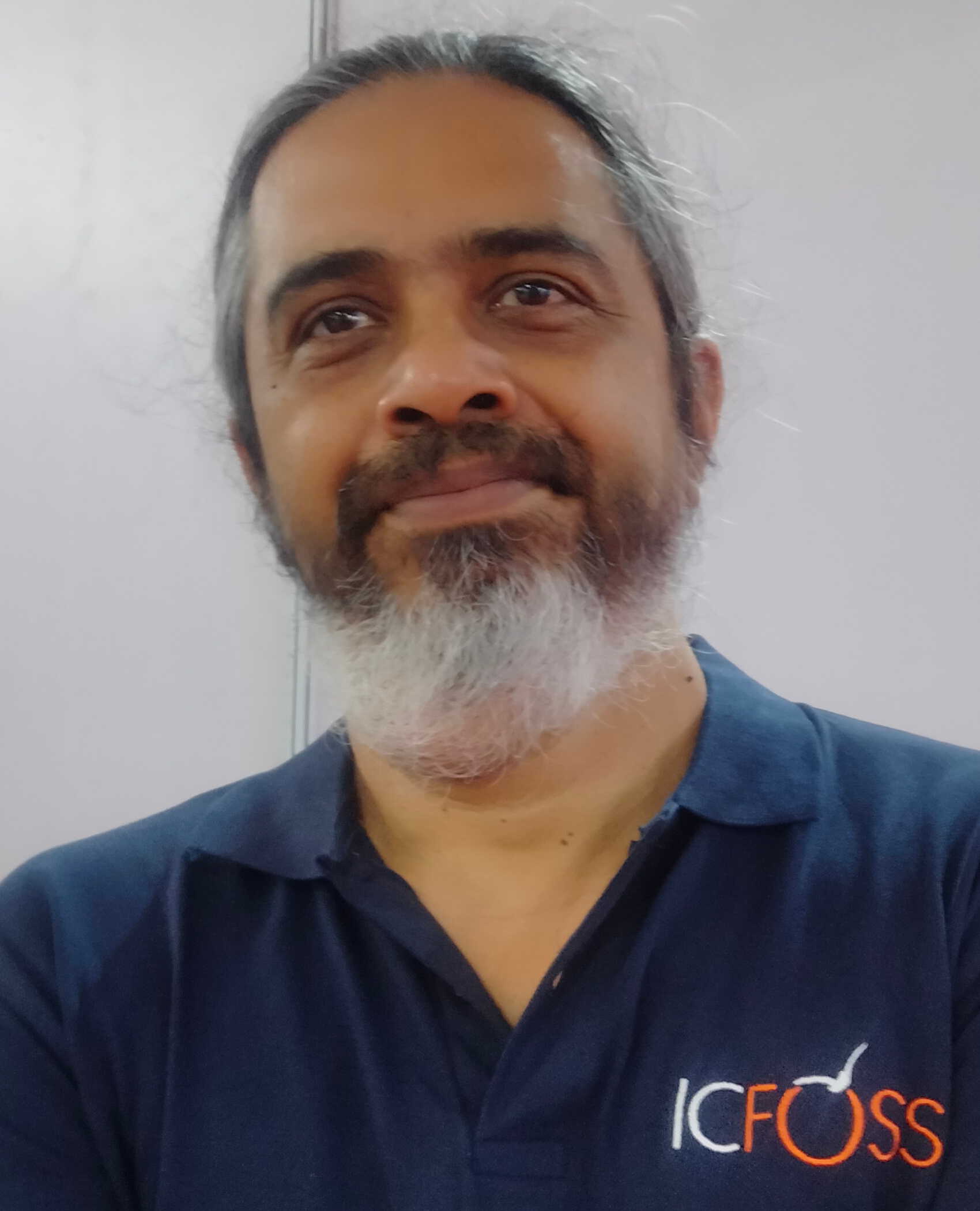
Sunil T.T, Director ICFOSS (2023)
