= List of free-software events =

The following is a list of computer conferences and other events focused on developing and using free and open-source software (FOSS).

== General free-software events ==
Some general-purpose free-software events have Linux in their name, often because they began as Linux-only events before broadening their focus.

=== North, Central and South America ===
- Festival Latinoamericano de Instalación de Software Libre (FLISOL) – Latin American free software install fest held yearly in all Latin America the same day, on the last Sunday of April
- LibrePlanet – Organized yearly by the Free Software Foundation in or around Boston, Massachusetts since 2006
- LinuxFest Northwest, held in Bellingham, Washington in the spring since 2000
- SouthEast LinuxFest, held yearly in June since 2009.
- Southern California Linux Expo (SCALE), held in Los Angeles yearly since 2002
- All Things Open, held in Raleigh, N.C., since 2013

=== Europe ===
- Chaos Communication Congress, held in Germany in the week between Christmas and New Year since 1984
- Chemnitz Linux Days, held in Chemnitz, Germany since 1999
- DevConf.cz, held yearly in Brno, Czech Republic since 2009
- Fosscomm, held yearly in a different Greek city since 2008
- FOSDEM, held in Brussels, Belgium every February since 2001
- FrOSCon, held in Sankt Augustin (near Bonn), Germany since 2006
- Linux Day, held across Italy since 2001
- Linux Vacation / Eastern Europe, held in Belarus every summer since 2005
- OpenFest, held in Sofia, Bulgaria every autumn since 2003
- SFSCON, held in Bolzano, Italy since 2004

=== Asia and Australia ===
- FOSS for All Conference, held in Seoul, South Korea, every autumn since 2025
- FOSSASIA, held yearly in Singapore, Vietnam, Thailand, India or China since 2009
- COSCUP, held yearly in Taiwan since 2006
- linux.conf.au, held in Australia or New Zealand in the (Southern Hemisphere) summer since 1999

=== International ===
- Open Source Summit, known before 2017 as "LinuxCon", held several times yearly on various continents since 2009
- Software Freedom Day, international observance since 2004
- Open Forum Academy Symposium, academic conference covering questions related to the social, political and economic impact of Open Source

=== Defunct ===
- Africa Source, held in 2004 and 2006
- Asia Source, held in 2005, 2007 and 2009
- August Penguin, held yearly in Israel from 2004–2018
- FOSS.IN, first known as "Linux Bangalore", from 2001–2012
- Fórum Internacional Software Livre (FISL) – International Free Software Forum, held yearly in Porto Alegre, Brazil (with 7000+ visitors) from 2000–2018
- Free Software and Open Source Symposium (FSOSS), held at Seneca College, Toronto each October from 2001–2018
- FSCONS, held every autumn in Gothenburg, Sweden from 2007–2019
- Libre Software Meeting, French name "Rencontres mondiales du logiciel libre", held every July in France or surrounding countries from 2000–2018
- Linux Bier Wanderung, informal event held in a different European country every summer from 1999–2019
- Ontario Linux Fest, held in Toronto, Ontario in the autumn from 2007–2009
- Open Source Day, conference held yearly in Warsaw, Poland from 2008–2019
- Open Source Developers' Conference (OSDC), held yearly in various countries from 2004–2015
- Solutions Linux, a trade show and conference with 10,000 visitors held every year in Paris from 1999–2014
- O'Reilly Open Source Convention (OSCON), held each summer in the US from 1999–2019.
- LinuxWorld Conference and Expo, briefly also known as "OpenSource World", from 1998–2009
- Wizards of OS, held in Berlin every two years from 1999–2006
- LinuxTag, held in Germany every summer from 1996–2014

== Events for specific free software ==
=== Operating systems ===
- Debian Conference (DebConf) – conference for the Debian operating system, held yearly since 2000
- Linux Kernel Developers Summit, annual conference since 2001
- Ubuntu Developer Summit, held twice yearly (timed to fit Ubuntu releases), alternating between Europe and North America, from 2004–2015
- Berkeley Software Distribution (BSD) operating system (DragonFly BSD, FreeBSD, NetBSD, OpenBSD) conferences:
  - EuroBSDCon, held yearly since 2001 in different European cities
  - BSDCan, held yearly since 2004 in Ottawa, Canada, North America

=== Programming languages ===
- PyCon – conference for the Python language, held several times yearly in various locations since 2003
- RubyConf – conference for the Ruby language, held once yearly in various locations since 2002
- Yet Another Perl Conference – conference for the Perl language, held several times yearly since 1999

=== Other ===
- Akademy – conference for the KDE desktop environment, held yearly in Europe since 1997
- Community Over Code – conference for the Apache Software Foundation and previously named ApacheCon, held once or twice yearly since 2000
- DjangoCon – conference for the Django web framework, held twice yearly (once each in Europe or the U.S.) since 2008
- DrupalCon – conference for the Drupal content management framework, held twice yearly (once each in Europe or North America) since 2007
- GNOME Users And Developers European Conference (GUADEC) – conference for the GNOME desktop environment, held yearly in Europe since 2000
- GNUHealthCon – conference for the GNU Health hospital management and digital health ecosystem, held yearly since 2010
- WordCamp – event for the WordPress content management system, held often around the world since 2007
- X.Org Developers' Conference (XDC) and X Developers' Summit (XDS), annual events since 2005 organized by X.Org Foundation
- Libre Graphics Meeting, held yearly in May in Europe or Canada since 2006

=== Defunct ===
- BeGeistert – conference for the Haiku operating system, held yearly in Europe from 2006–2016 (originally a BeOS conference, from 1998–2005)
- GCC Summit, held in Ottawa, Ontario, Canada from 2003–2010
- Gelato ICE, held yearly in the US or Italy by the Gelato Federation from 2001–2007
- Joomla World Conference – event for the Joomla content management system, held often around the world from 2011–2019
- Linux Kongress, held in Germany in the autumn from 1994–2010
- Linux Symposium, held in Canada in the summer from 1999–2014
