= OLF =

Olf or OLF may refer to:

- Office québécois de la langue française, Canada
- Ontario Linux Fest, technology conference in Canada
- Oromo Liberation Front, a nationalist political party in Oromia, Ethiopia.
- Our Lady of Fatima High School, Aligarh, India
- Outlying Landing Field, a type of airfield used by the U.S. Navy
- Olf (unit), odor emission measurement unit
- Oldfield Park railway station (National Rail station code OLF), Bath, Somerset, UK
- L. M. Clayton Airport (IATA airport code OLF), Montana, U.S.
- Norwegian Oil Industry Association
- Edson Olf (born 1986), Dutch politician
