= Open Source Day =

Open Source Day Conference logo

Open Source Day is an international conference gathering fans of open solutions from Central and Eastern Europe. Mission of the event is to introduce open source solutions to Polish public and business institutions and popularize it as a secure, efficient, cost saving alternative to proprietary software. The conference has taken place in Warsaw since its beginning in 2007. Participants are mainly managers, developers, technical officers of public, banking, and insurance industries.

The conference has become a platform for exchanging experience, contacts and use cases of open source solutions in fields of: virtualization, cloud computing, database, big data, Information security.

== Promotion of Open Source software ==
Founders of the conference believe that by making open software popular they might initialize local communities as well as give start to small businesses in Poland which would provide support and develop open source solutions locally. Due to its role in promoting Open Source software in wider business and public applications, the Open Source Day Conference won support from public administration and were operated under the auspices of: Ministry of Education, Ministry of Administration and Digitization, Ministry of Economy and European Commission as well.

== History ==
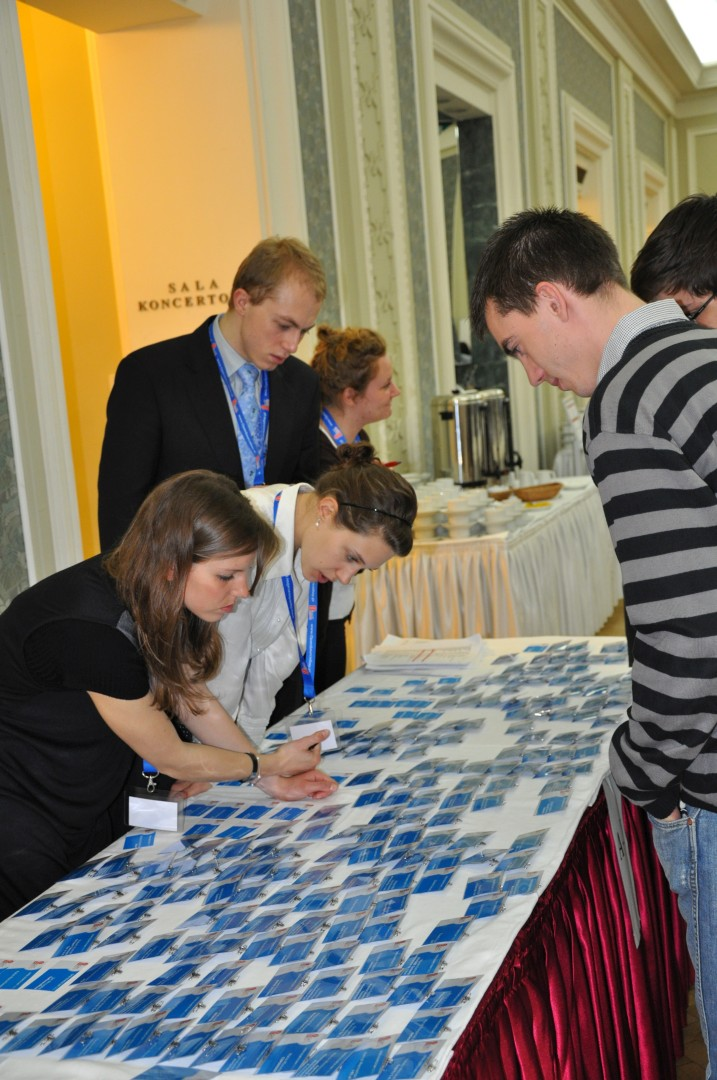
More than 400 participants registered for the 3rd Open Source Day in 2010

Open Source Day was launched in 2007 by a handful of open source enthusiasts. They wanted to inform the public about the opportunities open software provides for market. Initial event drew only a moderate number of participants. Since then however each consecutive edition the event has grown in scope of subjects as well as the size of auditorium.

=== Open Source Day 2008 ===
The first full-fledged conference of Open Source Day took place on 9 April in Radisson SAS Hotel, Warsaw. Seven sessions were organized on different open source successful implementations in public administration: French project Copernic, city administration of Vienna and Swedish Police. Technical presentation were dealing with open source project: Xen, SELinux (Security Enhanced Linux), Metamatrix and SOA.

=== Open Source Day 2009 ===
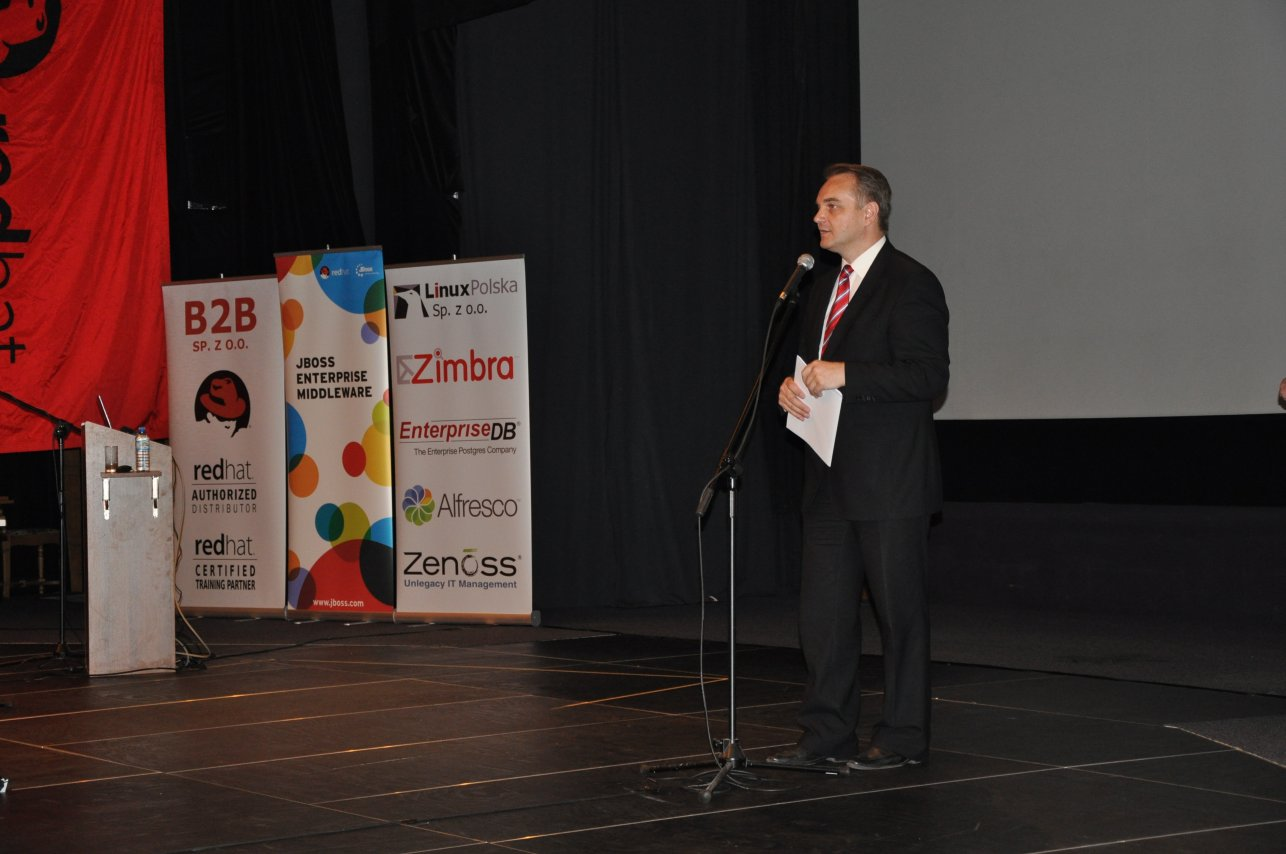
Deputy Prime Minister, Minister of Economy, Waldemar Pawlak having a keynote during the 3rd Open Source Day

The 2nd Open Source Day Conference took place on 6 May 2009 in the Radisson Blu Sobieski Hotel in Warsaw. 350 attendees participated. The event was supported by main technological partners Red Hat and IBM. Technical sessions covered: enterprise-class Linux distributions, virtualization, application servers and SOA platforms as well.

=== Open Source Day 2010 ===
The 3rd Open Source Day Conference came about on 12 May 2010 in the Palace of Culture and Science in Warsaw. The event gathered 400 guests and was supported by 12 technology vendors and 5 media partners. Polish Deputy Prime Minister Waldemar Pawlak had an opening keynote focusing on the major impact of Open Source on the IT market as a competitive alternative to proprietary solutions and reiterating an opportunity for the Polish IT professionals in deepening its participation in the world-wide IT revolution. Open Source trends were discussed from the point of view of Red Hat by its Vice President Werner Knoblich. During consecutive sessions latest updates about Open Source technologies were presented: middleware: JBoss, RDBMS: PostgreSQL/EnterpriseDB and MySQL as well as Alfresco (software) and Zimbra.

=== Open Source Day 2011 ===
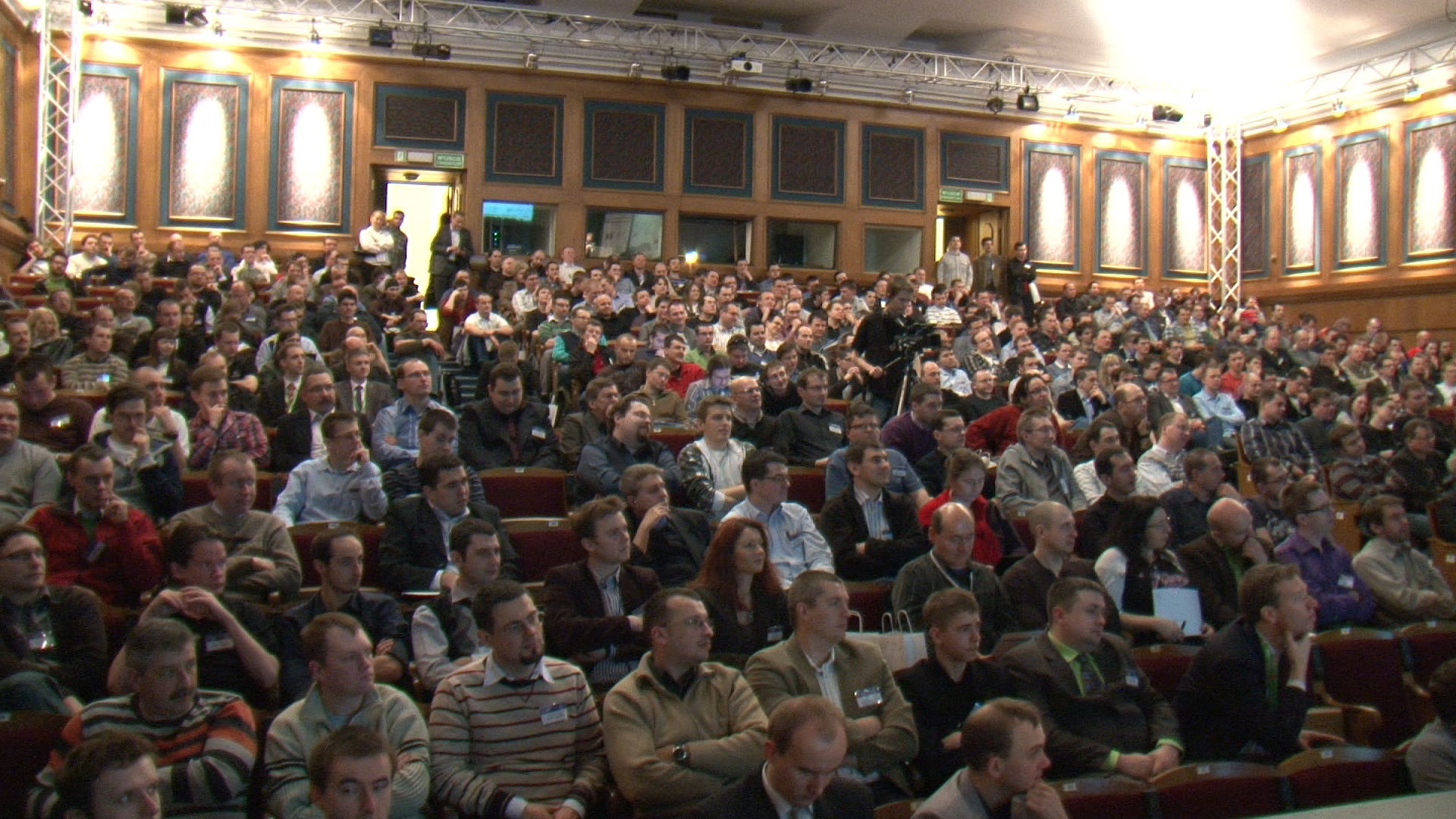
Nearly 500 attendees in the Main Hall during the 4th Open Source Day Conference in the Palace of Culture and Science in 2011

The 4th Open Source Day Conference followed on 22 March 2011 in the Palace of Culture and Science in Warsaw. 500-strong audience arrived. The organization of the event was a performed with the help of 11 technology vendors and service providers as well as 6 media partners. The conference was under the auspices of Ministry of Education. Opening keynotes were provided by Red Hat, EnterpriseDB and Zarafa Vice Presidents. Technical sessions presented latest news from the area of OS Linux, databases, ESB, scalability, monitoring and IT security.

=== Open Source Day 2012 ===
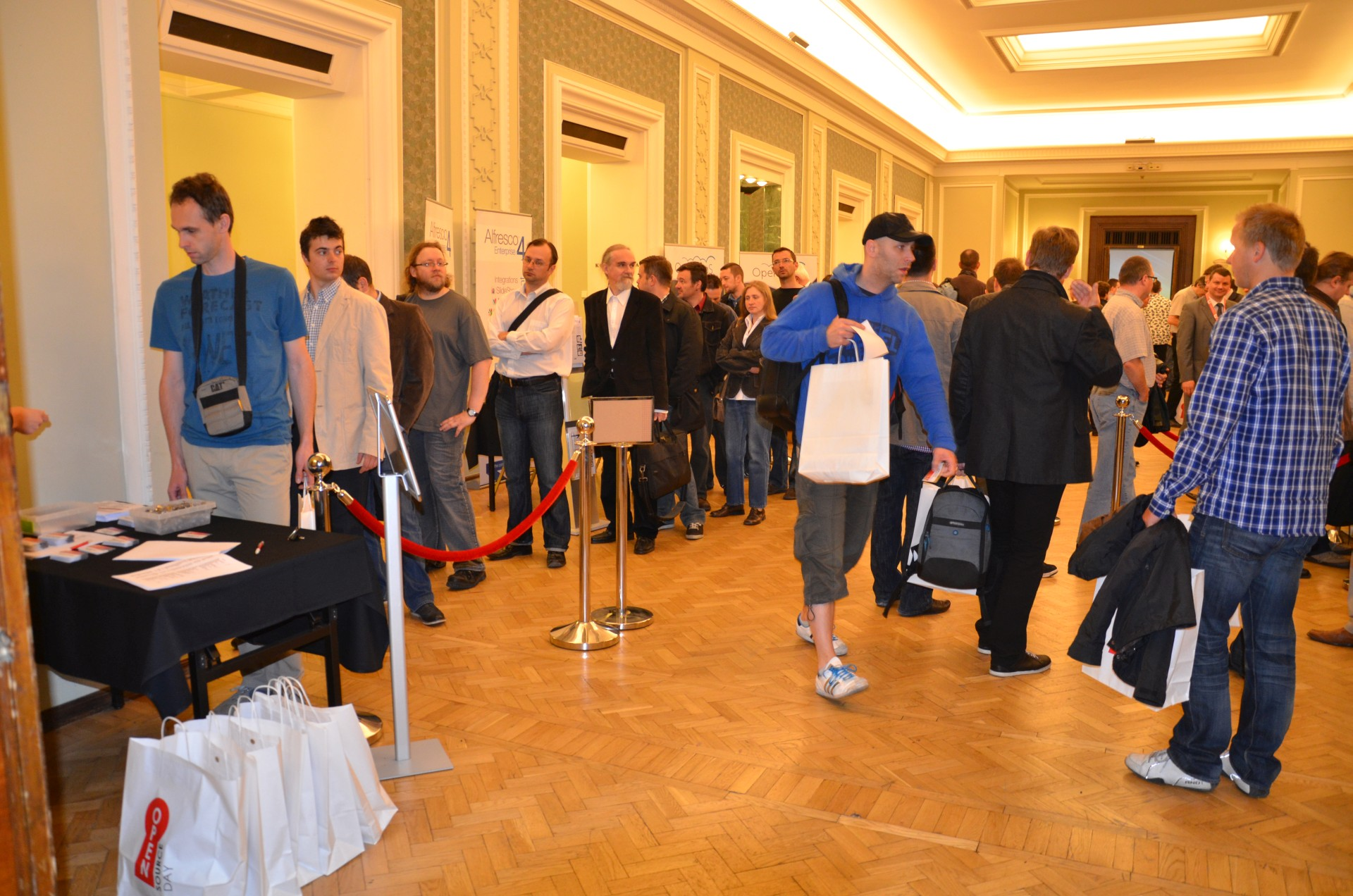
More than 500 attendees registered for the 5th Open Source Day Conference in Palace of Culture and Science in 2012

The 5th Open Source Day Conference took place on 8 May 2012 once again in the Palace of Culture and Science. More than 500 guests attended while 14 technology partners provided support to make the event happen. The conference performed under the auspices of the European Commission and Ministry of Administration and Digitization. Opening keynotes were introduced by the representatives of: European Commission, Hewlett Packard, Red Hat and Linux Polska. Technical sessions focused that year on: Enterprise Content Management. It was the first time Big data aspects were discussed, especially in terms of storage capabilities, distributed processing and caching and data virtualization.

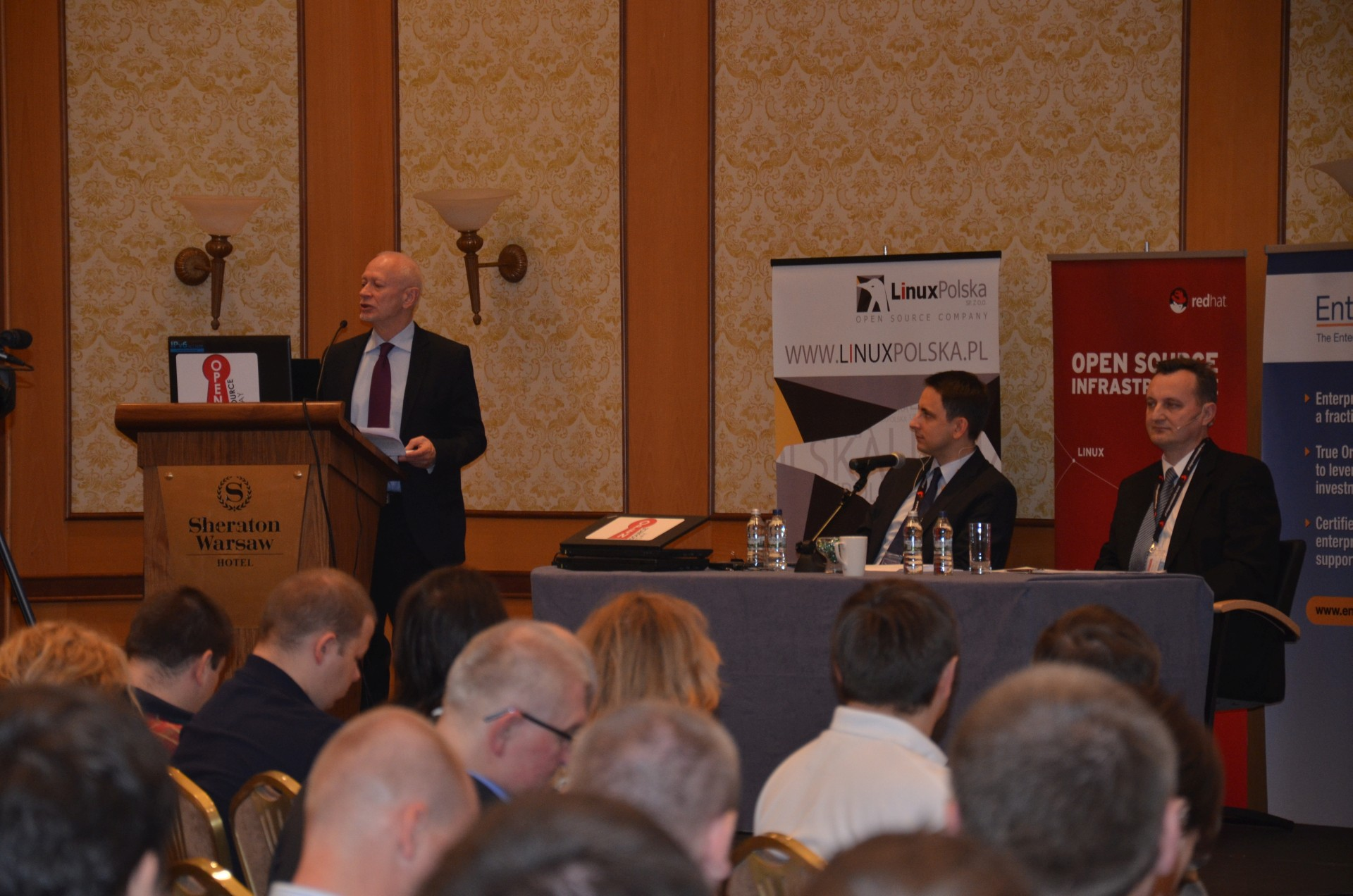
Polish Minister of Administration and Digitization, Michał Boni, having the opening keynote at the 6th Open Source Day Conference in Sheraton Warszawa

=== Open Source Day 2013 ===
The 6th Open Source Day Conference happened on 14 May 2013 this time in the Sheraton Warszawa hotel. 600 audience participated on-site while 1500 watched the event on-line. 9 technology partners supported the event while 5 media partners covered the proceedings. Polish Ministry of Administration and Digitization offered official patronage for the conference. The opening keynote was performed by Michał Boni, Minister of Administration and Digitization and covered the ever growing need for open standards and the opportunities Open Source is providing for Polish IT professionals and entrepreneurs.

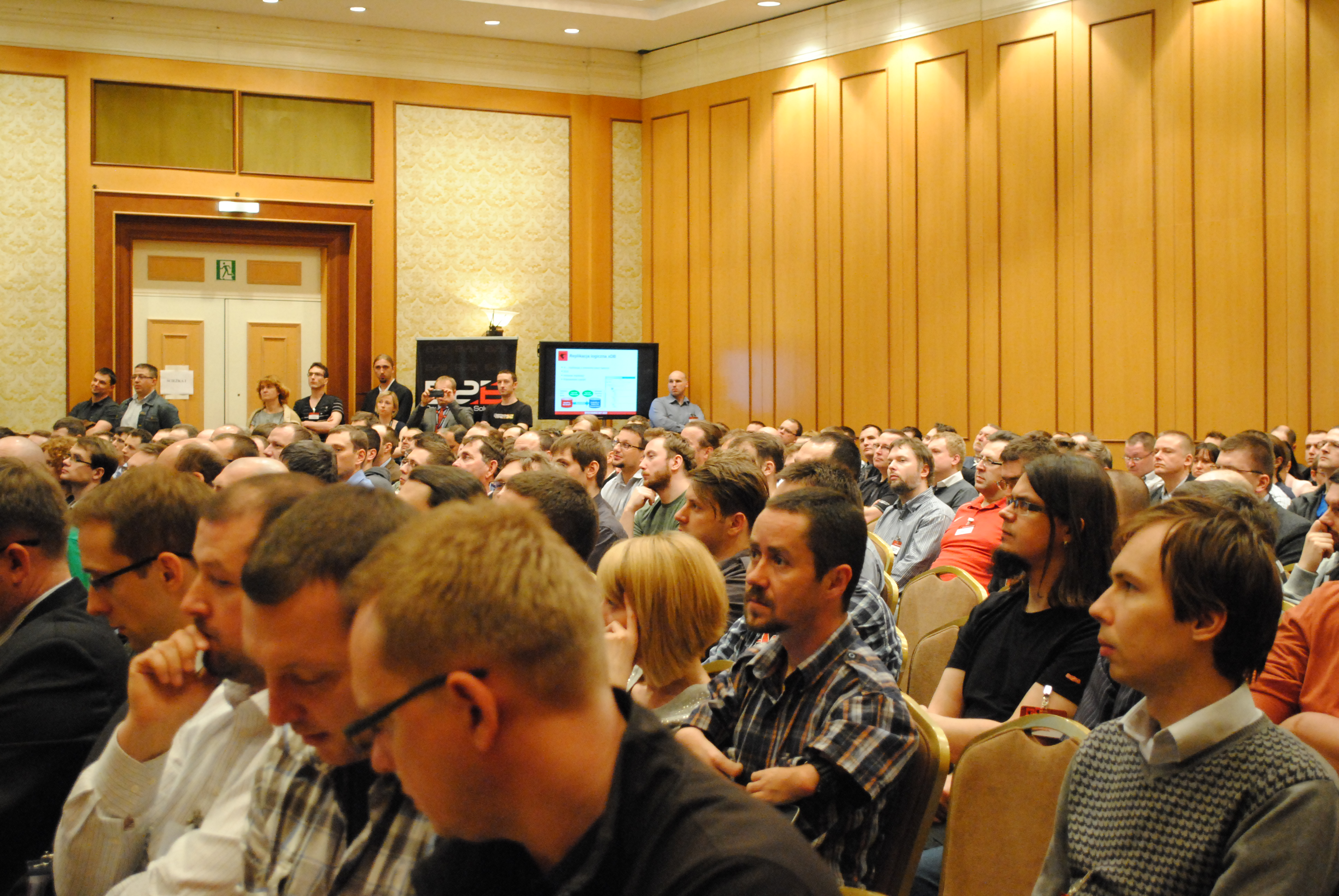
600 strong audience listening to a keynote session during the 6th Open Source Day

=== Open Source Day 2014 ===
The 7th edition of the conference was a 2-day event on 13–14 May 2014 in Marriott Warszawa Hotel. 20 IT vendors and service providers help in organization, providing financing and content while 10 media partners offer news coverage.

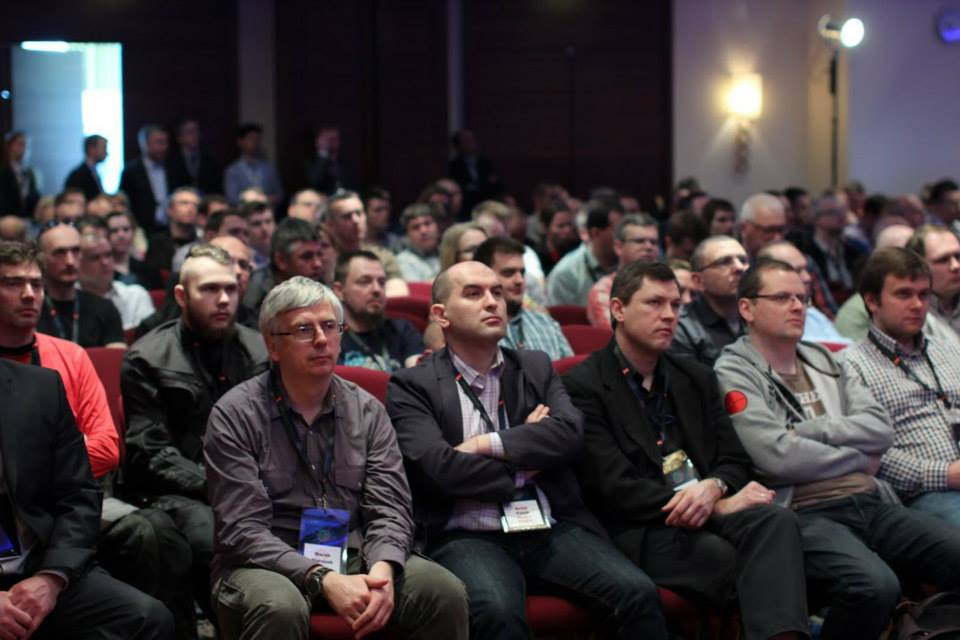
More than 700 attendees listening to keynotes on the opening session of the Open Source 2014 Day in Warsaw

The agenda covers 29 keynotes and lectures, 1 panel discussion and 6 bring your own device (BYOD) workshops.

More than 700 attendees participated while 3000 watched the proceedings online.

=== Open Source Day 2015 ===
The 8th edition of the conference was held on 23 April 2015 in the Marriott Warsaw. The conference will be performed under the auspices of the Polish Ministry of Administration and Digitization. 16 IT vendors helped in the organization of the event, providing financing and content, while 17 media partners provided news coverage. The agenda covered 17 keynotes and lectures as well as a discussion panel. Key topics of this edition were: Cloud, IT Infrastructure and IT Security.

=== Open Source Day 2016 ===
The 9th edition of the conference was held on 26 April 2016 in the Marriott Warsaw.

=== Open Source Day 2017 ===
The 10th anniversary edition of Open Source Day 2017 took place on May 17 at the Marriott Warsaw. The event was held under the honorary patronage of the Ministry of Digital Affairs and the National Center for Research and Development. Partners for the 10th edition included leading technology companies such as Red Hat, Google, Microsoft, SUSE, MySQL, Docker and EnterpriseDB. Media patrons included PC Format, Warsaw Business Journal, Linux.pl, OSworld.pl, ITwiz, Mamstartup.pl, and Magazyn Programista.

The special guest for the 10th edition was Dariusz Jemielniak, a professor of economic sciences and an expert in open collaboration, who has lectured at institutions such as Harvard University, the University of California, and the Massachusetts Institute of Technology. Representatives of leading global technology brands also spoke during the conference, discussing the crucial role of open source in the development of modern software.

The conference was opened by Dariusz Świąder, President of Linux Polska, who, together with Krzysztof Rocki, CEE Regional Director at Red Hat, summarized the 10 years of organizing the conference and its impact on the development of open-source software in Poland. Michael Isnard, Vice President of Red Hat EMEA, then spoke about supporting the digital transformation of businesses and shifting their architecture toward open-source technologies. Sascha Scholing, Sales Director at Docker, discussed the changing architecture of applications and the role of Docker containers in deploying applications in production. It is also worth mentioning the presentation by James Brayshaw, EMEA Sales Director at EnterpriseDB, who spoke about the advantages of open-source database solutions and the contribution of the Postgres community in developing holistic solutions, ready for deployment in large enterprises.

Furthermore, during the lectures, participants could learn about the role of individuals and communities in creating open technologies, as well as why companies that have previously relied on closed solutions are investing in open source. There were also topics dedicated to specific technological issues, such as how open source is improving public cloud services and how to manage a large number of servers in various architectures.

The conference agenda was complemented by technical workshops prepared by Linux Polska experts. In 2017, there were as many as 7 technical tracks on various topics, such as container orchestration with Docker Swarm and Compose, webSSO, container automation with Docker and Ansible, container orchestration with OpenShift, container orchestration with Kubernetes, JBoss on the OpenShift platform, and collecting and analyzing logs from containerized applications.

The 2017 Open Source Day edition gathered over 800 participants and around 3000 online viewers. More than 300 people took part in the technology workshops led by Linux Polska experts.

=== Open Source Day 2018 ===
The 11th edition of Open Source Day took place on May 23 at the Marriott Warsaw and gathered over 800 participants. The honorary patrons of the Open Source Day 2018 conference were the Ministry of Investment and Development, the Ministry of Entrepreneurship and Technology, and the National Center for Research and Development. Companies such as Red Hat, EnterpriseDB, Oracle, Zabbix, Emca, and MySQL joined the group of partners for the 11th edition of the event.

In turn, media patronage for the event was provided by editorial teams of TOK FM, Warsaw Business Journal, Magazyn Programista, ITWiZ, IT Reseller, Reseller News, Mamstartup.pl, and Dziennik Internautów.

The event was inaugurated by the President of Linux Polska - Dariusz Świąder, accompanied by Krzysztof Rocki, Senior Regional Manager CEE at Red Hat. Immediately afterwards, a special guest – Krzysztof Dyki, Member of the Board of ZUS supervising the Operations and Systems Exploitation Division, spoke about the potential of Open Source solutions in the public sector, using the example of the institution he represents. The next item on the agenda was a keynote session titled "Your Future is Built on What You Do Today". The host of this session was Werner Knoblich, Senior Vice President and General Manager, Red Hat, EMEA.

The culmination of the main part of the conference was the presentation of awards for innovative use of Open Source technology in the public and enterprise sectors. Winners:

- Orange Polska – award for the most innovative use of open source technology in the enterprise sector in 2017. The statuette was received by Tomasz Matuła - Director of ICT Infrastructure and Cybersecurity at Orange Polska.
- Agency for Restructuring and Modernization of Agriculture – award for the most innovative use of Open Source technology and containerization in the public sector in 2017. The statuette was received by Marek Deutsch - Deputy President of the Agency for Restructuring and Modernization of Agriculture.

What distinguished Open Source Day in 2018 was the particular emphasis on sharing knowledge in the form of practical technical sessions. Conference participants could choose from 18 technical sessions conducted within 7 thematic blocks: DevOps and Automation, Security, Application and Development, Data Science, IoT, Machine Learning and Artificial Intelligence, Monitoring, Management, Compliance, Database, Education.

Among them, there were, of course, workshops conducted by Linux Polska experts:

- Ansible under Windows
- Selected aspects of the continuous software delivery process on the OpenShift platform
- Overview of Red Hat OpenShift platform security issues
- SSO available on the Red Hat OpenShift platform
- Internet of Things and all-data analysis
- Deep learning in image analysis and Data Science tools in containers
- Satellite Server, IPA
- EDB Failover Manager in action

=== Open Source Day 2019 ===
The 12th edition of Open Source Day took place on May 14, 2019, at the Józef Piłsudski Legia Stadium. The conference was supported by the honorary patronage of the Ministry of Digital Affairs, the Ministry of Investment and Development, the Ministry of Entrepreneurship and Technology, and the National Center for Research and Development. Meanwhile, the media patrons of Open Source Day 2019 included the editorial offices of TOK FM, Warsaw Business Journal, Infor.pl, Egospodarka.pl, PC Format, CD Action, Magazyn Programista, ITWiZ, IT Reseller, Dziennik Internautów, OSworld.pl, Linux.pl, and Linux Magazine Polska.

Among the partners of the 12th edition were companies such as Red Hat, EnterpriseDB, Microsoft, MySQL, Oracle, Sysdig, Zabbix, and Aplitt.

The conference was opened by Dariusz Świąder, President of Linux Polska. Among the keynote speakers were, among others, Adam Wojtkowski, Regional General Manager CEE at Red Hat, and Jan Karremans, Director of Sales Engineering EMEA at EnterpriseDB.

Participants of the 12th edition of OSD had 9 technical sessions divided into 3 thematic blocks, dedicated to the most important and current directions of IT industry development. Among the discussed topics were subjects such as: containerization, automation, virtualization, cloud computing, security and monitoring of IT infrastructure, and the development of Open Source software.

Traditionally, the conference program also included technical workshops led by the best industry experts. The organizers of the meeting, representatives of Linux Polska, keynote speakers, and invited guests all agreed on one issue – Open Source technology is the engine of global economic development, but open solutions are increasingly becoming an essential element in the development of Polish enterprises.

== See also ==
- List of free-software events
