= Mohamed Ali Al-Shaaban =

Bahraini physician and television personality

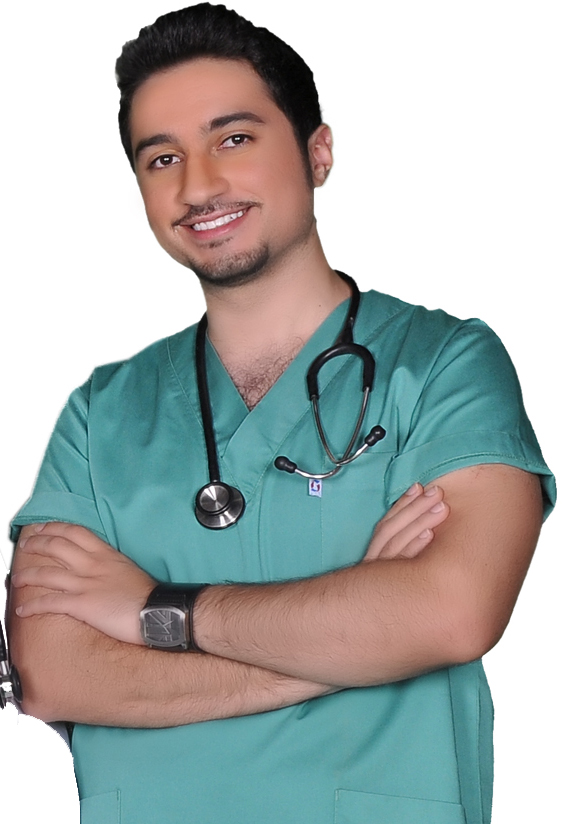
- Mohamed Ali Al-Shaaban
- Born: Mohamed Ali Al-Shaaban; November 5, 1986; Manama, Bahrain
- Education: Arabian Gulf University (MD)
- Employer: Bahraini Ministry of Health

Mohamed Ali Al-Shaaban (Arabic: محمد علي الشعبان), born in Manama on November 5, 1986, is a Bahraini Radio and Television personality and a surgical resident at the Ministry of Health in the Kingdom of Bahrain. He has already received an MD degree from the Arabian Gulf University in Bahrain in 2009, was granted a BSc in Medical Research from the University of Manitoba in Canada in 2006 for his research, and has been listed as one of the top 20 leading youth in Bahrain in 2007.

Al-Shaaban's aspirations won him two regional awards for best scientific research in 2006 and in 2009. His research about AKAPs association with cardiac hypertrophy lead to the publication of 2 articles in the Journal of Molecular and Cellular Cardiology in 2007 and 2009.

He also served as a guest speaker in the first world MaPS symposium in Malta in 2005, following a conducted research about the relationship triad between physicians, nurses, and pharmacists at Salmaniya Medical Complex in Bahrain.

During his years of medical education, Al Shaaban was a founding member of the International Federation of Medical Students Association, Bahrain, serving as the first National Exchange officer for two years and establishing numerous exchange contracts with Germany, the Netherlands, Canada, Poland, and Britain. He was later voted as Secretary General of the association. His achievements included being a part of a worldwide petition letter asking for more transparency in the WHO director general election process.

Al-Shaaban began his educational career at Naseem International School in Bahrain, from which he graduated top of class in 2003 and was granted the International Baccalaureate Diploma.

Medicine aside, Al-Shaaban has been a newscaster on Radio Bahrain 96.5 FM (the local English Radio Station) since 2006. a few months later he was employed by the local Bahrain TV Channel 2 as an anchorman and a reporter.

Al-Shaaban's ambitions pushed him to be nominated as the stations correspondent at the GCC Summit in 2008 and 2009, in the Sultanate of Oman and State of Kuwait respectively. He is also involved in a number of programs and special coverages.

Al-Shaaban's latest achievement was a tangible mix of his two careers that translated into the launch of his medical show "Healthy Minutes" which kicked off in January 2010. The show is currently airing on Bahrain Television.

== See also ==
- International Pharmaceutical Students' Federation
- IFMSA
- Bahrain Radio and Television Corporation
- Arabian Gulf University
