= WBJ =

WBJ or wbj may refer to:

- Warsaw Business Journal, an English-language weekly newspaper based in Warsaw, Poland
- wbj, the ISO 639-3 code for Alagwa language, Tanzania
