= Gelato (disambiguation) =

Gelato is a style of ice cream from Italy.

Gelato may also refer to:

- Gelato (mixtape), 2017, by rapper Young Dolph
- Gelato (software), a graphics rendering program
- Gelato Federation, a 2001–2009 coalition supporting Linux on the Itanium architecture
- Ray Gelato (Ray Keith Irwin, born 1961), British jazz, swing and jump blues musician
