= Promwad =

Independent electronics design house

Promwad Electronics Design House
- Type: Private
- Industry: Electronics
- Founded: 2004
- Founder: Roman Pakholkov
- Headquarters: Essen, Germany
- Area served: EU, Canada, United States
- Services: engineering, software development, electronics manufacturing services
- Number of employees: >100
- Website: www.promwad.com www.promwad.de

Promwad is an independent electronics design house in Eastern Europe headquartered in Essen, Germany. It is engaged in contract electronics design, software development and contract manufacturing for customers in Europe and America.

The company received media attention for some of its software and hardware designs for video streaming and digital TV, telecom, automotive, IoT and industrial automation.

== History ==
Roman Pakholkov founded Promwad in 2004 to design mass-produced electronics devices based on System on a chip (SoC) and Linux. The company started operating from Minsk, Belarus, and gradually moved its business portfolio to the European Union. In 2016, Promwad opened an office in Vilnius. In 2021, the company delivery office was opened in Germany, and a development centre opened in Latvia.

== Partners ==
In 2024, Promwad began a collaboration with Hilscher, a German provider of industrial communication technologies. The companies jointly work on a universal robotics and industrial communications platform based on the Hilscher netx network controller.

== See also ==
- Monimoto
- Vinted
