= Community Over Code =

Open source software convention

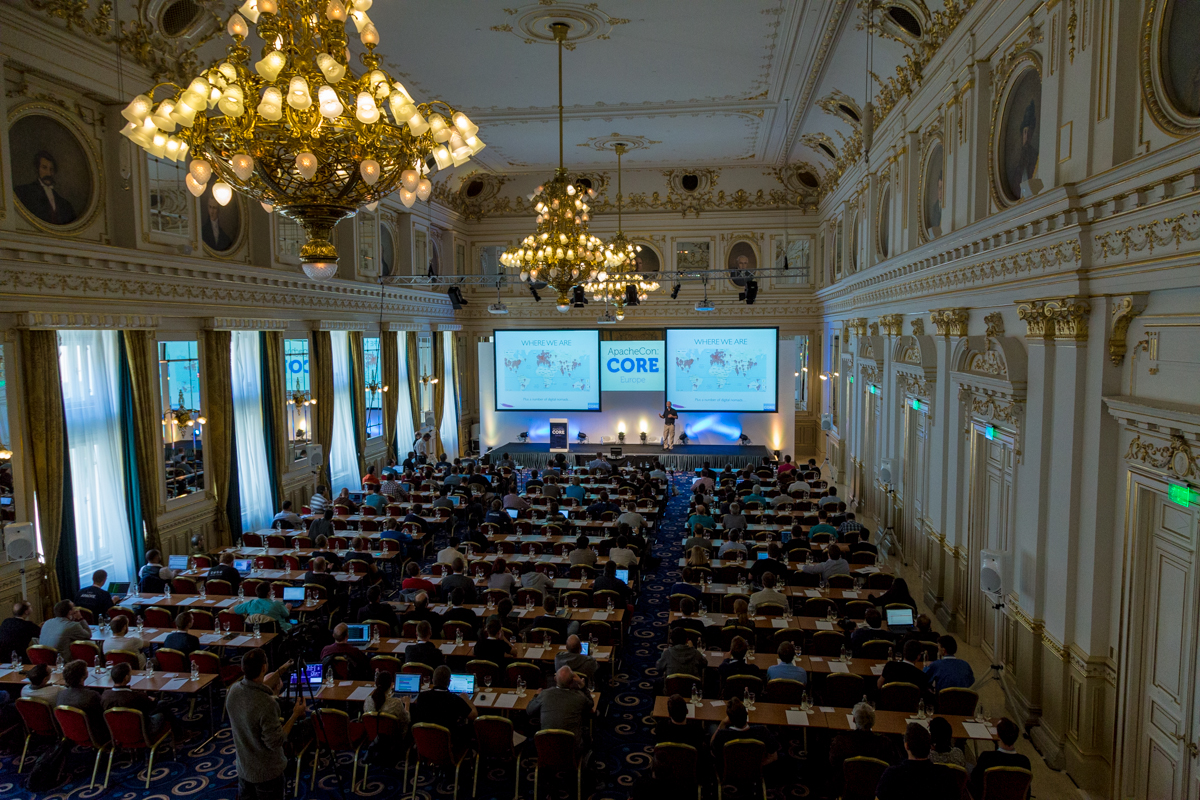
- ApacheCon:Core Europe 2015
- Genre: Free-software event
- Inaugurated: 1998
- Organiser: Apache Software Foundation
- Old name: ApacheCon

Community Over Code (formerly known as the ApacheCon until March 2023) is the official open source software convention of the Apache Software Foundation, focused on the software projects hosted at the ASF, as well as on the development and governance philosophies of the ASF. In the early years the event was primarily about Apache HTTP Server, but as the Foundation grew, this expanded to encompass all Apache Software Foundation projects.

The event was first held in 1998, before the official founding of the Apache Software Foundation, in San Francisco, California.

Since then, the event has been held annually in North America, and frequently in Europe, too. The first convention hosted outside of North America was ApacheCon Asia in 2006.

The 2020 event was held online, and had more than 5000 registrations, from all over the world. It featured 25 tracks, hosted by the various software projects and communities within the Foundation. More typical in-person event attendance is in the 500-700 range.

Community Over Code's goals are education about ASF's projects and processes, and building the communities around those projects. Tracks are hosted by the projects themselves, or groups of related projects. The event always features the "State of the Feather" annual report of the Foundation.

The Apache Software Foundation also hosts a number of smaller events, called Apache Roadshows which are typically more regional, one or two day events.

== See also ==
- List of free-software events
