= Chemnitz Linux Days =

Coordinates: 50°48′48″N 12°55′45″E

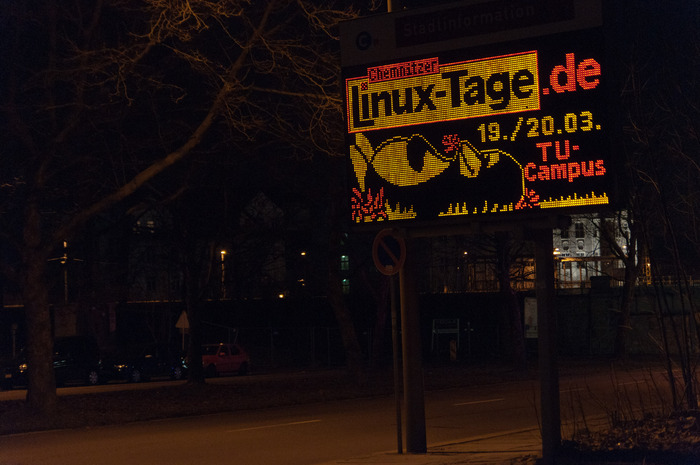
Sign for Chemnitz Linux Days

The Chemnitz Linux Days (German: Chemnitzer Linux-Tage) are an annual event focusing on Linux and free (libre) software in general. It takes place in the auditory and seminar building of Chemnitz University of Technology (German: Technische Universität Chemnitz / TU Chemnitz) in the federal state of Saxony, in the south-east of Germany. There are talks, project booths (both by community projects and by enterprises in the FOSS market), workshops, install parties, child care and playful educational lectures for the younger visitors, as well as technical help desks (Doctor Tux office). Both talks and workshops are held in German; some are also held in English, and they cover a broad variety of topics for professionals as well as entry-level visitors.

== History ==
The first CLT took place in 1999 – a single-day event with several talks and an install party. It was attended by about 700 visitors. Since 2000 the CLT have been established as a weekend event in the first two weeks of March. The event is organized mainly by (former) students and employees of Chemnitz University of Technology, especially members of the faculty of mathematics and informatics / computer studies. Furthermore, members of Chemnitz LUG (Linux user group, part of IN Chemnitz e.V.), on whose initiative the CLT were founded, take an active part in the process, as well as external members from all around Europe. In 2017, CLT decided to sponsor two Humboldt penguins.

The structure of organization is relatively casual and is characterized by low hierarchy levels – as typical of many FOSS community projects. The cast of people for certain tasks is in a flow, and tasks themselves are changing in the course of time. The core team consists of about eight members who are concerned with and preparing the annual event. Between September and March the staff count rises to about 30 members, and different teams are formed for dealing with the variety of topics (such as call for papers and lectures; catering; security; tech behind the scenes; child care; public relations and more). During the event itself the whole staff is composed of core and preparation team, as well as freelance helpers and lecturers, and it counts from about 300 to 350 people. Besides all those presentations, workshops and booth areas there is a big majority of assistants, busily dealing with logistics, information service, catering, childcare, security.

== Specific features ==
The CLT offer a diversified program for a broad audience. In addition to talks / lectures and workshops for beginners, advanced users and experts, there are workshops for practical experience and experiments. In the booth area, community projects as well as enterprises present themselves and invite visitors to talks and discussion. Furthermore, "Doctor Tux’ office" provides all sorts of service around Linux installation and answers questions concerning technical problems with systems and portable devices people have brought with them.

Attendance consists mostly of pupils, students, and home users with an interest in Linux and free-as-in-freedom software. The event caters to a range of ages and levels of experience. Attendees can expect to meet with representatives of enterprises or public services, who's discussions and presentations span a wide variety of topics.

Since 2005, most of the lectures have been streamed (audio, since 2009 also video) to the Internet for a remote audience. The local university's Radio UNiCC and the professorship of media informatics (Medieninformatik) have come to support the event. Most talks, if given permission by the speakers, may be downloaded afterwards for later viewing (usually CC license).

With a couple of workshops that are targeted specifically towards children and adolescent people, the organizers offer do-it-yourself tinkering and all kinds of creative doing.

== Statistics ==
| No. | Year | Date | Visitors | Lectures | Workshops | Link |
|---|---|---|---|---|---|---|
| 1. | 1999 | March 6 | 700 | 20 | none but install party | 1999 |
| 2. | 2000 | March 11–12 | 1000 | 23 | 1 (see Saturday / installation) | 2000 |
| 3. | 2001 | March 10–11 | 1200 | 40 | 1 (see Saturday afternoon) | 2001 |
| 4. | 2002 | March 9–10 | 1500 | 51 | 7 | 2002 |
| 5. | 2003 | March 1–2 | 1800 | 52 | 8 | 2003 |
| 6. | 2004 | March 6–7 | 2500 | 57 | 10 | 2004 |
| 7. | 2005 | March 5–6 | 2500 | 80 | 12 | 2005 |
| 8. | 2006 | March 4–5 | 2500 | 81 | 12 | 2006 |
| 9. | 2007 | March 3–4 | 2700 | 95 | 15 | 2007 |
| 10. | 2008 | March 1–2 | 2400 | 87 | 13 | 2008 |
| 11. | 2009 | March 14–15 | 2600 | 95 | 14 | 2009 |
| 12. | 2010 | March 13–14 | 2600 | 91 | 15 | 2010 |
| 13. | 2011 | March 19–20 | 2400 | 88 | 15 | 2011 |
| 14. | 2012 | March 17–18 | 2400 | 89 | 15 | 2012 |
| 15. | 2013 | March 16–17 | 2300 | 92 | 13 | 2013 |
| 16. | 2014 | March 15–16 | 2600 | 90 | 14 | 2014 |
| 17. | 2015 | March 21–22 | 3160 | 90 | 14 (+5 CLT Junior (German)) | 2015 |
| 18. | 2016 | March 19–20 | 3100 | 88 (+12 Lightning-Talks) | 9 (+7 CLT Junior (German)) | 2016 |
| 19. | 2017 | March 11–12 | 3200 | 88 (+15 Lightning-Talks) | 12 (+8 CLT Junior (German)) | 2017 |
| 20. | 2018 | March 10–11 | 3400 | ~100 (+7 Lightning-Talks) | 12 (+7 CLT junior (German)) | 2018 |
| 21. | 2019 | March 16–17 | 3600 | 86 (+11 Lightning-Talks) | 29 (+8 CLT junior (German)) | 2019 |
| 22. | (2020 ^{[1]}) | | | | | |
| 23. | 2021 (online) | March 13–14 | 2900 ^{[2]} | ~80 (^{[3]}) | 13 (+3 CLT junior (German)) | 2021 |
| 24. | 2022 | March 12–13 | online | | | 2022 |
| 25. | 2023 | March 11–12 | 3000 | 86 | 9 (+5 CLT junior) | 2023 |
| 26. | 2024 | March 16–17 | 3200 | 97 | 10(+8 CLT Junior) | 2024 |
| 27. | 2025 | March 22–23 | 3500 | | | 2025 |
| 28. | 2026 | March 28–29 | 3500 | 105 | 14(+7 CLT Junior) | 2026 |

[1] 2020 did not take place (canceled on short notice due to COVID 19 reaching Germany / lockdown)
[2] 2021: attendees estimated, not comparable to prev. years (online vs. real-world, different methods of counting)
[3] 2021: additionally some smaller onlive events around, work adventure,...

== See also ==
- former LinuxTag in Berlin
- FrOSCon near Bonn
- List of free-software events
