= True Fruits =

German company

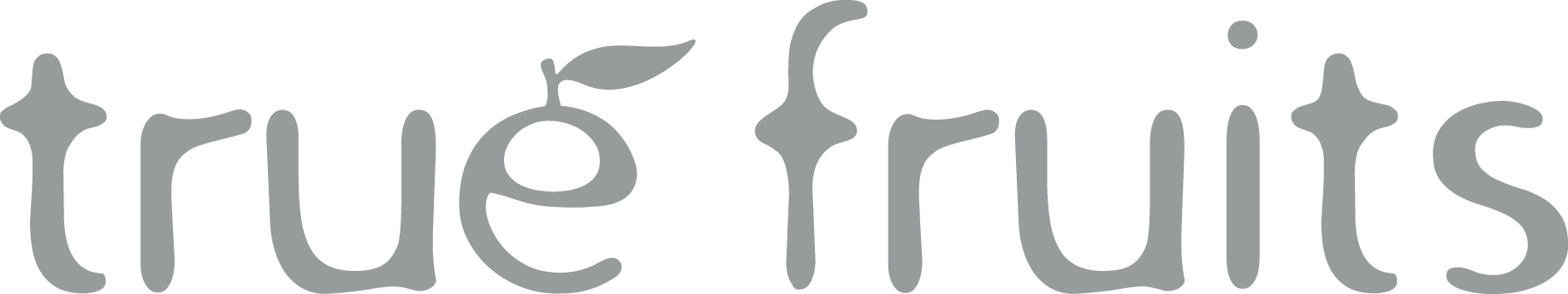
- Type: GmbH
- Industry: Beverages
- Founded: 2006
- Headquarters: Bonn, North Rhine-Westphalia
- Key people: Marco Knauf; Inga Koster; Nicolas Lecloux (founders and managing directors)
- Revenue: ca. €62 million (2022)
- Number of employees: 35 (2022)
- Website: www.true-fruits.com

True Fruits (own spelling: true fruits) is a German supplier of smoothies, ginger shots and other shots. Following its foundation in 2006, the company popularized the smoothie in Germany and is the market leader for smoothies in Germany. The company is based in Bonn and had a revenue of around €62 million in 2022.

== History ==
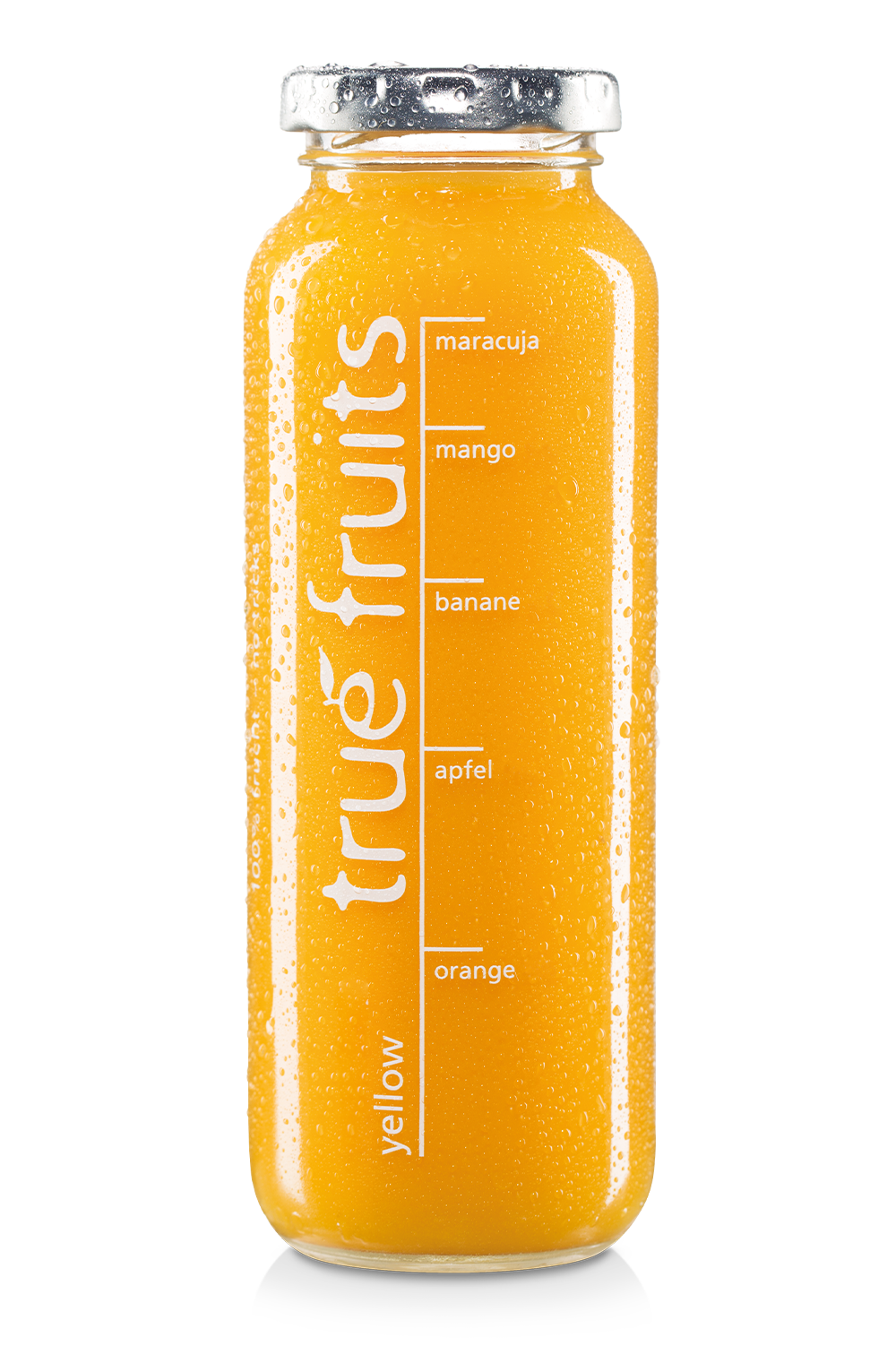
True Fruits smoothie

In 2005, German students Nicolas Lecloux, Marco Knauf and Inga Koster came into contact with smoothies during a semester abroad in Aberdeen, Scotland. While smoothies were popular in the United Kingdom, they were still largely unknown in Germany at the time. The three students then started a research project at the Hochschule Bonn-Rhein-Sieg University of Applied Sciences on the production and distribution of smoothies on the German market.

After developing the first smoothie recipes, the three founders entered into a cooperation with Streker Natursaft GmbH from Aspach in Baden-Württemberg for the production and filling of the bottles. An entrepreneur from Bonn became aware of them after they won second place in a competition with a business plan that they developed as part of their diploma thesis. Through contributions from the entrepreneur, an additional investor, and a KfW loan, Koster, Knauf and Lecloux secured a total start-up capital of €250,000.

The three then founded True Fruits GmbH in June 2006. In November of the same year, they launched four smoothies on the market. By 2007, the smoothies were also sold in Austria, Luxembourg and Switzerland. In 2020 and 2021, the company also expanded into Spain and France.

True Fruits has become one of the market leaders in the smoothie segment in Germany and has, as of 2023, a market share of over 70 percent on the German market. In 2018, the Eckes-Granini Group took over 35% of True Fruits.

== Company structure ==
In 2022, True Fruits generated sales of around €62 million, an increase on the previous year's sales of €55 million. The founders Marco Knauf, Inga Koster and Nicolas Lecloux are serving as managing directors of True Fruits. The company is based in Bonn, and in 2022 True Fruits GmbH employed an average of 35 people directly. The drinks are bottled externally at W. Streker Natursaft GmbH in Baden-Württemberg.

== Products ==
True Fruits distributes their products in Germany, Austria, Luxembourg, France, Spain, and Switzerland. The smoothies are available in 250ml and 750ml bottles. In 2020, two different ginger shots were launched in the 99ml size. In 2023, the range was expanded to include the brands "Smoothie violet", "Vitamin B Shot" and "Ginger Shot". The "Electrolyte Shot” followed in 2024.

All products have been produced vegan since 2009. The company does not use stabilizers, colourings, preservatives or added sugar.

Since 2010, the company has regularly launched limited editions of its bottles, which feature a special design. In addition to the limited editions in the bottle design, there are also limited editions in terms of taste and the season of the year.

== Controversies and marketing ==
The company has used provocative advertising themes for many years, which have occasionally faced criticism for being racist or sexist. According to Vision Magazin, humorous or provocative advertising is used to gain media attention for True Fruits. Nicolas Lecloux, the head of Marketing at True Fruits, stated in an interview that True Fruits understood that "marketing is entertainment". The company's marketing strategy is frequently the subject of media coverage.

An exemplary controversy arose in 2015 over a bottle text in which a white smoothie from the company, which was described as tasty but unimpressive-looking, was compared on the bottle text to an "ugly friend who is totally nice". Ahead of the 2021 German federal election, True Fruits printed excerpts from the election programs of all the parties represented in the Bundestag on some of its bottles. According to True Fruits, the aim of the campaign was to draw attention to the upcoming federal election. The Edeka retail chain returned those bottles which featured the right-wing populist AfD, which was widely discussed in Germany. True Fruits accused Edeka of "embarrassing social signalling" for this step.

== Awards (selection) ==
- 2007: iF Product Design Award in the category "Glass bottle packaging"
- 2009: Red Dot for the packaging design
- 2009: Deutscher Gründerpreis (German Founders' Prize) in the category Startup company
- 2013: German Design Award in the category "Communication Tools"
- 2013: Cannes Lion in bronze
- 2015: German Design Award in the category "Excellent Product Design – Kitchen"
