= Budapest Business Journal =

Hungarian business magazine

- Categories: Business magazine
- Frequency: Biweekly
- Publisher: Absolute Media
- First issue: 1 November 1992; 32 years ago
- Country: Hungary
- Based in: Budapest
- Language: English
- Website: Budapest Business Journal

The Budapest Business Journal or BBJ is a biweekly business magazine published in Hungary. It is the largest, oldest and a leading publication in its category in the country.

== History and profile ==
The BBJ was launched in November 1992 as a weekly. The magazine, based in Budapest, was converted into biweekly later. It was founded by a US-owned company headed by Stephen A. O'Connor, an American media entrepreneur. Mike Stone was also its founder.

The publisher is Absolut Media Kft. It was originally published by New World Publishing which also published the Warsaw Business Journal in Poland and the Prague Business Journal in Czechoslovakia (and later the Czech Republic) until January 2004.

As its title implies, the BBJ exclusively focuses on business news and related analysis, targeting business professionals. In addition, it provides detailed industry and company information. The magazine publishes rankings of Hungarian companies each year in a separate publication called The Book of Lists.

The BBJ was one of the independent publications and provided investigative reports in the late 1990s. In 2002, the BBJ had a circulation of 8,700 copies.

The BBJ has a website which is one of the leading business information websites in the country. As of 15 May 2013, the Alexa rank of the website was 858437.

== See also ==
- List of magazines in Hungary
