= Linux Vacation / Eastern Europe =

- Genre: Free and open-source software development conference
- Location: Grodno
- Country: Belarus
- Inaugurated: 2005
- Website: lvee.org

Linux Vacation / Eastern Europe (LVEE) is an annual international conference of developers and users of free and open source software. It takes place in the end of June – beginning of July in Belarus, near the Grodno city.

The event is aimed at combining both professional communication and leisure activities for the free software professionals and enthusiasts. LVEE organizers are Minsk Linux Users Group and open source community active members from Grodno and Brest. Recommended languages are Belarusian, English and Russian.

== History ==
The first LVEE conference took place in 2005. It was inspired by a Russian LinuxFest event, after the large Minsk delegation had taken part in it in 2004. This visit resulted in a decision to organise a similar event in a slightly more official setting for free software enthusiasts and professionals from Belarus and neighbouring countries. The format of LVEE includes presentations and lightning talks as well as workshops and round table discussions.

Currently LVEE is the only general-topic open source conference held in Belarus (according to interview with the conference organisers and claims on its official website). Despite its historically formed naming, conference is not limited to the Linux operating system, but also covers a wide range of platforms: from workstations and servers to embedded systems and mobile devices. The presentation topics are normally focused on the design, development, and maintenance of free software, adoption and administration of FOSS-based solutions, making business based on open technologies, licensing, legal and policy issues.

The conference has been sponsored by Belarusian and foreign IT companies involved with open source projects and communities: Altoros, Collabora, EPAM Systems, Promwad, SaM Solutions, etc.

== Photos ==
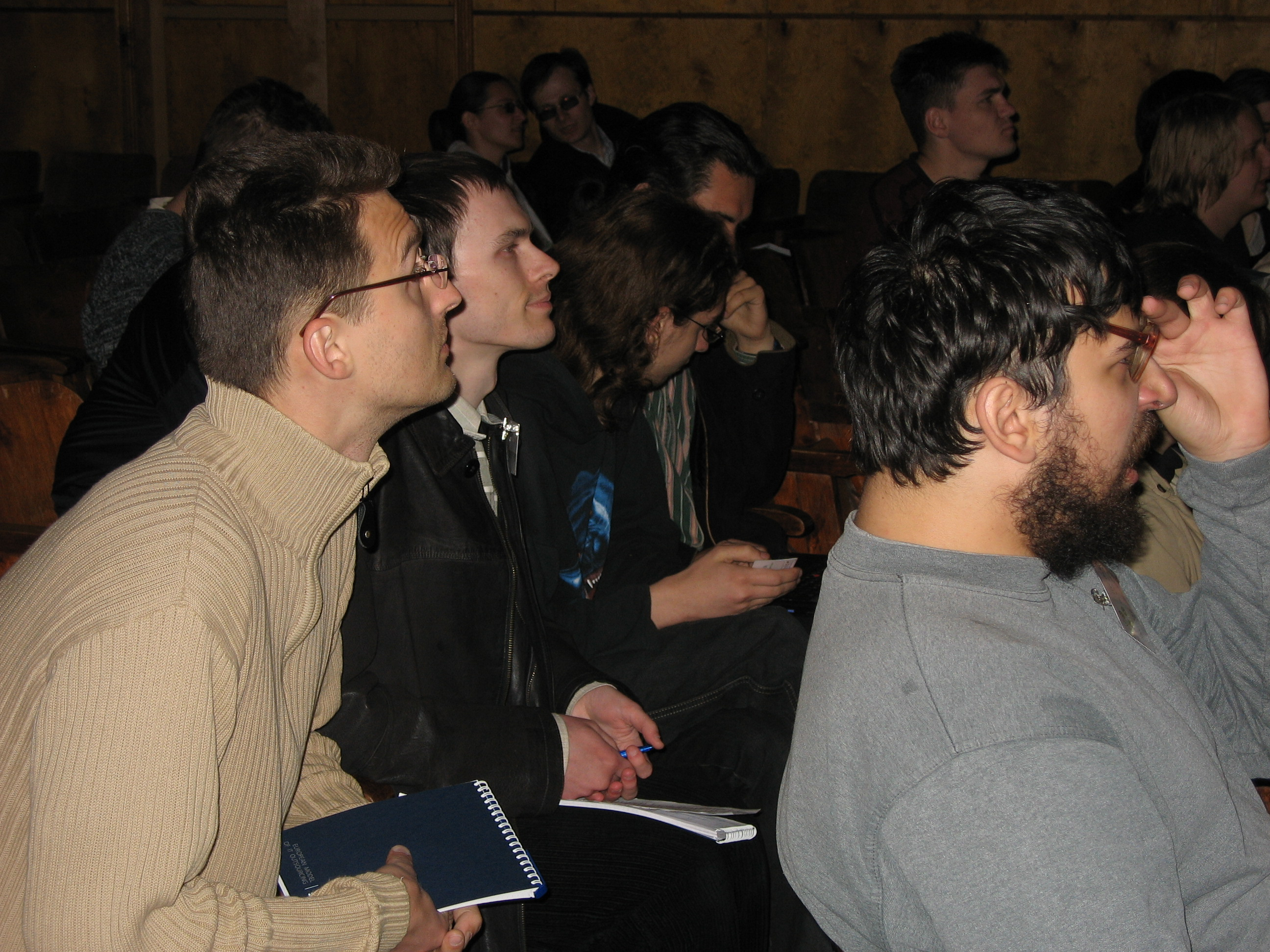
In the conference hall (2006)

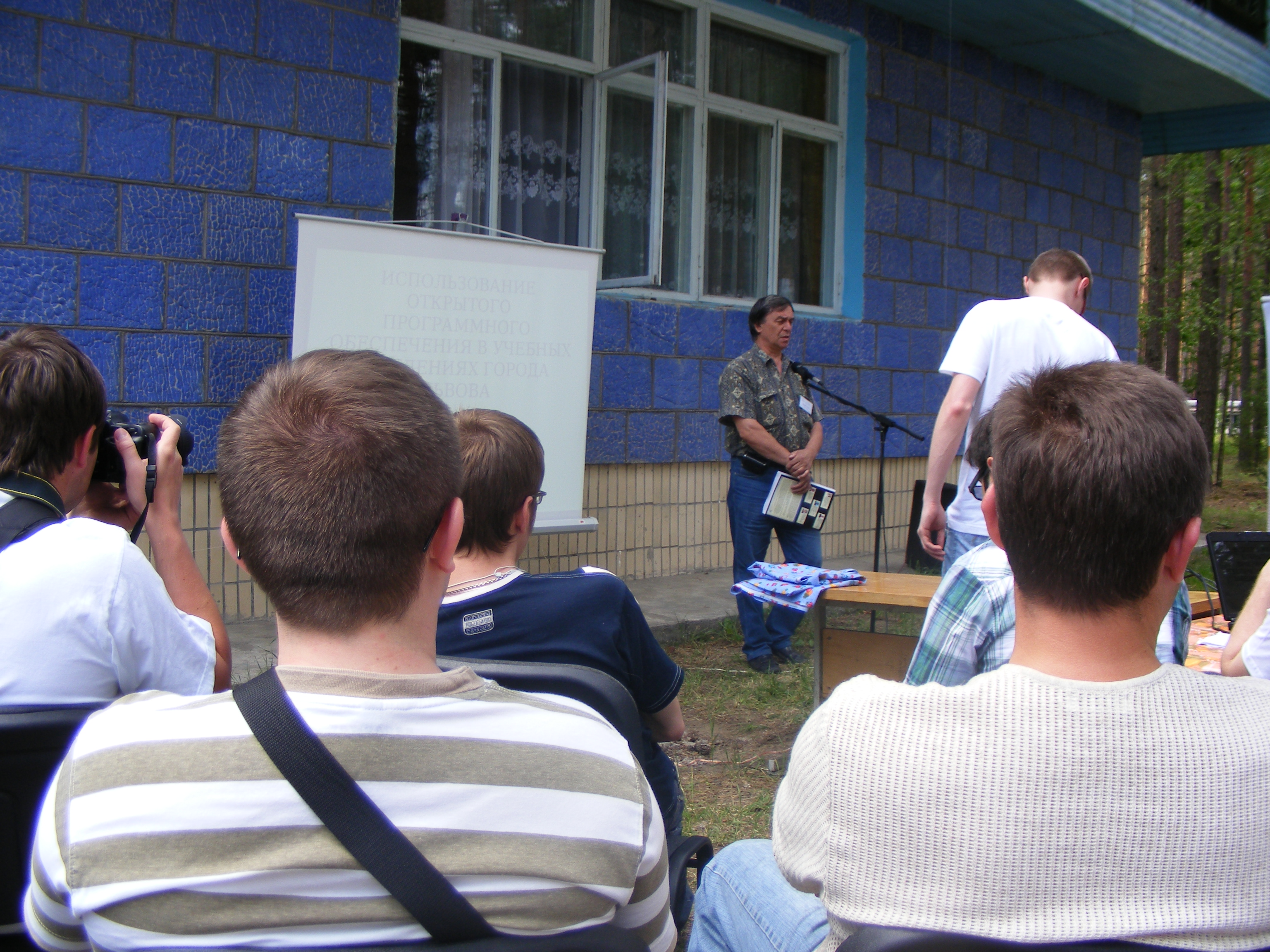
Workshop speech (2008)

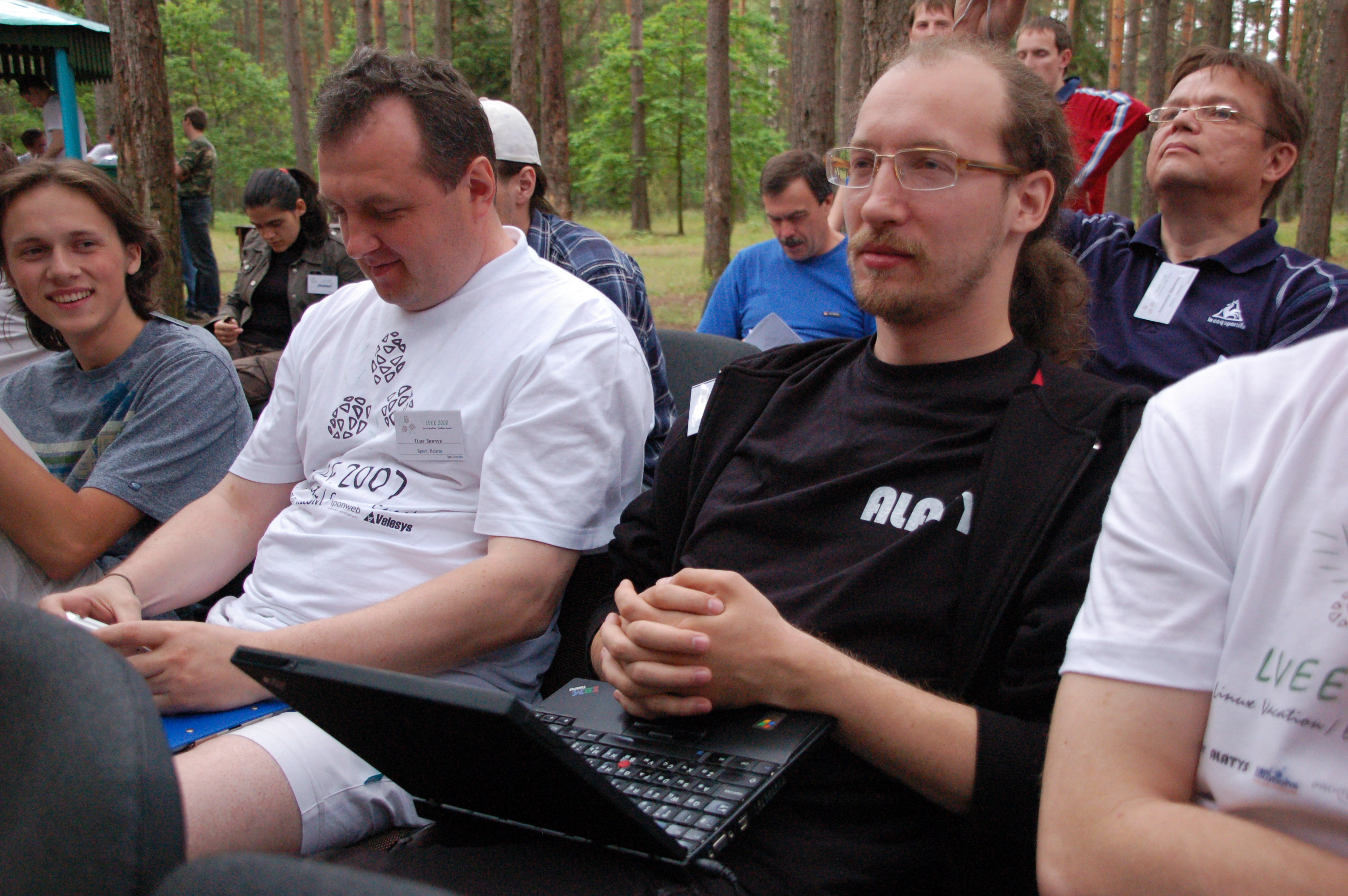
Conference participants (2008)
