= DevConf.cz =

- Location: Brno (Czech Republic)
- Website: www.devconf.info/cz/

DevConf.cz (Developer Conference) is an annual, free, Red Hat sponsored community conference for developers, admins, DevOps engineers, testers, documentation writers and other contributors to open source technologies. The conference includes topics on Linux, Middleware, Virtualization, Storage and Cloud. At DevConf.cz, FLOSS communities sync, share, and hack on upstream projects together in the city of Brno, Czech Republic.

DevConf.cz is held annually, usually during the last weekend of January (one week before FOSDEM), at the Brno University of Technology Faculty of Information Technology campus.

The topics of the conference in 2020 were: Agile, DevOps & CI/CD, Cloud and Containers, Community, Debug / Tracing, Desktop, Developer Tools, Documentation, Fedora, Frontend / UI / UX, Kernel, Immutable OS, IoT (Internet of Things), Microservices, Middleware, ML / AI / Big Data, Networking, Platform / OS, Quality / Testing, Security / IdM, Storage / Ceph / Gluster and Virtualization.

== Conference history ==
The Developer Conference started in 2009 and followed the FUDCon, the Fedora User and Developer conference.

- 2009
  - September 10–11 at Faculty of Informatics Masaryk University - focused on Linux developers, advanced users and developers of JBoss
  - 33 talks and workshops
  - JBoss topics like Jopr, jboss.org, Drools, Jbpm to Fedora topics like KDE and core utils
  - The keynote speakers were Radovan Musil and Radek Vokal
- 2011
  - February 11–12 at Faculty of Informatics Masaryk University
  - Two parallel tracks
  - around 200 attendees
- 2012
  - February 17–18 at Faculty of Informatics Masaryk University
  - 60 talks (95% in English)
  - more than 600 attendees
  - GTK+ hackfest and GNOME Docs Sprint
- 2013
  - February 23–24 at Faculty of Informatics Masaryk University
  - 60 talks, 18 lightning talks, 20 workshops
  - around 700 attendees
- 2014
  - February 7–9 at Faculty of Informatics Masaryk University
  - 6 parallel tracks (3 talk tracks and 3 workshop tracks)
  - more than 1000 attendees
  - The keynote speaker was Tim Burke from Red Hat
- 2015
  - February 6–8 at Faculty of Information Technology Brno University of Technology
  - 154 workshops and talks
  - more than 1000 attendees
  - 8 parallel tracks (5 talk tracks and 3 workshop tracks)
  - Winners of the Winter of Code competition were announced
  - The keynote speakers were Tim Burke, a vice president of Red Hat engineering, and Mark Little, a vice president of Red Hat engineering and CTO of JBoss Middleware
- 2016
  - February 5–7 at Faculty of Information Technology Brno University of Technology
  - 203 workshops and talks
  - 1600 attendees
  - 8 parallel tracks (5 talk tracks and 3 workshop tracks)
  - Keynote speakers: Tim Burke, Jan Wildeboer, Denise Dumas and Matthew Miller
- 2017
  - January 27–29 at Faculty of Information Technology Brno University of Technology
  - 220 talks, workshops, keynotes across 20 tracks, 30 lightning talks
    - 3-5 sessions for Storage, Cloud, Networking, .net and Desktop
    - 6-10 sessions for Microservices, OpenStack, Testing, DevTools, Virtualization, DevOps and Agile
    - 11-15 sessions for Config Management, Linux and OpenShift
    - JUDCon had 18 sessions
    - Security, Fedora and Containers each had around 20 sessions
  - 1600 attendees
  - 13 community project booths, 4 community meetups
- 2018
  - January 26–28 at Faculty of Information Technology Brno University of Technology
  - 3 keynotes, 215 talks and discussions and 26 workshops across 20 tracks
  - 15 community project booths, 6 community meetups
  - Keynote speakers: Chris Wright, Hugh Brock, Michael McGrath, Jim Perrin, Matthew Miller
  - 1600 attendees
- 2019
  - January 25–27 at Faculty of Information Technology Brno University of Technology
  - 273 talks and workshops
  - 18 meetups and 6 activities
  - 1500 attendees
- 2020
  - January 24–26 at Faculty of Information Technology Brno University of Technology
  - 3 keynotes, 210 talks, 11 discussions, 23 workshops across 21 tracks
  - 20 community project booths, 12 community meetups and 5 fun activities
  - Keynote speakers: Leslie Hawthorn, William Benton & Christoph Goern, Karanbir Singh & Jeremy Eder
  - 1600 attendees
- 2021
  - February 18–20 as a virtual event
- 2022
  - January 28–29 at Faculty of Information Technology Brno University of Technology and virtually
- 2023
  - June 16–18 at Faculty of Information Technology Brno University of Technology
  - 290+ speakers
  - 1,100 attendees, 5,000 live stream views
- 2024
  - June 13–15 at Faculty of Information Technology Brno University of Technology
  - 12 speakers
- 2025
  - June 12–14 at Faculty of Information Technology Brno University of Technology
- 2026
  - June 18–19 at Faculty of Information Technology Brno University of Technology

== Financing ==
Entrance and participation in the event is entirely free. It is financed by variety of teams of Red Hat. The event is mainly organized and run by volunteers.

== See also ==
- List of free-software events
- FOSDEM
