= Decipol =

Measurement unit

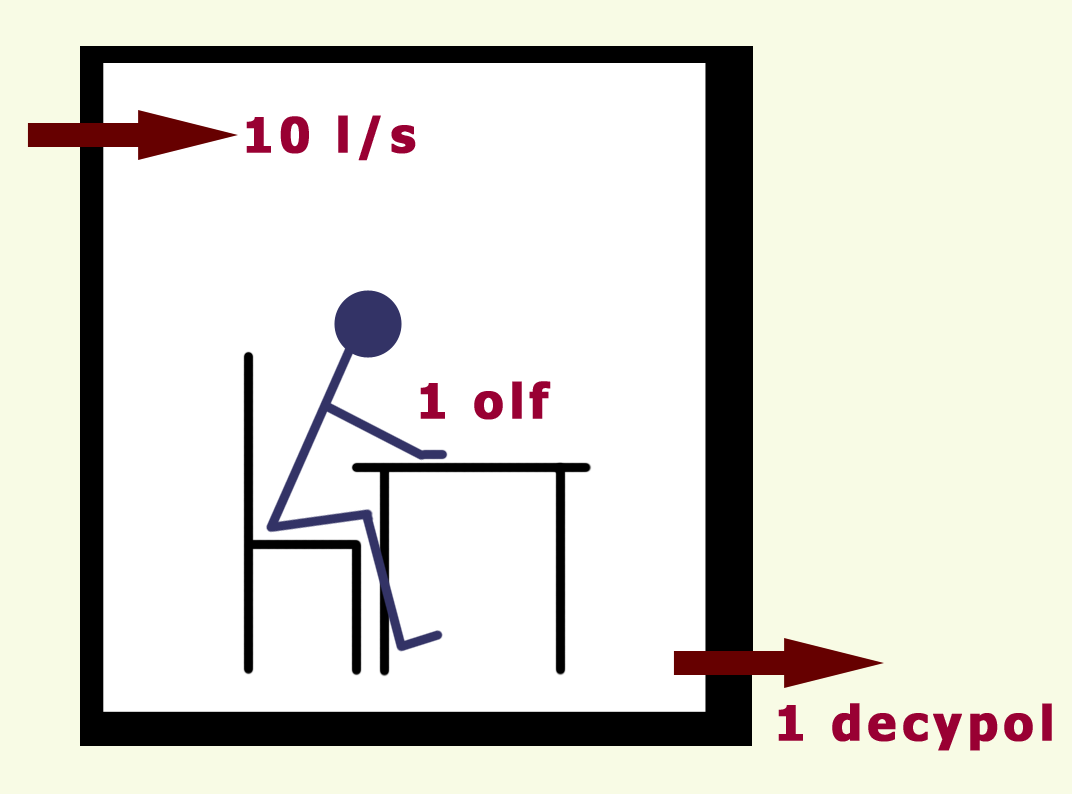

The decipol is a unit used to measure the perceived air quality. It was introduced by Danish professor P. Ole Fanger.

One decipol (dp) is the perceived air quality (PAQ) in a space with a sensory load of one olf (one standard person) ventilated by 10 L/s. It was developed to quantify how the strength of indoor pollution sources indoors influence air quality as it is perceived by humans.
