= Prague Business Journal =

Defunct business newspaper published in the Czech Republic (1996–2003)

- Type: Daily business newspaper
- Publisher: New World Publishing
- Founded: 1996
- Ceased publication: December 2003
- Language: English
- Headquarters: Prague
- Country: Czech Republic
- ISSN: 1211-3514
- OCLC number: 52298358
- Website: praguebusinessjournal.cz

Prague Business Journal or PBJ was an English-language business newspaper published in Prague, the Czech Republic, from 1996 to December 2003.

== History ==
The PBJ was founded in 1996. Its founder and publisher, New World Publishing, also published the Warsaw Business Journal in Poland and the Budapest Business Journal in Hungary. The company was headed by Stephen A. O'Connor, a US media entrepreneur. The PBJ in addition to the others mentioned above was a leading publication in its category.

The PBJ introduced itself as "the Czech Republic's leading English language business publication." Chris Johnstone served as managing editor of the PBJ.

The PBJ covered the financial and political news in regard to the Czech Republic's economy as well as news on arts and entertainment. The paper was a major competitor to another English-language weekly, Prague Post.

The PBJ ceased publication in December 2003. Czech Business Weekly is the successor of the paper.
