= Povl Ole Fanger =

Danish academic (1934–2006)

- Born: 16 July 1934; Vejlby, Denmark
- Died: 20 September 2006 (aged 72); Syracuse, New York
- Occupation: Senior Professor

Povl Ole Fanger (16 July 1934 – 20 September 2006) was an expert in the field of thermal comfort and perception of indoor environments. He was a senior professor at the International Centre for Indoor Environment and Energy at the Technical University of Denmark. He was a visiting University Professor at Syracuse University when he died at the age of 72 from an abdominal aortic aneurysm. His work is credited with demonstrating that poor air quality in homes can cause asthma in children, and that poor air quality in workplaces decreases productivity. His contribution to the research on thermal comfort still defines the state of the art in HVAC technology and the basis for international standardisation. He is also known for creating indoor air quality (IAQ) units of measurement known as the olf and decipol.

Ole Fanger had two daughters, Bine and Tone. His wife Brit died about six months before he died. Ole is buried in Frederiksberg, Copenhagen, Denmark next to his wife.

== See also ==
- Ralph G. Nevins
