= COSCUP =

Conference for Open Source Coders, Users and Promoters 開源人年會
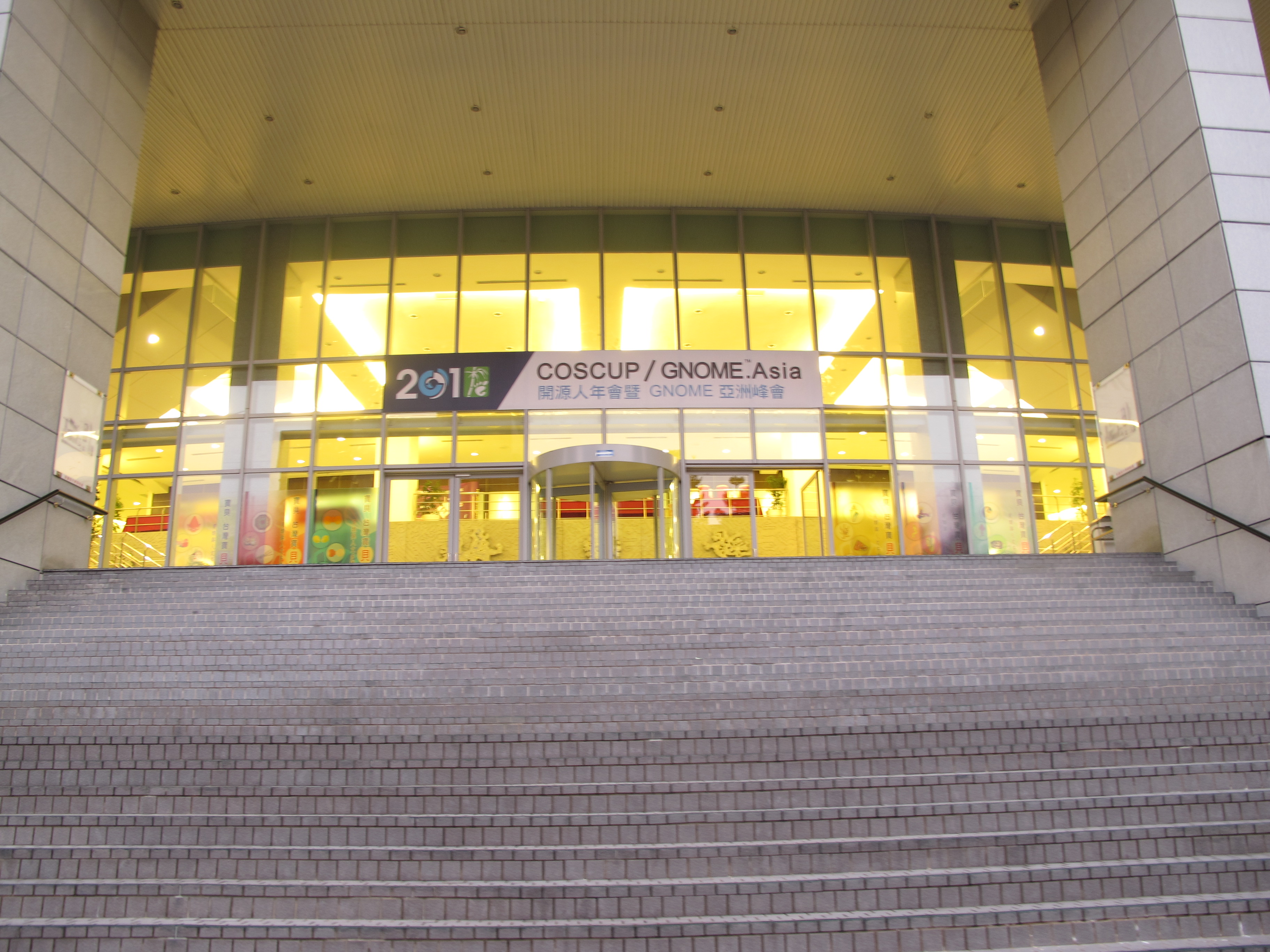
- COSCUP/ GNOME.Asia 2010, held in Academia Sinica
- Status: Active
- Genre: Open source conference
- Frequency: Annual
- Venue: Various locations, including Academia Sinica and Taipei International Convention Center
- Country: Taiwan
- Inaugurated: 2006
- Attendance: ~2,000 (2014)
- Organizer: Taiwanese open source community volunteers

Conference for Open Source Coders, Users and Promoters (COSCUP; Chinese: 開源人年會) is an annual conference held by Taiwanese open source community participants since 2006. It is a major force of free software movement advocacy in Taiwan. The event is typically held over two days and includes talks, sponsor and communities booths, and Birds of a feather sessions. In addition to international speakers, many Taiwanese local open source contributors often give talks. The chief organizer, other staffs, and speakers are all volunteers.

COSCUP's aim is to provide a platform to connect open source coders, users, and promoters, and promote free and open-source software (FLOSS) with the annual conference. The conference is free to attend because of the sponsors and donors. Since the conference venue is limited, tickets are often sold out immediately after the online registration starts.

The lightweight Desktop Environment LXDE was announced at COSCUP 2006.

== History ==
COSCUP's predecessor was the community talks in International Conference on Open Source (Chinese: zh:國際開放源碼研討會, ICOS). In 2006, ICOS's topics no longer fit some attendees' demand; Taiwanese open source community participants initiated COSCUP as a "festival" for Taiwanese open source communities. The initiative was supported by organizations including the Institute for Information Industry, Taipei Open Source Software User Group, and Chisn Information Co.

The first event, COSCUP 2006, was held at National Taiwan University Sports Center, and was attended by nearly 200 participants. The conference subsequently changed venues several times. From 2010 to 2012, it was held at the Humanities and Social Sciences Building of Academia Sinica, where attendance grew to over one thousand participants annually. In 2013, COSCUP was held at the Taipei International Convention Center, with 1,500 attendees, and 110 talks. Later in 2014, COSCUP returned to Academia Sinica Humanities and Social Sciences Building, but the conference also extends to the neighboring Academia Sinica Academic Activities Center. This was the first time COSCUP was held in two venues simultaneously.

The number of attendees grew to almost 2000 by COSCUP 2014.

Due to changes in venue availability at Academia Sinica following labor policy adjustments in Taiwan, COSCUP relocated again in 2017. That year, the conference reintroduced a community track system, in which multiple open source communities organized and curated their own sessions. The 2017 event included appearances by public figures such as Ko Wen-je and Simon Chang. In 2018, COSCUP was held at National Taiwan University of Science and Technology.

== Registration ==
COSCUP's registration set records in 2010, 2011, and 2012, as the server crashed within minutes after registrations began, the registration process is often done after hours, due to heavy server load. In COSCUP 2013, the conference started to use Registrano for registration. The system successfully sustained the heavy load of the registrations, this also led to the later success with KKTIX with COSCUP 2014.

== See also ==
- List of free-software events
