= Hochschule Bonn-Rhein-Sieg University of Applied Sciences =

German university

Coordinates: 50°46′50″N 7°10′55″E

- Hochschule Bonn-Rhein-Sieg
- Motto in English: International, innovative, networked and committed to the leitmotif of sustainability
- Type: Public
- Established: 1995
- Chancellor: Angela Fischer
- President: Marion Halfmann
- Administrative staff: 1000 (2017/18)
- Students: 9,000 (2025)
- Location: North Rhine-Westphalia, Germany
- Campus: Sankt Augustin, Rheinbach and Hennef
- Website: https://www.h-brs.de

Hochschule Bonn-Rhein-Sieg University of Applied Sciences (German: Hochschule Bonn-Rhein-Sieg, H-BRS) is a public German university of applied sciences with approximately 9,000 students and 150 professors Its campus comprises three distinct locations, situated in Sankt Augustin, Rheinbach and Hennef/Sieg (all in the vicinity of Cologne and Bonn). Since 1 January 2009, it bears the name Hochschule Bonn-Rhein-Sieg and the abbreviation H-BRS, which is also used internationally. The international title is Hochschule Bonn-Rhein-Sieg, sometimes followed by the addition: University of Applied Sciences.

== History ==
=== General Information ===
Hochschule Bonn-Rhein-Sieg was founded on 1 January 1995 by the German Federal State of North Rhine-Westphalia. Its formal establishment was part of an agreement that compensated Bonn for its loss of status as capital of the Federal Republic of Germany. Until the end of 2004, the University of Applied Sciences was funded by the Federal Government of Germany. From 2005 it became an establishment of the German Federal State of North Rhine-Westphalia; since 1 January 2007 it has been an autonomous body of public law as defined by the German Higher Education Autonomy Act (Hochschulfreiheitsgesetz, HfG). The University of Applied Sciences was renamed “Hochschule Bonn-Rhein-Sieg” on 1 January 2009, with the abbreviation being “H-BRS”. In October 2011, Hochschule Bonn-Rhein-Sieg joined the European University Association (EUA).

=== Locations ===
The university comprises three locations, including five departments. The Departments of Computer Science as well as Engineering and Communication (IWK) are located at Sankt Augustin Campus, the Department of Natural Sciences can be found at Rheinbach and the Department of Management Sciences is located at both campuses. The Hennef and Sankt Augustin sites house the Department of Social Policy and Social Security Studies. Hochschule Bonn-Rhein-Sieg's administrative facilities are located at the Sankt Augustin site. In Bonn the University of Applied Sciences runs the Bonn-Aachen International Center for Information Technology (B-IT) in collaboration with RWTH Aachen University and the University of Bonn.

== Departments and degree programmes ==
The university offers around 40 degree programmes across a total of five departments, divided into Bachelor’s and Master’s programmes. In addition, there are continuing education and certificate programmes.[9] The university comprises the following departments:

- The Department of Management Sciences
- The Department of Computer Science
- The Department of Engineering and Communication
- The Department of Natural Sciences
- The Department of Social Security Studies

== Central facilities and research institutes ==
=== Central facilities ===
==== Language Centre ====
The Language Centre works in close cooperation with all the departments, offering tailor-made courses to suit their individual requirements. At present the Language Centre offers general and subject-specific courses in 14 languages, which are, for the most part, held by native speakers. The range of courses is extended according to the students' individual requirements and needs. Furthermore, the Language Centre provides international students with the opportunity to sit internationally recognised language tests in English and German as a foreign language, such as the German Language Proficiency Test for the Admission of International Students to German Universities (DSH), which is mandatory for study at H-BRS. In addition to offering foreign-language courses and testing, the Language Centre conducts seminars in Intercultural Communication.

==== University and District Library ====
The buildings of the university and District Library, which also serves as district library for the Rhein-Sieg District, are located at Sankt Augustin and Rheinbach. The Library provides its customers with a versatile collection of books, periodicals, digital media and databases, which can in part be accessed from home. In addition, it offers regular art exhibitions, book readings and manifold information services as well as e-learning facilities. The Language Centre's Computer-Assisted Language Learning Laboratory (CALL) and a self-access centre are integrated into the Library.

=== Research institutes ===
- The Centre for Entrepreneurship, Innovation and SMEs (CENTIM)
- The Centre for Ethics and Responsibility (ZEV)
- The Centre for Teaching Development and Innovation (ZIEL)
- The Graduate Institute (GI)
- The Institute for Artificial Intelligence and Autonomous Systems (A2S)
- The Institute for Cyber Security & Privacy (ICSP)
- The Institute for Digital Consumption (IVI)
- The Institute for Functional Gene Analytics (IFGA)
- The Institute for Management (IfM)
- The Institute for Media Research and Development (IMEA)
- The Institute of Safety and Security Research (ISF)
- The Institute of Technology, Resource and Energy-Efficient Engineering (TREE)
- The Institute of Visual Computing (IVC)
- The International Centre for Sustainable Development (IZNE)

== Student life ==
=== National Code of Conduct and international partnerships ===
The Hochschule Bonn-Rhein-Sieg University of Applied Sciences has agreed to accept the "National Code of Conduct on Foreign Students at German Universities", passed by the German Rectors’ Conference in 2009. The Code of Conduct is aimed at strengthening internationalisation at German universities by securing and continuously enhancing the quality of support provided to international students. The guiding principle is, wherever possible, to grant international students the same rights as German or EU students enjoy and, over and above that, to offer them the services and assistance that they particularly need. The Code of Conduct is a voluntary commitment by the participating universities and contains fundamental standards relevant to the areas of information, marketing and admission as well as academic, language and social support. International students coming to the Hochschule Bonn-Rhein-Sieg can rely upon compliance with the standards. This voluntary commitment demonstrates H-BRS' undertaking to provide appropriate support, which is an essential condition for the sustainable success of international students and researchers. Hochschule Bonn-Rhein-Sieg currently maintains partnerships with approximately 60 universities all over the world.

=== Studierendenwerk Bonn (student services organisation) ===
The Studierendenwerk Bonn looks after the interests of all students in the surrounding region, including those enrolled at Hochschule Bonn-Rhein-Sieg. It is responsible for H-BRS' food service, provides accommodation and helps with student finance as well as childcare. It is the students’ contact point for all matters relating to student welfare.

=== Student executive bodies and committees ===
The interests of the Student Body, which comprises all the students enrolled at Hochschule Bonn-Rhein-Sieg are represented by the following executive bodies and committees: the Student Parliament (StuPa), the General Students’ Committee (AStA), the student councils within each department as well as BRSU's central executive bodies, where the student representatives hold several seats. Every student at Bonn-Rhein-Sieg University can be elected into one of these institutions for a one-year term of office. One of the boards of the AStA, dealing with cultural issues, initiates intercultural exchange projects. In addition, the student councils offer help and advice to international students.

=== International Welcome Centre ===
The International Welcome Centre is a meeting and service point aimed at providing support to all international students and guest academics before and during their study period at the Hochschule Bonn-Rhein-Sieg University of Applied Sciences. Here students can obtain all information relevant to the formalities required, to accommodation as well as life in Germany and on the campus.

=== International Office ===
The International Office organises regular excursions, boat trips and cultural events for international students. Through its proximity to the Rhine, the Siebengebirge mountains, the Eifel, the High Fens region and the Nürburgring, the Rhein-Sieg District provides excellent leisure opportunities. The nearby cities of Bonn, Aachen and Cologne, with their theatres, concert halls, museums, art galleries and cathedrals, offer a versatile programme of activities from the cultural point of view, too.

In collaboration with the Bonn-Rhein-Sieg Employment Agency (Agentur für Arbeit Bonn/Rhein-Sieg), the International Centre also runs a project aimed at supporting international students who wish to work in Germany when graduating from university.

=== Study Buddies ===
The Study Buddy programme was initiated by the Department of Natural Sciences. Study Buddies are students in higher semesters who volunteer to look after students during the first weeks of their stay in Germany. This may involve contacting them via email, picking them up at the airport or the railway station, explaining the pitfalls of the German registration procedures, showing them around the university or simply sharing a coffee and chatting about the new experiences gained.

=== HELP – support for students and employees with family commitments ===
HELP is a contact point aimed at giving support and advice to students and employees who have questions on how to balance their study/job and family commitments. HELP is responsible for collecting and communicating relevant information on childcare facilities and holiday childcare schemes to parents or members of BRSU with relatives in need of care. H-BRS also provides specially equipped study rooms to parents with young children. During their holidays, primary and secondary school children can be looked after within the framework of a project called "Try it".

== Reputation, rankings and contests ==
The Hochschule Bonn-Rhein-Sieg has been given excellent ratings and been presented with a number of achievement awards in many areas over the past few years.

=== Family-Friendly University ===
Since March 2007 Hochschule Bonn-Rhein-Sieg was awarded the basic certification as a “Family-Friendly University” for providing family-friendly facilities to students and employees alike - including childcare facilities, study rooms for parents with children, alternating telework and much else. In June 2010 the certification was extended for an additional three years.

=== Participation in international contests and organisation of international events ===
==== b-it-bots contest ====
The b-it-bots team, which includes members of the University of Applied Sciences, regularly takes part in various RoboCup contests. Among others, it won the titles of German Champion (in 2009 and 2010) and World Champion (2009) in the RoboCup@Home contest. The b-it-bots RoboCup@Work team was established in 2012. Participation in various international competitions resulted in several podium positions, most importantly first place at the RoboCup World Championships 2019 in Sydney and 2023 in Bordeaux. The team primarily consists of students in the Master of Autonomous Systems degree programme. The team consists of professors from the Department of Computer Science, academic staff and students of the master's degree programme in Autonomous Systems.

==== Formula Student ====
The student team BRS Motorsport takes part in Formula Student competitions in Europe, in which around 270 university teams from around the world each build a prototype single-seat racing car and draw up a concept for a hypothetical production run of 1,000 cars a year.

==== FrOSCon ====
The two-day Free and Open Source Software Conference (FrOSCon) on issues relating to software and open source is held once a year by the association of the same name in collaboration with the local Linux/Unix User Group and the Department of Computer Science.

== Notable alumni ==
- Katrin Bauerfeind (*1982), TV presenter
- Martin Kläser (*1987), poker player
- Julia Seeliger (*1979), journalist and politician
- Marco Knauf, Niclas Lecloux and Inga Koster, founders of the True Fruits business enterprise
- Witali Malykin (* 1982), Chess player

== See also ==
- List of German universities
- Wikipedia website in German
