= FrOSCon =

Annual conference on free and open-source software

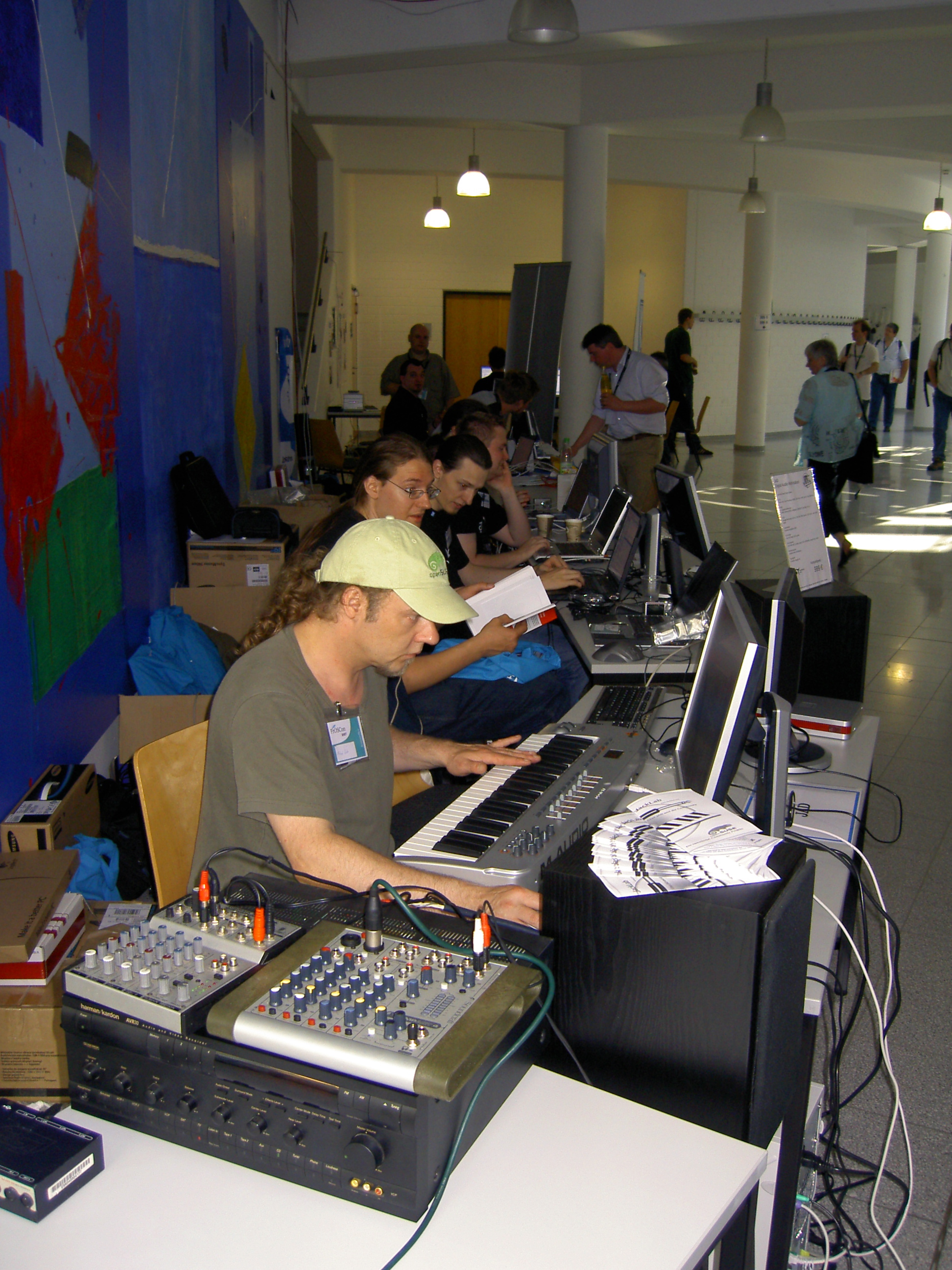
Music with Linux at FrOSCon 2007

The FrOSCon (Free and Open Source CONference) is an annual conference organized by the Bonn-Rhein-Sieg University of Applied Sciences and the FrOSCon e.V. The FrOSCon features a variety of lectures and workshops on free and open source software. The event takes place regularly at the end of August since 2006. It is considered one of the largest events of this kind in Europe and the largest in Germany, with the Chemnitz Linux Days being second.

A large range of speakers are part of the scene. Organizational work is done solely by volunteers. Since 2014, the FrOSCon e.V. decided not to charge anything for admission.

== Topics ==
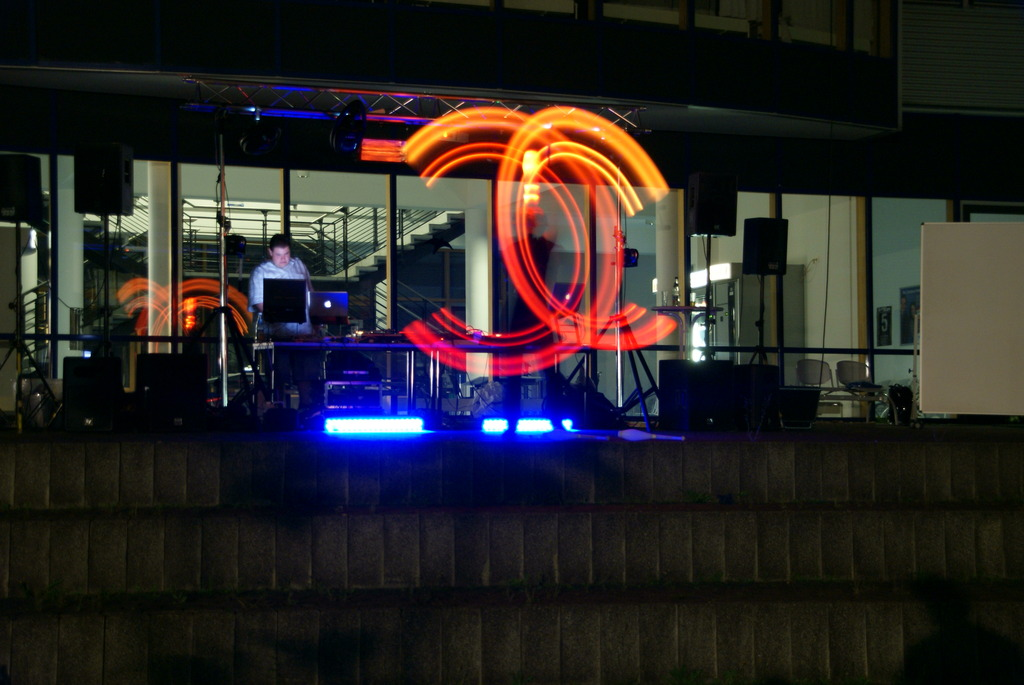
Lightshow at FrOSCon 2010

The FrOSCon has covered a wide array of topics over the years.

Year	Main topics
2025	Clouds over Europe - Digital Sovereignty and broken promises; When the autopilot fails - Risks and side effects of AI; Does it Matter? - Smart Home in 2025; Retro-Computing - VAXination becoming cool again; Reproducible Papers - Open Source in science; Better Websites for Everybody - European Accessibility Act
2024	Bridging the Gap between politics and reality - Open Source Lobbying; Security; In Rust we trust - Memory safe languages; Culture
2023	Development; Security; Web Development; Open your Windows for a breeze of fresh air - Open Source in public administration
2022	Development; If you don't schedule time for maintenance, your system will schedule it for you - everyone needs a break sometimes; Culture; System Administration
2021	This FrOSCon was online on video calls due to the COVID-19 pandemic; Wood work instead of IT? - Leisure activities you developed during lock down; Home-Office365 (-days later) - Lessons learned in the 1st year working from home; LPI-Day; Development
2020	This FrOSCon was online on video calls due to the COVID-19 pandemic; Working (together) in spite of Corona - Lessons learned on the journey to working from home; Clouds on the horizon - What happens when there's no space left in the cloud; Privacy vs. pandemic response - Who's protecting our data from the virus; Databases
2019	Software Defined Anything; IOT - The S stands for security; Network and Automation Track; Security
2018	Blessed by the algorithm; FrOSCon meets Science; there's a Tux in your window; The crossroads of privacy
2017	"Coexisting with Bots" – Why can't we just be friends?; "The Rise of Machine Learning" – You Only Learn Once; "Are you still migrating or have you started working?" – Change in tempo in Open Source development; "The golden years are over" – Software-Designpatterns in 2017
2016	FrOSCon meets Science; Getting to the source; Internet of Things; Putting Open Data on the map
2015	A decade of Free and Open Source Software; Cloud; New Kids On The Net; Open Source to go
2014	Open Source Culture; Monitoring; State of the Init; Virtualisation
