= EnterpriseDB =

American software company

EnterpriseDB Corporation
- Type: Private
- Industry: Software & database
- Founded: March 2004
- Key people: Kevin Dallas, Chief Executive Officer; Ryan Blackwell, Chief Operating Officer; Eric Mersch, Chief Financial Officer
- Products: software and services based on the open-source database PostgreSQL
- Number of employees: 850+ (2024)
- Website: enterprisedb.com

EnterpriseDB (EDB) is an American company that provides software and services based on the open-source database PostgreSQL (also known as Postgres), and is one of the largest contributors to Postgres. EDB develops and integrates performance, security, and manageability enhancements into Postgres to support enterprise-class workloads. EDB has also developed database compatibility for Oracle to facilitate the migration of workloads from Oracle to EDB Postgres and to support the operation of many Oracle workloads on EDB Postgres.

== History ==
EDB was founded in 2004, and in 2005, introduced its database, EnterpriseDB 2005. It was named Best Database Solution at LinuxWorld that year. EDB renamed the database EnterpriseDB Advanced Server with its March 2006 release. The database was renamed Postgres Plus Advanced Server in March 2008. In April 2016, with the introduction of the EDB Postgres Platform, EDB's fully integrated next-generation data management platform, the database was renamed to EDB Postgres Advanced Server.

In 2020, EDB acquired 2ndQuadrant, a global Postgres solutions and tools company based out of the UK, becoming the leader in the PostgreSQL market.

EDB initially operated under the leadership of Ed Boyajian as President and CEO. Kevin Dallas was named CEO in August 2023.

== Ownership ==
EnterpriseDB was purchased by Great Hill Partners in 2019. In June 2022, Bain Capital Private Equity purchased a majority stake in the company, with Great Hill Partners remaining a significant shareholder.
