= Olf (unit) =

Unit of the strength of a pollution source

The olf is a unit used to measure the strength of a pollution source. It was introduced by Danish professor P. Ole Fanger; the name "olf" is derived from the Latin word olfactus, meaning "smelled".

One olf is the sensory pollution strength from a standard person defined as an average adult working in an office or similar non-industrial workplace, sedentary and in thermal comfort, with a hygienic standard equivalent of 0.7 baths per day and whose skin has a total area of 1.8 square metres. It was defined to quantify the strength of pollution sources that can be perceived by humans.

The perceived air quality is measured in decipol.

== Examples of typical scent emissions ==
Person/object	Scent emission
Sitting person	1 olf
Smoker	25 olf
Athlete	30 olf
Marble	0.01 olf/m²
Linoleum	0.2 olf/m²
Synthetic fibre	0.4 olf/m²
Rubber gasket	0.6 olf/m²

== See also ==
- Sick building syndrome
