= NetX =

The netX network controller family (based on ASICs), developed by Hilscher Gesellschaft für Systemautomation mbH, is a solution for implementing all proven Fieldbus and Real-Time Ethernet systems. It was the first Multi-Protocol ASIC which combines Real-Time-Ethernet and Fieldbus System in one solution. The Multiprotocol functionality is done over a flexible cpu sub system called XC. Through exchanging some microcode the XC is able to realize beside others a PROFINET IRT Switch, EtherCAT Slave, Ethernet Powerlink HUB, PROFIBUS, CAN bus, CC-Link Industrial Networks Interface.

== The Hilscher netX family ==
Controller	netX 52	netX 51	netX 90	netX 100	netX 500
CPU models	ARM 966/xPIC	ARM 966/xPIC	2* ARM Cortex®-M4	ARM 926 + MMU/-	ARM 926 + MMU/-
CPU clock	100 MHz	100 MHz	100 MHz	200 MHz	200 MHz
RAM / ROM	672kB/64kB	672kB/64kB	576kB+64kB/ 96kB	144kB/32kB	144kB/32kB
Host Interface Funktions	DPM/SPM/EXT/MEM	DPM/SPM/EXT/MEM	DPM/SPM	DPM/-/EXT	DPM/-/EXT
MemoryI/F Parallel/Serials	-/SQI XiP	8, 16, 32 Bit/ SQI XiP	SQI XiP	8, 16, 32 Bit/-	8, 16, 32 Bit/-
xC Channels	2	2	2	3	4
IEEE 1588 Sys Timer/EthernetPHY (10/100 Mbit/s)	2/Dual-PHY 10/100	2/Dual-PHY 10/100	2/Dual-PHY 10/100	1/Dual-PHY 10/100	1/Dual-PHY 10/100
I²S/I²C/SPI/UART	-/2/1/3	-/2/1/3	-/2/4/2	-/1/1/3	-/1/1/3
CAN/MAC/LCD	1/1/-	1/1/-	2/-/-	-/-/-	-/-/1
IO-Link Master Ports	4	8	8	-	-
ADC Channels	-	-	2*2	2*4	2*4
USB 1.1 Device/Host	D/-	D/-	D/-	D/H	D/H
WDC/Timer Counters	2/10	2/10	4*32-bit / 8*32-bit	1/5	1/5
MMIO*/GPIO*/PIO	40/32/62	48/32/62	16/8/49	0/16/84	0/16/84
Package Size (mm)/Type (pins)	15*15/BGA(244)	19*19/BGA(324)	10*10/BGA(144)	22*22/BGA(345)	22*22/BGA(345)

=== Multiplex Matrix IOs (MMIO) ===
The Multiplex Matrix is a set of PINs which could be configured freely with peripheral functions. Options are CAN, UART, SPI, I2C, GPIOs**, PIOs and SYNC Trigger.

=== GPIOs ===
The GPIOs from Hilscher are able to generate Interrupts, could count level or flags, or could be connected to a timer unit to auto generate a PWM. The Resolution of the PWM is normally 10ns. In some netX ASICS is a dedicated Motion unit with a resolution if 1ns is available.
