= Monimoto =

- Type: Private
- Industry: GPS Tracking, Anti-theft devices
- Founded: November 3, 2016
- Founder: Rolandas Dranseika, Antanas Masevičius, Andrius Bruno Rimkūnas
- Headquarters: Lithuania
- Area served: Worldwide
- Key people: Rolandas Dranseika (CEO), Antanas Masevičius (CTO), Andrius Bruno Rimkūnas (Business Developer)
- Products: Anti-theft GPS trackers for motorcycles, ATVs, golf carts, boats
- Revenue: 4.9M€ (2025)
- Number of employees: 18 (2025)
- Website: https://monimoto.com

Monimoto is a Lithuanian-based company that produces anti-theft GPS tracking devices for motorcycles, scooters, ATVs, golf carts, boats, and other mobile assets.

== History ==
Monimoto was founded on November 3, 2016, in Vilnius, Lithuania, by Rolandas Dranseika (CEO and product manager), Antanas Masevičius (CTO and architect of software, cybersecurity, and telecommunications), and Andrius Bruno Rimkūnas (marketer and business developer). The idea for the company originated in 2013, when Andrius Rimkūnas met Rolandas Dranseika, then the CEO of ELDES alarms, and suggested creating a bicycle tracker. In 2014, the Monimoto brand was registered under ELDES alarms, and a prototype was developed. However, due to limited resources, the project was paused in 2015.

In 2016, ELDES alarms sold the Monimoto project to Rolandas Dranseika and Andrius Rimkūnas, and Antanas Masevičius joined as the third co-founder. The company officially launched with the support of Aurelijus Rusteika, an angel investor and the founder of TOPOCENTRAS, Lithuania's largest consumer electronics retailer.

At the same year, Monimoto attracted its first investment of at least €50,000 from businessman Aurelijus Rusteika through Delta Investment.

From 2016 to 2019, Monimoto focused on product development, expanding from one employee to a small team that handled customer service, sales, and marketing. In 2018, Monimoto was awarded "Spin-off Startup of the Year" by the Startup Awards, organized by BZN Start.

In 2019, the company received a €300,000 investment from Iron Wolf Capital and began scaling its operations. By 2020, Monimoto surpassed €1 million in sales revenues, and in 2021, the company launched the Monimoto 7 GPS tracker in Europe, the UK, and the US. In 2022, Monimoto was recognized as a "Nifty 50 Top Products Winter/Spring 2022" by PowerSports Business.

In 2024, the company released its latest product, the Monimoto 9 GPS tracker, featuring a smaller size and rechargeable battery.

== Products ==
Monimoto's first six tracker models, designated MM1 through MM6, were released between 2017 and 2020. The devices used 2G and 3G cellular connectivity and were released in successive pairs. All models in this series have been discontinued.

Monimoto 7 was released in 2021 and uses LTE-M (LTE Cat-M1) and 2G, runs on two AA lithium batteries rated for up to 24 months, and uses a key fob to arm and disarm the tracker; an independent review praised its quick alerts and good location accuracy.

Cycloop, Monimoto’s bicycle tracker, was launched in 2023. Monimoto describes it as an LTE-M bicycle tracker with a rechargeable battery and integrated light, and the current product page shows it as out of stock. In 2025, it was officially discontinued.

Monimoto 9 was launched in 2024 as the company’s rechargeable tracker for vehicles and other assets. Monimoto says it is IP68-rated and lasts up to 12 months on a single charge, while Rider’s 2024 review noted the same battery life, IP68 rating, LTE-M connectivity, and a $179 MSRP plus a $49/year subscription after an initial trial.

Monimoto Business uses a web portal for fleet visibility, with user management, device grouping, daily location updates, and no wiring or professional installation.

Its products target both consumer and business markets, including private vehicle owners as well as fleet-based use cases such as car and motorcycle rentals, construction equipment tracking, and broader asset tracking applications across industries.

== Markets served ==
Monimoto serves both consumer and business customers in several vehicle and asset-tracking segments. The company's products are primarily used for anti-theft protection and recovery tracking, with a focus on mobile assets that are difficult to secure with wired tracking systems.

Key market segments include:

- Motorcycles and powersports: The primary market segment for the company's security products. Hardware is deployed across motorcycles, scooters, mopeds, ATVs, and snowmobiles. The brand's initial market entry focused on motorcycle security before expanding into broader recreational vehicle categories.
- Marine: Specialized tracking for boats and small watercraft. In this sector, devices are used for real-time location monitoring and theft response for vessels docked in remote or varied locations.
- Construction and industrial equipment: Targeting the construction industry for the protection of portable machinery and tools. The autonomous nature of the hardware allows for deployment on assets that move frequently between job sites and lack a dedicated electrical system.
- Small Fleets and Rental Operations: Services for fleet-based business models, including motorcycle and car rental operators. These applications prioritize centralized asset visibility and simplified installation for small-scale fleet management.
- General Asset Tracking: Broader applications for any valuable mobile property requiring autonomous GPS tracking. This includes high-value equipment or logistics assets that benefit from movement-triggered alerts and long-term battery operation.

== See also ==
- Apple AirTag
- Samsung Galaxy SmartTag
- Teltonika
