= Fosscomm =

Greek FOSS conference

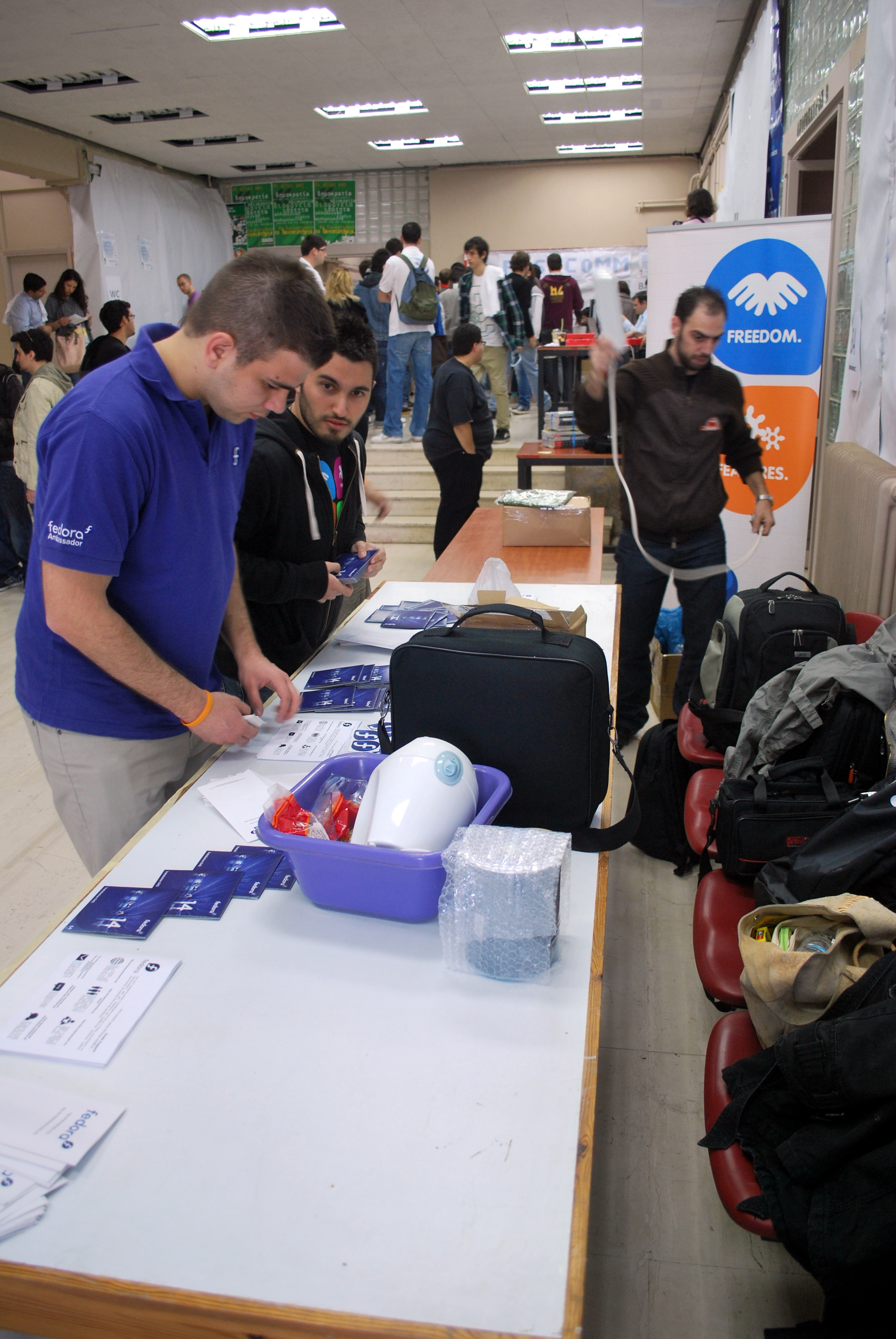
Patras Fosscomm lobby & booths photo

FOSSCOMM (Free and Open Source Software Communities Meeting) is a Greek conference aiming at free-software and open-source enthusiasts, developers, and communities. It has been hosted in various cities around Greece and its goal is to promote the use of FOSS in Greece and to bring FOSS enthusiasts together.

== Structure ==
The event runs during a weekend, and includes presentations from distinguished members of Greek free and open-source communities (such as Fedora Project Greece, Ubuntu-gr, Chania LUG, etc.), as well as workshops on various free and open-source projects.

== Financing ==
FOSSCOMM attendance is free, and all expenses are covered by sponsors and donations. The conference is organized and run solely by volunteers, in accordance with the non-commercial, community-centred nature of the event.

== Events ==
The first FOSSCOMM conference took place on May 21–22, 2008 in the National Technical University of Athens, with 26 presentations and 30 speakers.

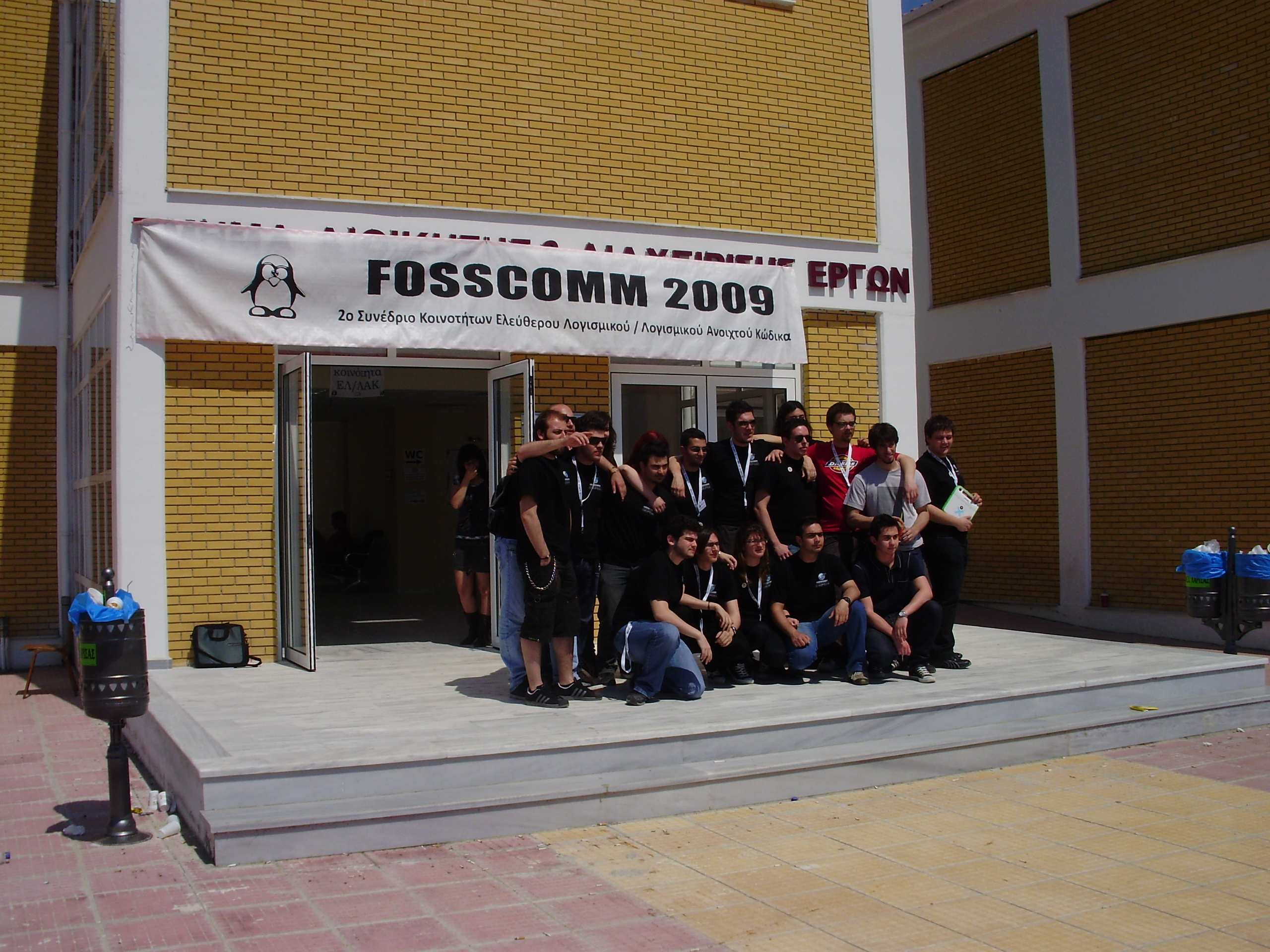
Larisa Fosscom organization committee photo

The second FOSSCOMM took place at the Technological and Educational Institute of Larissa, on May 9–10, 2009. It hosted 13 presentations and 4 workshops, the total duration was 14 hours, with more than 250 attendants.

The third FOSSCOMM took place on April 24–25, 2010 in Thessaloniki. The event was held at the Aristotle University of Thessaloniki, and consisted of 41 presentations, and 12 workshops.

The fourth FOSSCOMM took place at the University of Patras on May 7–8, 2011 and was co-organized by the department's Laboratory for Computing and the Patras Linux Users Group. It consisted of 74 presentations and 453 participants.

The fifth FOSSCOMM took place at the Technological Educational Institute of Serres on May 12–13, 2012.

The sixth FOSSCOMM took place at Harokopio University in Athens on April 20–21, 2013.

The seventh FOSSCOMM took place at the Technological and Educational Institute of Central Greece in Lamia, on May 2–4, 2014.

The eighth FOSSCOMM took place at the Technological Educational Institute of Athens in Athens, on November 6–8, 2015.

The ninth FOSSCOMM took place at the University of Piraeus in Piraeus, on April 16–17, 2016.

The tenth FOSSCOMM took place in Harokopio University in Athens, on November 4–5, 2017.

The eleventh FOSSCOMM took place in University of Crete near Heraklion, on October 13–14, 2018.

The twelfth FOSSCOMM took place in University of Thessaly near Lamia, on October 11–13, 2019.

The thirteenth FOSSCOMM took place online and hosted by University of Western Macedonia on November 20-22, 2020.

The fourteenth FOSSCOMM took place online and hosted by University of Macedonia on November 13-14, 2021.

The fifteenth FOSSCOMM took place in University of Thessaly near Lamia, on November 18-20, 2022

The sixteenth FOSSCOMM took place in University of Crete near Heraklion, on October 21–22, 2023

The seventeenth FOSSCOMM took place online and hosted by University of Macedonia on November 9-10, 2024.
