= GCC Summit =

Annual Developers Conference

The GCC Summit was an annual conference for developers of the GNU Compiler Collection and related free software technologies. The conference was a 3-day event and was held from 2003–2010 in Ottawa, Ontario, Canada with the exception of the 2009 summit, which was held in Montreal, Quebec, Canada. It has been replaced by the GNU Tools Cauldron.

== GCC Summit dates ==
- 2003: May 25–27 (proceedings)
- 2004: June 2–4 (proceedings)
- 2005: June 22–24 (proceedings)
- 2006: June 28–30 (proceedings)
- 2007: July 18–20 (proceedings)
- 2008: June 17–19 (proceedings)
- 2009: June 8–10 (proceedings)
- 2010: October 25–27 (proceedings, individual papers and slides)

== GNU Tools Cauldron ==
The GCC Summit has been replaced by the GNU Tools Cauldron, a conference held by GNU mainly focused on GNU Compiler Collection (GCC), but also GNU Debugger, GNU Binutils, and others.

== See also ==
- Summit (meeting)
- Compiler
