= Ontario Linux Fest =

The Ontario Linux Fest was an annual grass roots conference organized by, and for, Linux and open source enthusiasts, held in Ontario, Canada from 2007 to 2009. The event debuted on October 13, 2007. Each conference lasted one day. Topics included technical discussions regarding software projects, new and emerging technologies and how to's, and non-technical topics such as advocacy, history and motivational talks.

== History ==
The Ontario Linux Fest was the idea of Richard Weait and John Van Ostrand. The pair attended the Ohio LinuxFest for the first time in 2004 and were very pleased with the content and organizations of the event. A few different ideas about an Ontario Linux Fest were discussed on the way back from Ohio, but it wasn't until late 2006 that Van Ostrand took the first steps in organizing the Ontario Linux Fest.

The organizers canceled the event in 2010.
