= Warsaw Business Journal =

- Type: Weekly newspaper
- Format: Tabloid
- Owner: Valkea Media
- Editor: Sankhyayan (Shanks) Datta
- Founded: 1994; 32 years ago
- Language: English
- Headquarters: Warsaw
- Circulation: 20,000
- Website: www.wbj.pl

Warsaw Business Journal is an English-language weekly newspaper based in Warsaw, Poland.

== History and profile ==
Warsaw Business Journal was established in 1994. It is owned by Valkea Media. Its publisher is the New World Publishing which also publishes the Budapest Business Journal in Hungary. Previously it also published the Prague Business Journal in Czechoslovakia. PBJ closed in 2003. It covers business, economics, politics, finance, real estate, stock markets, entertainment, technology and culture.

== Print characteristics ==
Tabloid format; full color.
