= Elms =

Elms are trees in the genus Ulmus.

Elms or ELMS may refer to:

== Places ==
- Elms colliery, a mine in England
- Elms School (disambiguation), schools in England
- Elms Village, a student village in Northern Ireland
- Elms College, Massachusetts, United States
- Elms Township, Bottineau County, North Dakota, United States
- Elms Hotel (disambiguation), United States
- Elms (Mechanic Falls, Maine), a building in the United States

== People with the surname ==
- Albert Elms (1920–2009), English composer
- Anthony Elms, American curator, writer and artist
- Daniel Elms (born 1985), British composer
- Dave Elms (fl. 1999), founder of The Erotic Review
- Harvey Elms (born 1995), Scottish rugby player
- Henry Elms (c. 1861–1928, Australian football coach
- John Elms (1874–1951), English cricketer
- Lauris Elms (born 1931), Australian singer
- Richard Elms (born 1949), English cricketer
- Robert Elms (born 1959), English writer and broadcaster

== Other uses ==
- Elms, several species of trees
- ACO European Le Mans Series, a racing series
- IMSA European Le Mans Series, a defunct racing series; see 2001 European Le Mans Series
- Electric Last Mile Solutions (ELMS)

== See also ==
- The Elms (disambiguation)
- Elm (disambiguation)
- Elmsdale (disambiguation)
