= The Elms =

The Elms may refer to various buildings and other places:

== In Canada ==
- The Elms, Toronto, a neighbourhood in Toronto

== In Great Britain ==
- The Elms, Abberley an old established house, now a hotel and restaurant in Worcestershire, England
- The Elms (Bedhampton) an historic Gothic house in Hampshire, England
- The Elms, Beverley, historic building in the East Riding of Yorkshire, England
- The Elms (North Wingfield, Derbyshire), a grade II listed house
- The Elms School, Colwall, a school in Herefordshire
- The Elms School, Long Eaton, a school in Derbyshire
- The Elms, an electoral ward of Magor with Undy, Monmouthshire, Wales

== In the United States ==
- The Elms (Altheimer, Arkansas), listed on the NRHP in Jefferson County, Arkansas
- The Elms (Woodland, Georgia), listed on the NRHP in Talbot County, Georgia
- E. H. Gibbs House, in Oskaloosa, Iowa, also known as The Elms at Ridge Place
- The Elms (Harrodsburg, Kentucky), listed on the NRHP in Mercer County, Kentucky
- The Elms (Watertown, Massachusetts) (1710), historic home of the prominent Whitney family
- The Elms (Houlton, Maine), listed on the NRHP in Aroostook County, Maine
- Elms (Mechanic Falls, Maine), listed on the NRHP in Maine
- The Elms (Natchez, Mississippi), listed on the NRHP in Adams County, Mississippi
- Elms Hotel (Excelsior Springs, Missouri), a hotel in Excelsior Springs, Missouri
- Daniel Webster Family Home, also known as "The Elms", in West Franklin, New Hampshire
- The Elms (Newport, Rhode Island), a mansion or "summer cottage", listed on the NRHP in Rhode Island
- The Elms (Franklin, Virginia), listed on the NRHP in Virginia

== Other ==
- The Elms (band), a rock and roll band from Seymour, Indiana USA
- The Elms (mission station), New Zealand mission station founded by Alfred Brown

== See also ==
- Elms (disambiguation)
- Elm (disambiguation)
