= Meinel (surname) =

Meinel is a surname. Notable people with the surname include:

- Aden Meinel (1922–2011), American astronomer
- Carolyn Meinel (CPM) (born 1946), notable in the hacking scene during the 1990s
- Christel Meinel (born 1957), East German cross country skier
- Christoph Meinel (born 1954), German scientist and university professor of computer sciences
- Dieter Meinel (1949–2026), East Germany cross country skier
- Dietmar Meinel, German Nordic combined skier
- Gabriele Meinel, German cross country skier
- Marjorie Meinel (1922–2008), American astronomer
- Reinhard Meinel, German physicist
- Rico Meinel (born 1974), retired German ski jumper

== See also ==
- Meinel (disambiguation)
- Meynell
