= Hannah Steele Pettit =

American astronomer

- Born: Hannah Bard Steele; November 6, 1886; Coatesville, Pennsylvania
- Died: September 10, 1961 (aged 74); Los Angeles, California
- Education: Swarthmore College University of Chicago
- Known for: Publishing images on the corona of the solar eclipse
- Spouse: Edison Pettit
- Children: 2, including Marjorie
- Relatives: Carolyn Meinel (granddaughter); Jerry and Mary Newport (grandson-in-law and granddaughter); Valerie Aurora (great-granddaughter); Aden Meinel (son-in-law); Keith Henson (ex-grandson-in-law)
- Scientific career
- Fields: Astronomy
- Workplaces: Yorkes Observatory Mount Wilson Observatory
- Thesis: Proper Motions and Parallaxes of 359 Stars in the Cluster h Persei

Hannah Steele Pettit (November 6, 1886 – September 10, 1961), also known as Hannah Bard Steele Pettit, was an American astronomer who spent a notable amount of her career working as an assistant at the Yerkes Observatory, where she and her husband Edison Pettit jointly published photographs on the corona of a solar eclipse.

== Early life and education ==
Hannah Steele Pettit was born in Coatesville, Pennsylvania on November 6, 1886.

Pettit studied at Swarthmore College, where she received her Bachelor of Arts in astronomy in 1908 and her M.A. in 1912. She went on to receive her Ph.D. in astronomy from the University of Chicago in 1919, completing her dissertation on "Proper motions and parallaxes of 359 stars in the cluster h Persei."

== Career ==
Following her graduation from Swarthmore College, Pettit worked as an astronomical observer at the school observatory, Sproul Observatory. While working on her doctorate degree, Pettit worked for the Mount Wilson Observatory associated with the Carnegie Institution, and worked there for the remainder of her career. She participated in a number of expeditions to observe solar eclipses during her career. The first expedition, in 1918, was to Matheson, Colorado. A second expedition was made to Point Loma, New Hampshire in 1923. A few years later, she participated in an expedition to view an eclipse in Honey Lake, New Hampshire in 1930, and a final expedition was taken to Lancaster, New Hampshire in 1932.

During her career, Pettit was inducted into the Astronomical Society of the Pacific. As part of her work with the society, Pettit reviewed many scholarly articles published by the society.

She died in Los Angeles, California on September 10, 1961, at the age of 74, after suffering a severe stroke.

== Publications ==
- Parallaxes of Fifty-Two Stars

== Personal life ==
Hannah married Edison Pettit while working on her Ph.D. dissertation. Her two daughters, Marjorie Pettit Meinel and Helen Pettit Knaflich were both astronomers.
