= Jerry and Mary Newport =

Authors, advocates, and public speakers (1948–2023 and 1954/1955–unknown)

Jerry Newport and Mary Newport
- Mary and Jerry Newport on their wedding day
- Occupations: Authors, public speakers, advocates
- Notable work: Mozart and the Whale: An Asperger's Love Story
- Relatives: Valerie Aurora (niece)
- Jerry Newport
- Birth name: Gerald Newport
- Born: January 1948
- Died: January 24, 2023 (aged 74–75); Tucson, Arizona
- Mary Newport
- Birth name: Mary Meinel
- Born: 1954/5
- Children: 2
- Parents: Aden Meinel; Marjorie Meinel
- Relatives: Carolyn Meinel (sister); Edison Pettit (grandfather); Hannah Steele Pettit (grandmother); Keith Henson (ex-brother-in-law)

Gerald Newport (January 1948 – January 24, 2023) and Mary Newport (née Meinel, also known as Mary Meinel-Newport; 1954/1955 – ?) were authors, advocates, and public speakers who had been diagnosed with Asperger syndrome and whose lives became the basis for the 2005 film Mozart and the Whale. Their written works include self-help books related to autism and Asperger's, as well as their 2007 memoir Mozart and the Whale: An Asperger's Love Story.

== Biography ==
Jerry Newport was born in 1948 and raised in Islip, New York by parents who were teachers. By age 7, he began showing signs of advanced mathematical ability, which continued to develop during school. Jerry graduated from the University of Michigan with a B.A. in mathematics. He then spent about twenty years in a variety of jobs, including cab driver, busser, and deliveryperson.

According to Alex Bellos, "As soon as Jerry sees a big number, he divides it up into prime numbers", and this made driving cab "particularly enjoyable" for Jerry, because "there was always a number on the licence plate in front of him." Bellos also described Jerry's process as "very similar" to the sieve of Eratosthenes.

Mary Meinel was born in 1954 or 1955 and raised in Tucson, Arizona, one of seven children of the astronomers Aden Meinel and Marjorie Meinel. She began to have difficulty in school as an adolescent. She attended the University of Arizona for more than two years, and left in 1978 after what she described as a nervous breakdown.

Mary worked as a piano technician and tuner in Los Angeles and New York, and in 1986, began composing music and drawing, but felt discouraged from art and music by relatives and friends in the late 1980s. She also studied gemological identification and jewelry manufacturing, and tried to work in the gem industry in New York City. Mary had two sons, and she and her children moved frequently over ten years.

In 1991, Mary obtained representation from Central Casting and was later hired for guest appearances on Star Trek. She was diagnosed with autism/Asperger's in 1993 by a UCLA psychologist and referred to a support group.

Jerry had seen the film Rain Man for the first time in 1988, then started reading about autism and contacted Bernard Rimland, a founder of the Autism Society of America. After Jerry attended conferences about autism, he became a coordinator for the first self-help group for adults with autism, the chair of an ad-hoc advisory panel to the Autism Society of America, and a spokesperson.

Mary met Jerry at a support group in Los Angeles. In 1993, Jerry told Mary about a Halloween party being held by the Adult Gathering, United and Autistic self-help group; she attended dressed as Mozart, and he wore a whale costume constructed from chicken wire and newspaper. Their first date was at the Los Angeles Zoo on November 28, 1993. They became engaged in April 1994, and married in August 1994.

In 1995, at age 47, Jerry was diagnosed with Asperger syndrome. In October 1995, Kim Kowsky wrote a feature article about Jerry and Mary in the Los Angeles Times, and quoted Linda Demer, a former board member of the Autism Society of Los Angeles, referring to them as "superstars in the world of autism" and "a source of inspiration for a lot of people". In March 1996, the Arizona Daily Star reported Mary could write "beautiful, note-perfect classical symphonies perfectly, and often while painting or drawing with her other hand". In September 1996, they appeared on the CBS News show 60 Minutes.

Jerry and Mary separated in 1997. In June 1999, they divorced, and Mary returned to Tucson. Mary called Jerry after about a year afterwards, and they remarried eleven months later, on Valentine's Day in 2002. By 2004, they resided in Arizona, and the film Mozart and the Whale, loosely based on their lives, was completed but not yet released. They appeared on 60 Minutes in another segment by Lesley Stahl in 2004. The film Mozart and the Whale was released in 2005.

In 2007, Mary was working as a peer counselor, and Jerry worked as a cab driver and tax preparer. In June 2010, Jerry competed in the Mental Calculation World Cup in Magdeburg, Germany and won the World Cup Trophy for "Most Versatile Calculator".

== Writing career ==
Following their appearance on 60 Minutes in 1996, Jerry and Mary wrote self-help books for people with autism and Asperger syndrome. Their work includes Autism/Aspergers & Sexuality: Puberty and Beyond, which was released on July 1, 2002. Chantal Sicile-Kira writes in Autism Spectrum Disorder (revised): The Complete Guide to Understanding Autism that parts of Autism/Aspergers & Sexuality and the 2001 book written by Jerry, Your Life is Not a Label, "can be very helpful to the teenager", and Your Life is Not a Label is one of several books that help dispel the myth about people with autism lacking emotion and being incapable of forming attachments to other people.

=== Mozart and the Whale: An Asperger's Love Story ===
Their writing career also includes the 2007 memoir Mozart and the Whale: An Asperger's Love Story, co-authored with Johnny Dodd, about their lives with Asperger syndrome, including after gaining media attention.

According to a Publishers Weekly review, "autistic readers will find comforting fellowship, and general readers will acquire valuable knowledge." In a chapter contributed to Development and Brain Systems in Autism, Temple Grandin described Jerry as a "patterns thinker" and "numbers savant", and wrote that the memoir Mozart and the Whale is a way to "learn more about" his "method of specialized thinking". Stephen Shore, the author of Beyond the Wall: Personal Experiences With Autism and Asperger Syndrome said that with their book, "Jerry and Mary Newport show us all what it is to be human and how love truly can conquer all."

A review in Library Journal states "While this book has a great deal of promise, and its subjects' lives are truly interesting, the book fails to deliver" and suggests Songs of the Gorilla Nation: My Journey Through Autism by Dawn Prince-Hughes or A Real Person: Life on the Outside by Gunilla Gerland for "better descriptions of Asperger's syndrome in adults", while also stating the book "could benefit larger public libraries with autism collections".

== Selected works ==
- Newport, Jerry (2001). Your life is not a label : a guide to living fully with autism and Asperger's syndrome for parents, professionals, and you!. Arlington, Texas: Future Horizons. ISBN 1-885477-77-5.
- Newport, Jerry; Mary Newport (2002). Autism-Asperger's & Sexuality: Puberty and Beyond. Arlington, Texas: Future Horizons. ISBN 1-885477-88-0.
- Newport, Jerry; Mary Newport; Johnny Dodd (2007). Mozart and the Whale: An Asperger's Love Story. New York: Touchstone Books. ISBN 978-0-7432-7282-7.

== Personal life ==
Jerry and Mary both kept birds as pets before they married in 1994. By 2004, they had 11 birds, three iguanas, and a rabbit. In 2007, their household included a poodle mix named Wolfie and 13 birds.
