= Valerie Aurora =

American computer scientist and activist

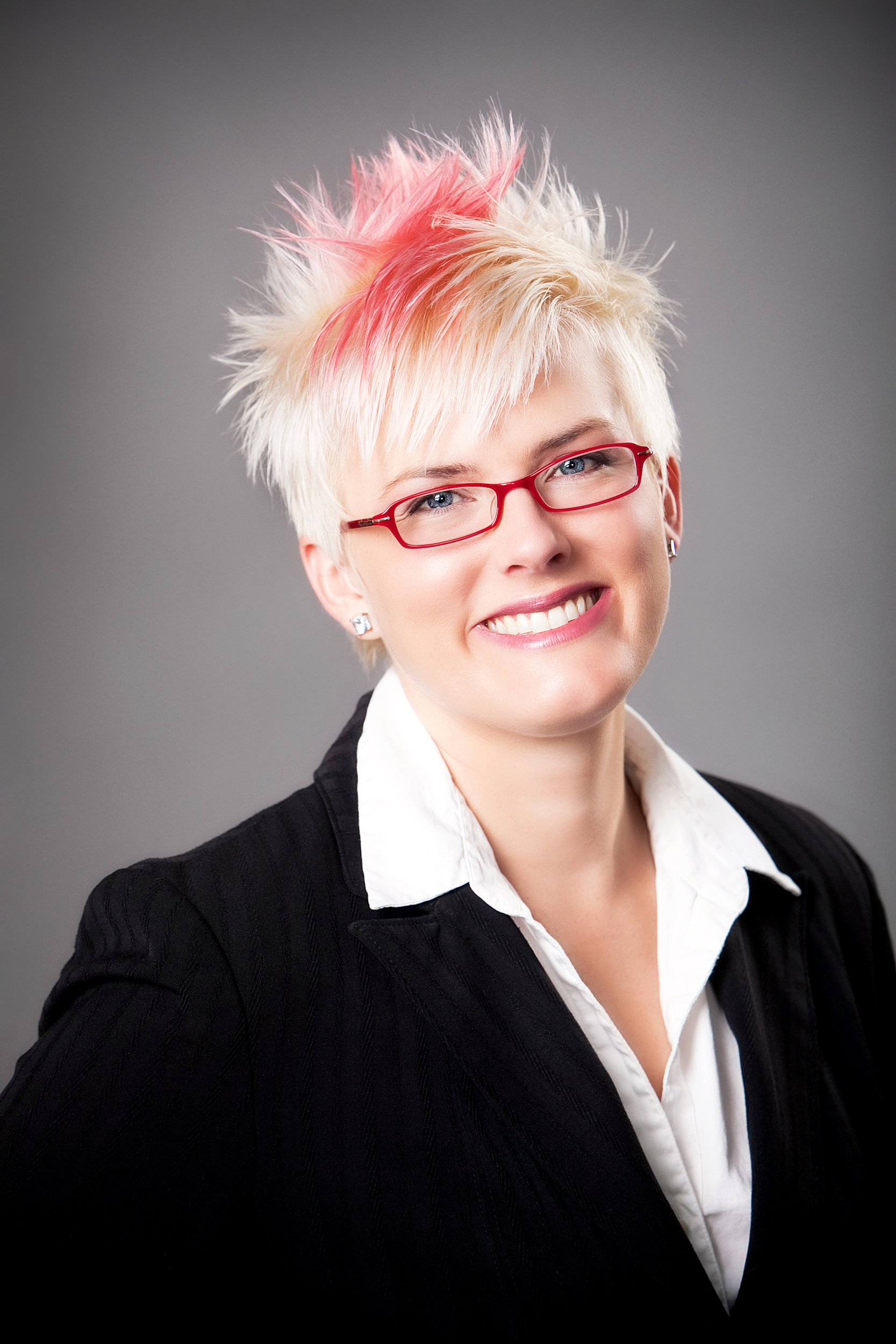
- Born: Val Henson; United States
- Education: New Mexico Institute of Mining and Technology
- Known for: Founder of the Ada Initiative
- Parent(s): Carolyn Meinel; Keith Henson
- Relatives: Jerry and Mary Newport (uncle and aunt); Aden Meinel (grandfather); Marjorie Meinel (grandmother); Edison Pettit (great-grandfather); Hannah Steele Pettit (great-grandmother)
- Awards: O'Reilly Open Source Award
- Website: Official website

Valerie Anita Aurora is an American software engineer and feminist activist. She was the co-founder of the Ada Initiative, a non-profit organization that sought to increase women's participation in the free-culture movement, open-source technology, and open source culture. Aurora is also known within the Linux community for advocating new developments in filesystems in Linux, including ChunkFS and the Union file system. Her birth name was Val Henson, but she changed it shortly before 2009, choosing her middle name after the computer scientist Anita Borg. In 2012, Aurora, and Ada Initiative co-founder Mary Gardiner were named two of the most influential people in computer security by SC Magazine. In 2013, she won the O'Reilly Open Source Award.

== Early life and education ==
Daughter of Carolyn Meinel and Keith Henson, Aurora was raised in New Mexico, and was home-schooled. She became involved in computer programming when she attended DEF CON in 1995. She studied computer science and mathematics at the New Mexico Institute of Mining and Technology.

== Programming ==
She first became involved with file systems when she worked with ZFS in 2002 at Sun Microsystems. She later moved to IBM where she worked in the group of Theodore Ts'o, where they considered extensions to the ext2 and ext3 Linux file systems. While working at Intel, she implemented the ext2 dirty bit and relative atime. Along with Arjan van de Ven, she came up with the idea for ChunkFS, which simplifies file system checks by dividing the file system into independent pieces. She also co-organized the first Linux File Systems Workshop in order to figure out how to spread awareness of and raise funding for file system development. As of 2009, she worked for Red Hat as a file systems developer as well as a part-time science writer and Linux consultant.

== Ada Initiative ==
Already an activist for women in open source, she joined Mary Gardiner and members of the Geek Feminism blog to develop anti-harassment policies for conferences after Noirin Shirley was sexually assaulted at ApacheCon 2010. Together with Gardiner, she founded the Ada Initiative in February 2011. The organization was named after Ada Lovelace, who worked with Charles Babbage and is considered to be the world's first computer programmer. Two years later, Aurora founded Double Union, a hackerspace for women, with Amelia Greenhall and Liz Henry. The Ada Initiative was shut down in October 2015.

== Writing ==
Maintaining a blog since 2007, Aurora has written extensively about coding and the experiences of women in open source. This has included descriptions of DEF CON and the harassment that took place there. In 2013, Aurora provided a comment to The Verge about the Electronic Frontier Foundation's involvement in the legal defense of Andrew Auernheimer, who was in prison for hacking and had previously harassed Kathy Sierra. Aurora said "This is another case where they're saying, 'The cases we care about are the ones white men are interested in. We’re less interested in protecting women on the web.'" This comment was received negatively by the EFF's Director of International Freedom of Expression, Jillian York.

Another 2013 controversy that received commentary from Aurora was Donglegate in which a female attendee at a nearly all-male PyCon attendee faced backlash for reporting a conversation overheard between two men sitting near her. Aurora condemned the threats sent to the woman and stated that Anonymous, by using large numbers of computers, was "distorting social pressure". When asked if firing one of the males was an appropriate response, she said "I don't have enough information to know that." Two years later, Aurora praised the gender ratio at PyCon and called Guido van Rossum and the Python community "the biggest success story for women in open source." In the same interview, she approved of the culture of the website Tumblr and stated that Linus Torvalds' daughter Patricia was a positive role-model.

== See also ==
- AdaCamp
