= Marjorie Meinel =

American astronomer (1922–2008)

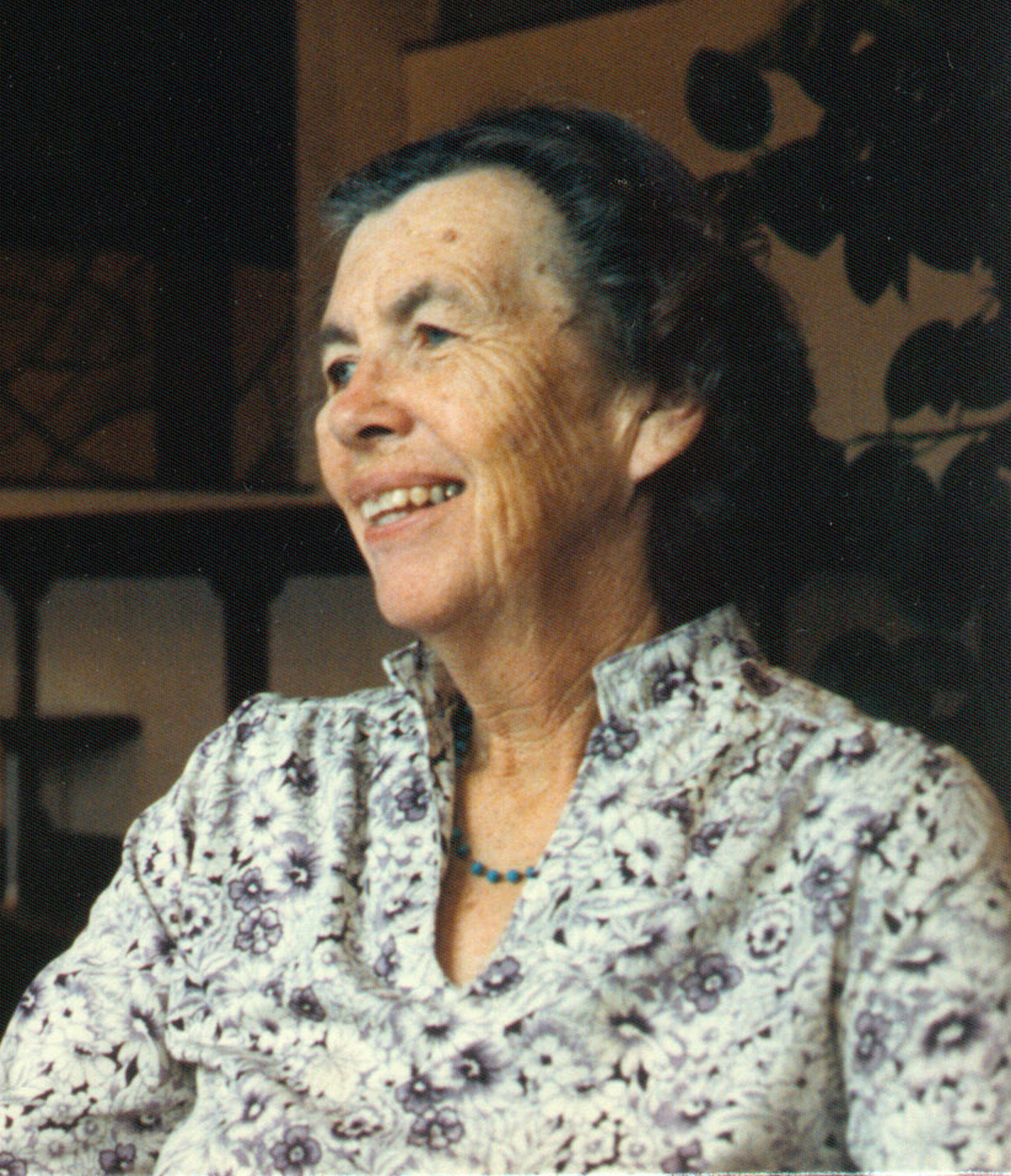
- Meinel in 1987
- Born: Marjorie Steele Pettit; May 13, 1922; Pasadena, California, U.S.
- Died: June 24, 2008 (aged 86); Henderson, Nevada, U.S.
- Education: Pomona College (B.A.); Claremont Colleges (M.A.)
- Spouse: Aden Meinel (m. 1944)
- Children: 7, including Carolyn and Mary
- Parents: Edison Pettit (father); Hannah Steele Pettit (mother)
- Relatives: Valerie Aurora (granddaughter); Jerry Newport (son-in-law); Keith Henson (ex-son-in-law)
- Scientific career
- Fields: Astronomy; Optical science; Solar energy
- Workplaces: California Institute of Technology; University of Arizona; Jet Propulsion Laboratory

Marjorie Pettit Meinel (born Marjorie Steele Pettit; May 13, 1922 – June 24, 2008) was an American astronomer and optical scientist. Her research focused on telescope design and optics, the technological applications of solar energy, atmospheric phenomena including the optical effects of volcanic eruptions, and the study of variable stars. For over 60 years she was the research collaborator and wife of fellow astronomer Aden Meinel.

== Biography ==
=== Early life ===
Marjorie Steele Pettit was born in Pasadena, California May 13, 1922, to astronomers Edison Pettit and Hannah Steele Pettit who were based at the Mount Wilson Observatory. Meinel's older sister, Helen, also became an astronomer. As a teenager, Meinel assisted her father in making the first time-lapse photography of solar prominence eruptions, using a movie camera and a quartz-polarising monochromator attached to the 6-inch Alvan Clark refracting telescope at their home. As her mother's health declined Meinel increasingly assisted her father's research on the telescope at home and at the observatory.

While at Pasadena Junior College Marjorie met and began dating fellow pupil Aden Meinel, urging him to study astronomy.

=== Astronomy ===
In 1941 she began studying astronomy at the University of California, Berkeley, and in 1942 transferred to Pomona College in Claremont, California to be closer to family. She also began teaching some classes at the university, including training airmen in celestial navigation. For her masters research at Claremont Colleges she used the family telescope in 1943–1944 to study the variable red giant RT Cygni. Her thesis research was published by the Astronomical Society of the Pacific. In 1944 she married Aden. From 1944 to 1945 she worked as a research associate at the California Institute of Technology working on military rockets. She also worked in the editorial staff of the Office of Scientific Research and Development preparing and editing reports, including reports for the Manhattan Project. She resigned when the war ended.

In 1946 she moved with Aden to Berkeley, California, where he was to continue his studies. Later that year she gave birth to the first of seven children, the final child born in 1957. While raising their children she was not employed, but remained scientifically active, collaborating in Aden's research, attending conferences, and editing their work.

Meinel co-authored two papers during this period, both on the optical effects of volcanic eruptions on the atmosphere. The Meinels' 1967 paper was the first to suggest that the optical effects on sunsets and sunlight in the years after a volcanic eruption are caused by sulphate aerosols, rather than volcanic dust.

In 1949 the family relocated to Yerkes Observatory in Wisconsin, then in 1955 to Phoenix, Arizona while Aden established the new Kitt Peak National Observatory, and then in 1961 to Tucson where Aden began working at the University of Arizona.

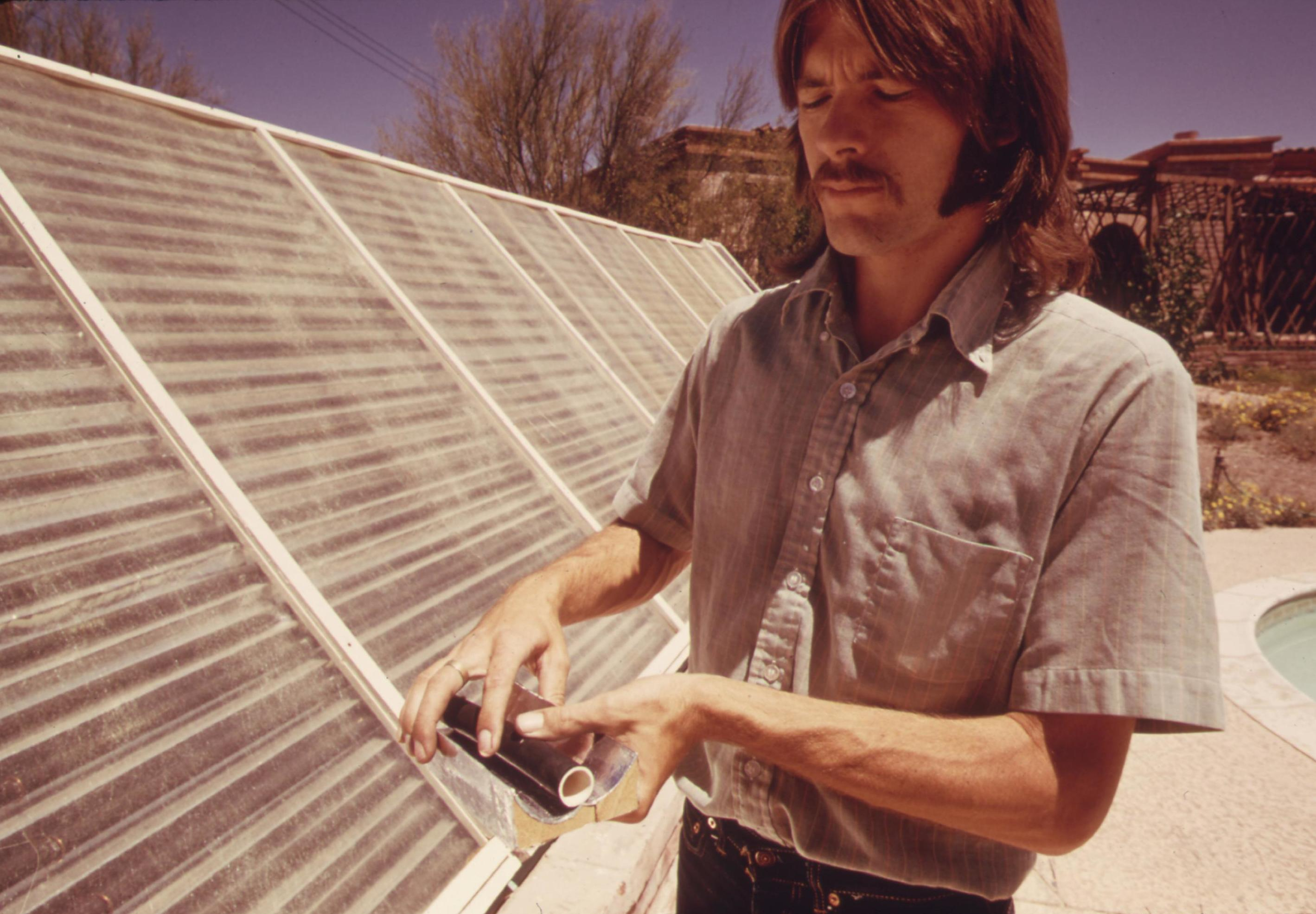
Meinel's son Walter demonstrates a solar thermal collector being used to heat the family's swimming pool in 1974

=== Renewable energy ===
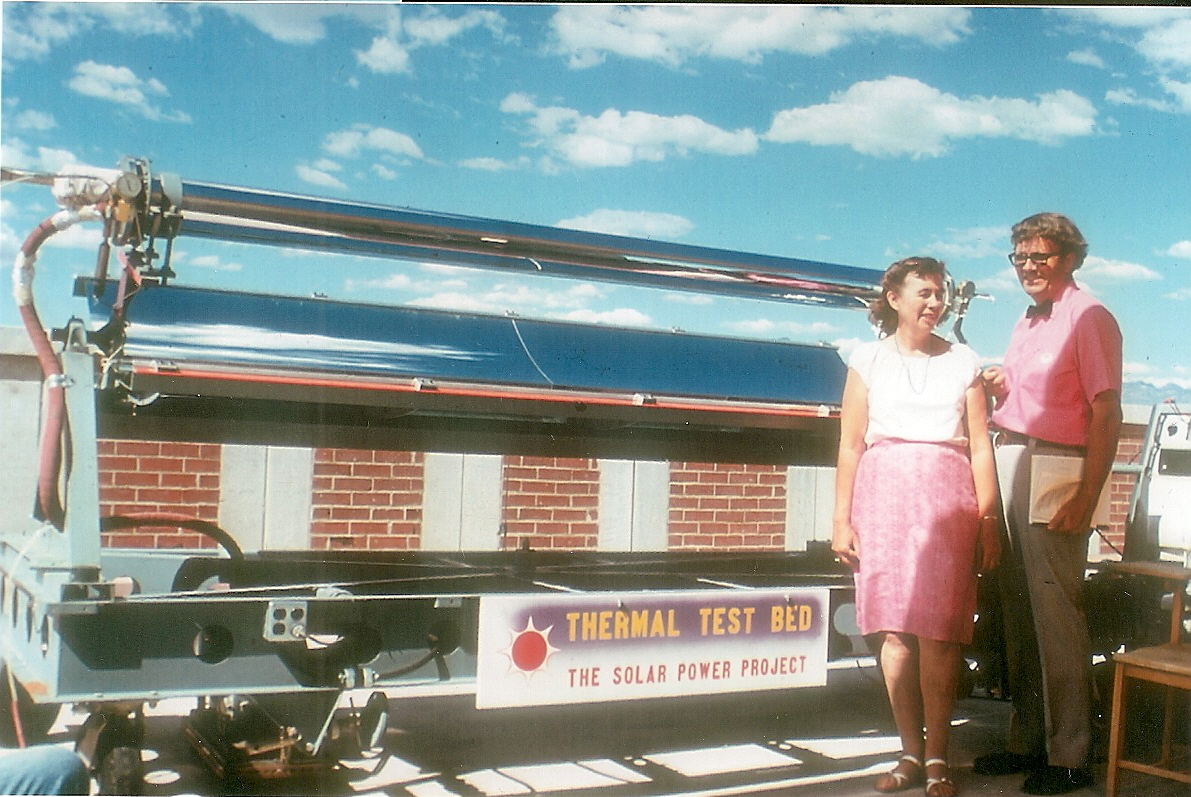
Marjorie and Aden Meinel in 1974 with a linear parabolic thermal collector developed by the Meinels at the University of Arizona

In 1970 Aden took a sabbatical so the couple could spend their time exploring barriers to the uptake of solar energy technology. In 1972, Meinel returned to academic employment, working as a research associate at the University of Arizona Optical Sciences Centre, which Aden had founded in 1964. The Meinels continued their solar research throughout the 1970s as part of a team at the university and experimented in developing prototype solar collectors. The Meinels became prominent advocates of solar thermal energy nationally. They were skeptical of the existing focus on small scale solutions, instead arguing for large-scale applications of solar technology by industry and government. They viewed the barriers as chiefly economic, rather than technical. They believed that through large-scale applications the costs and barriers for small-scale applications would reduce and the technology would become more affordable for developing countries. One idea they developed and promoted was the construction of a 5000-square mile farm of parabolic solar collectors in the deserts of Arizona and New Mexico to heat water to produce 1000-gigawatts of electricity using steam turbines.

They also explored other alternative energy sources, such as cultivating the tumbleweed Kali tragus as a biofuel.

Together they wrote two books on the subject of solar energy, Power for the People (1971) and the textbook Applied Solar Energy (1976). Meinel was a member of the Arizona Solar Energy Commission and of the Solar Energy Panel of the U.S. Congress Office of Technical Assessment. However, by 1977 the Meinels had become despondent towards the prospects of solar energy, with Meinel telling Congress "reality has dawned as the magnitude of the economic barrier has become clear [...] solar energy is expensive and is undependable." Solar energy research and development funding also began to dry up and the Meinels returned to focusing on astronomy.

=== Later career ===
In 1983 Meinel co-authored with Aden the book Sunsets, Twilights, and Evening Stars on the various optical phenomena visible from sunset, including their observations of the optical effects of volcanic eruptions.

In 1984 Meinel and Aden were recruited by the Jet Propulsion Laboratory (JPL) in Pasadena to work on identifying the next-generation space telescope project that was to follow on from the Hubble Space Telescope (HST). Their work at JPL focused on telescope design, including optical systems, the TAU mission, the Large Deployable Reflector project, and applications of interferometry. Meinel and Aden served on the Hubble Independent Optical Review Panel advising NASA on the state of the telescope's mirrors and suitable measures to counteract the spherical aberration ground into its primary mirror.

In 1995 Meinel and Aden retired from JPL, though they continued to work for JPL as consultants, alongside researching and publishing papers on telescope design and costings.

Meinel's health began to decline and she was diagnosed with Alzheimer's disease. In 2004 she published her final paper. In 2006 the couple moved to Henderson, Nevada, where Meinel died June 24, 2008, from natural causes at the age of 86. She was survived by Aden and their seven children. Aden Meinel died in 2011.

In 2022, a biography of Meinel and Aden was published by Oxford University Press, titled With Stars in Their Eyes: The Extraordinary Lives and Enduring Genius of Aden and Marjorie Meinel by James B. Breckinridge and Alec M. Pridgeon.

== Awards and honours ==
In 1980 the American Physical Society selected Meinel as one of five outstanding "Women in Physics". Meinel was cited on Aden's Frederic Ives Medal (1980) and his George W. Goddard Award in Space and Airborne Optics (1984). In 1992 she was elected as a fellow of the Society of Photo-Optical Instrumentation Engineers (SPIE). In 1992 and again in 2000 Meinel and Aden were jointly awarded the SPIE Rudolf and Hilda Kingslake Award in Optical Design. In 1997 they were awarded the SPIE Gold Medal, the society's highest award.

The 6 km (3.7 mi) wide asteroid 4064 Marjorie was named in honour of Meinel. The Meinel Building at the University of Arizona College of Optical Sciences and the SPIE Aden and Marjorie Meinel Technology Achievement Award are named after the Meinels.

== Books ==
- Meinel, Aden B.; Meinel, Marjorie Pettit (1971). Power for the People.
- ———; ——— (1976). Applied Solar Energy: An Introduction. Addison-Wesley. ISBN 0-201-04719-5.
- ———; ——— (1983). Sunsets, Twilights, and Evening Skies. Cambridge University Press. ISBN 978-0-521-25220-1.
