= Laura Quilter =

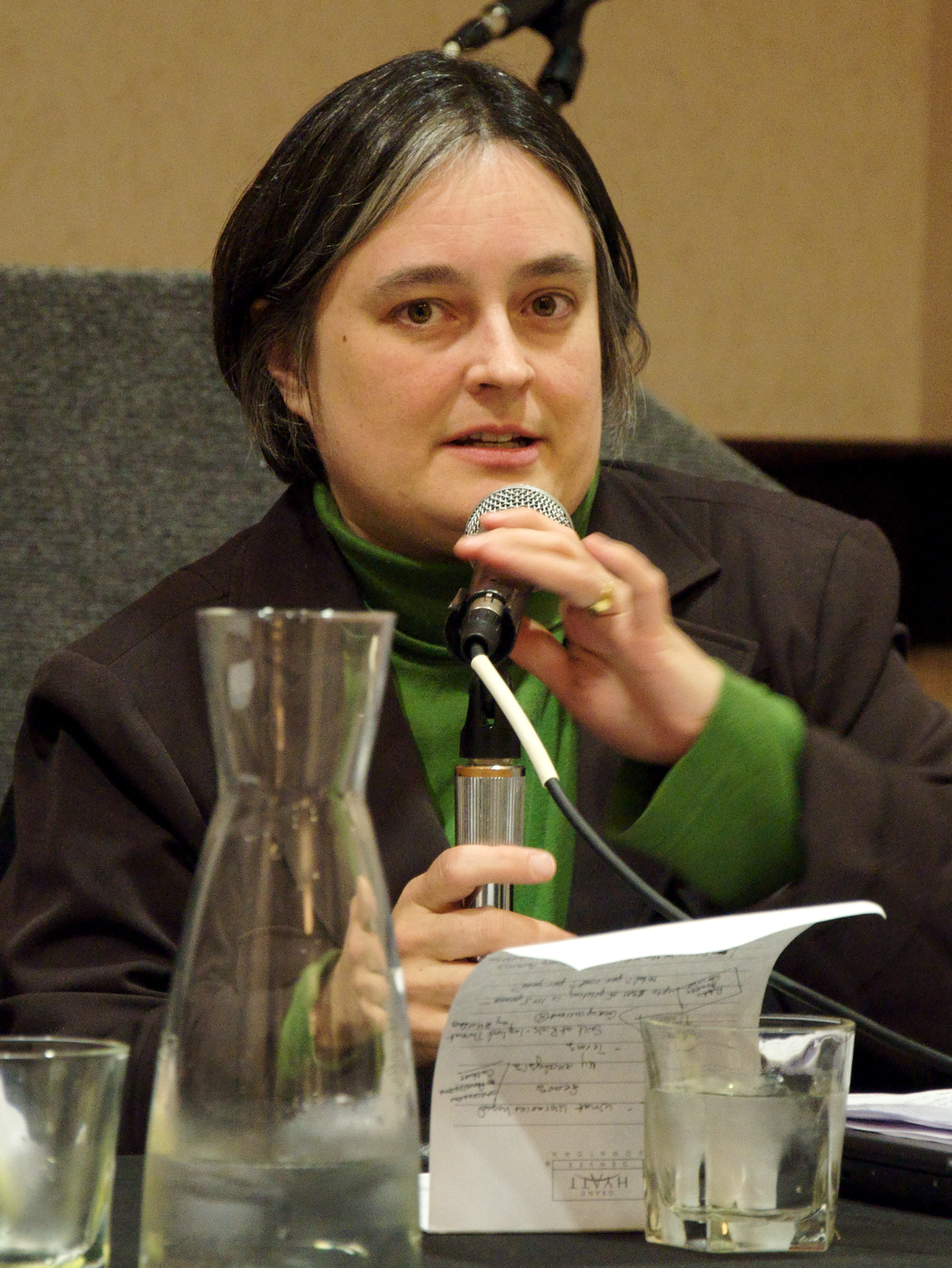
- Quilter in 2009
- Born: 1968 (age 57–58)
- Occupations: lawyer, librarian, essayist, editor
- Writing career
- Genres: Science fiction; non-fiction

Laura Quilter (born 1968) is a writer, lawyer, librarian, professor, and science fiction fan known for both her work on intellectual property and new media, and her long-standing archive of information on feminist science fiction.

She received her law degree from the University of California, Berkeley in 2003. From 2006 to 2008, she was a writer on Sivacracy.net, a law blog run by Siva Vaidhyanathan. She has worked at the Exploratorium, the Brennan Center Free Expression Policy Project at NYU, and the Samuelson Law, Technology and Public Policy Clinic at UC Berkeley, is a contributor to Chilling Effects, and created the Fair Use Network.

Her web site Feminist SF, Fantasy, and Utopia has been active since 1994. Over the years, the site expanded to become a community of feminist science fiction writers, fans, and critics, with a book discussion list, forums, blog carnival, group blog, and wiki, maintained by Quilter, Liz Henry, Janice Dawley, and other participants. She is also a co-founder of the feministSF wiki.

== Works ==
- Quilter, Laura, and Liz Henry. "Aging and Gender in Science Fiction". Women in Science Fiction vol. 2, ed. Robin A. Reid, Greenwood Press, 2009.
- Laura Quilter and Marjorie Heins. "Intellectual Property and Free Speech in the Online World: How Educational Institutions and Other Online Service Providers Are Coping with Cease and Desist Letters and Takedown Notices" Free Expression Project Public Policy Report (2007)
- Quilter, Laura, and Jennifer Urban. "Efficient Process or 'Chilling Effects'? Takedown Notices Under Section 512 of the Digital Millennium Copyright Act", 22 Santa Clara Comp. & High Tech. L.J. 621 (2006)
- L aura Quilter, Nathan Good, John Han, Elizabeth Miles, et al.. "Radio Frequency Id and Privacy with Information Goods" WPES '04 (2004)
