= Liberating Ourselves Locally =

- Abbreviation: LOL!; LOLSpace
- Formation: 2011
- Purpose: Hacking; DIY culture
- Location: US
- Origin: Oakland, California
- Website: Official website

Liberating Ourselves Locally was a makerspace/hackerspace in the Fruitvale district of Oakland, California from 2011 to 2022. It was part of the Bay Area Consortium of Hackerspaces (BACH).

LOL! was a place where people could learn new skills, from soldering to video game design. It operated on the principle that members of the local community could be involved in all aspects of creating things that sustain people, such as food, clothing, energy, technology, shelter, and art.

== History ==
LOL! was founded in 2011 by a group of people including Jen-Mei Wu and software engineer Praveen Sinha.

Mentors from many professional fields volunteered their time to share their professional knowledge. LOL! had close ties with other San Francisco Bay Area hackerspaces including Sudo Room, Noisebridge, and Mothership HackerMoms.

It merged with a local arts nonprofit, Peacock Rebellion, in 2017. Working together with the Oakland Community Land Trust and other nonprofits that rented spaces in the same building, the group of organizations purchased the building they rented. The makerspace closed in 2022 and transferred their space back to the land trust.

== Project areas ==
- Art
- Computer hardware
- Computer programing
- Crafts
- Electronics
- Politics
- Sewing
- Software
- Technology
- Textiles

== See also ==
- Double Union
