= Meinel =

Meinel may refer to:

- Meinel (surname)
- 4065 Meinel, asteroid
