= The Elms School =

The Elms School may refer to the following English schools:

- The Elms School, Colwall, Herefordshire
- The Elms School, Long Eaton, Derbyshire

== See also ==
- The Elms (disambiguation)
