= Shanley Kane =

American technology writer (born 1987)

Shanley Kane is an American technology writer, born in 1987. She was co-founder, CEO and editor of the quarterly technology journal Model View Culture until its cancellation in 2017.

== Life ==
Kane was born and grew up in Minnesota. She attended Columbia College, Chicago, where she studied fiction writing, followed by Carnegie Mellon University, where she studied professional technical writing. On graduating, she moved to San Francisco and began working in technology and software companies in Silicon Valley.

== Journalism ==
In 2013 Kane resigned her position to launch and focus on Model View Culture with her co-founder Amelia Greenhall. The journal focuses on culture in the technology industry, particularly harassment of women who work in the industry and the exclusion of people from minority backgrounds. Kane announced the end of Model View Culture on 7 February 2017, indicating her next project to be a book "that aims to show, through political analysis and personal stories, the corruption, rot and evil of the tech industry empire".

In 2019, Kane uncovered that software company Chef was being paid by U.S. Immigration and Customs Enforcement. Her reporting led to at least one former engineer deleting his code in protest of its use in immigration control.
