= A Gay Girl in Damascus =

Fictional persona used by a fake blog

Amina Abdallah Arraf al Omari
- A Gay Girl in Damascus character
- First appearance: February 19, 2011
- Last appearance: June 6, 2011
- Created by: Thomas Jarvis MacMaster (Tom MacMaster)

In-universe information
- Gender: Female
- Occupation: Teacher
- Religion: Islam
- Nationality: Syrian, US

A Gay Girl in Damascus (February 2011 – June 2011) was a blog purportedly authored by Amina Abdallah Arraf al Omari. Omari was, in fact, a hoax persona created by the American citizen and then-student of the University of Edinburgh, Thomas Jarvis MacMaster. During the 2011 Syrian uprising, a posting on the blog, purportedly by "Amina's" cousin, claimed that the girl had been abducted on June 6, 2011. This sparked a strong outcry from the LGBTQ community and was covered widely in mainstream media.

In the wake of the reports, questions arose regarding the possibility that Arraf al Omari was an elaborate hoax. On June 7, 2011, author/blogger Liz Henry, Andy Carvin (a journalist with NPR in Washington, D.C.), and others raised doubts about the identity of the blogger. The photos purported to be of her were proven to be a Croatian woman residing in Britain, with no relation to Syria, the blog, or the ongoing protests in the country. On June 12, Ali Abunimah and Benjamin Doherty of the website The Electronic Intifada conducted an investigation that pointed to a strong possibility that the identity of Amina was MacMaster, an American living in Edinburgh. Hours later, MacMaster posted on "Amina's" blog and took responsibility for it and the false reports of the girl's capture. He was accused of creating a second hoax persona to defend his first one. MacMaster has since written two e-novels.

== Creation and spread ==
MacMaster created the character Amina Abdallah as a fictional persona or alias; MacMaster said in an interview with NPR that he could not recall when he created the character. NPR stated that it found posts from Amina at the Yahoo! group "alternate-history" dating to February 2006. MacMaster said that he created the Amina character so he could more easily participate in discussions about the Middle East. MacMaster believed that if he used his real name, people would have presumed that he was too closely tied to the United States, but as Amina he would have more credibility.

As Amina, MacMaster posted on various listservs and websites. MacMaster fleshed out the character's background, and he said that he began writing a novel based on the character. Eventually, he created various profiles for Amina at various social networking sites. Originally he used the character to discuss politics of the Middle East and science fiction. In the northern hemisphere fall of 2010, MacMaster moved Amina to Syria. MacMaster said that he was going to stop using the persona by then. Eyder Peralta of NPR stated "But the Arab Spring called her back."

In February 2011, MacMaster posted as Amina on the website Lez Get Real, operated by Bill Graber, a straight man pretending to be a lesbian named Paula Brooks. MacMaster and Graber corresponded, and under the Amina character MacMaster flirted with the Paula character. Graber said that the interaction "was a major sock-puppet hoax crash into a major sock-puppet hoax." As Amina, MacMaster wrote pieces for Lez Get Real.

MacMaster began the blog A Gay Girl in Damascus under the Amina name. The first entry appeared online on February 19, 2011. The publication, known for its commentary on politics, gender, sexuality, and Syrian culture, became, in the words of Nidaa Hassan of The Guardian, "increasingly popular after capturing the imagination of the Syrian opposition as the protest movement struggled in the face of the government crackdown." The blog's tagline was "An out Syrian lesbian's thoughts on life, the universe and so on ..."

The blog gained popularity after an April 26 post titled "My Father the Hero" about two security agents who came to her home to detain her and were kept away by her father. She and he were described as going into hiding soon after, changing locations in Damascus.

In May 2011, Katherine Marsh of The Guardian, then deceived by the hoax, described the blog as "brutally honest, poking at subjects long considered taboo in Arab culture". The character of Amina claimed "Blogging is, for me, a way of being fearless, I believe that if I can be 'out' in so many ways, others can take my example and join the movement."

According to Doherty of The Electronic Intifada, MacMaster had also created social media profiles, including on Facebook, for both Amina and her fictitious cousin Rania, and had used them to correspond with activists for Palestinian and other causes.

According to American bisexual activist and author Minal Hajratwala, MacMaster (as Amina) wrote to Hajratwala in May 2011, asking for advice regarding a book Amina was writing. She said that MacMaster sent a copy of an autobiography of the character and asked Hajratwala to send the text to an agent. Hajratwala said that she, unaware of MacMaster's true identity, did not send the script to an agent because she believed the material was "rambling and in need of a lot of work."

== Blog contents ==
=== Purported biography ===
The character of Amina Abdallah Arraf is a dual Syrian and American citizen, with an American mother and Syrian father. "The Lede Blog" of The New York Times noted that Arraf's draft of her biography indicated "very deep" American roots. She wrote that she was born in Staunton, Virginia in October 1975 to Abdallah Ismail Arraf and Caroline McClure Arraf. The McClures had emigrated to Virginia from Ulster in 1742. Four decades later, Arraf added, her mother's family fought in the American Revolution at Yorktown, "earning me the right to be in the DAR [Daughters of the American Revolution]."

Her family moved to Syria when she was six months old and she grew up between the two countries. She spent a long period in the US after 1982, when an Islamist uprising in Syria was being violently put down. She realized she was gay when she was 15 and it terrified her. After planning to attend Agnes Scott College in Atlanta, she decided not to attend because she was troubled by the number of open lesbians on campus. She came out at 26 and returned to Syria to enjoy a calm life. There she taught English until the uprising closed classes.

Arraf experienced prejudice both in the US and Syria. However, she said she saw no conflict in being both gay and Muslim and described an experience finding other gay women in Syria.

Arraf's position as a dual citizen informed her political and cultural perspective, as did being a lesbian.

=== Homosexuality ===
Homosexual activity is illegal in Syria, and is punishable by at least three years in prison, and it is uncommon for gay Arabs to be open about their sexuality. Although Syria's human rights record is among the worst in the world, according to Human Rights Watch, the character of Amina wrote openly about her sexual orientation, experiences, and aspirations.

In an email interview with CNN, MacMaster wrote as Amina that she believed that political change could improve gay rights.

=== Syrian uprising ===
The character of Amina was working on a book of her writings when she disappeared. She had gained popularity after her blogging about the Syrian opposition movement in the face of the government's crackdown on protests. The media in Western countries first paid attention to the blog around May 2011.

Her family was well-connected with relatives in the government and the Muslim Brotherhood, and being politically active was a "natural thing". However, she stated "Unfortunately, for most of my life being aware of Syrian politics means simply observing and only commenting privately."

Amina had been increasingly critical of the government in the months of the Syrian uprising. In April, Arraf told how her father confronted two security agents who came to arrest her, threatened to rape her, and accused her of being involved in a salafist plot. When unrest broke out, her character described the protests as if she were there.

=== Fictitious account of threats and hiding ===
One of Amina's close online friends, a real person named Sandra Bagaria (who later admitted that she never met Amina in person or virtually) explained on June 7 that Arraf had been hiding in "four or five different apartments in four or five different cities" across Syria since two young men appeared at her home in Damascus several weeks before. "Amina woke up in the middle of the night and saw her father outside talking to two young guys in their early 20s. I think they were there just following orders, they didn't know what they were doing" Bagaria said. The two men eventually left without arresting Arraf al Omari, but "Since that day, we agreed they might come back for her. It was only a matter of time."

In April, before fictionally going into hiding she wrote,"The Syria I always hoped was there, but was sleeping, has woken up ... I have to believe that, sooner or later, we will prevail."

In May 2011, Arraf wrote that she had gone into hiding after her father reported that men had come looking for her. Two weeks later, she blogged that she had been sent a fake message by someone posing as her partner, inviting her to a meeting at a hotel. She also suspected her email accounts had been hacked.

In the weeks before her reported abduction, Amina had described traveling around Syria, sometimes in disguise and once riding inside a box on a truck, Bagaria said. At one point, Amina wore an Islamic head scarf and posed as her father's wife so that they could slip more easily through government checkpoints. "When she was traveling with her father, she was grabbed by a soldier who said 'What is a lovely young girl like you doing with an old man like him?'" Bagaria recalled being told. Although purportedly in hiding and under threats of arrest, the character of Amina continued to write her blog.

Arraf's character wrote that she would not flee Syria, and that activists had to fight for a more open and free country. She also explained her approach to nonviolence.

=== Fictitious abduction ===
The character of Amina Arraf was reportedly kidnapped by three armed men when she was on her way with a friend to a meeting in Damascus to meet with protest organizers around 6:00 pm on June 6, 2011. She was described as walking in the area of the Abbasid bus station near Fares al Khouri Street, on her way to meet a person involved with the Local Coordinating Committee, a real opposition planning group.

On the blog, MacMaster posted as "Rania Ismail", Amina's fictional cousin, reporting the event: "Amina was seized by three men in their early 20s. According to the witness (who does not want her identity known), the men were armed ... Amina hit one of them and told the friend to go find her father. One of the men then put his hand over Amina's mouth and they hustled her into a red Dacia Logan with a window sticker of Basel Assad." Basel is the brother of president Bashar al-Assad.

== Response to abduction ==
The online response in the LGBT community, mainstream media, and social networking websites was rapid and extensive. Facebook pages were set up on June 6 calling for Arraf's release. The Free Amina Arraf Facebook page had already gathered over 10,000 members by the night of June 7; activists tweeted using the hashtag #FreeAmina. On Arraf's blog, MacMaster, writing as Amina's cousin "Ismail", wrote they did not know whether Arraf was in a jail or held elsewhere.

Now Lebanon wrote that Arraf was one of the "ordinary, inspiring heroes of the Syrian revolution", known for "her fearless, blunt accounts of political turmoil in the country, and for her candidness about being gay".

Journalist Andrew Belonsky wrote an article for Death and Taxes magazine, stating the "U.S. government should ... use its power and influence to call for Arraf's release ... Such a statement would of course prove that the U.S. remains committed to freeing citizens held overseas, just as we have in North Korea and Iran, but an official declaration would also send two indispensable messages: international governments must protect free speech, and democratic societies must respect LGBT equality."

The U.S. State Department stated on June 7, 2011, that it was looking into the issue.

== Hoax revealed ==
In the wake of the kidnapping reports, questions were raised about the possibility that not only the kidnapping but Arraf al Omari were an elaborate ongoing hoax. Writer/editor Liz Henry was quoted in the "Middle East Live" blog run by The Guardian saying "I started having doubts based on some of her patterns of talking about personas and fiction ... I would hate to have my existence doubted and am finding it painful to continue doubting Amina's. If she is real, I am very sorry and will apologize and continue to work for her release and support." This possibility was also part of a discussion on the BBC World Service programme World Have Your Say including fellow blogger Andy Carvin, who expressed more confidence that she was real, but admitted the evidence was ambiguous.

Researchers found a prior blog written under the name of Arraf al Omari called Amina's Attempts at Art (And Alliteration) that advertised itself as a mix of fiction and non-fiction: "This blog is ... where I will be posting samples of fiction and literature I am working on. This blog will contain chapters and drafts. This blog will have what may sometimes seem likely deeply personal accounts. And sometimes they will be. But there will also be fiction. And I will not tell you which is which. This blog will sample what I'm writing. This blog is not a diary. This blog is not about politics. This blog invites your comments."

=== Misappropriated photographs ===
On June 8, Jelena Lečić, a Croatian national and expatriate in the United Kingdom, issued a statement that the pictures claiming to represent Arraf al Omari were actually of herself, causing The Guardian and The Huffington Post to expunge, replace or remove photos that had been from the newspaper's past articles.

Lečić, who worked as an administrator at the Royal College of Physicians in London, was made aware of the issue by a friend. She appeared on the BBC's Newsnight to clarify that she had never known of the Syrian woman and that the usage of Lečić's personal images had been going on for some period of time. She stated that having her photograph circulated and associated with someone else — whether that person was real or not — was upsetting for her.

=== Admission ===
On June 12, The Electronic Intifada published evidence for its claims that Amina was the product of Tom MacMaster of Edinburgh, formerly of Atlanta, Georgia. He initially denied this, but later that day the blog was updated with MacMaster's admission that he was the sole author of the blog. The blog post titled "Apology to readers" read:

I never expected this level of attention. While the narrative voice may have been fictional, the facts on this blog are true and not misleading as to the situation on the ground. I do not believe that I have harmed anyone – I feel that I have created an important voice for issues that I feel strongly about. I only hope that people pay as much attention to the people of the Middle East and their struggles in this year of revolutions. The events there are being shaped by the people living them on a daily basis. I have only tried to illuminate them for a western audience.

MacMaster stated in an interview that the kidnapping report was part of a plan to end the blog. He had intended to follow it a few days later with a message saying that Amina "had been released, had left the country and was not going to blog any more".

=== Identity of author ===
Thomas "Tom" MacMaster was raised in Harrisonburg, Virginia. He graduated in 1994 from Emory University in Atlanta, with a bachelor's degree in history. At the time of the blog and its unraveling, he was a postgraduate student at the University of Edinburgh. MacMaster said that few would have paid attention to the blog if he had started it in 2010. Because of the political developments in Syria, people on the internet began to notice the blog. Attention increased after the blog character described her experience with the Syrian state internal police.

On June 24, 2011, the University of Edinburgh released a statement, stating they were "very concerned" about the reported activities of MacMaster and would investigate any misuse of university computing facilities: they would also investigate the matter in the context of Edinburgh University's Dignity and Respect Policy and list of Disciplinary Offences.

== Post-revelation reception ==
Monica Hesse of The Washington Post wrote that upon discovery of the hoax, bloggers, women, gays and lesbians, and Syrians were unhappy, since a blog that claimed to be one of them was written by an American heterosexual male. Hesse explained "If [MacMaster] had not been so emotionally resonant, so detailed, so seemingly 'real,' nobody would have cared so much when Amina disappeared, and nobody would have worked so hard to figure out what might have happened to her, and nobody would have learned that she was a pale man from Georgia. Which meant that, at least according to a chilling and narrow definition of what it means to be real on the Internet, Tom MacMaster was very good indeed at being Amina."

Liz Henry, who had recommended some of the posts made by MacMaster when he worked under the Amina character, stated "He's stealing the voice of a marginalized person. His way of describing what it's like to be gay in the Middle East goes down smooth with people who have a progressive bent. Why did I jump to this blog — just because it was a person who shares some of my values?"

Minal Hajratwala, upon discovering the real identity of Tom MacMaster, re-examined the fictional biography draft he sent her with more scrutiny. Robert Mackey of The New York Times stated that Hajratwala's second assessment of the writing was "scathing". Hajratwala stated "The faked lesbian sex scenes turn my stomach. The narcissistic writing, the sprinkling of quotations from the Koran and tidbits from Syrian history, the stock stories compiled from a thousand news clippings — it all seems painfully obvious." Hajratwala posted the manuscript from MacMaster online so readers could look at it. MacMaster asked Hajratwala to take the manuscript down and threatened legal action. Hajratwala refused to remove the writings, posted the e-mails MacMaster sent her, and asked readers to copy and disseminate the Amina story draft. MacMaster later said he had apologized to Hajratwala "for any hurt feelings" in a letter.

Brian Whitaker of The Guardian stated that the blog "was an arrogant fantasy" that "undermines, rather than illuminates, awareness of the realities of being gay in the Middle East." Whitaker added that "Living a fantasy life on your own blog is one thing, but giving an interview to CNN while posing as a representative of the region's gay people appears arrogant and offensive, and surely a prime example of the 'liberal Orientalism' that MacMaster claims to decry."

According to Benjamin Doherty of The Electronic Intifada, MacMaster's use of Facebook and other social media to "infiltrate" the networks of political activists made such activists suspicious and uncomfortable.

== Documentary and popular culture ==
- Canadian documentary filmmaker Sophie Deraspe's 2015 documentary film The Amina Profile explores the case through the perspective of Sandra Bagaria, the Montreal woman who was in an online relationship with Amina and became involved in the international attempt to "rescue" Amina after her purported abduction, only for the truth to arise afterwards that the blog was a hoax and that Amina had never really existed.
- Episode 15 of season 3 of The Good Wife, titled "Live from Damascus", features a Syrian blog titled "Pink Damascus", supposedly created by a Syrian lesbian; investigation reveals to be created by a male from Kansas.

== See also ==
- sciencing_bi, another LGBTQ person who turned out to be a hoax
- Iraq the model, a blog about the Iraq War
- List of fictitious people
- On the Internet, nobody knows you're a dog
- LGBT rights by country or territory#Western Asia
- LGBT in Islam
- Syrian Civil War
