= Aden Meinel =

American astronomer (1922–2011)

Aden B. Meinel
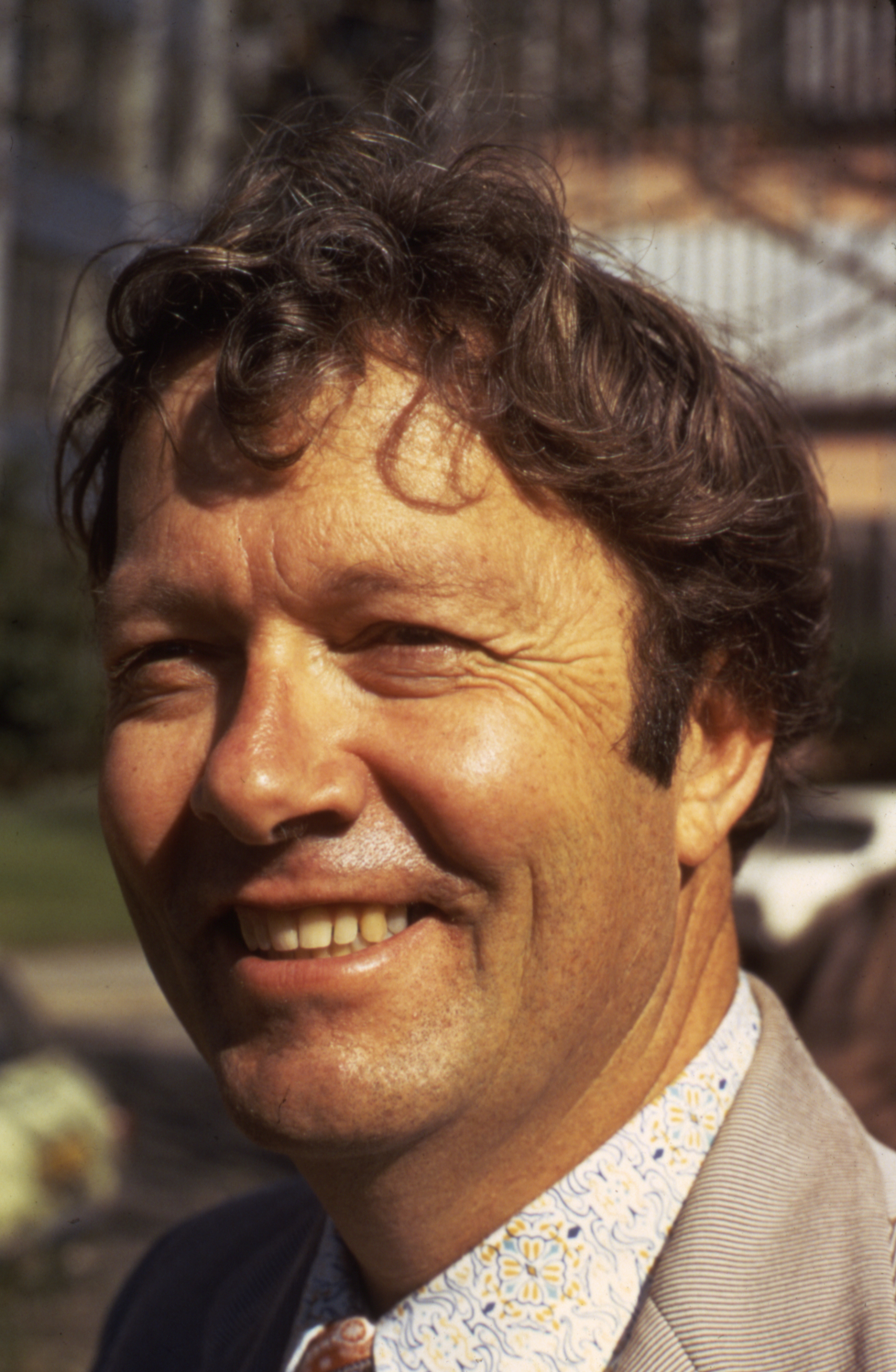
- Meinel in 1973
- Born: 25 November 1922
- Died: 3 October 2011 (aged 88)
- Education: University of California, Berkeley
- Spouse: Marjorie Meinel (m. 1944; died 2008)
- Children: 7, including Carolyn and Mary
- Relatives: Valerie Aurora (granddaughter); Jerry Newport (son-in-law); Keith Henson (ex-son-in-law); Edison Pettit (father-in-law); Hannah Steele Pettit (mother-in-law)
- Awards: Helen B. Warner Prize for Astronomy (1954); Frederic Ives Medal (1980); George Van Biesbroeck Prize (1990)
- Scientific career
- Workplaces: Jet Propulsion Laboratory; University of Arizona College of Optical Sciences

Aden B. Meinel (November 25, 1922 – October 3, 2011) was an American astronomer. He retired in 1993 as a distinguished scientist at the Jet Propulsion Laboratory. He also held the rank of professor emeritus at the University of Arizona College of Optical Sciences. His research interests have included upper atmospheric physics, glass technology, optical design, instrumentation and space systems.

Meinel received his Ph.D. from the University of California, Berkeley, in 1949. His dissertation is titled A Spectrographic Study of the Night Sky and Aurora in the Near Infrared. In 1944 he married astronomer Marjorie Steele Pettit who became his research partner. They had seven children together.

He received the Optical Society's Adolph Lomb Medal in 1952. In 1954, he was awarded the Helen B. Warner Prize for Astronomy by the American Astronomical Society. He was a Fellow and president of the Optical Society of America in 1972, and was awarded the Frederic Ives Medal in 1980. He received the George Van Biesbroeck Prize in 1990.

In 2022 a biography of Meinel and Marjorie was published by Oxford University Press, titled With Stars in Their Eyes: The Extraordinary Lives and Enduring Genius of Aden and Marjorie Meinel.

== Telescopes ==
During his career, Meinel was involved in the design and construction of several large telescopes, including:

- 36-inch (910 mm) telescope, McDonald Observatory
- 36-inch (910 mm) and 85-inch (2,200 mm) telescopes, Kitt Peak National Observatory
- Relocation of the 36-inch (910 mm) telescope, Steward Observatory
- 90-inch (2.3 m) telescope, Steward Observatory
- 48-inch (1.2 m) telescope, Osmania University, Hyderabad, India
- 186-inch (4.7 m) equivalent Multiple Mirror Telescope
- 24-inch (610 mm) telescope, National Central University, Chung-Li, Taiwan, Republic of China

== Publications ==
Aden Meinel's publications include:

- The Near-Infrared Spectrum of the Night Sky and Aurora, Publications of the Astronomical Society of the Pacific, Vol. 60, No. 357, p. 373
- On the Spectrum of Lightning in the Venus Atmosphere, Publications of the Astronomical Society of the Pacific, Vol. 74, No. 439, p. 329
- Automatic Optical Designing for Astronomy, Publications of the Astronomical Society of the Pacific, Vol. 77, No. 455, p. 136
- Catalog of Emission Lines in Astrophysical Objects, Optical Sciences Center Technical Report 27, June 1968, 195 pp.
- Power for the People, McDonnell-Douglas Corporation, 1971, 280 pp. *LOC# TJ810.M44
- Applied Solar Energy: An Introduction, Addison-Wesley, 1976, 650 pp.
- Sunsets, Twilights, and Evenings Skies, Cambridge University Press, 1983, 163 pp. ISBN 978-0521252201
- Telescope Structures - An Evolutionary Overview, Structural mechanics of optical systems II; Proceedings of the Meeting, Los Angeles, CA, Jan. 13-15, 1987, Society of Photo-Optical Instrumentation Engineers
- Aden B. Meinel publications

== Honors ==
- Founding Director Optical Sciences Center & Professor Emeritus, University of Arizona
- SPIE Meinel Commemorative Technical Conference Sept. 22, 2003
- Asteroid 4065 Meinel is named in his honor.

== See also ==
- Optical Society of America#Past Presidents of the OSA
