= Lez Get Real =

Lesbian news website

Lez Get Real was a news site for lesbian audiences that operated between 2008 and 2014.

The website was founded in 2008. The founder operated the website as "Paula Brooks," and pretended to be a lesbian, as well as deaf to deflect suspicion about being unable to use the phone to talk to journalists. In 2011, after it was revealed that the self-described Syrian lesbian blogger Amina Abdallah Arraf al Omari was actually a hoax by an American man, Tom MacMaster, "Brooks" revealed himself as Bill Graber, a retired construction worker from Ohio. The revelation came one day after MacMaster was revealed.

After the Lez Get Real hoax was revealed, reaction from the lesbian community was negative. Judy Dlugacz, the founder and owner of Olivia, a travel company catering to lesbians, described the hoax as an "outrage." Suzanne Goldenberg said that the lesbian community on the Internet was "a small world" and that "there are relatively few general news sites run by lesbians, and for some writers LezGetReal offered a chance to break into writing. Within those close circles, a number of people said they felt betrayed."

The site continued to operate under new ownership.

At the end of 2014, Lez Get Real shut down due to a combination of financial reasons and burn out among the remaining writers. The writers and editors released a statement regarding the closure of the website, which is no longer available.
