= Double Union =

Hacker/maker space in San Francisco

Coordinates: 37.7506°N 122.3956°W

- DU's logo is a Unicode symbol with two nested sets

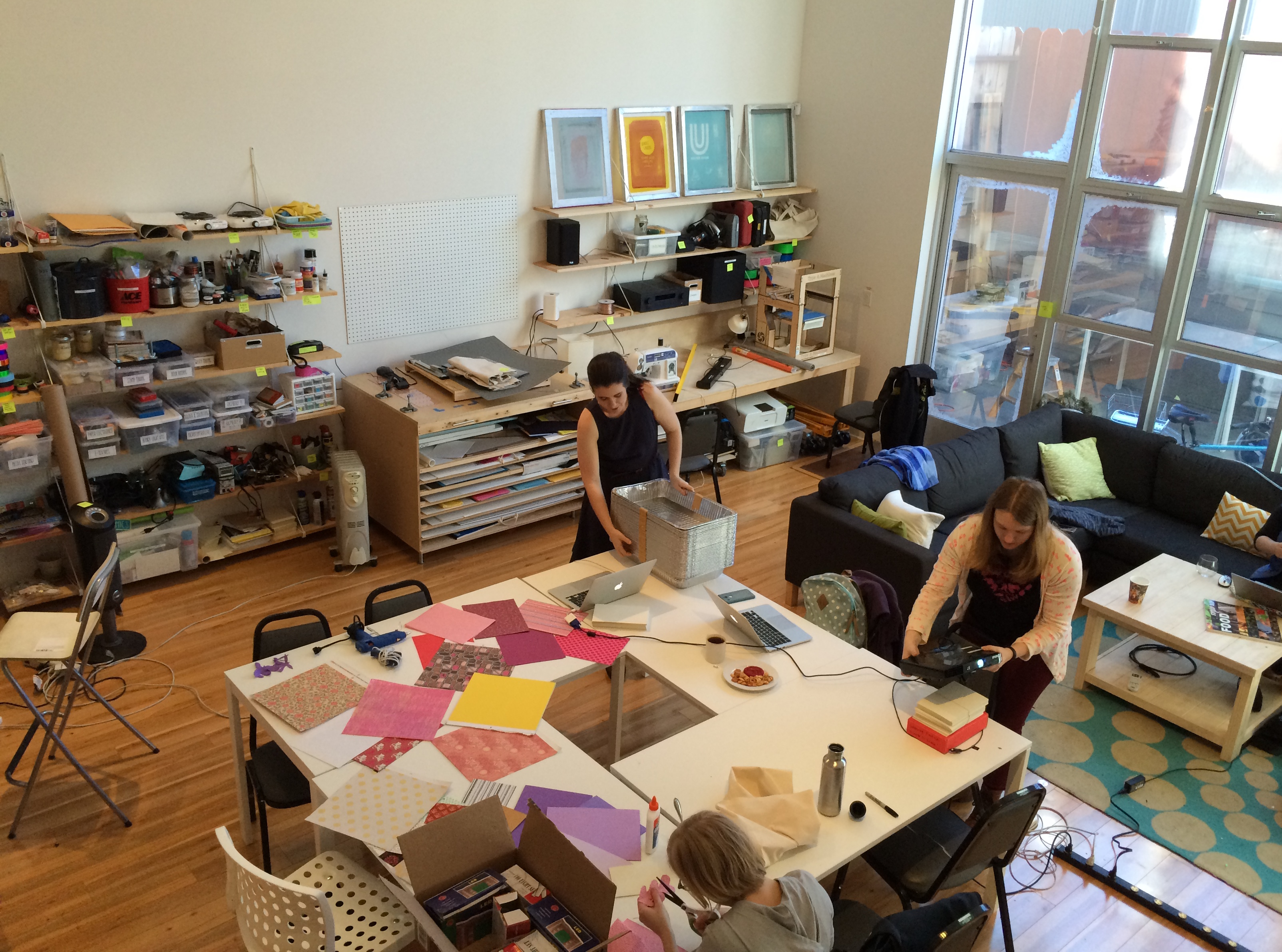
- A paper workshop at Double Union
- Abbreviation: DU
- Formation: 2013
- Purpose: Hacking, Feminism, DIY culture
- Location: San Francisco, California, US
- Members: 150–200
- Founders: Liz Henry, Valerie Aurora, Amelia Greenhall, and others on founding committee
- Website: Official website

Double Union is a San Francisco hacker/maker space. Double Union was founded by women in 2013 with the explicit goal of fostering a creative safe space. The organization's mission is to be a community workshop where women and nonbinary people can work on projects in a comfortable, welcoming environment.

Members hold public and members-only events for activities and workshops like zine making, paper circuits and electronics, coding, sewing, three-dimensional printing, lightning talks, print making and many others. Key-carrying members are allowed to invite guests of any gender.

== History ==
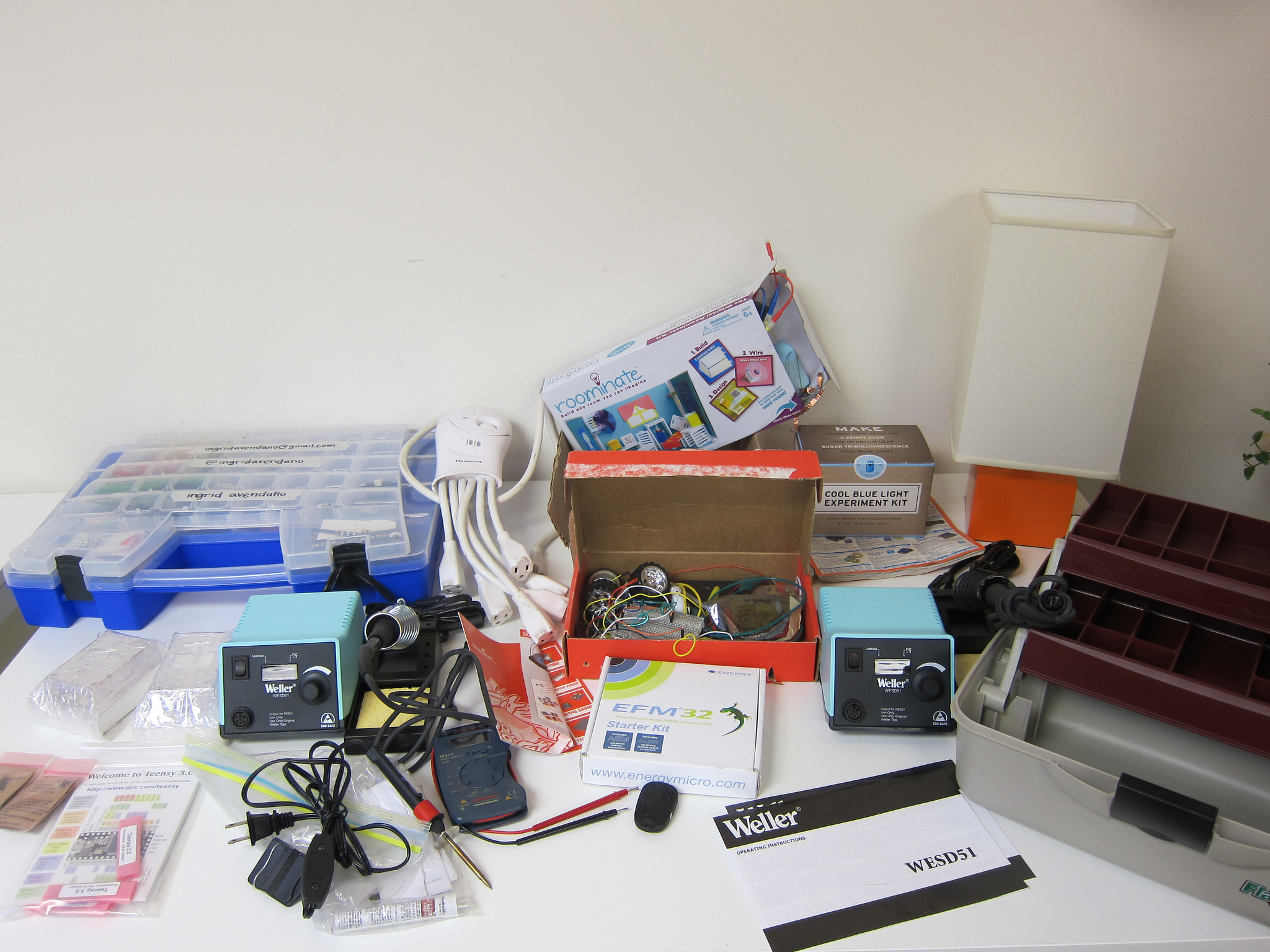
Tools and supplies

DU was founded in 2013 by a group of about ten women including Amelia Greenhall, Valerie Aurora, Liz Henry and Ari Lacenski from their connections at other hackerspaces; at The Ada Initiative's feminist unconference, AdaCamp; and through Geekfeminism.org, collecting initial funding through an Indiegogo campaign. Later that year, Lacenski left the group, claiming that two unnamed cofounders practiced a form of activism that she considered too aggressive. There is a board of directors and a structure in place for voting in new members; as of 2015, there are around 150–200 members.

DU's logo is a bright pink Unicode character (U+22D3), from the Mathematical Operators block.

Originally located in the Mission district at 14th and Mission in the Fog Building, Double Union relocated to the Potrero Hill neighborhood of San Francisco in fall 2015 after their building was sold by the landlord. To fund the move and several equipment purchases, Double Union undertook an Indiegogo campaign, which finished at 106 percent of its goal. They stayed in Potero Hill until September 2020, when they temporarily closed due to the pandemic. In September 2021, they reopened at a new location in SOMA, and later moved back to the Mission District.

== Projects ==
=== App ===
Several Double Union members have created an app for managing hackerspace membership applications, Arooo. Arooo is free to use and is licensed under the GNU GPL.

=== ODD ===
Double Union created the Open Diversity Data project. The project aggregates diversity data for a wide array of tech companies.

== See also ==
- Liberating Ourselves Locally
- Mothership HackerMoms
- Noisebridge
