= Amelia Greenhall =

American feminist and technology blogger

- Born: Amelia Cousins
- Education: Vanderbilt University; University of Washington (MS)
- Occupation: Executive Director of Double Union
- Known for: Feminist tech blogging
- Notable work: Model View Culture, Open Review Quarterly
- Spouse: Adam Greenhall
- Website: Official website

Amelia Cousins Greenhall is an American feminist tech blogger. She cofounded feminist tech blog and publication Model View Culture with Shanley Kane. Greenhall is co-founder and Executive Director of Double Union, a feminist women-and-non-binary-people-only hackerspace in San Francisco, with Valerie Aurora, and is a Quantified Self enthusiast. Greenhall is the publisher and co-founder of Open Review Quarterly, a literary journal on modern culture (founded in September 2010).

Prior to co-founding Model View Culture in November 2013, Greenhall was a user experience designer, user interface designer and data scientist in Seattle. She left Model View Culture in May 2014.

Born in Hawaii and raised in Arizona, Greenhall is a 2009 studio art and electrical engineering graduate of Vanderbilt University in Tennessee. She went on to earn a master's degree in public health at the University of Washington.
