= Elmdale =

Elmdale may refer to:

== Places ==
United States

- Elmdale, Indiana
- Elmdale, Kansas
- Elmdale, Michigan
- Elmdale, Minnesota
- Elmdale Township, Morrison County, Minnesota

== See also ==
- Elmsdale (disambiguation)
