= Minal Hajratwala =

American poet

Minal Hajratwala (born 1971) is a writer, performer, poet, and queer activist of Indian descent. She was born in 1971 in San Francisco, California, US, and was raised in New Zealand and suburban Michigan. She is a graduate of Stanford University.

== Career ==
She is the author of Leaving India: My Family's Journey From Five Villages to Five Continents (Houghton Mifflin Harcourt, 2009), which Alice Walker has called "incomparable," and The Washington Post has characterized as "searingly honest." She researched and wrote the book during a seven-year period, traveling the world to interview more than 75 members of her extended family.

Hajratwala's creative work has appeared in journals, anthologies, and theater spaces and has received recognition and support from the Sundance Institute, the Jon Sims Center for the Arts, the SerpentSource Foundation, and the Hedgebrook writing retreat for women, where she serves on the Alumnae Leadership Council. For World AIDS Day in 1999, the Asian Art Museum of San Francisco commissioned her one-woman show, "Avatars: Gods for a New Millennium."

She previously worked as a journalist at the San Jose Mercury News for eight years, was a board member of the National Lesbian and Gay Journalists Association, and was a National Arts Journalism Program fellow at Columbia University's Graduate School of Journalism in 2000–01.

In June 2011 Hajratwala and Tom MacMaster, creator of Amina Abdallah Arraf al Omari, engaged in an online dispute over the posting of MacMaster's manuscript.

Hajratwala is the founder of Unicorn Club, which is self-described as, "a magical sanctuary where authors of color (and allies who really mean it!) finish our gorgeous, urgently needed books."

== Works ==
- 2009 Leaving India: My Family's Journey from Five Villages to Five Continents
- 2010 Out! Stories from The New Queer India (editor)
- 2015 Bountiful Instructions for Enlightenment
