= Elm (disambiguation) =

An elm is a tree of the Genus Ulmus.

Elm or ELM may also refer to:

== Places ==
=== Canada ===
- Elm Tree, Ontario

=== Germany ===
- Elm (hills)

=== Switzerland ===
- Elm, Switzerland, a village in the Canton of Glarus

=== United Kingdom ===
- Elm, Cambridgeshire, a village in Cambridgeshire, England

=== United States ===
- Elm, Missouri, an unincorporated community
- Elm, Pennsylvania, an unincorporated community
- Elm Township, Gage County, Nebraska, a township

== Facilities and structures ==
- East London Mosque, in London, England, UK
- Elmira Corning Regional Airport, in New York, US

== Science and technology ==
- Edge-localized mode
- Elaboration likelihood model
- Eukaryotic Linear Motif resource, a database on patterns in protein sequences
- Export Land Model, a model for the decline of a country's oil exports
- Extended Lunar Modules, in the Apollo program

=== Computing ===
- Elm (email client)
- Elm (programming language)
- European Logarithmic Microprocessor
- Extreme learning machine

== People ==
- Christina Elm (born 1995), Danish handball player
- David Elm (footballer) (b. 1983), Swedish footballer
- Rasmus Elm (b. 1988), Swedish footballer
- Steven Elm (b. 1975), Canadian speed skater
- Viktor Elm (b. 1985), Swedish footballer

=== Fictional characters ===
- Professor Elm, a fictional character in the Pokémon franchise

== Other uses ==
- Elm (album), a 1979 album by jazz pianist Richard Beirach
- Elm (poem), a 1965 poem by Sylvia Plath
- elm, ISO 639-3 code of the Eleme language

== See also ==
- EL/M-2084, an Israeli ground-based radar system
- EL/M-2238 STAR, an Israeli naval radar system
- Elms (disambiguation)
- Elm Creek (disambiguation)
- Elm River (disambiguation)
- Elm Street (disambiguation)
