= Export Land Model =

The Export Land Model, or Export-Land Model, refers to work done by Dallas geologist Jeffrey Brown, building on the work of others, and discussed widely on The Oil Drum. It models the decline in oil exports that result when an exporting nation experiences both a peak in oil production and an increase in domestic oil consumption. In such cases, exports decline at a far faster rate than the decline in oil production alone.

The Export Land Model is important to petroleum importing nations because when the rate of global petroleum production peaks and begins to decline, the petroleum available on the world market will decline much more steeply than the decline in total production.

== Theory ==
As world oil exports approach (or pass) a global peak, the price of exported oil increases and further stimulates domestic economic growth and oil consumption in Export-Land countries, creating a positive feedback process between declining exports and higher prices. Eventually, however, the level of export decline outpaces the increasing oil price, slowing domestic growth. In some cases, an Export Land eventually becomes a net importer. It is unlikely that an Export Land would constrain domestic consumption to help importing countries. In fact, many oil exporting countries subsidize domestic consumption below price levels defined by the international markets.

== Hypothetical example ==
Given a hypothetical oil producing country (known by the model as an Export Land) that produces 2 Mbbl/d (320,000 m^{3}/d), consumes 1 Mbbl/d (160,000 m^{3}/d), and exports 1 Mbbl/d (160,000 m^{3}/d) to oil consuming countries around the world, the model would be applied as such (illustrated in the graph above):

Export Land hits the point of Peak Oil production, and over a five-year period production drops by 25%. Over the same time period, Export Land's consumption increases by 20% to 1.2 mbpd. This causes Export Land's net exports over the five-year period to fall from 1 mbpd to 0.3 mbpd, a decrease of 70% -- resulting from a combination of increasing domestic consumption in Export Land and a 25% drop in production. Counter-intuitively, the fractional decline in exports is much greater than the sum of the fractional increase in domestic consumption and the fractional decline in production.

== See also ==
- Energy development
- Energy security
- Oil price increases since 2003
- Oil reserves
- World energy resources and consumption
