= Mothership HackerMoms =

Hackerspace/makerspace in Berkeley, CA

- Formation: 2011
- Purpose: Hacking, Feminism, DIY culture
- Location: US
- Origin: Berkeley, California
- Founders: Sho Sho Smith and others on founding committee
- Website: mothership.hackermoms.org

Mothership HackerMoms is a nonprofit hackerspace/makerspace in Berkeley, California, founded in 2011. It was the first all-women hackerspace.

The 1000-square-foot space provides space for members to work on projects and hold events while their children are onsite with child care. They have participated in DIY culture events such as Maker Faire, Bizarre Bazaar, and Oakland Art Murmur, and have access to another San Francisco Bay Area hackerspace, Ace Monster Toys. The members define Mothership HackerMoms as a hackerspace deliberately to include themselves in the open source and free culture movements. Members have held workshops on how to use Drupal and Illustrator, how to lay a resin coating on a canvas, done painting, drawing, photography, and made linoprints.

== See also ==
- Double Union
- Noisebridge
