= Elms Hotel =

Elms Hotel may refer to:

- Elms Hotel (Excelsior Springs, Missouri), listed on the NRHP in Missouri
- Elms Hotel (Abilene, Kansas), listed on the NRHP in Kansas
