= Stratosolar =

American energy company

- Type: Private
- Industry: Solar power
- Founded: 2008
- Headquarters: 2880 Zanker Road ste 203, San Jose, CA, 95134 United States
- Area served: Worldwide
- Key people: Edmund Kelly (President)
- Products: solar (PV) kites
- Website: stratosolar.com

Stratosolar is a startup corporation created to develop buoyant stratospheric platforms for collecting solar energy.

The current concept, "StratoSolar PV" envisions photovoltaic cells lifted above the clouds by means of lighter-than-air gas bags, with up to 3.5X more power produced (per unit area) than ground-based solar arrays due to better exposure and also lower operating temperature.

The original concept was to concentrate and direct light concentrated by a buoyant cassegrain reflector telescope structure down a buoyant reflective pipe to the ground for use in conventional steam turbine power generation
