= Wyant College of Optical Sciences =

Division of the University of Arizona

Coordinates: 32°13′53″N 110°56′49″W

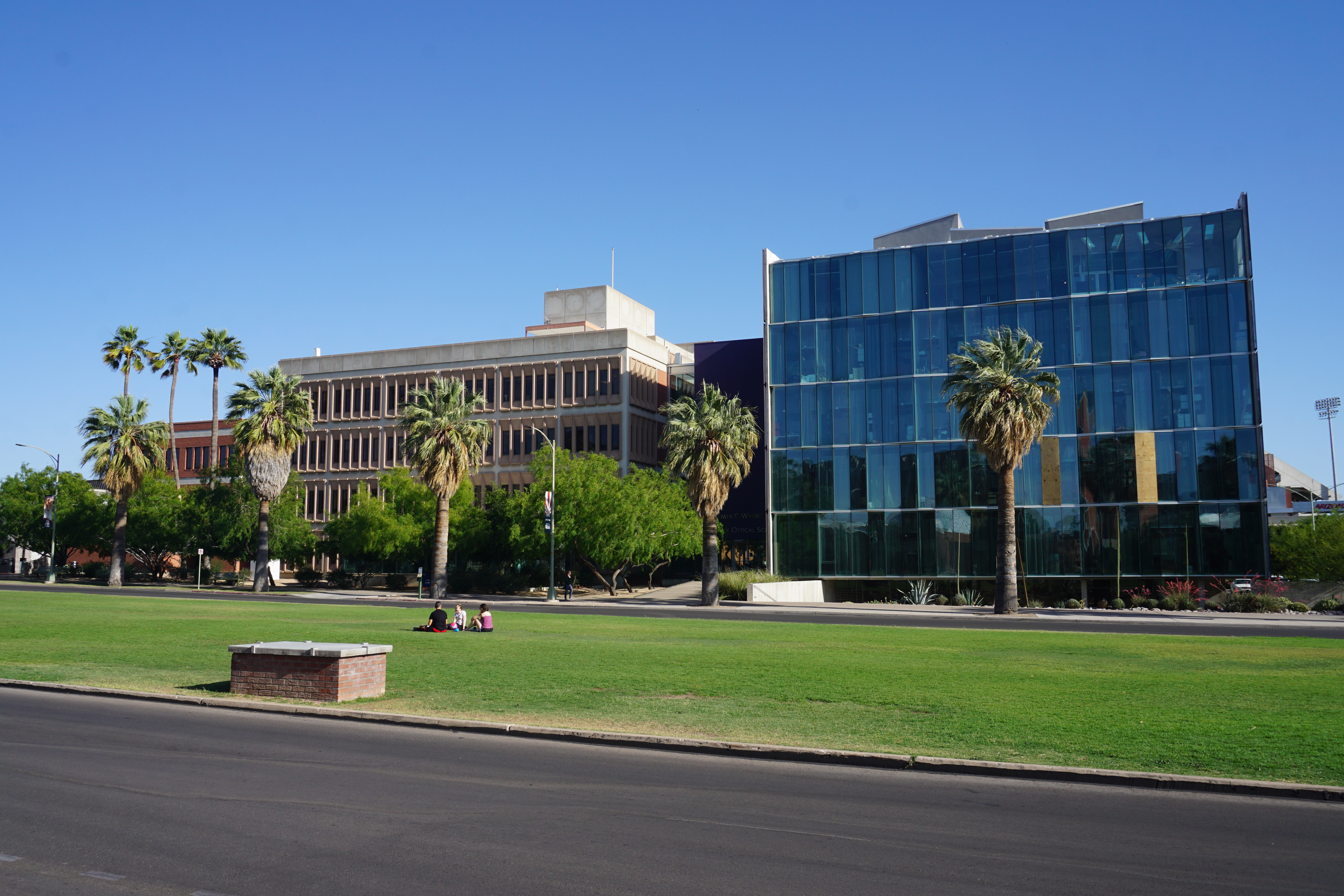
Meinel Optical Sciences building, Tucson

The University of Arizona College of Optical Sciences, considered the largest institute for optics education in the United States, is dedicated to research and education in optics with an emphasis on optical engineering. The college offers more than 90 courses in optical sciences, and a Bachelor of Science degree in Optical Sciences and Engineering, Masters and Doctoral degree programs in Optical Sciences, as well as a dual master's degree in Optical Sciences and Business Administration. The college also offers comprehensive distance learning courses leading to a Professional Graduate Certificate or a master's degree and markets non-credit short courses on DVD to optics professionals.

== History ==
The creation of the Optical Sciences Center, as the college was formerly known, was proposed by the Air Force Institute of Technology, together with the needs in Optics Committee of the Optical Society of America and Dr. Aden Meinel, Director of Steward Observatory at the University of Arizona in the early 1960s. The center was established in 1964 thanks to the financial support of the University of Arizona Foundation with Dr. Aden Meinel as its first director. The first research contracts given to the college came from the United States Air Force. Today, the college has partnerships with more than 40 corporations.

== Notable faculty ==
The College of Optical Sciences faculty include many of the leaders in optics, photonics, and applied physics.

- Professor James C. Wyant: Leader in the field of optical metrology, founder of several optics companies, former president of Optica.
- Professor Nicolaas Bloembergen: 1981 Physics Nobel Laureate, pioneered the field of non-linear optics.
- Professor Micheal Marcellin: Regents Professor, co-leader of the JPEG2000 group, paved the way for modern developments in image and video compression techniques.
- Professor Hyatt M. Gibbs: Leader in the field of semi-conductor quantum optics.
- Professor Peter Franken: First experimental demonstrator of second-harmonic generation.
- Professor Willis Lamb: 1955 Nobel Laureate in Physics (former faculty) discoverer of Lamb shift.
- Professor Harrison Hooker Barrett: National Academy of Engineering. Published several advances in the field of imaging.

== Notable alumni ==
- Jack Jewell (Ph.D.) Inventor of vertical-cavity surface-emitting laser (VCSEL)
- Eustace L. Dereniak (Ph.D.) Professor of Optical Sciences at The University of Arizona; Fellow of Optica and SPIE, Former president of SPIE, OSA Esther Hoffman Beller Medal.
- C. Lee Giles, (Ph.D.) David Reese Professor of Information Sciences and Technology, Professor of Computer Science and Engineering, Professor of Supply Chain and Information Systems, Pennsylvania State University; Fellow of the ACM, IEEE and INNS; Gabor Award from the International Neural Network Society (INNS).
- Arthur F. Gmitro, (Ph.D.) Professor of Radiology and Optical Sciences at The University of Arizona; SPIE Rudolph Kingslake award and the IPMI Francois Erbsmann prize.

== Research ==
The college offers research opportunities in many areas including

- Computational optics
- Fiber Optics
- Lasers and Advanced Optical Materials
- Medical Optics and Image Science
- Nanotechnology
- Optical Data Storage
- Optical Engineering and Testing
- Optical Design and Fabrication
- Optoelectronics
- Quantum Nano-Optics of Semiconductors
- Quantum Optics
- Remote Sensing
- Semiconductor Optical Physics
- Telecommunications
- Thin films
- Polarization
- Quantum network
- Quantum Sensing
- Cavity optomechanics
