= Daniel Elms =

- Born: Daniel Elms; October 1985 (age 41); Kingston upon Hull, England
- Genres: Contemporary Classical; Electroacoustic
- Occupation: Composer
- Instruments: Guitar, Electronics
- Labels: New Amsterdam Records, NMC Recordings
- Website: www.danielelms.co.uk

Daniel Elms (born October 1985) is a British composer of contemporary classical and electroacoustic music.

== Early life and education ==
Elms was born in Kingston upon Hull and began composing as a teenager while studying the guitar. He was awarded a scholarship by the Royal College of Music to study under Kenneth Hesketh, Joseph Horovitz, Peter Stark, and Carlos Bonell. His study was supported by the Arts and Humanities Research Council, and the Countess of Munster Musical Trust. Elms is the recipient of the "Emerging Excellence" Award 2013 from the Musicians' Benevolent Fund.

== Musical style ==
Elms has described his own work as "post genre": a musical style that is as likely to use principles of contemporary classical composition as it is to draw upon the instrumentation or aesthetics of electronica, punk, or any other genre. This prism-like perspective of influence and instrumentation is notable in Elms' debut album Islandia, particularly the work Bethia, composed for Hull City of Culture 2017, in which he uses an abstraction of traditional sea shanties, sung by a male choir, which is offset by the contrapuntal chimes of a carillon and a piano, the ambience of sustained chords played by a synthesiser, and, in the latter half of the work, a strident — sometimes dissonant — trumpet. All of this is accompanied by a projection of collaged and superimposed archival film, taken from the British Film Institute and assembled into a new form by videographer David Briggs.

In Elms' music there is a focus on timbre and the time "in between notes"; he sacrifices melody and accompaniment in favour of texture and impressionism, which, with the assistance of found sounds — in a manner similar to musique concrète — is often evocative of environments or landscapes. The influence of "found art" is evident not only in the instrumentation of Elms' work, but in the subjects upon which his work is based, and from which he derives the harmonic content and integrity of his music.

== Career ==
Elms' debut album Islandia was released in 2019 on New Amsterdam Records. He mixed and produced the record, which was recorded at Abbey Road Studios. The album was written while Elms was in residence at the home of composer Imogen Holst.

BBC Radio 3 has featured Elms' music on shows by Hannah Peel, Elizabeth Alker, and Sara Mohr-Pietsch. His music has been performed at venues including the Royal Festival Hall, Kings Place, Invisible Wind Factory, and the Stoller Hall. In 2015 Elms was commissioned by the British Film Institute to create Bethia for Hull City of Culture 2017 as part of PRS Foundation's New Music Biennial. The work premiered at Hull Minster on 30 June 2017, with a second performance at the Royal Festival Hall on 7 July 2017; a recording of the work was released by NMC Records. Manchester Collective commissioned Elms in 2018 to create 100 Demons for string quartet and tape. The work, influenced by Hyakki Yagyō and the political turmoil of 2016–18, showcases Elms' combination of subject, electroacoustic instrumentation, and found sound. The work was performed across two national UK tours in 2018. In 2019 the BBC Concert Orchestra, in partnership with BBC Radio 3's Unclassified Live, commissioned a new orchestral work from Elms. The Royal Philharmonic Society commissioned Elms in 2020 to create a new work for dance, The Age of Spiritual Machines, with choreographer Alexander Whitley.

Elms recorded, produced and mixed the "distressingly brutal" debut album What is Imposed Must be Endured by doom metal band Blind Monarch. Elms wrote additional music for the 2017 TV series Taboo by Ridley Scott and Tom Hardy; the show and its lead composer, Max Richter, were nominated for an Emmy Award for Original Dramatic Score in 2017. Elms has also worked with Max Richter on the film Never Look Away, Promise at Dawn, and the HBO adaptation of Eleanor Ferrante's My Brilliant Friend. In 2020 Elms was music editor on HBO series Industry with original music by DJ Nathan Micay. Elms composed music for Plaques and Tangles at Royal Court Theatre in 2015.

== Musical works ==
- The Age of Spiritual Machines (2020)
- 100 Demons (2018)
- Soft Machines (2017)
- Islandia (2017)
- The Old Declarn (2017)
- North Sea Quartet (2017)

== Discography ==
Year	Title	Details
2019	Islandia (NWAM114)	Released: 21 June 2019; Label: New Amsterdam Records; Format: 12" Vinyl, CD, Digital
