= 4065 Meinel =

Main-belt asteroid

Discovery
- Discovered by: C. J. van Houten; I. van Houten; T. Gehrels
- Discovery site: Palomar Obs.
- Discovery date: 24 September 1960

Designations
- Named after: Aden Meinel (American astronomer)
- Alternative designations: 2820 P-L · 1976 JF_{6} 1986 GQ_{1}
- Minor planet category: main-belt inner

Orbital characteristics
- Epoch 4 September 2017 (JD 2458000.5)
- Uncertainty parameter 0
- Observation arc: 63.81 yr (23,306 days)
- Aphelion: 2.4404 AU
- Perihelion: 2.0932 AU
- Semi-major axis: 2.2668 AU
- Eccentricity: 0.0766
- Orbital period (sidereal): 3.41 yr (1,247 days)
- Mean anomaly: 133.39°
- Mean motion: 0° 17^{m} 19.68^{s} / day
- Inclination: 5.1640°
- Longitude of ascending node: 22.788°
- Argument of perihelion: 102.54°

Physical characteristics
- Dimensions: 3.873±0.075 km
- Geometric albedo: 0.270±0.021
- Absolute magnitude (H): 14.1

4065 Meinel, provisional designation 2820 P-L, is an asteroid from the inner regions of the asteroid belt, approximately 4 kilometers in diameter. It was discovered on 24 September 1960, by Dutch astronomer couple Ingrid and Cornelis van Houten on photographic plates taken by Dutch–American astronomer Tom Gehrels at Palomar Observatory, California. The asteroid was named for American astronomer Aden Meinel.

== Orbit and classification ==
The S-type asteroid is a member of the Flora family, one of the largest groups of stony asteroids in the main-belt. It orbits the Sun in the inner main-belt at a distance of 2.1–2.4 AU once every 3 years and 5 months (1,247 days). Its orbit has an eccentricity of 0.08 and an inclination of 5° with respect to the ecliptic. A first precovery was taken at the discovering observatory in 1953, extending Meinel's observation arc by 7 years prior to its discovery.

== Physical characteristics ==
=== Rotation period ===
According to the survey carried out by NASA's Wide-field Infrared Survey Explorer with its subsequent NEOWISE mission, Meinel measures 3.87 kilometers in diameter and its surface has an albedo of 0.270. As of 2016, the asteroid's composition, shape and rotation period remains unknown.

=== Diameter and albedo ===
The survey designation "P-L" stands for Palomar–Leiden, named after Palomar and Leiden Observatory, which collaborated on the fruitful Palomar–Leiden survey in the 1960s. Gehrels used Palomar's Samuel Oschin telescope (also known as the 48-inch Schmidt Telescope), and shipped the photographic plates to Ingrid and Cornelis van Houten at Leiden Observatory where astrometry was carried out. The trio are credited with the discovery of several thousand minor planets.

== Naming ==
This minor planet was named in honor of the American physicist and astronomer Aden Meinel (1922–2011). The official naming citation was published by the Minor Planet Center on 18 February 1992 (M.P.C. 19695).
