= The Oil Drum =

Energy discussion website

- Owners: Institute for the Study of Energy and Our Future (a 501(c) organization)
- Creators: Professors Kyle Saunders and Dave Summers
- Website: www.theoildrum.com
- Commercial: No
- Launched: March 2005
- Current status: Ceased publishing August 31, 2013; Archives available
- Content license: Attribution-ShareAlike 3.0 United States

The Oil Drum was a website devoted to analysis and discussion of energy and its impact on society that described itself as an "energy, peak oil & sustainability research and news site". The Oil Drum was published by the Institute for the Study of Energy and Our Future, a Colorado non-profit corporation. The site was a resource for information on many energy and sustainability topics, including peak oil, and related concepts such as oil megaprojects, Hubbert linearization, and the Export Land Model. The Oil Drum had over 25 online contributors from all around the globe. In 2013, the site ceased publishing new articles. As of October 2016, the site continues to function as an archive.

The Oil Drum was rated one of the top five sustainability blogs of 2007 by Nielsen Netratings, and was read by a diverse collection of public figures, including Roscoe Bartlett, Paul Krugman, James Howard Kunstler, Richard Rainwater, and Radiohead. In 2008, the site received the M. King Hubbert Award for Excellence in Energy Education from the U.S. chapter of the Association for the Study of Peak Oil and Gas (ASPO).

The Oil Drum was started in March 2005 by Kyle Saunders (username "Prof. Goose"), a professor of political science at Colorado State University, and Dave Summers (username "Heading Out"), a professor of mining engineering at Missouri University of Science and Technology (then known as University of Missouri-Rolla). The site first rose to prominence following its coverage of the impact of Hurricanes Katrina and Rita on oil and gas production. The staff grew by dozens and became well known for rigorous, quantitative analysis of energy production and consumption. A notable example is former editor Stuart Staniford's analysis of the depletion of Saudi Arabia's Ghawar oil field (Depletion Levels in Ghawar).

The site started out on the Blogger platform, moved to Scoop in August 2005, and to Drupal in December 2006.

In 2013, The Oil Drum announced that it would stop publishing new content and would turn into an archive resource. Reasons cited for this change include server costs and a dwindling number of contributors of high-quality content.

Other sources claimed that the site was archived to prevent further embarrassment to contributors as global oil production continued to increase.
