= The Elms (Bedhampton) =

Historic house in Old Bedhampton, Hampshire, England

Coordinates: 50.8526°N 1.0060°W

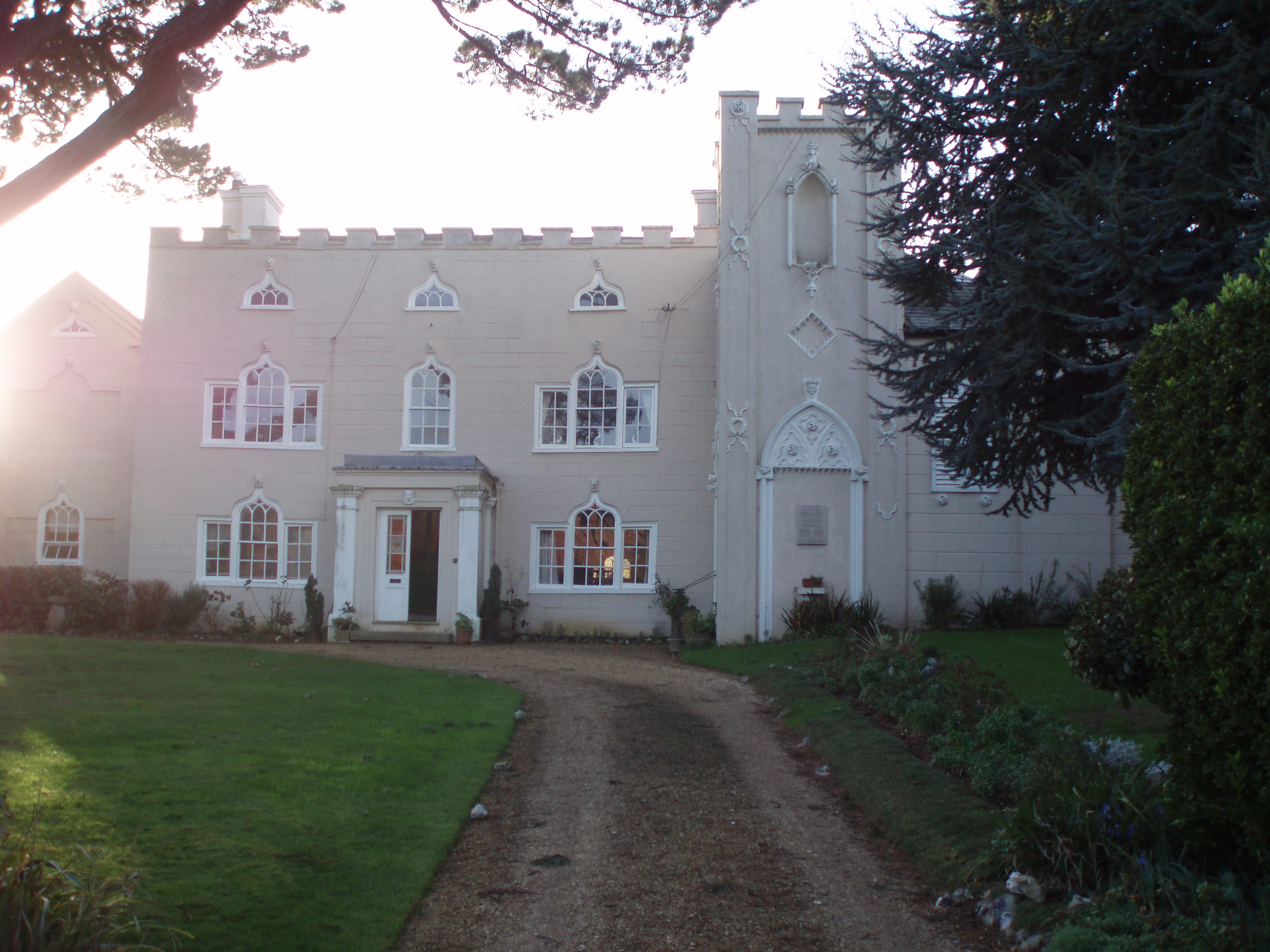

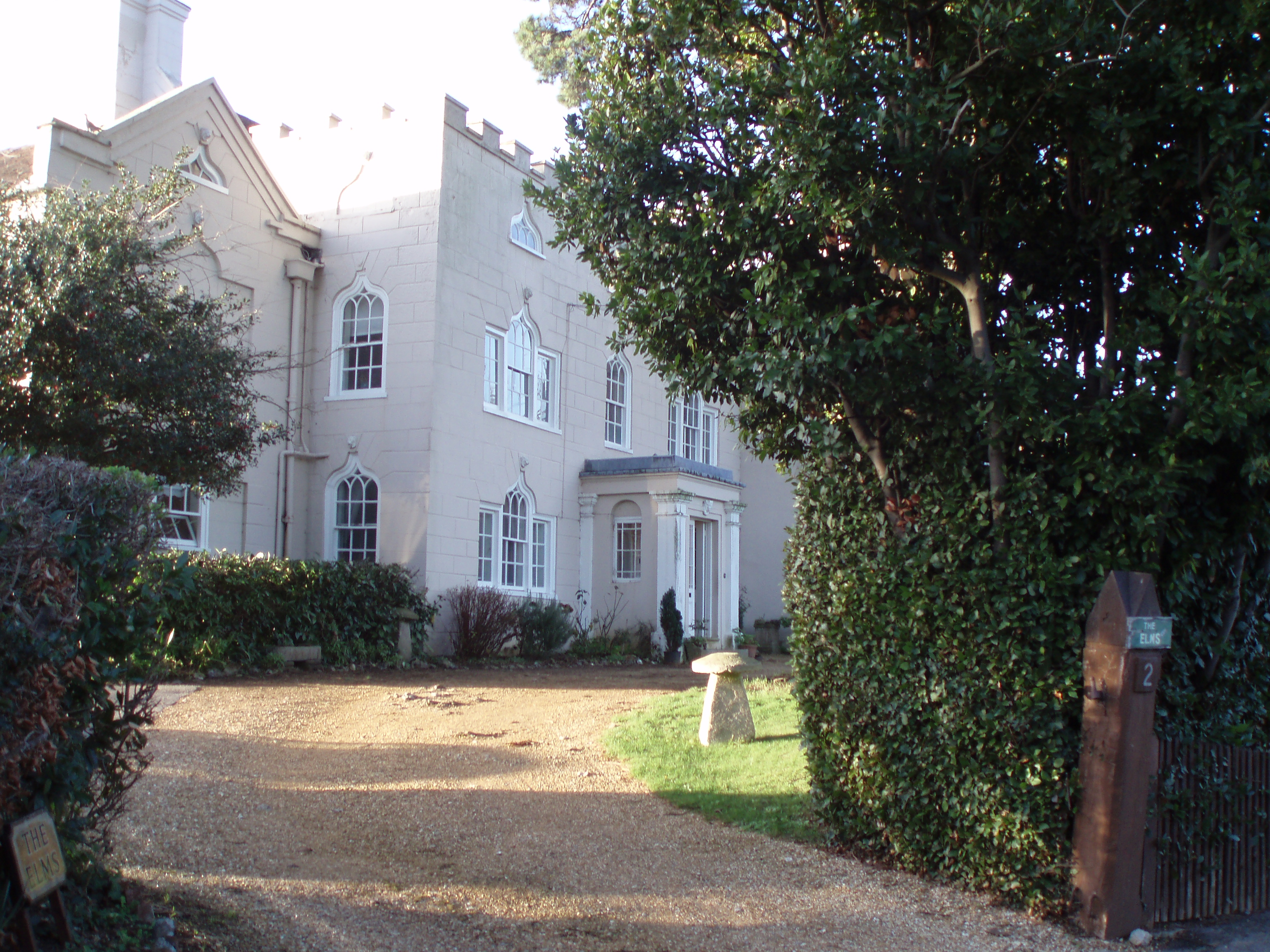

The Elms is an historic house in Old Bedhampton, near Havant, Hampshire in England. It is a Grade II* listed building The house was built in the 17th century and improved in the Gothic Revival style during the 18th.

Midway through the 19th century the owner, Sir Theophilus Lee, invited his second cousin Arthur Wellesley, the first Duke of Wellington, to dine there, commissioning a room in his honour. Lee's son, Authur, was MP for Havant at the end of the 19th century.

Today it forms part of the Manor Trust, a housing charity providing sheltered accommodation for elderly local residents.
