= Elmsdale =

Elmsdale may refer to:

- Elmsdale, Nova Scotia, Canada
- Elmsdale, Prince Edward Island, Canada

== See also ==
- Elmdale (disambiguation)
