= The Elms, North Wingfield =

The Elms (North Wingfield, Derbyshire)
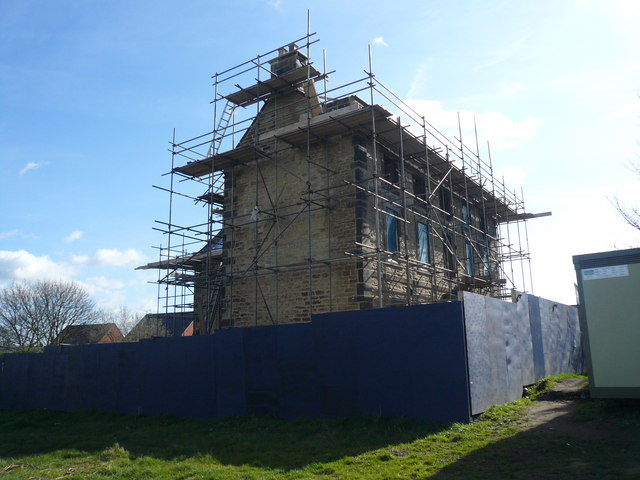
- The Elms (North Wingfield, Derbyshire)

- Location within Derbyshire
- 52°54′14.52″N 1°26′44.51″W
- Location: North Wingfield, Derbyshire, England

History
- Built: 1720

Listed Building – Grade II
- Official name: The Elms
- Designated: 31 January 1967
- Reference no.: 1108906

The Elms is a Grade II listed house on Bright Street, North Wingfield, North East Derbyshire, England. It was built by the Clay family in 1720.
