= John Elms =

English cricketer

John Emmanuel Elms (24 December 1874 – 1 November 1951) was an English first-class cricketer, who played one match for Yorkshire County Cricket Club in 1905.

Born in Pitsmoor, Sheffield, Yorkshire, England, Elms was a right-handed batsman, who began his career with a duck, but scored 20 in the second innings against Derbyshire at the County Ground, Derby. He caught Levi Wright for 43 off his own slow medium bowling in Derbyshire's second innings, at a total cost of 28 runs. This was the only wicket Yorkshire took, and Derbyshire ran out winners by nine wickets.

Elms also played for the Yorkshire Second XI from 1899 to 1906, H. Hayley's XI in 1906 and Sheffield and District in 1911.

Elms died in November 1951, in Fir Vale, Sheffield.
