= The Elms School, Colwall =

The Elms School

Location
- Walwyn Road, Colwall; Malvern, Worcestershire, WR13 6EF; England; 52.074°N 2.365°W

Information
- Type: Independent preparatory school
- Motto: God Grant Grace
- Religious affiliation: Christian
- Established: 1614; 412 years ago
- Founder: Humphrey Walwyn
- Ofsted: Reports
- Chairman of governors: James Rose
- Headmaster (2023): Ed Lyddon
- Staff: 55 (2022)
- Gender: Coeducational
- Age: 3 to 13
- Enrolment: 166 (2022)
- Colour: Maroon Black
- Website: http://elmsschool.co.uk/

The Elms School is a co-educational private boarding prep school located in Colwall, Herefordshire, England. Including the early years and pre-prep departments, it educates children from 3 to 13 years old (with boarding and flexiboarding available from Year 3 upwards).

It is a non-selective mainstream school, totally independent of any senior school, and therefore sends children on to a wide range of top senior schools.

== History ==
The Elms was founded in 1614 by Humphrey Walwyn of the Worshipful Company of Grocers, and is the oldest prep school still on its original site. The original school house was based on a farmhouse, built in the 1550s, on the edge of the village of Colwall in the lee of the Malvern Hills.

According to The Rise of the English Prep School, the official inception date of The Elms as a prep school dates back to 1867.

In 2014 The Elms School celebrated its 400-year anniversary, and named a new dormitory after the late former Prime Minister Margaret Thatcher. It maintains close links with the Grocers' Company, and receives financial assistance from the company's charitable arm.

== Facilities ==
The school has 40 acres of land, including a farm and a large outdoor arena for riding. As of 2013, The Elms was one of 98 schools in the UK with its own farm. The Elms has herds of Hereford cattle and Gloucester Old Spot pigs, and Shropshire Sheep, which pupils help to tend, and show at county agricultural shows. Meat from the farm is served in the school dining hall and sold to parents. Each class is responsible for tending a garden, and fruits and vegetables they grow are also used in the school kitchens.

The school also has a sports hall, theatre, swimming pool, astroturf, and science laboratories, as well as sports fields.

== Curriculum ==
Pupils study a standard curriculum, with the addition of Greek (for some pupils), Latin and Rural Studies. Pupils are largely taught by a form teacher in the early years, but there is more specialist subject teaching as they move up the school.

== Sport ==
Pupils play association football, rugby football, cricket, hockey, netball, rounders, athletics, triathlon and heptathlon.

== Notable alumni ==
- Stephen Davies, ornithologist
- Sir Peter Gadsden (1929–2006), 652nd Lord Mayor of London
- Quentin Letts (born 1963), journalist and theatre critic
- John Moore (1907–1967), author
