= Liz Henry =

American blogger, author, translator, technologist and activist (born 1969)

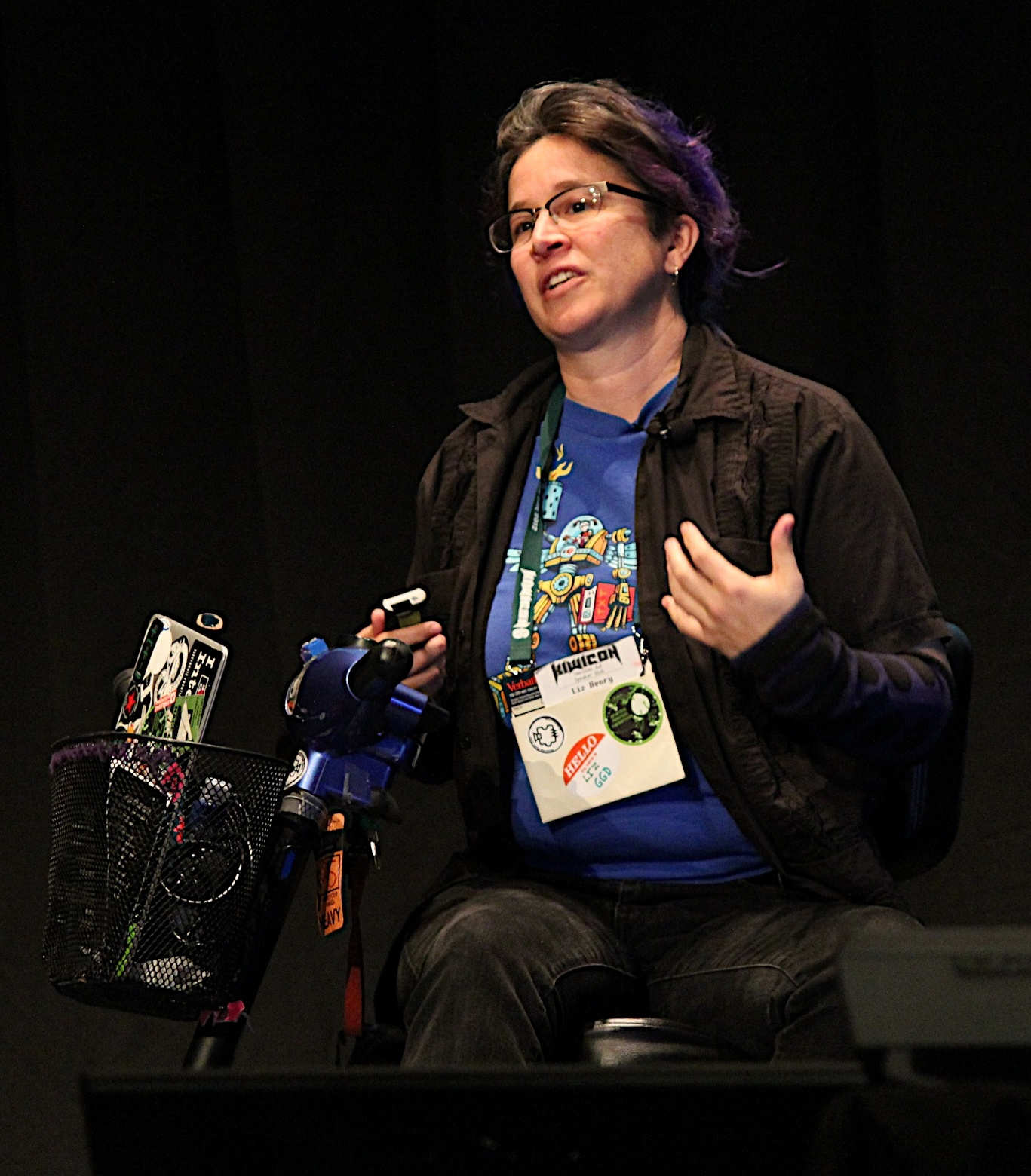
- Henry at Kiwicon in Wellington, New Zealand in 2012
- Born: 1969 (age 56–57)
- Occupations: Blogger, author, translator, technologist, activist

Liz Henry (born 1969) is an American blogger, author, translator, technologist, and activist. They are a co-founder of the first women's hackerspace in San Francisco, Double Union, where they are still active. They are also an advocate for disability technology and hacking existing technology for use by disabled people.

== Career ==
Henry is a senior release manager at Twitch. Previously, they were the Firefox release manager and bugmaster for Mozilla. They have also served on the advisory board of the GimpGirl Community and The Ada Initiative. In 2005, in the aftermath of Hurricane Katrina, Henry flew to Houston to help the evacuees. They worked with Technology For All to help people use technology to reconnect and rebuild.

In 2007, Henry co-organized BarCampBlock in Palo Alto, California.

In 2011, Henry played a key role in the unveiling of A Gay Girl In Damascus. They questioned whether the purported writer of the blog, Amina Arraf, actually existed.

In 2012, Aqueduct Press published a book of their poems, Unruly Islands. Henry also edited The WisCon Chronicles: Vol. 3: The Carnival of Feminist SF ISBN 978-1-933500-30-0, the third of a series of anthologies of articles about, or inspired by, the feminist science fiction convention WisCon, held every year in Madison, Wisconsin.

In 2017, Cardboard House Press published their translation of Chilean poet and writer Carmen Berenguer's book My Lai.

In 2024, they founded Grassroots Open Assistive Tech.

== Personal life ==
Henry and Danny O'Brien married in October 2018.
