= Elms (Mechanic Falls, Maine) =

- U.S. National Register of Historic Places
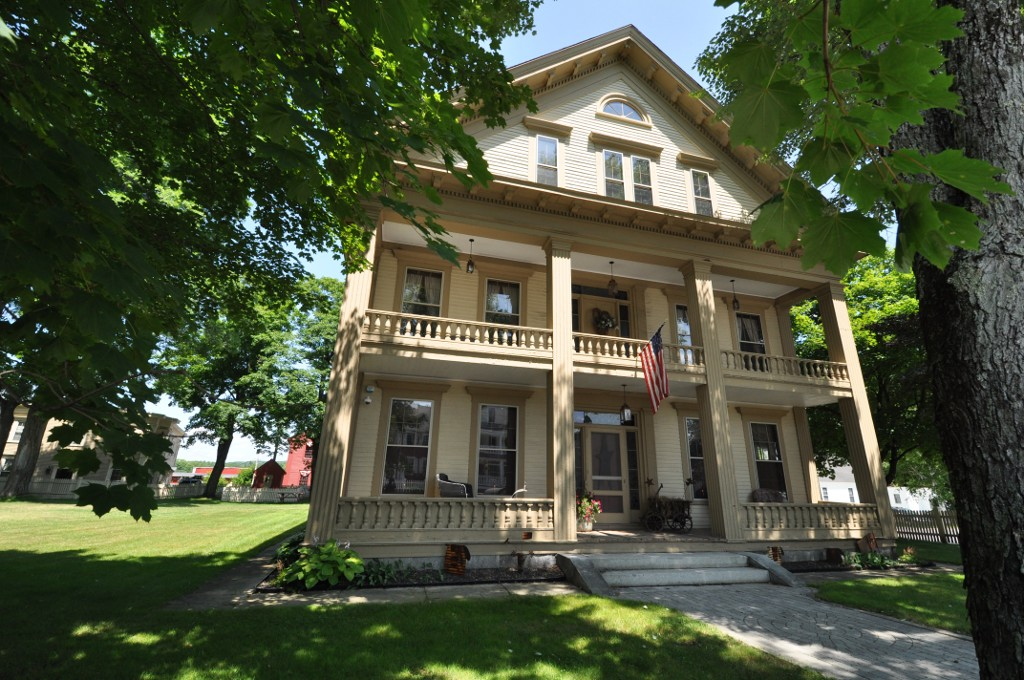

- Location within Maine Location within the United States
- Location: Mechanic Falls, Maine
- Coordinates: 44°6′38″N 70°23′25″W
- Built: 1859
- Architectural style: Classical Revival
- NRHP reference No.: 85000610
- Added to NRHP: March 21, 1985

The Elms (once the Eagle Hotel) is a historic building at the junction of Lewiston and Elm Streets in Mechanic Falls, Maine. Built as a hotel in 1859 and used for a variety of purposes since then, the substantial building is a fine late expression of Greek Revival architecture, and a reminder of the town's heyday as an industrial center. It was listed on the National Register of Historic Places in 1985.

== Description ==
The Elms is a large rectangular wood frame structure, situated on 0.5 acres (0.20 ha) of land at the junction of Lewiston and Elm Streets (Maine State Route 11 along both roads, and Maine State Route 121 on Lewiston Street) in Mechanic Falls, Maine, a short way east from the Little Androscoggin River. It is 2-1/2 stories high, with a gable roof. The main facade, facing Elm Street to the southwest, is five bays wide, with a temple-front appearance. The porch is a full two stories in height, with four fluted square posts topped by capitals, and a fully pedimented gable above. The porch balustrade, composed of urn-like balusters, extends fully across the second floor, and is open between the center columns on the first floor.

The main facade is five bays wide, with long sash windows on both main levels, and a centered entry which is flanked by sidelight windows and pilasters, and topped by a transom window and entablature. In the gable tympanum there are two sash windows with a single half-round window centered near the apex of the gable. The side elevations are six bays long, and roof has four equally spaced gable dormers on each side. A single-story porch lines the rear elevation. The building's interior has retained some of its original period woodwork.

The Elms was built in 1859 by the A. C. Denison Company, and operated as the Eagle Hotel, with a reported capacity of forty rooms. A. C. Denison took over the property as his private residence in 1870. By 1887 it had again been opened as a hotel, this time as the "Hotel Elms". The building has had a long association with the paper mill (which stands just to the north). The building currently houses an antiques and crafts shop.

== See also ==
- National Register of Historic Places listings in Androscoggin County, Maine
