= Keith Henson =

American electrical engineer and writer (born 1942)

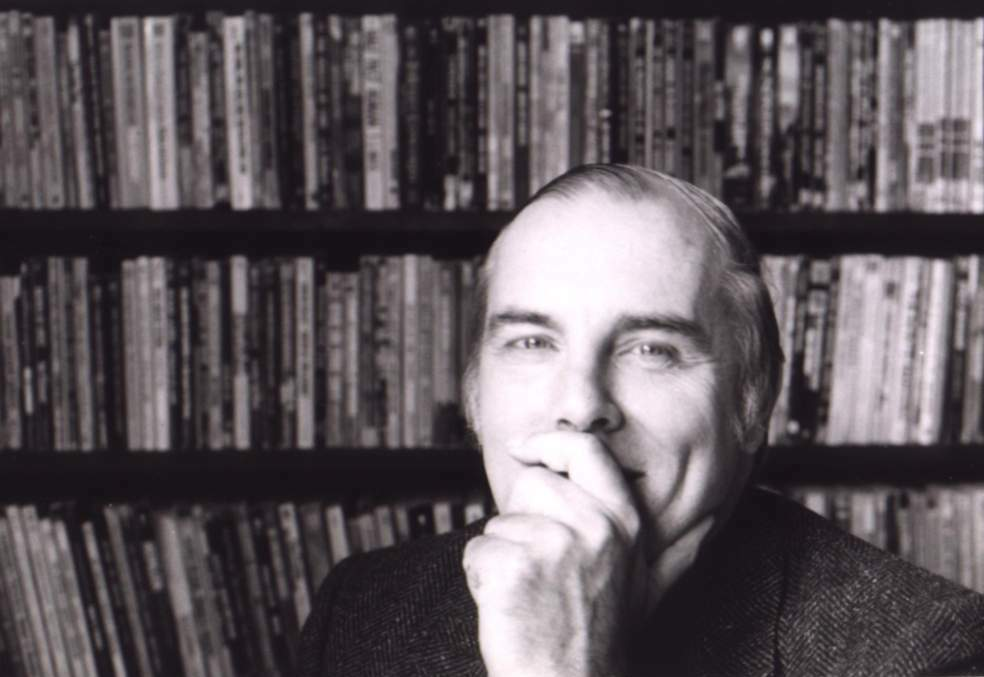
- Henson
- Born: 1942 (age 83–84); United States
- Education: University of Arizona, electrical engineering
- Known for: L5 Society, founding member National Space Society, lifetime member
- Spouse(s): Carolyn Meinel (m. 1967; div. 1981) Arel Lucas
- Children: Valerie Aurora
- Scientific career
- Fields: electrical engineer, life extension, cryonics, memetics, Evolutionary psychology

Howard Keith Henson (born 1942) is an American electrical engineer and writer. Henson writes on subjects including space engineering, space law (Moon Treaty), memetics, cryonics, evolutionary psychology, and the physical limitations of Transhumanism. In 1975, Henson founded the L5 Society with his then-wife Carolyn Meinel to promote space colonization. In 1987 the L5 Society merged with the National Space Institute to form the National Space Society.

== Early influences ==
Henson was raised in a military family, and he attended seven schools before seventh grade. His father, Lt. Col. Howard W. Henson (1909–2001), was a decorated (Bronze Star and Legion of Merit) US Army officer who spent much of his career in Army Intelligence. The science-fiction author Robert A. Heinlein heavily influenced his early life. Henson graduated from Prescott High School shortly after his father retired, before attending the University of Arizona and receiving a degree in electrical engineering.

== University ==
During most of his time at university, Henson worked at a geophysics company and mostly ran induced polarization surveys in the western US and Peru. He also programmed geophysical type cases and wrote data reduction programs for the company.

=== Druid prank ===
Henson was known at the University of Arizona as one of the founders of the Druid Student Center, where a campus humor newspaper, The Frumious Bandersnatch was published in the late 1960s. He cited an incident while he was a student as a good example of memetic replication. When someone asked him to fill in a form which required him to disclose his religious affiliations, he wrote Druid. His prank was soon noticed by other students and before long almost 20% of the student body had registered themselves as Reform Druids, Orthodox Druids, Members of the Church of the nth Druid, Zen Druids, Latter-Day Druids and so on. The university was forced to remove the religious affiliation question.

== Analog engineering ==
After graduation, Henson went to work for Burr-Brown Research, later merged into Texas Instruments, in Tucson, Arizona. He worked on extremely low distortion quadrature oscillators and nonlinear function modules (multipliers, vector adders and root-mean-square). His first patent was a design for a 4-quadrant log-antilog multiplier. He claims to have been fired from an unnamed company in 1972 for refusing to certify an electronic module for a nuclear power plant that failed to meet a required MTBF specification. Henson set up his own company, Analog Precision Inc., to produce specialized computer interface equipment and related industrial control devices.

Henson married his first wife, Carolyn Meinel, in 1967 and divorced in 1981.

== L5 Society ==
In 1974, Henson's occasional rock climbing partner, physicist Dr. Dan Jones, introduced him to the space colonization work of Dr. Gerard K. O'Neill from Princeton University. To promote these ideas, Henson and Meinel founded the L5 Society in 1975.

Henson co-wrote papers for three Space Manufacturing conferences at Princeton. The 1977 and 1979 papers were co-authored with Eric Drexler. Patents were issued on both subjects—vapor phase fabrication and space radiators.

In 1980, Henson testified before the United States Congress when the L5 Society successfully opposed the Moon Treaty. The society was represented by Leigh Ratiner. The experience eventually became an article, Star Laws, jointly written by Henson and Arel Lucas and published in Reason Magazine. Timothy Leary was influenced by Henson's work-and credited him in publications when he referred to Space Migration and Life Extension.

== Memetics ==
Henson's wife, Arel Lucas, was credited by Douglas Hofstadter in Metamagical Themas for suggesting that the study of memes be called memetics. Henson wrote two articles on memes in 1987, one published in Analog and the other, Memes, Meta Memes and Politics, circulated on the internet before being printed.

Richard Dawkins, who created the concept of memes, approvingly cites Henson's coining of the neologism memeoids to refer to "victims who have been taken over by a meme to the extent that their own survival becomes inconsequential" in the second edition of his book The Selfish Gene.

== Cryonics ==
In 1985, Henson, his wife, and their two-year-old daughter signed up with Alcor for cryonic suspension after being convinced by Eric Drexler that nanotechnology provided a method to make it work. Henson's daughter is the youngest member to sign up to Alcor. Following the Dora Kent problems, Henson became increasingly active with Alcor. After Alcor froze their chief surgeon, he learned enough surgery to put several cryonics patients on cardiac bypass. He also wrote a column for Alcor's magazine, Cryonics, for a few years. Henson persuaded Timothy Leary to become an Alcor member, though Leary eventually dropped his membership.

In that same year, Henson moved to Silicon Valley to consult for a number of firms and debugged garbage collection software for the last stage of Project Xanadu.

== Scientology ==
Keith Henson was working for the company that bought the Xanadu license when Scientology lawyer Helena Kobrin tried to destroy the news group alt.religion.scientology. and later e-mailed legal warnings to participants who had quoted as few as six lines of Scientology texts.

Henson is one of the focal points of the ongoing struggle between the Church of Scientology and its critics, often referred to as Scientology versus the Internet. Henson entered the Scientology conflict when it was at its most heated in the mid-1990s. In 1996, many of Scientology's secret writings were released onto the Internet, and the Church of Scientology embarked on a massive worldwide campaign to keep them from being spread to the general public. Henson examined these writings, titled New Era Dianetics (NOTS), and from his examination of these secret documents, said that Scientology was committing medical fraud. The NOTS documents, he said, contained detailed instructions for the treatment of physical ailments and illnesses through the use of Scientology practices. The Supreme Court decision in 1971 had declared that Scientology's writings were meant for "purely spiritual" purposes, and all Scientology books published since then have included disclaimers stating that Scientology's E-meter device "does nothing" and does not cure any physical ailments. The NOTS procedures, Henson claimed, were a violation of this decision. To prove his claim, Henson posted two pages from the NOTS documents onto the Usenet newsgroup alt.religion.scientology.

The Church of Scientology immediately initiated legal action, but Henson did not retract his claims. He was served with a lawsuit by the Religious Technology Center (RTC), a Scientology organization which holds the trademarks related to Scientology and Dianetics. Henson defended himself. After a lengthy court battle involving massive amounts of paperwork, Henson was found guilty of copyright infringement. He was ordered to pay $75,000 in fines. Henson declared bankruptcy in response to the judgment. Henson began protesting Scientology regularly, standing outside Scientology's Gold Base with a picket sign. The organization sought to obtain a restraining order, which was not granted.

Henson was, however, charged with three misdemeanors under California Law: making criminal threats (California Penal Code section 422), attempting to make criminal threats (California Penal Code section 422, charged pursuant to Penal Code 664, the "general attempt" statute), and threatening to interfere with freedom to enjoy a constitutional privilege. Sheriff's Detective Tony Greer, Riverside County lead investigator, said: "In reviewing all of the Internet postings I did not see any direct threat of violence towards the church or any personnel of the church."

The jury verdict of the trial resulted in Henson being convicted on one of the three charges: "interfering with a religion." This misdemeanor charge carried a prison term of six months. On the other two charges, the jury did not agree.

Henson stated his belief that his life would be placed in jeopardy if he went to prison. Rather than serve his sentence, Henson chose to enter Canada and apply for political asylum. Henson lived quietly in Brantford, Ontario for three years while he awaited the decision. His request was ultimately denied, and in 2005 he was ordered to present himself for deportation and transfer to US authorities. Instead, Henson fled to the United States and later presented himself to the Canadian consulate in Detroit. Then he settled in Prescott, Arizona, where he remained for two years until his arrest in 2007 by Arizona authorities.

The Electronic Frontier Foundation, as well as Henson's supporters on the USENET newsgroup alt.religion.scientology, say that his trial was biased, unfair and a mockery of justice. Henson was prohibited by the trial judge, for example, from arguing that copying documents for the purpose of criticism is fair use. Henson was held at the Yavapai Detention Center in Prescott, Arizona, awaiting extradition to Riverside County, California. At the "initial appearance" hearing on February 5, 2007, Henson stated through counsel that he was fighting extradition and requested release.

Judge Lindberg set a court date for March 5, 2007, in the Prescott Justice Court and set release at $7,500 cash or bond, with standard conditions. Henson's release on bond was secured. In spite of these distractions, Henson finished a space elevator presentation for a European Space Agency conference. The paper was presented by proxy on February 28, 2007.

The extradition hearing for Henson was postponed until May 8, 2007, at the request of Henson's attorney and the County attorney. At his release from jail, Henson was handed paper work from Riverside County, including a warrant from September 15, 2000. At the May 8, 2007 hearing, Henson was presented with an arrest warrant and returned to jail. In 2007, Henson was jailed in Riverside, California for "using threats of force to interfere with another's exercise of civil rights". He was released in early September 2007.

== Energy systems ==
From 2007 on, Henson worked independently and with others on the problems of global energy supply and affordable cost, particularly on power satellites for space-based solar power. There he was particularly concerned with launch cost, system mass, waste heat, heat radiators, and economics.

The power satellite work was reported in a series of articles starting with two posted on The Oil Drum and three presented at IEEE SusTech conferences for Sustainable Technology. Henson also was involved in producing videos about thermal power satellites and beamed energy propulsion the latter of which won an award in an international competition. (See Online Journal of Space Communication, Issue No. 18 under Works, below.)

A shorter version was shown at the White House in the last days of the Obama administration by Lt. Col. Peter Garretson and Dr. Paul Jaffe as part of the D3 government-wide contest.

Additionally, he worked over a year for Ed Kelly on StratoSolar when it seemed possible that high altitude lighter-than-air StratoSolar could beat the projected cost of power satellites.

Henson visited Reaction Engines in the UK twice: in 2012 on the way back from a power satellite presentation in Germany ("Economic feedback for low-cost solar energy from space") and in 2016 when he gave a two-hour presentation to the engineering department of Reaction Engines. The latter, plus other, later discussions set the rate of expansion for producing Skylon rocket planes used in the power satellite business cases.

In early 2015, Henson created the Google group Power Satellite Economics where various concerned citizens and experts from various fields can discuss the complexities and benefits of power satellites and related work.

== Works ==
- Henson, H.K., and K.E. Drexler: Vapor-phase Fabrication of Massive Structures in Space, Space Manufacturing AIAA 1977
- Henson, H.K., and K.E. Drexler: Gas Entrained Solids: A Heat Transfer Fluid for Use in Space Space Manufacturing AIAA 1979
- H. Keith Henson and Arel Lucas: STAR LAWS Reason Magazine, Aug. 1982
- Henson, H.K.: Memes, L5 and the religion of the space colonies. L5 News, September 1985, pp. 5–8.
- Henson, H.K.: More on Memes L5 News, June 1986
- Henson, H.Keith: MEMETICS AND THE MODULAR-MIND Analog August 1987
- Henson, Keith: "Memetics: The Science of Information Viruses". Whole Earth Review no. 57, 1987
- Henson, H. Keith: 1987
- Henson, H. Keith: Memes Meta-Memes and Politics, 1988 Alt.
- H. Keith Henson and Arel Lucas: Darwin's difficulty (From Extropy) 1989
- H. Keith Henson and Arel Lucas: Memes, Evolution, and Creationism, 1989,
- H. Keith Henson: "Green Rage". Archived from the original on June 8, 2008.
- H. Keith Henson: and Arel Lucas: "A Theoretical Understanding". Archived from the original on November 3, 2004., 1993
- Keith Henson: "Wogs at Cause—Car chases and other modern courtroom phenomena" Archived September 29, 2007, at the Wayback Machine (adapted from the version published in Biased Journalism). Also
- H. Keith Henson: South of the Border at the Road Kill Cafe (Part 1) Archived September 29, 2007, at the Wayback Machine
- Henson, H. Keith: Sex, Drugs, and Cults. An evolutionary psychology perspective on why and how cult memes get a drug-like hold on people, and what might be done to mitigate the effects, The Human Nature Review 2002 Volume 2: 343–355
- H. Keith Henson: Evolutionary Psychology Memes and the Origin of War , Mankind Quarterly, 2006. Also
- H. Keith Henson: A 2000 tonne per day Space Elevator at the Wayback Machine (archived May 15, 2007) ESA Conference presentation Feb 2007
- H. Keith Henson: The Clinic Seed—Africa.
- Keith Henson: Tunnel of Love.
- H. Keith Henson: Beamed Energy and the Economics of Space Based Solar Power, Beamed Energy Propulsion: 6th International Symposium, American Inst. of Physics, 2010 ISBN 978-0-7354-0774-9
- Keith Henson (June 3, 2011). "Space Solar Power – Recent Conceptual Progress". The Oil Drum.
- Keith Henson (September 2, 2011). "An Idea for Inexpensive Electricity: Concentrated Solar Power 12 Miles above the Earth". The Oil Drum.
- Keith Henson (April 12, 2012). "Transhumanism and the Human Expansion into Space: a Conflict with Physics". h+ Media. Archived from the original on November 30, 2012.
- Keith Henson. "Rays of Hope: Propulsion lasers to get parts up, Microwaves to get energy down and the effect of large-scale deployment of power satellites on CO2".
- Keith Henson; Steve Nixon. "THE COLONIZATION OF (NEAR) SPACE". Archived from the original on April 7, 2014. Also
- Keith Henson (July 7, 2018). "Dollar a Gallon Gasoline".
- Keith Henson (July 7, 2018). "Power Satellite Progress". Archived from the original on September 13, 2014. Comment on David MacKay's blog
- Henson, K (2014). "Solving economics, energy, carbon and climate in a single project". 2014 IEEE Conference on Technologies for Sustainability (Sus Tech). pp. 203–208. doi:10.1109/SusTech.2014.7046244. ISBN 978-1-4799-5238-0. S2CID 44530126. 2014 IEEE Conference on Technologies for Sustainability (SusTech), (pp. 203–208). Portland: IEEE.
- Keith Henson; Steve Nixon; Kris Holland; Anna Nesterova. "Thermal Power Satellites: A private collaboration between space scientists and media professionals". Online Journal of Space Communication, Issue No. 18.
- Keith Henson. "Thermal Power Satellites". Online Journal of Space Communication, Issue No. 18.
- Keith Henson. "Mining Asteroids".
- Keith Henson. "UpLift: A story of Space Elevators and Power Satellites plus a bit on Mining Asteroids".
- Keith Henson (2016). "Solar power satellites, a solution to energy and carbon". 2016 IEEE Conference on Technologies for Sustainability (Sus Tech). pp. 207–212. doi:10.1109/SusTech.2016.7897168. ISBN 978-1-5090-4158-9. S2CID 43227646. 2016 IEEE Conference on Technologies for Sustainability (SusTech), Phoenix, AZ: IEEE
- Beamed Energy Bootstrapping Keith Henson, Anna Nestrova https://www.youtube.com/watch?v=VEkZkINrJaA
- Genetic Selection for War in Prehistoric Human Populations. H. Keith Henson, Arel Lucas (2025) Journal of Big History, VIII(2); 124–127. DOI | https://doi.org/10.22339/jbh.v8i2.8207
- Bad Days, Keith Henson a novel-length story about cults and nukes. https://htyp.org/Bad_Days
