= Carolyn Meinel =

American journalist

Carolyn P. Meinel (born 1946) is notable for being one of the targets in the hacking scene during the 1990s.

== Biography ==
In 1983, Meinel received an M.S. in industrial engineering from the University of Arizona. Her father is Aden Meinel and mother is Marjorie Meinel. Meinel married her first husband, Howard Keith Henson, in 1967 and divorced in 1981. Meinel has four daughters, one of whom is Valerie Aurora. In August 1975, Meinel co-founded (with her then-husband, Keith Henson) the L5 Society, since merged into the National Space Society, and was its president for several years.

In 1996, Meinel was among the targets of a high-profile email bomber known as "Unamailer" or "johnny xchaotic".

Some security experts, such as Brian Martin of Attrition, have criticized her writings, claiming that they are inaccurate and generally misrepresent hacking.

== Publications ==
=== Books ===
- Uberhacker!: How to Break into a Computer. Loompanics. 2000. ISBN 1-55950-207-X.
- The Happy Hacker 4th Edition. Lexington & Concord, distributed by American Eagle Publications. 2001. ISBN 0-929408-29-2.
- Uberhacker II: More Ways to Break into a Computer. Loompanics. 2003. ISBN 1-55950-239-8.

=== Articles ===
- "How the West Was Won... or, The L-5 Society Defeated the Moon Treaty," Spacefaring Gazette, Vol. 10, No. 3, June/July 1994, pp. 1, 8.
- "How Hackers Break in and How they Are Caught," Scientific American, Oct. 1998,
- "For Love of a Gun," the history, technologies of electromagnetic guns, IEEE Spectrum, July, 2007, pp. 40 46.
- (Many other articles)
