= Women in computing =

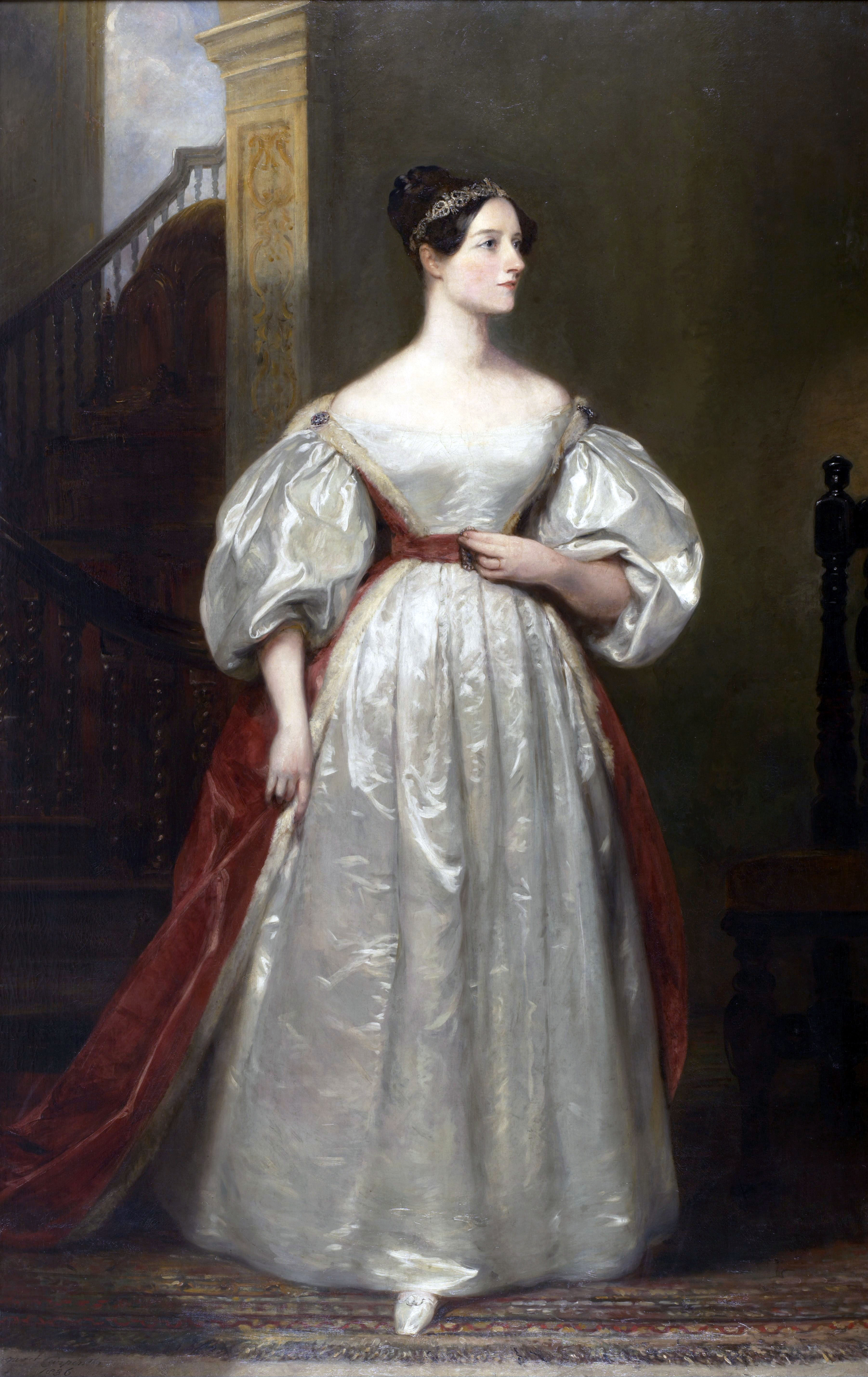
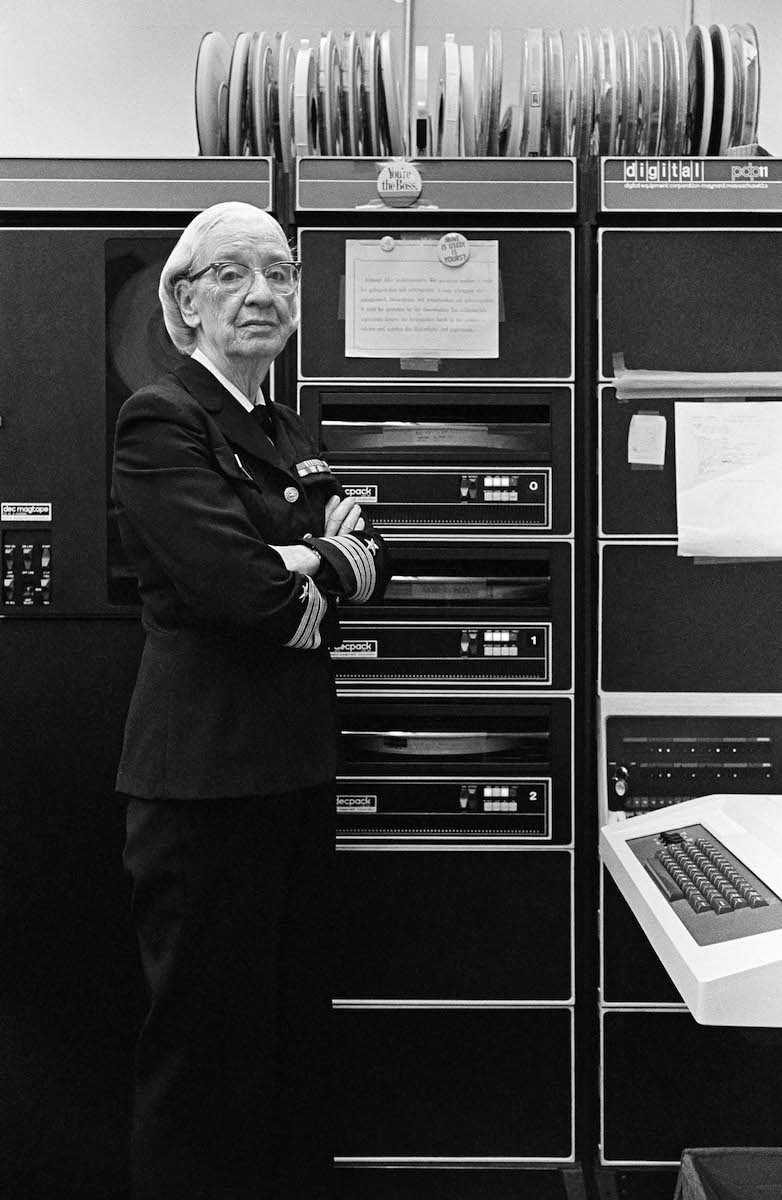
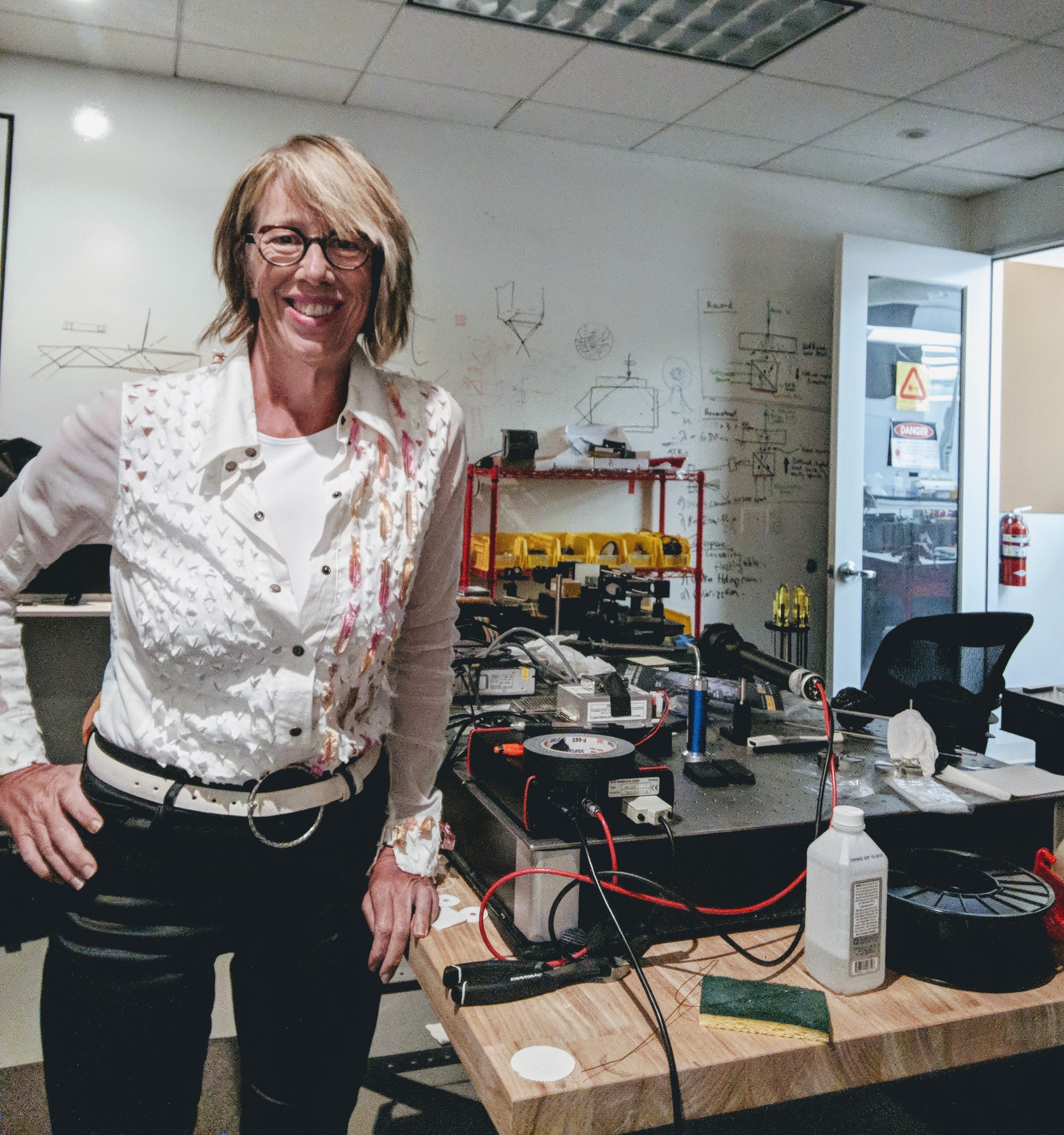
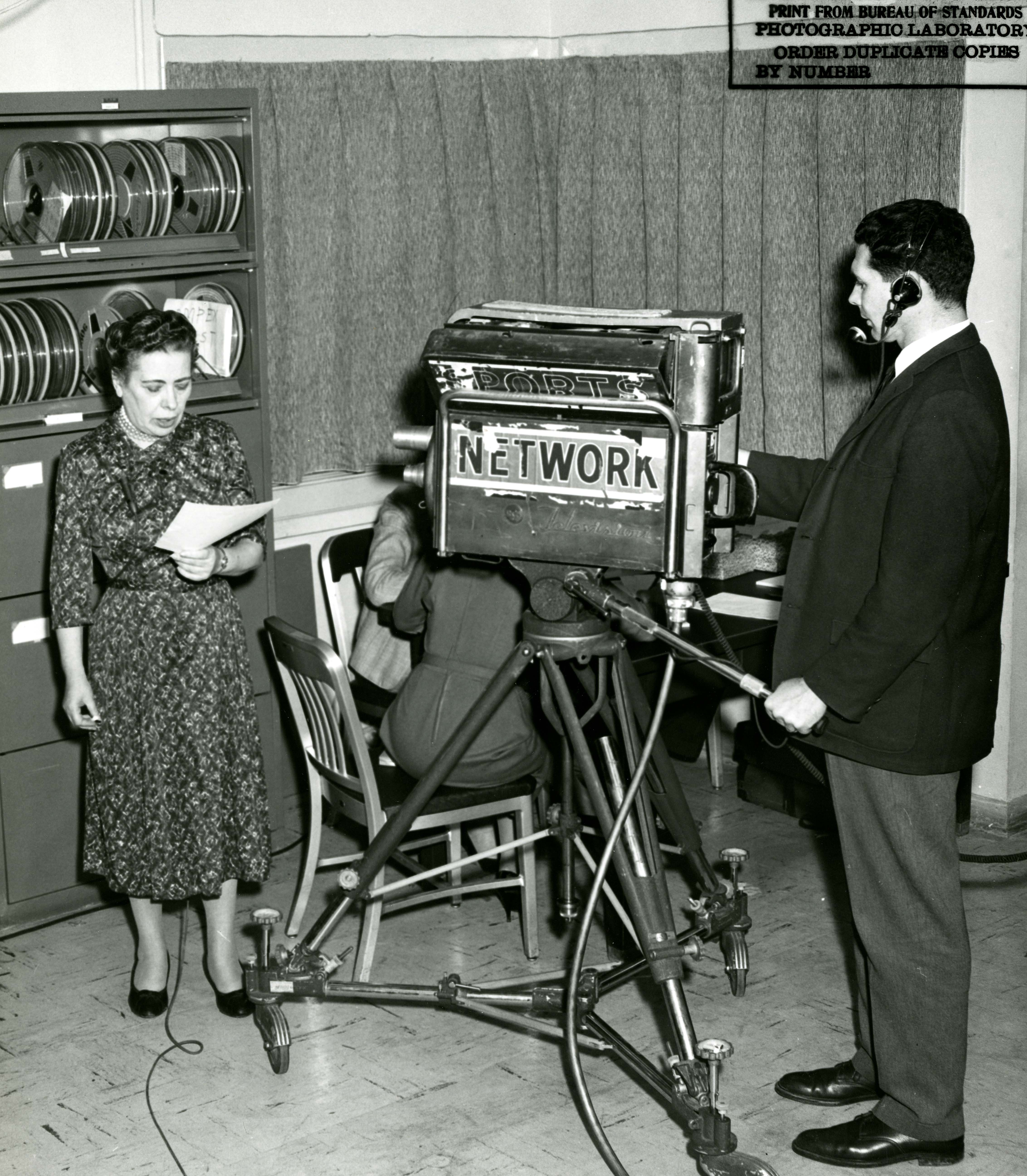
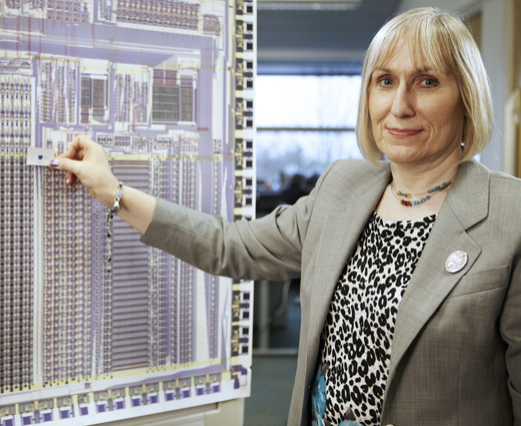
Women pioneers in computing. Clockwise from top left: Ada Lovelace, Grace Hopper, Ida Rhodes, Sophie Wilson, Aminata Sana Congo, Mary Lou Jepsen.

Women have been involved in computing since the 18th century. Before the advent of machines that could perform computations, people who "performed mathematical calculations were known as computers." Women developed scientific computations, including Nicole-Reine Lepaute's prediction of the return of Halley's Comet, and Maria Mitchell's computation of the motion of Venus. As technology and practices evolved, the role of women in computation and programming changed, and the recorded history of the field has subsequently downplayed their achievements.

The first algorithm intended to be executed by a mechanical computer was designed by pioneering Ada Lovelace, while Grace Hopper was the first person to design a compiler for a programming language. Throughout the 19th and early 20th century, and up to World War II, computing was predominantly done by women; significant examples include the Harvard Computers, women codebreakers at Bletchley Park and engineers at NASA.

Starting in the 1960s but accelerating in the late 20th century computing professions began to be more lucrative and high-status, leading to women becoming increasingly marginalized in the field. In the 21st century, women have held leadership roles in multiple tech companies, such as Meg Cushing Whitman, president and chief executive officer of Hewlett Packard Enterprise, and Marissa Mayer, president and CEO of Yahoo! and key spokesperson at Google.

== History ==
=== 19th century ===
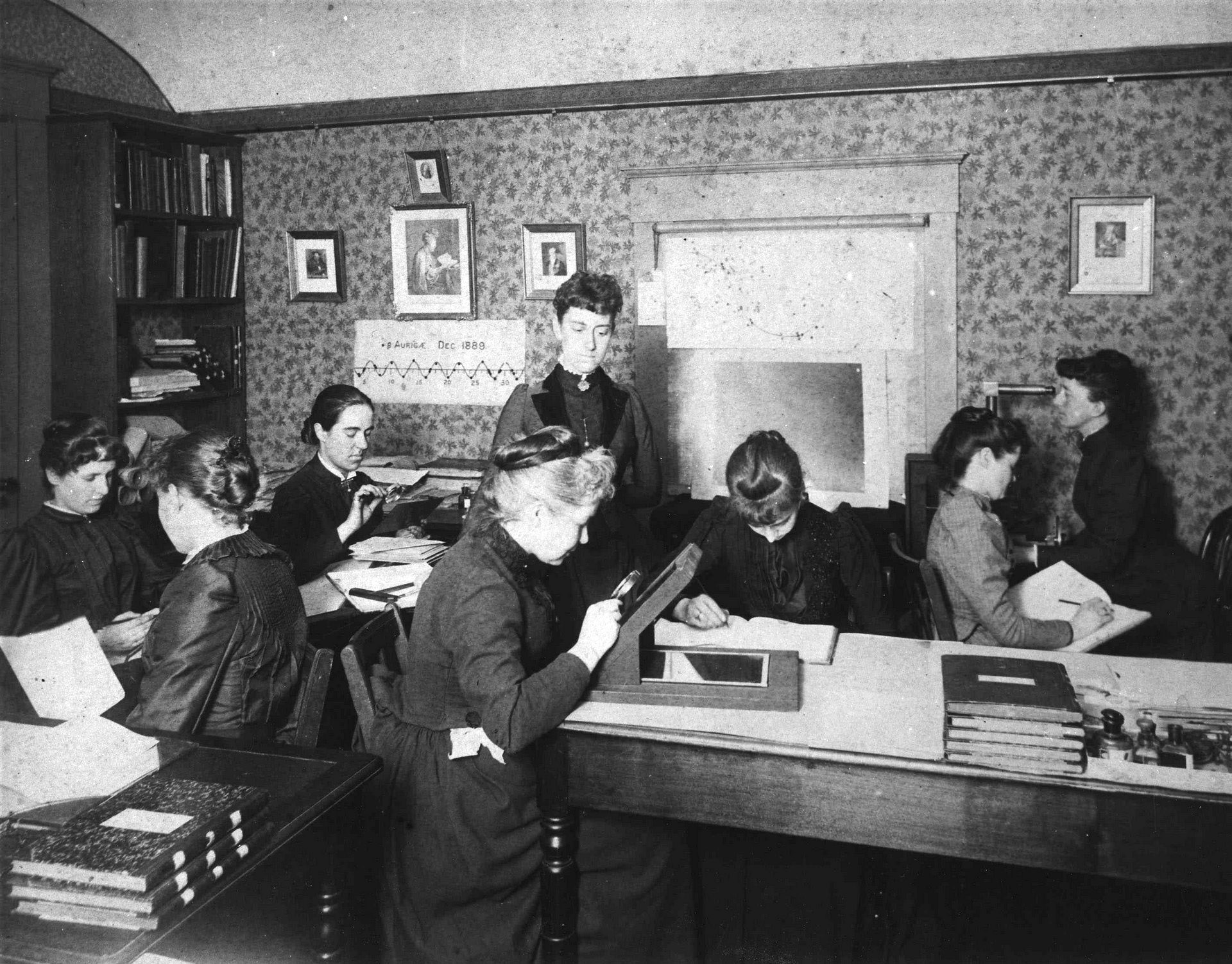
Astronomer Edward Charles Pickering's Harvard computers

Maria Mitchell was one of the first computers for the U.S. Nautical Almanac Office. Her primary job was to compute the motion of Venus and other planets, and to create navigation tables for naval use. Later, Mitchell became the first female astronomy professor at Vassar College.

Ada Lovelace was the first person to publish an algorithm intended to be executed by the first modern computer, the Analytical Engine created by Charles Babbage. As a result, she is often regarded as the first computer programmer. Lovelace was introduced to Babbage's difference engine when she was 17, and in 1840, she wrote to Babbage and asked if she could become involved with his first machine. By this time, Babbage had moved on to his idea for the Analytical Engine. A paper describing the Analytical Engine, Notions sur la machine analytique, published by L.F. Menabrea, came to the attention of Lovelace, who not only translated it into English, but corrected mistakes made by Menabrea. Babbage suggested that she expand the translation of the paper with her own ideas, which, signed only with her initials, AAL, "synthesized the vast scope of Babbage's vision." Lovelace imagined the kind of impact the Analytical Engine might have on society. She drew up explanations of how the engine could handle inputs, outputs, processing and data storage. She also created several proofs to show how the engine would handle calculations of Bernoulli Numbers on its own. The proofs are considered the first examples of a computer program. Lovelace downplayed her role in her work during her life, for example, in signing her contributions with AAL so as not be "accused of bragging."

After the Civil War in the United States, more women were hired as human computers. Many were war widows looking for ways to support themselves. Others were hired when the government opened positions to women because of a shortage of men to fill the roles.

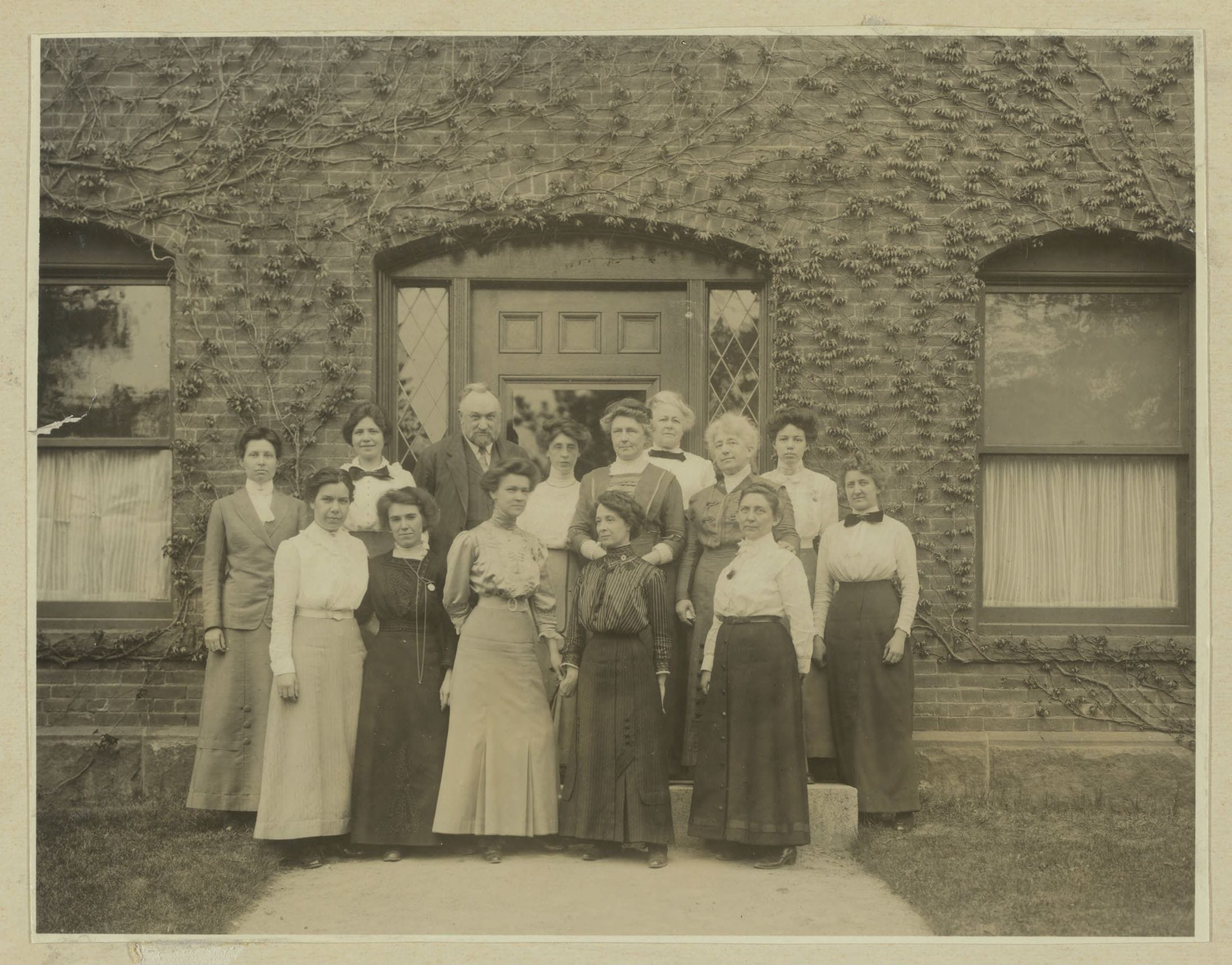
Photograph of the Harvard Computers (unflatteringly known as "Pickering's Harem")

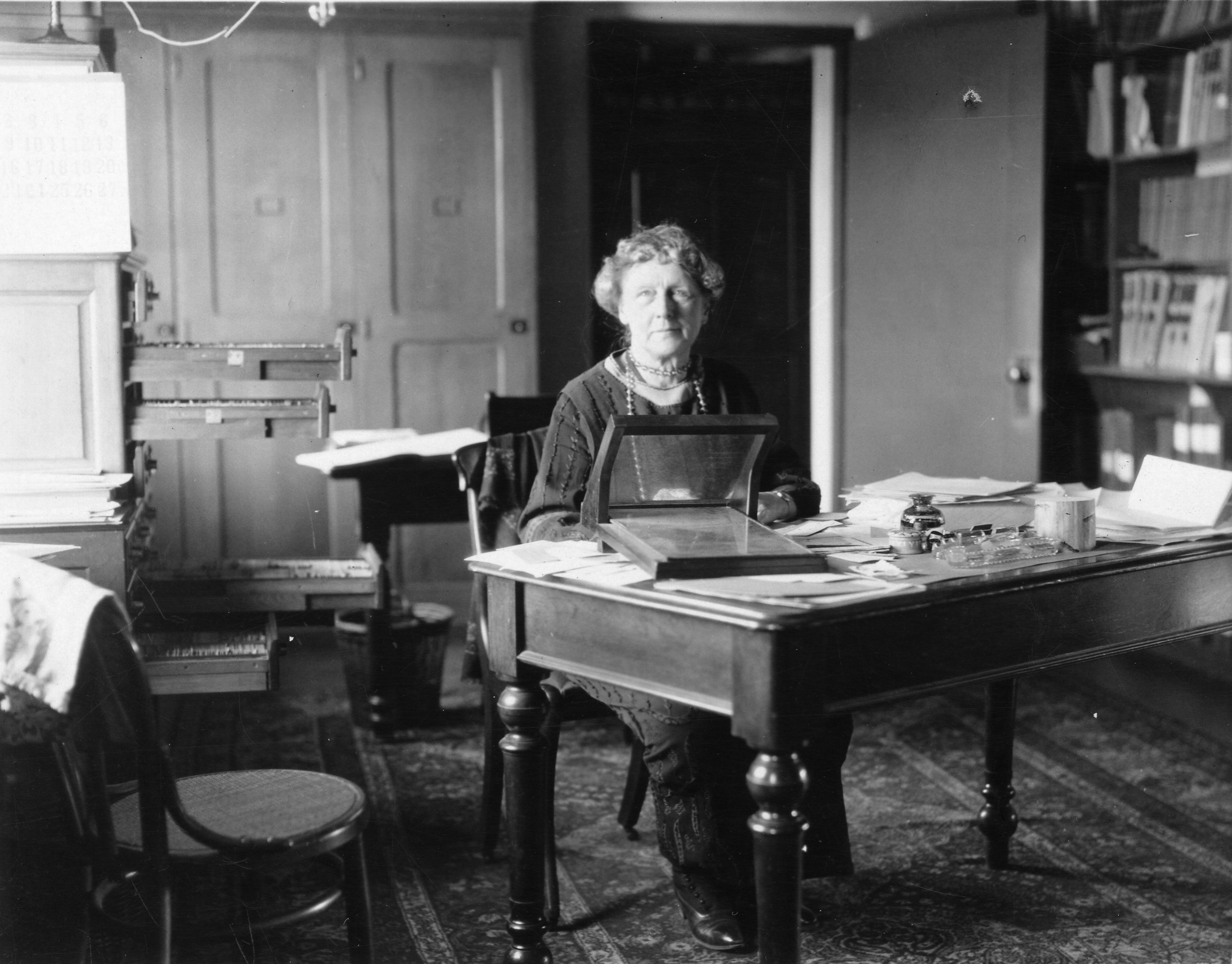
Annie Jump Cannon working at Harvard

Anna Winlock asked to become a computer for the Harvard Observatory in 1875 and was hired to work for 25 cents an hour. By 1880, Edward Charles Pickering had hired several women to work for him at Harvard because he knew that women could do the job as well as men and he could ask them to volunteer or work for less pay. The women, described as "Pickering's harem" and also as the Harvard Computers, performed clerical work that the male employees and scholars considered to be tedious at a fraction of the cost of hiring a man. The women working for Pickering cataloged around ten thousand stars, discovered the Horsehead Nebula and developed the system to describe stars. One of the "computers," Annie Jump Cannon, could classify stars at a rate of three stars per minute. The work for Pickering became so popular that women volunteered to work for free even when the computers were being paid. Even though they performed an important role, the Harvard Computers were paid less than factory workers.

By the 1890s, women computers were college graduates looking for jobs where they could use their training in a useful way. Florence Tebb Weldon, was part of this group and provided computations relating to biology and evidence for Darwin's theory of evolution, working with her husband, W.F. Raphael Weldon. Another human computer involved in biology was Alice Lee, who worked with Karl Pearson. Pearson also hired two sisters to work as part-time computers at his Biometrics Lab, Beatrice and Frances Cave-Browne-Cave.

=== 1910s ===
During World War I, Karl Pearson and his Biometrics Lab helped produce ballistics calculations for the British Ministry of Munitions. Beatrice Cave-Browne-Cave helped calculate trajectories for bomb shells. In 1916, Cave-Browne-Cave left Pearson's employ and started working full-time for the Ministry. In the United States, women computers were hired to calculate ballistics in 1918, working in a building on the Washington Mall. One of the women, Elizabeth Webb Wilson, worked as the chief computer. After the war, women who worked as ballistics computers for the U.S. government had trouble finding jobs in computing and Wilson eventually taught high school math.

=== 1920s ===
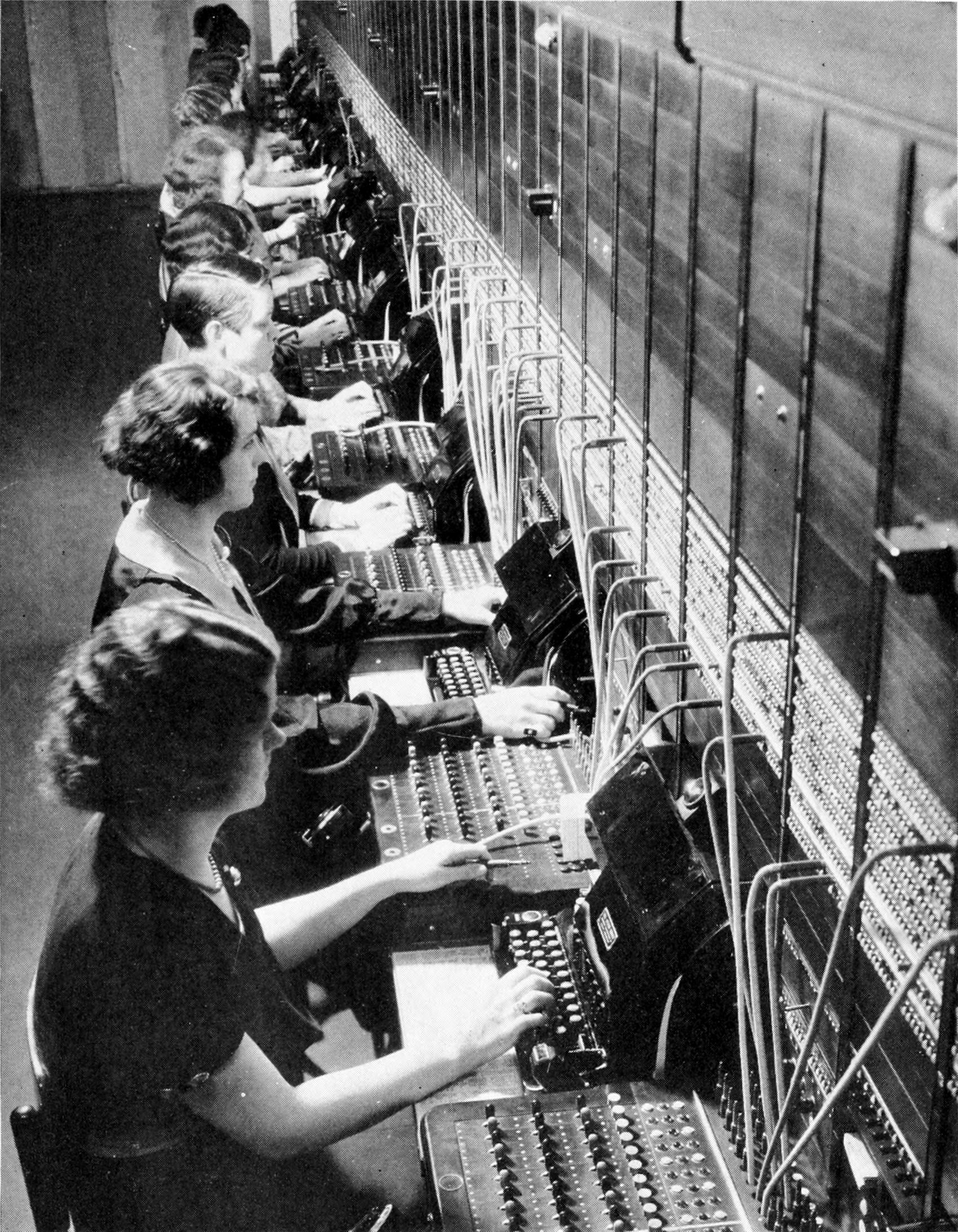
A group of operators working on an AT&T telephone switchboard

In the early 1920s, Iowa State College professor George Snedecor worked to improve the school's science and engineering departments, experimenting with new punch-card machines and calculators. Snedecor also worked with human calculators, most of whom were women, including Mary Clem. Clem coined the term "zero check" to help identify errors in calculations. The computing lab, run by Clem, became one of the most powerful computing facilities of the time.

Women computers also worked at the American Telephone and Telegraph company. These human computers worked with electrical engineers to help figure out how to boost signals with vacuum tube amplifiers. One of the computers, Clara Froelich, was eventually moved along with the other computers to their own division where they worked with a mathematician, Thornton Fry, to create new computational methods. Froelich studied IBM tabulating equipment and desk calculating machines to see if she could adapt the machine method to calculations.

Edith Clarke was the first woman to earn a degree in electrical engineering and who worked as the first professionally employed electrical engineer in the United States. She was hired by General Electric as a full engineer in 1923. Clarke also filed a patent in 1921 for a graphical calculator to be used in solving problems in power lines. It was granted in 1925.

=== 1930s ===
The National Advisory Committee for Aeronautics (NACA), which ultimately became NASA, hired a group of five women in 1935 to work as a computer pool. The women worked on the data coming from wind tunnel and flight tests.

The Works Progress Administration hired women as human calculators in order to support engineers during World War II. This was largely seen as menial labor, and much of the work was focused on calculations and less on problem solving.

Barbara Canright was recruited for California’s Jet Propulsion Laboratory in 1939 as a human calculator, largely working with engineers in order to determine thrust-to-weight ratios and other various aeronautics calculations.

=== 1940s ===
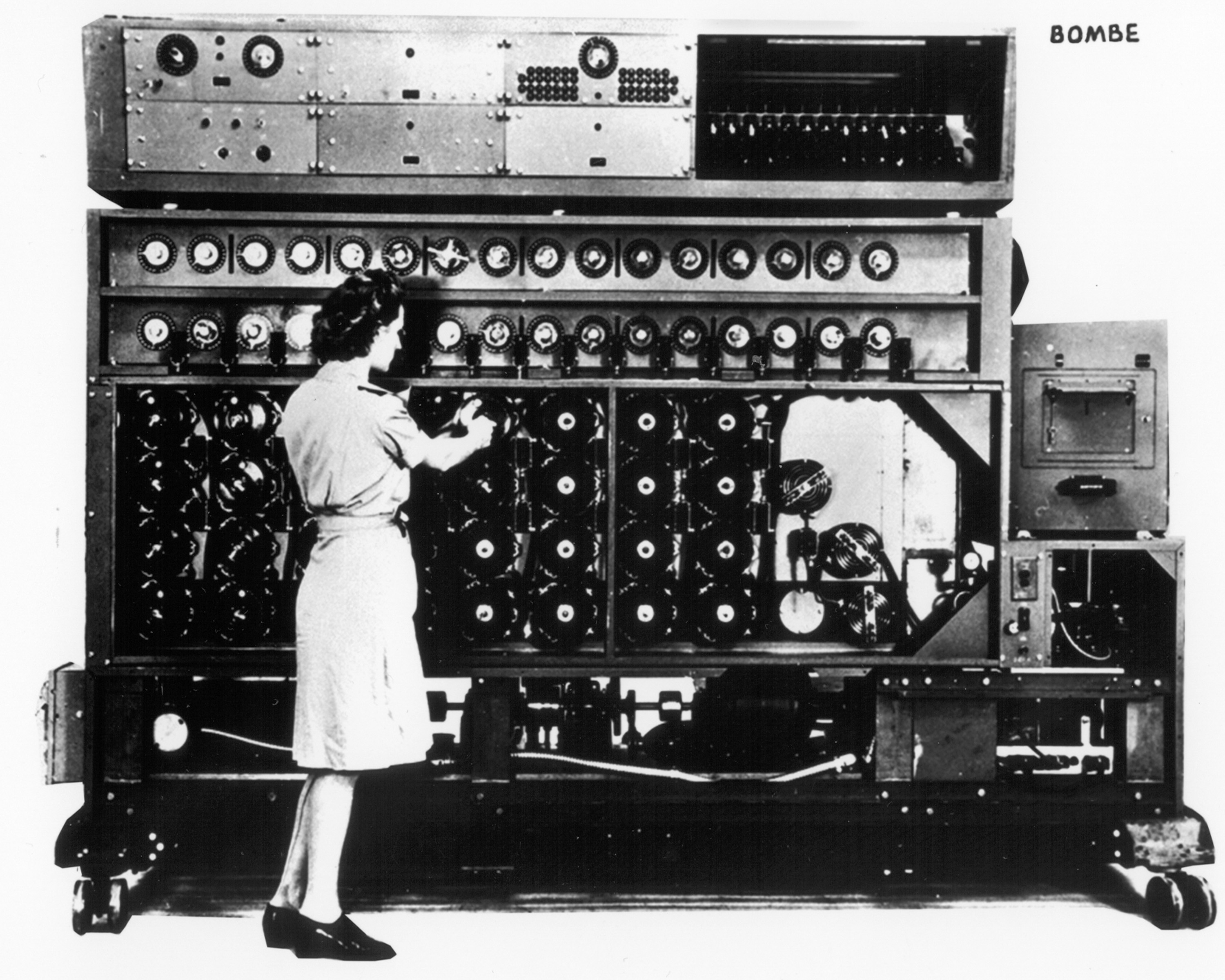
Woman working on a Bombe computing device

"Tedious" computing and calculating was seen as "women's work" through the 1940s, resulting in the term "kilogirl", coined by a member of the Applied Mathematics Panel in the early 1940s. A "kilogirl" of energy was "equivalent to roughly a thousand hours of computing labor." While women's contributions to the United States war effort during World War II were championed in the media, their roles and the nature of the work they did was minimized. This included minimizing the complexity, skill and knowledge needed to work on computers or work as human computers. During WWII, women did most of the ballistics computing, seen by male engineers as being below their level of expertise. Black women computers worked as hard (or more often, even harder) as their white counterparts, but in segregated situations. By 1943, almost all people employed as computers were women; one report said "programming requires lots of patience, persistence and a capacity for detail and those are traits that many girls have". Technology historian Mar Hicks wrote in Programmed Inequality that "women were the largest trained technical workforce of the computing industry during the second world war and through to the mid-sixties."

NACA expanded its pool of women human computers in the 1940s. NACA recognized in 1942 that "the engineers admit themselves that the girl computers do the work more rapidly and accurately than they could." In 1943, two groups, segregated by race, worked on the east and west side of Langley Air Force Base. The black women were the West Area Computers. Unlike their white counterparts, the black women were asked by NACA to re-do college courses they had already passed and many never received promotions.

Women were also working on ballistic missile calculations. In 1948, women such as Barbara Paulson were working on the WAC Corporal, determining trajectories the missiles would take after launch.

Women worked with cryptography, including on Bombe machines. Joyce Aylard operated the Bombe machine, testing different methods to break the Enigma code. Joan Clarke was a cryptographer who worked with her friend, Alan Turing, on the Enigma machine at Bletchley Park. When she was promoted to a higher salary grade, there were no positions in the civil service for a "senior female cryptanalyst," and she was listed as a linguist instead. Clarke developed a method for increasing the speed of double-encrypted messages, but unlike many of her male colleagues, her decryption technique was not named after her. Other cryptographers at Bletchley included Margaret Rock, Mavis Lever (later Batey), Ruth Briggs and Kerry Howard. In 1941, Batey's work enabled the Allies to break the Italians' naval code before the Battle of Cape Matapan. In the United States, several faster Bombe machines were created. Women, like Louise Pearsall, were recruited from the WAVES to work on code breaking and operate the American Bombe machines.

Hedy Lamarr and co-inventor, George Antheil, worked on a frequency hopping method to help the Navy control torpedoes remotely. The Navy passed on their idea, but Lamarr and Antheil received a patent for the work on August 11, 1942. This technique would later be used again, first in the 1950s at Sylvania Electronic Systems Division and ultimately in technology such as Bluetooth and Wi-Fi.

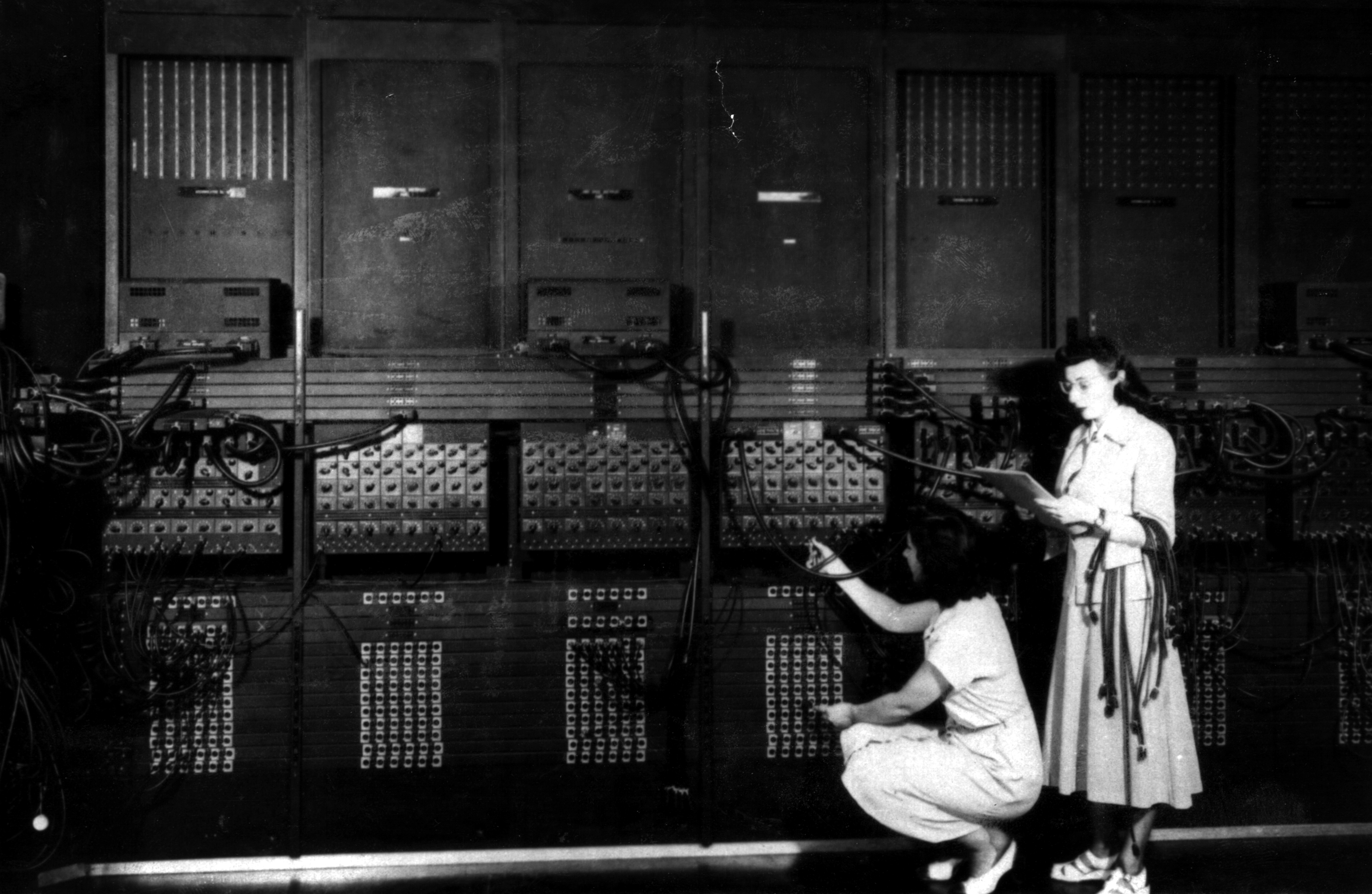
Ester Gerston (standing) and Gloria Gordon Bolotsky reprogram the ENIAC in 1946

The programmers of the ENIAC computer in 1944, were six female mathematicians; Marlyn Meltzer, Betty Holberton, Kathleen Antonelli, Ruth Teitelbaum, Jean Bartik, and Frances Spence, who were human computers at the Moore School's computation lab. Adele Goldstine was their teacher and trainer and they were known as the "ENIAC girls." The women who worked on ENIAC were warned that they would not be promoted into professional ratings which were only for men. Designing the hardware was "men's work" and programming the software was "women's work." Sometimes women were given blueprints and wiring diagrams to figure out how the machine worked and how to program it. They learned how the ENIAC worked by repairing it, sometimes crawling through the computer, and by fixing "bugs" in the machinery. Even though the programmers were supposed to be doing the "soft" work of programming, in reality, they did that and fully understood and worked with the hardware of the ENIAC. When the ENIAC was revealed in 1946, Goldstine and the other women prepared the machine and the demonstration programs it ran for the public. None of their work in preparing the demonstrations was mentioned in the official accounts of the public events. After the demonstration, the university hosted an expensive celebratory dinner to which none of the ENIAC six were invited.

In Canada, Beatrice Worsley started working at the National Research Council of Canada in 1947 where she was an aerodynamics research officer. A year later, she started working in the new Computational Centre at the University of Toronto. She built a differential analyzer in 1948 and also worked with IBM machines in order to do calculations for Atomic Energy of Canada Limited. She went to study the EDSAC at the University of Cambridge in 1949. She wrote the program that was run the first time EDSAC performed its first calculations on May 6, 1949.

Grace Hopper was the first person to create a compiler for a programming language and one of the first programmers of the Harvard Mark I computer, an electro-mechanical computer based on Analytical Engine. Hopper's work with computers started in 1943, when she started working at the Bureau of Ordnance's Computation Project at Harvard. There, she programmed the Harvard Mark I and created a 500-page comprehensive manual for it. Even though Hopper created the manual, which was widely cited and published, she was not specifically credited in it. Hopper is often credited with the coining of the term "bug" and "debugging" when a moth caused the Mark II to malfunction. However, while a moth was found and the process of removing it was called "debugging," those terms were already part of the language of programmers.

=== 1950s ===
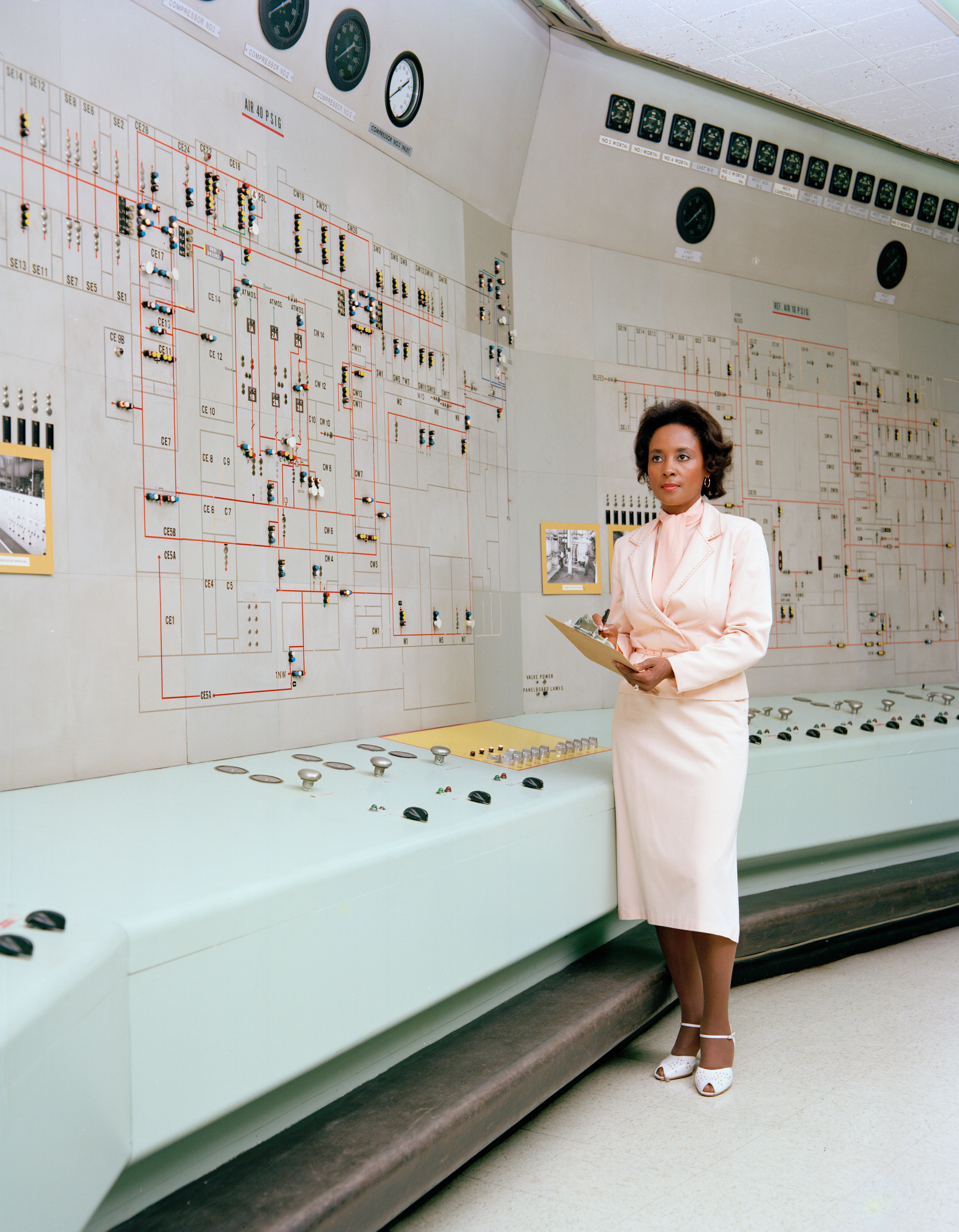
Annie Easley at NASA

Grace Hopper continued to contribute to computer science through the 1950s. She brought the idea of using compilers from her time at Harvard to UNIVAC which she joined in 1949. Other women who were hired to program UNIVAC included Adele Mildred Koss, Frances E. Holberton, Jean Bartik, Frances Morello and Lillian Jay. To program the UNIVAC, Hopper and her team used the FLOW-MATIC programming language, which she developed. Holberton wrote a code, C-10, that allowed for keyboard inputs into a general-purpose computer. Holberton also developed the Sort-Merge Generator in 1951 which was used on the UNIVAC I. The Sort-Merge Generator marked the first time a computer "used a program to write a program." Holberton suggested that computer housing should be beige or oatmeal in color which became a long-lasting trend. Koss worked with Hopper on various algorithms and a program that was a precursor to a report generator.

Klara Dan von Neumann was one of the main programmers of the MANIAC, a more advanced version of ENIAC. Her work helped the field of meteorology and weather prediction. Mary Tsingou developed and ran code on MANIAC to model the evolution of interacting waves on a string, a problem suggested by Enrico Fermi, John Pasta, and Stanislaw Ulam. They discovered a paradox whereby a system expected to thermalise instead showed quasi-periodic behaviour. The problem became known as the Fermi-Pasta-Ulam-Tsingou problem, and spawned the use of computers for numerical experiments in nonlinear science.

The NACA, and subsequently NASA, recruited women computers following World War II. By the 1950s, a team was performing mathematical calculations at the Lewis Research Center in Cleveland, Ohio, including Annie Easley, Katherine Johnson and Kathryn Peddrew. At the National Bureau of Standards, Margaret R. Fox was hired to work as part of the technical staff of the Electronic Computer Laboratory in 1951. In 1956, Gladys West was hired by the U.S. Naval Weapons Laboratory as a human computer. West was involved in calculations that let to the development of GPS.

At Convair Aircraft Corporation, Joyce Currie Little was one of the original programmers for analyzing data received from the wind tunnels. She used punch cards on an IBM 650 which was located in a different building from the wind tunnel. To save time in the physical delivery of the punch cards, she and her colleague, Maggie DeCaro, put on roller skates to get to and from the building faster.

In Israel, Thelma Estrin worked on the design and development of WEIZAC, one of the world's first large-scale programmable electronic computers. In the Soviet Union a team of women helped design and build the first digital computer in 1951. In the UK, Kathleen Booth worked with her husband, Andrew Booth on several computers at Birkbeck College. Kathleen Booth was the programmer and Andrew built the machines. Kathleen developed Assembly Language at this time.

In Britain, Mary Coombs was employed in 1952 as the first female programmer to work on the LEO computers, and as such she is recognized as the first female commercial programmer. Ukrainian Kateryna Yushchenko created Address (programming language) for the cоmputer "Kyiv" in 1955 and invented indirect addressing of the highest rank, called pointers.

=== 1960s ===
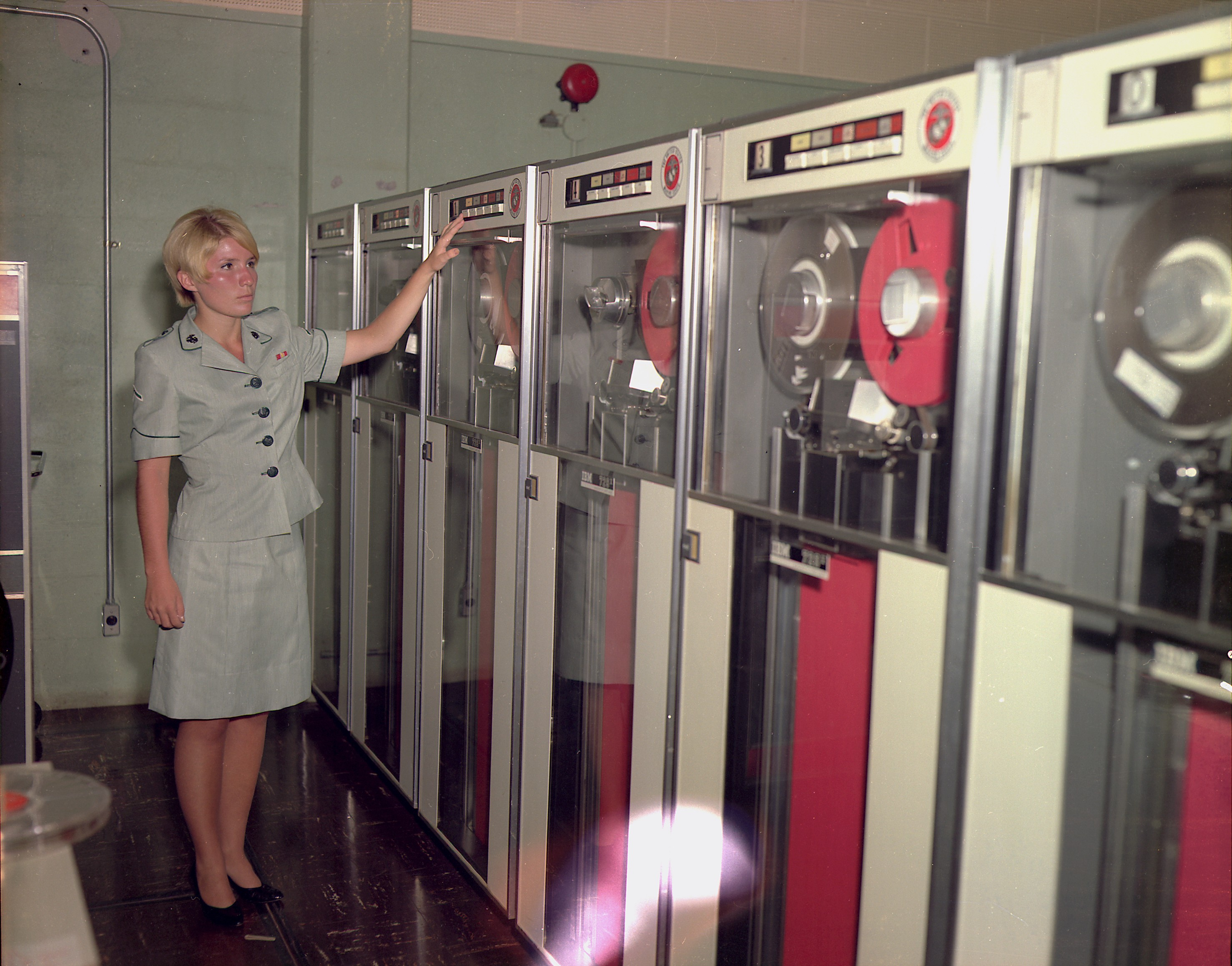
PFC Patricia Barbeau operates a tape-drive on the IBM 729 at Camp Smith.

Milly Koss who had worked at UNIVAC with Hopper, started work at Control Data Corporation (CDC) in 1965. There she developed algorithms for graphics, including graphic storage and retrieval.

Mary K. Hawes of Burroughs Corporation set up a meeting in 1959 to discuss the creation a computer language that would be shared between businesses. Six people, including Hopper, attended to discuss the philosophy of creating a common business language (CBL). Hopper became involved in developing COBOL (Common Business Oriented Language) where she innovated new symbolic ways to write computer code. Hopper developed programming language that was easier to read and "self-documenting." After COBOL was submitted to the CODASYL Executive Committee, Betty Holberton did further editing on the language before it was submitted to the Government Printing Office in 1960. IBM was slow to adopt COBOL, which hindered its progress but it was accepted as a standard in 1962, after Hopper had demonstrated the compiler working both on UNIVAC and RCA computers. The development of COBOL led to the generation of compilers and generators, most of which were created or refined by women such as Koss, Nora Moser, Deborah Davidson, Sue Knapp, Gertrude Tierney and Jean E. Sammet.

Sammet, who worked at IBM starting in 1961 was responsible for developing the programming language, FORMAC. She published a book, Programming Languages: History and Fundamentals (1969), which was considered the "standard work on programming languages," according to Denise Gürer It was "one of the most used books in the field," according to The Times in 1972.

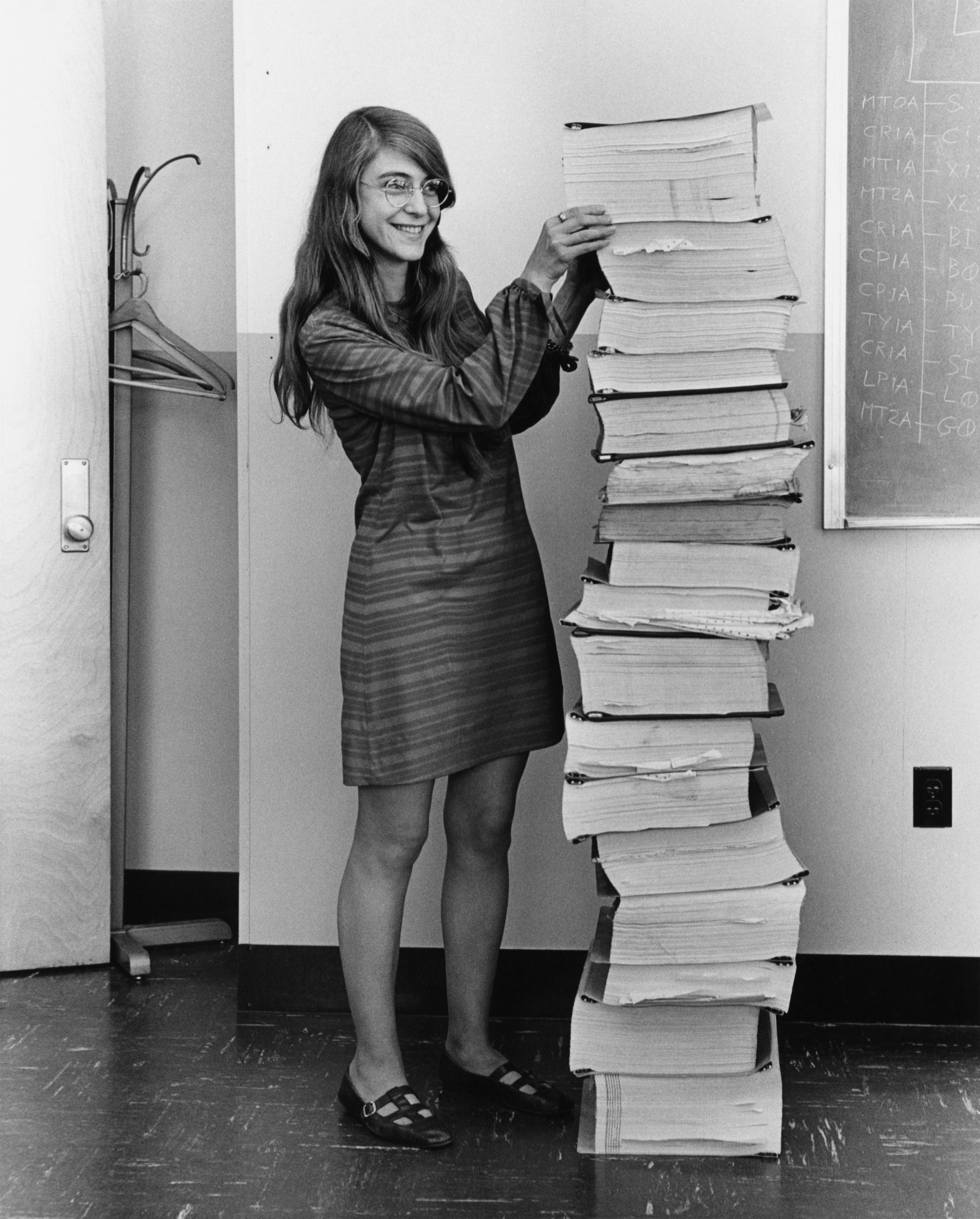
Margaret Hamilton in 1969, standing next to listings of the software she and her MIT team produced for the Apollo project

Between 1961 and 1963, Margaret Hamilton began to study software reliability while she was working at the US SAGE air defense system. In 1965, she was responsible for programming the software for the onboard flight software on the Apollo mission computers. After Hamilton had completed the program, the code was sent to Raytheon where "expert seamstresses" called the "Little Old Ladies" actually hardwired the code by threading copper wire through magnetic rings. Each system could store more than 12,000 words that were represented by the copper wires.

In 1964, the British Prime Minister Harold Wilson announced a "White-Hot" revolution in technology that would give greater prominence to IT work. As women still held most computing and programming positions at this time, it was hoped that it would give them more positive career prospects. In 1965, Sister Mary Kenneth Keller became the first American woman to earn a doctorate in computer science. Keller helped develop BASIC while working as a graduate student at Dartmouth, where the university "broke the 'men only' rule" so she could use its computer science center.

In 1966, Frances "Fran" Elizabeth Allen, who was developing programming language compilers at IBM Research, published a paper entitled "Program Optimization." It laid out the conceptual basis for systematic analysis and transformation of computer programs. This paper introduced the use of graph-theoretic structures to encode program content in order to automatically and efficiently derive relationships and identify opportunities for optimization.

Christine Darden began working for NASA's computing pool in 1967 having graduated from the Hampton Institute. Women, including Judy Clapp, were involved in the development of the vacuum tube computer, Whirlwind. Clapp created the prototype for an air defense system for Whirlwind which used radar input to track planes in the air and could direct aircraft courses.

In 1969, Elizabeth "Jake" Feinler, who was working for Stanford, made the first Resource Handbook for ARPANET. This led to the creation of the ARPANET directory, which was built by Feinler with a staff of mostly women. Without the directory, "it was nearly impossible to navigate the ARPANET."

In the UK, Dame Stephanie Shirley launched the software company Freelance Programmers, offering the chance for women to work from home and or opt for part-time work. When her business was thwarted by sexism, she changed her name to Steve Shirley:

At first Shirley had an uphill struggle to win clients, but after she took to signing her letters of introduction as Steve instead of Stephanie, the work began to flow in. Major clients included the Anglo-French partnership that developed the supersonic Concorde airliner, for which Shirley’s cottage industry workers programmed the black box flight recorder.

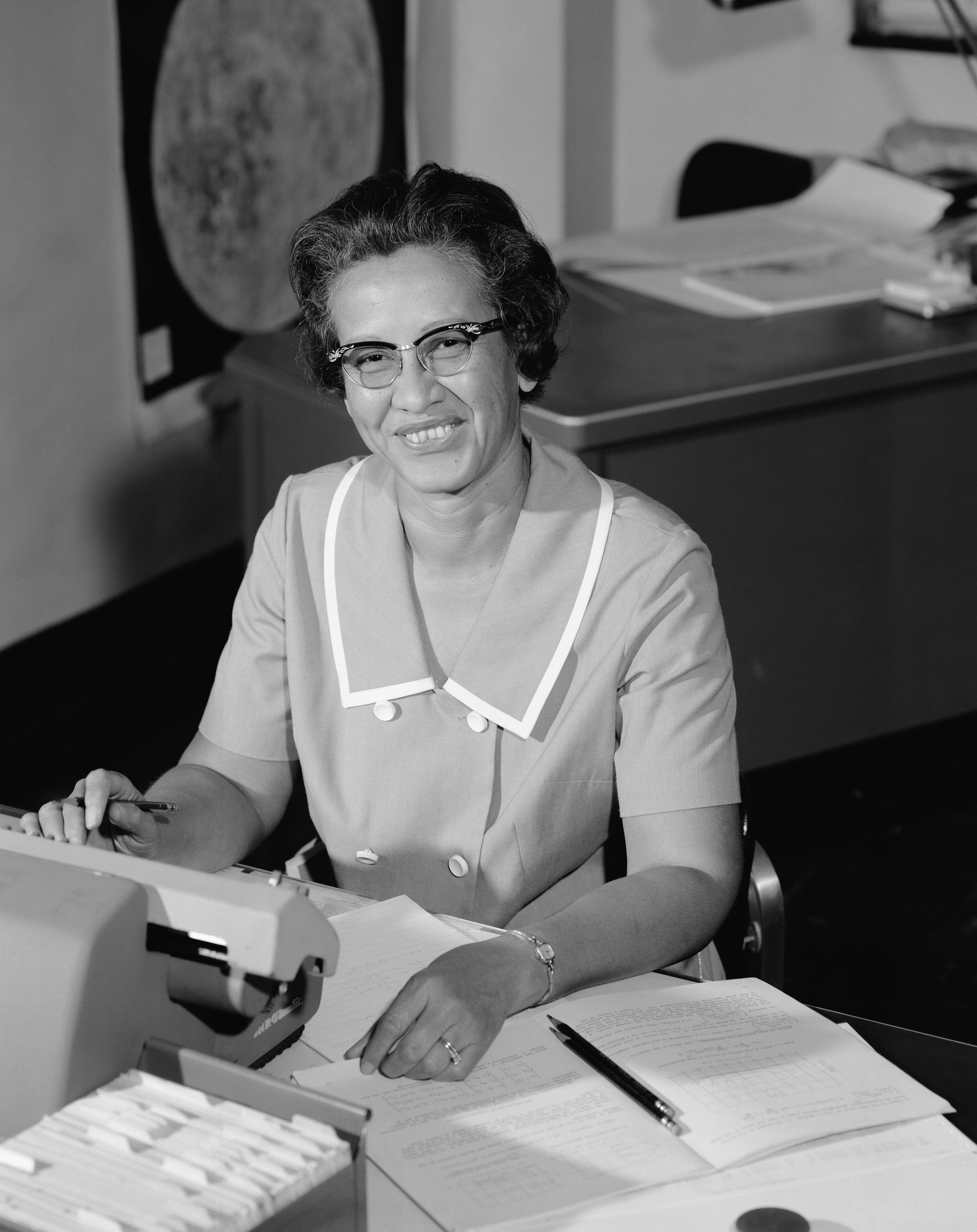
Katherine Johnson working at NASA in 1966

By the end of the decade, the general demographics of programmers had shifted away from being predominantly women, as they had before the 1940s. Though women accounted for around 30 to 50 percent of computer programmers during the 1960s, few were promoted to leadership roles and women were paid significantly less than their male counterparts. Cosmopolitan ran an article in the April 1967 issue about women in programming called "The Computer Girls." Even while magazines such as Cosmopolitan saw a bright future for women in computers and computer programming in the 1960s, the reality was that women were being increasingly marginalized.

=== 1970s ===
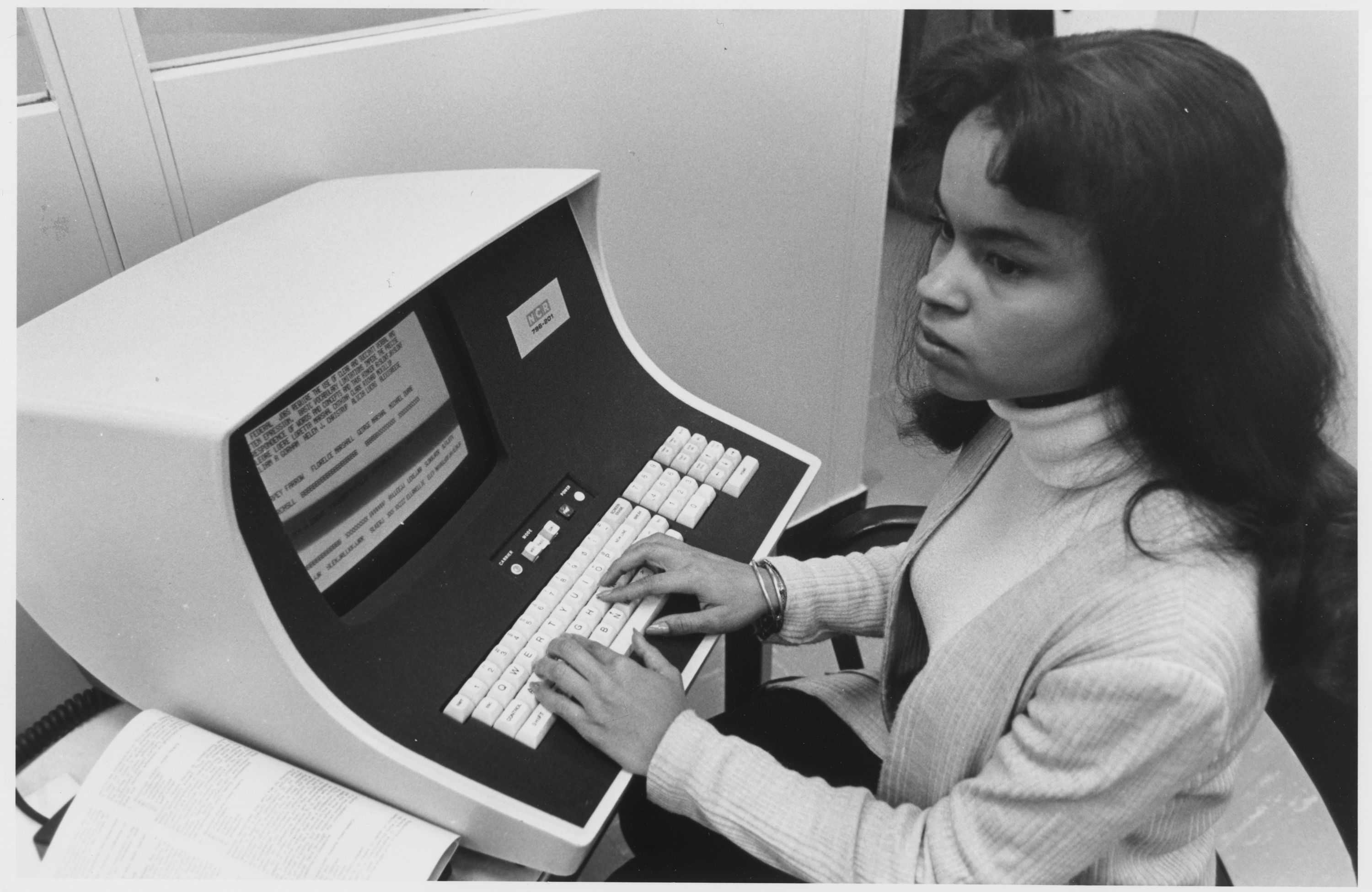
Using an NCR 796-201 cathode-ray terminal, circa 1972

In the early 1970s, Pam Hardt-English led a group to create a computer network they named Resource One and which was part of a group called Project One. Her idea to connect Bay Area bookstores, libraries and Project One was an early prototype of the Internet. To work on the project, Hardt-English obtained an expensive SDS-940 computer as a donation from TransAmerica Leasing Corporation in April 1972. They created an electronic library and housed it in a record store called Leopold's in Berkeley. This became the Community Memory database and was maintained by hacker Jude Milhon. After 1975, the SDS-940 computer was repurposed by Sherry Reson, Mya Shone, Chris Macie and Mary Janowitz to create a social services database and a Social Services Referral Directory. Hard copies of the directory, printed out as a subscription service, were kept at city buildings and libraries. The database was maintained and in use until 2009.

In the early 1970s, Elizabeth "Jake" Feinler, who worked on the Resource Directory for ARPANET, and her team created the first WHOIS directory. Feinler set up a server at the Network Information Center (NIC) at Stanford which would work as a directory that could retrieve relevant information about a person or entity. She and her team worked on the creation of domains, with Feinler suggesting that domains be divided by categories based on where the computers were kept. For example, military computers would have the domain of .mil, computers at educational institutions would have .edu. Feinler worked for NIC until 1989.

Jean E. Sammet served as the first woman president of the Association for Computing Machinery (ACM), holding the position between 1974 and 1976.

Adele Goldberg was one of seven programmers that developed Smalltalk in the 1970s, and wrote the majority of the language's documentation. It was one of the first object-oriented programming languages the base of the current graphic user interface, that has its roots in the 1968 The Mother of All Demos by Douglas Engelbart. Smalltalk was used by Apple to launch Apple Lisa in 1983, the first personal computer with a GUI, and a year later its Macintosh. Windows 1.0, based on the same principles, was launched a few months later in 1985.

In the late 1970s, women such as Paulson and Sue Finley wrote programs for the Voyager mission. Voyager continues to carry their codes inside its own memory banks as it leaves the Solar System. In 1979, Ruzena Bajcsy founded the General Robotics, Automation, Sensing and Perception (GRASP) Lab at the University of Pennsylvania.

In the mid-70s, Joan Margaret Winters began working at IBM as part of a "human factors project," called SHARE. In 1978, Winters was the deputy manager of the project and went on to lead the project between 1983 and 1987. The SHARE group worked on researching how software should be designed to consider human factors.

Erna Schneider Hoover developed a computerized switching system for telephone calls that would replace switchboards. Her software patent for the system, issued in 1971, was one of the first software patents ever issued.

=== 1980s ===
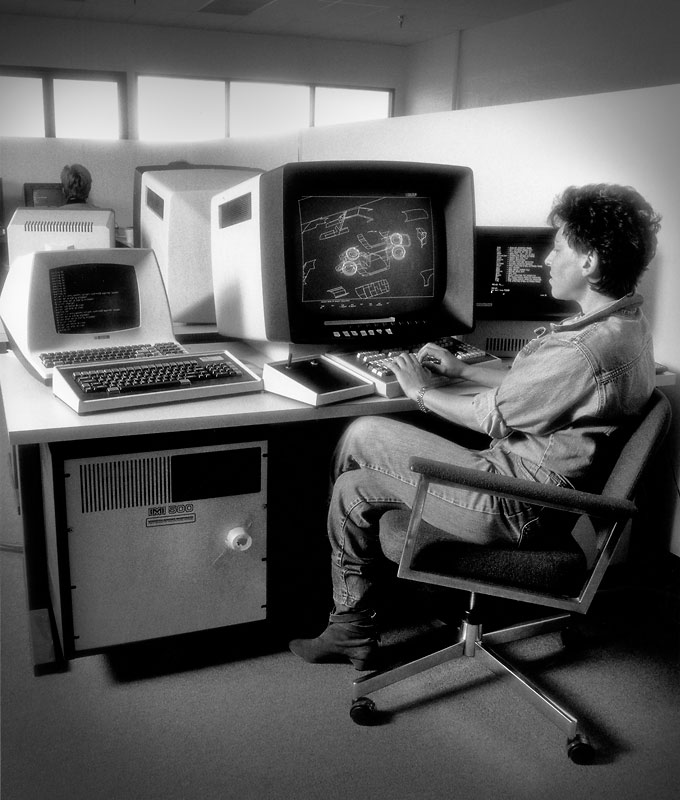
Shelley Lake working on computer graphics at Digital Productions, 1983

Gwen Bell developed the Computer Museum in 1980. The museum, which collected computer artifacts became a non-profit organization in 1982 and in 1984, Bell moved it to downtown Boston. Adele Goldberg served as president of ACM between 1984 and 1986.

In 1981, Deborah Washington Brown became the first African American woman to earn a Ph.D. in computer science from Harvard University (at the time the degree was part of the applied mathematics program). Her thesis was titled "The solution of difference equations describing array manipulation in program loops". Shortly after, in 1982, Marsha R. Williams became the second African American woman to earn a Ph.D. in computer science.

Sometimes known as the "Betsy Ross of the personal computer," according to the New York Times, Susan Kare worked with Steve Jobs to design the original icons for the Macintosh. Kare designed the moving watch, paintbrush and trash can elements that made using a Mac user-friendly. Kare worked for Apple until the mid-1980s, going on to work on icons for Windows 3.0. Other types of computer graphics were being developed by Nadia Magnenat Thalmann in Canada. Thalmann started working on computer animation to develop "realistic virtual actors" first at the University of Montréal in 1980 and later in 1988 at the École Polytechnique Fédérale de Lausanne.

Computer and video games became popular in the 1980s, but many were primarily action-oriented and not designed from a woman's point of view. Stereotypical characters such as the damsel in distress featured prominently and consequently were not appealing to women. Dona Bailey designed Centipede, where the player shoots insects, as a reaction to such games, later saying "It didn't seem bad to shoot a bug". Carol Shaw, considered to be the first modern female games designer, released a 3D version of tic-tac-toe for the Atari 2600 in 1980. Roberta Williams and her husband Ken, founded Sierra Online and pioneered the graphic adventure game format in Mystery House and the King's Quest series. The games had a friendly graphical user interface and introduced humor and puzzles. Williams's influence spread from Sierra to other companies such as LucasArts and beyond. Brenda Laurel ported games from arcade versions to the Atari 8-bit computers in the late 1970s and early 1980s. She then went to work for Activision and later wrote the manual for Maniac Mansion.

1984 was the year of Women into Science and Engineering (WISE Campaign). A 1984 report by Ebury Publishing reported that in a typical family, only 5% of mothers and 19% of daughters were using a computer at home, compared to 25% of fathers and 51% of sons. To counteract this, the company launched a series of software titles designed towards women and publicized in Good Housekeeping. Anita Borg, who had been noticing that women were under-represented in computer science, founded an email support group, Systers, in 1987.

As Ethernet became the standard for networking computers locally, Radia Perlman, who worked at Digital Equipment Corporation (DEC), was asked to "fix" limitations that Ethernet imposed on large network traffic. In 1985, Perlman came up with a way to route information packets from one computer to another in an "infinitely scalable" way that allowed large networks like the Internet to function. Her solution took less than a few days to design and write up. The name of the algorithm she created is the Spanning Tree Protocol. In 1986, Lixia Zhang was the only woman and graduate student to participate in the early Internet Engineering Task Force (IETF) meetings. Zhang was involved in early Internet development.

In Europe, a project was developed in the mid-1980s to create an academic network in Europe using the Open System Interconnection (OSI) standards. Borka Jerman Blažič, a Yugoslavian computer scientist, was invited to work on the project. She was involved in establishing the Yugoslav Research and Academic Network (YUNAC) in 1989 and registered the domain of .yu for the country.

In the field of human–computer interaction (HCI), French computer scientist, Joëlle Coutaz developed the presentation-abstraction-control (PAC) model in 1987. She founded the User Interface group at the Laboratorire de Génie Informatique of IMAG where they worked on different problems relating to user interface and other software tools.

In 1988, Stacy Horn, who had been introduced to bulletin board systems (BBS) through The WELL, decided to create her own online community in New York, which she called the East Coast Hang Out (ECHO). Horn invested her own money and pitched the idea for ECHO to others after bankers refused to hear her business plan. Horn built her BBS using UNIX, which she and her friends taught to one another. Eventually ECHO moved an office in Tribeca in the early 1990s and started getting press attention. ECHO's users could post about topics that interested them, and chat with one another, and were provided email accounts. Around half of ECHO's users were women. ECHO was still online as of 2018.

=== 1990s ===
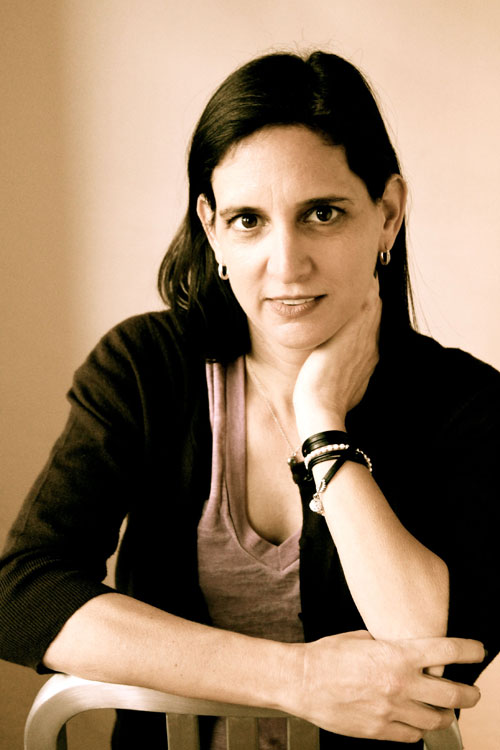
Jaime Levy helped popularise the e-Zine in the 1990s.

By the 1990s, computing was dominated by men. The proportion of female computer science graduates peaked in 1984 around 37 percent, and then steadily declined. Although the end of the 20th century saw an increase in women scientists and engineers, this did not hold true for computing, which stagnated. Despite this, women in the field in this era were deeply involved with hypertext and hypermedia projects. A team of women at Brown University, including Nicole Yankelovich and Karen Catlin, developed Intermedia and invented the anchor link. Apple partially funded their project and incorporated their concepts into Apple operating systems. Sun Microsystems Sun Link Service was developed by Amy Pearl. Janet Walker developed the first system to use bookmarks when she created the Symbolics Document Examiner. In 1989, Wendy Hall created a hypertext project called Microcosm, which was based on digitized multimedia material found in the Mountbatten archive. Cathy Marshall worked on the NoteCards system at Xerox PARC. NoteCards went on to influence Apple's HyperCard. As the Internet became the World Wide Web, developers like Hall adapted their programs to include Web viewers. Her Microcosm was especially adaptable to new technologies, including animation and 3-D models. In 1994, Hall helped organize the first conference for the Web.

Sarah Allen, the co-founder of After Effects, co-founded a commercial software company called CoSA in 1990. In 1995, she started working on the Shockwave team for Macromedia where she was the lead developer of the Shockwave Mulituser Server, the Flash Media Server and Flash video.

Following the increased popularity of the Internet in the 1990s, online spaces were set up to cater for women, including the online community Women's WIRE and the technical and support forum LinuxChix. Women's WIRE, launched by Nancy Rhine and Ellen Pack in October 1993, was the first Internet company to specifically target this demographic. A conference for women in computer-related jobs, the Grace Hopper Celebration of Women in Computing, was first launched in 1994 by Anita Borg.

Game designer Brenda Laurel started working at Interval Research in 1992, and began to think about the differences in the way girls and boys experienced playing video games. After interviewing around 1,000 children and 500 adults, she determined that games weren't designed with girls' interests in mind. The girls she spoke with wanted more games with open worlds and characters they could interact with. In 1996, her research led to Interval Research giving Laurel's research team their own company, Purple Moon. Also in 1996, Mattel's game, Barbie Fashion Designer, became the first best-selling game for girls. Purple Moon's first two games based on a character called Rockett, were among the 100 best-selling games during the years they were released. In 1999, Mattel bought out Purple Moon.

Jaime Levy created one of the first e-Zines in the early 1990s, starting with CyberRag, which included articles, games and animations loaded onto diskettes that anyone with a Mac could access. Later, she renamed the zine to Electronic Hollywood. Billy Idol commissioned Levy to create a disk for his album, Cyberpunk. She was hired to be the creative director of the online magazine, Word, in 1995.

Cyberfeminist collective VNS Matrix, made up of Josephine Starrs, Juliane Pierce, Francesca da Rimini and Virginia Barratt, created art in the early 1990s linking computer technology and women's bodies. In 1997, there was a gathering of cyberfeminists in Kassel, called the First Cyberfeminist International.

In China, Hu Qiheng, was the leader of the team who installed the first TCP/IP connection for China, connecting to the Internet on April 20, 1994. In 1995, Rosemary Candlin went to write software for CERN in Geneva. In the early 1990s, Nancy Hafkin was an important figure in working with the Association for Progressive Communications (APC) in enabling email connections in 10 African countries. Starting in 1999, Anne-Marie Eklund Löwinder began to work with Domain Name System Security Extensions (DNSSEC) in Sweden. She later made sure that the domain, .se, was the world's first top level domain name to be signed with DNSSEC.

In the late 1990s, research by Jane Margolis led Carnegie Mellon to try to correct the male-female imbalance in computer science.

From the late 1980s until the mid-1990s, Misha Mahowald developed several key foundations of the field of Neuromorphic engineering, while working at the California Institute of Technology and later at the ETH Zurich. More than 20 years after her untimely death, the Misha Mahowald Prize was named after her to recognize excellence in the field which she helped to create.

=== 2000s ===
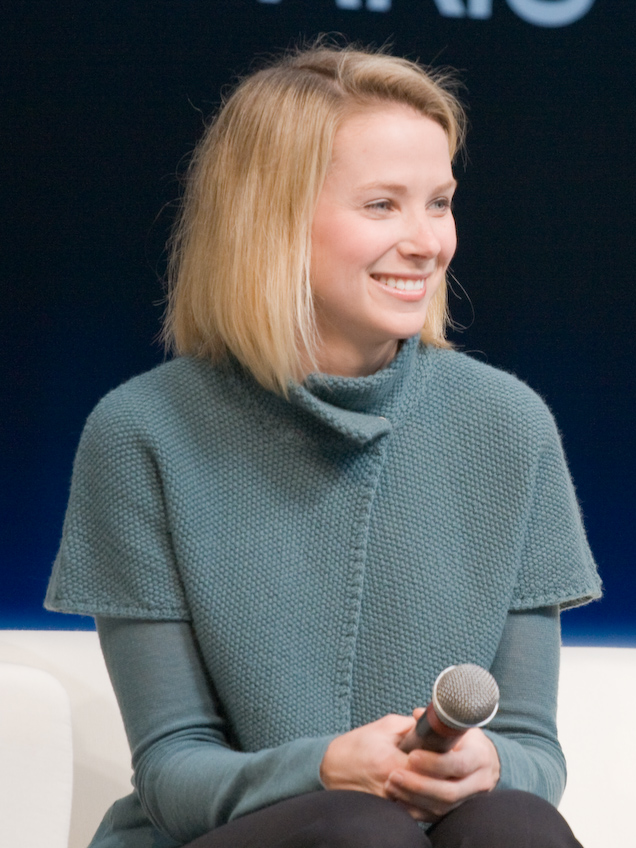
Former vice-president of Google Search Products and User Experience, former president and CEO of Yahoo!, Marissa Mayer

In the 21st century, numerous attempts have been made to reduce the gender disparity in IT and get more women involved in computing again. A 2001 survey found that while both sexes use computers and the internet in equal measure, women were still five times less likely to choose it as a career or study the subject beyond standard secondary education. Journalist Emily Chang said a key problem has been personality tests in job interviews and the belief that good programmers are introverts, which tends to self-select the stereotype of the "antisocial, mostly white male nerd."

In 2004, the National Center for Women & Information Technology was established by Lucy Sanders to address the gender gap. Carnegie Mellon University has made a concerted attempt to increase gender diversity in the computer science field, by selecting students based on a wide criteria including leadership ability, a sense of "giving back to the community" and high attainment in maths and science, instead of traditional computer programming expertise. As well as increase the intake of women into CMU, the programme produced better quality students because of the increased diversity making a stronger team.

=== 2010s ===
Despite the pioneering work of some designers, video games are still considered biased towards men. A 2013 survey by the International Game Developers Association revealed only 22% of game designers are women, although this is substantially higher than figures in previous decades. Working to bring inclusion to the world of open source project development, Coraline Ada Ehmke drafted the Contributor Covenant in 2014. By 2018, over 40,000 software projects have started using the Contributor Covenant, including TensorFlow, Vue and Linux. In 2014, Danielle George, professor at the School of Electrical and Electronic Engineering, University of Manchester spoke at the Royal Institution Christmas Lectures on the subject of "how to hack your home", describing simple experiments involving computer hardware and demonstrating a giant game of Tetris by remote controlling lights in an office building.

In 2013, a National Public Radio report said 20% of computer programmers in the US are female.

In 2017, Michelle Simmons founded the first quantum computing company in Australia. The team, which has made "great strides" in 2018, plans to develop a 10-qubit prototype silicon quantum integrated circuit by 2022. In the same year, Doina Precup became the head of DeepMind Montreal, working on artificial intelligence. Xaviera Kowo is a programmer from Cameroon, who won the Margaret award, for programming a robot which processes waste in 2022.

=== 2020s ===
In 2023 the EU-Startups, the leading online publication with a focus on startups in Europe, published the list of top 100 of the most influential women in the startup and venture capital space in Europe. The theme of the list reflects the era of innovation and technological change, and encourages a new generation of female for entrepreneurship and innovation.

According to Women in Tech, as of 2023, women held only 35% of tech jobs in the US despite making up 53% of the civilian labor force.

== Gender gap in computing ==
While computing began as a field heavily dominated by women, this changed in western countries shortly after World War II. In the US, recognizing software development was a significant expense, companies wanted to hire an "ideal programmer". Psychologists William Cannon and Dallis Perry were hired to develop an aptitude test for programmers, and from an industry that was then more than 50% women, they selected 1400 people, 1200 of whom were male. This paper was highly influential and claimed to have "trained the industry" in hiring programmers, with a heavy focus on introverts and men. In Britain, following the war, women programmers were selected for redundancy and forced retirement, which contributed to the country losing its position as computer science leader by 1974.

There are a variety of theories around the continued gender disparity in computing. A significant issue is that women find themselves working in an environment that is unpleasant, or even hostile, so they decline to continue in those careers. In 2020, 48 percent of women tech employees said they had been harassed at work, most often by a supervisor, with 43 percent of that group saying the harassment was sexual in nature; in contrast, only 11 percent of male tech employee reported harassment. A further issue is that if a class of computer scientists contains few women, those few can be singled out, leading to isolation and feelings of non-belonging, which can culminate in leaving the area. In the same 2020 survey, 7 in 10 women in tech said they were treated differently due to their gender, versus about 1 in 10 men.

The gender disparity in IT is not global. The ratio of female to male computer scientists is significantly higher in India compared to the West, and in 2015, over half of internet entrepreneurs in China were women. In Europe, Bulgaria and Romania have the highest rates of women going into computer programming. In government universities in Saudi Arabia in 2014, Arab women made up 59% of students enrolled in computer science. It has been suggested there is a greater gap in countries where people of both sexes are treated more equally, contradicting any theories that society in general is to blame for the disparity. However, the ratio of African American female computer scientists in the US is significantly lower than the global average. In IT-based organisations, the ratio of men to women can vary between roles; for example, while most software developers at InfoWatch are male, half of usability designers and 80% of project managers are female.

In 1991, Massachusetts Institute of Technology undergraduate Ellen Spertus wrote an essay "Why Are There So Few Women in Computer Science?", examining inherent sexism in IT, which was responsible for a lack of women in computing. She subsequently taught computer science at Mills College, Oakland in order to increase interest in IT for women.

The University of Southampton's Wendy Hall has said the attractiveness of computers to women decreased significantly in the 1980s when they "were sold as toys for boys", and believes the cultural stigma has remained ever since. Kathleen Lehman, project manager of the BRAID Initiative at UCLA has said a problem is that typically women aim for perfection and feel disillusioned when code does not compile, whereas men may simply treat it as a learning experience. A report in the Daily Telegraph suggested that women generally prefer people-facing jobs, which many computing and IT positions do not have, while men prefer jobs geared towards objects and tasks.

== Awards ==
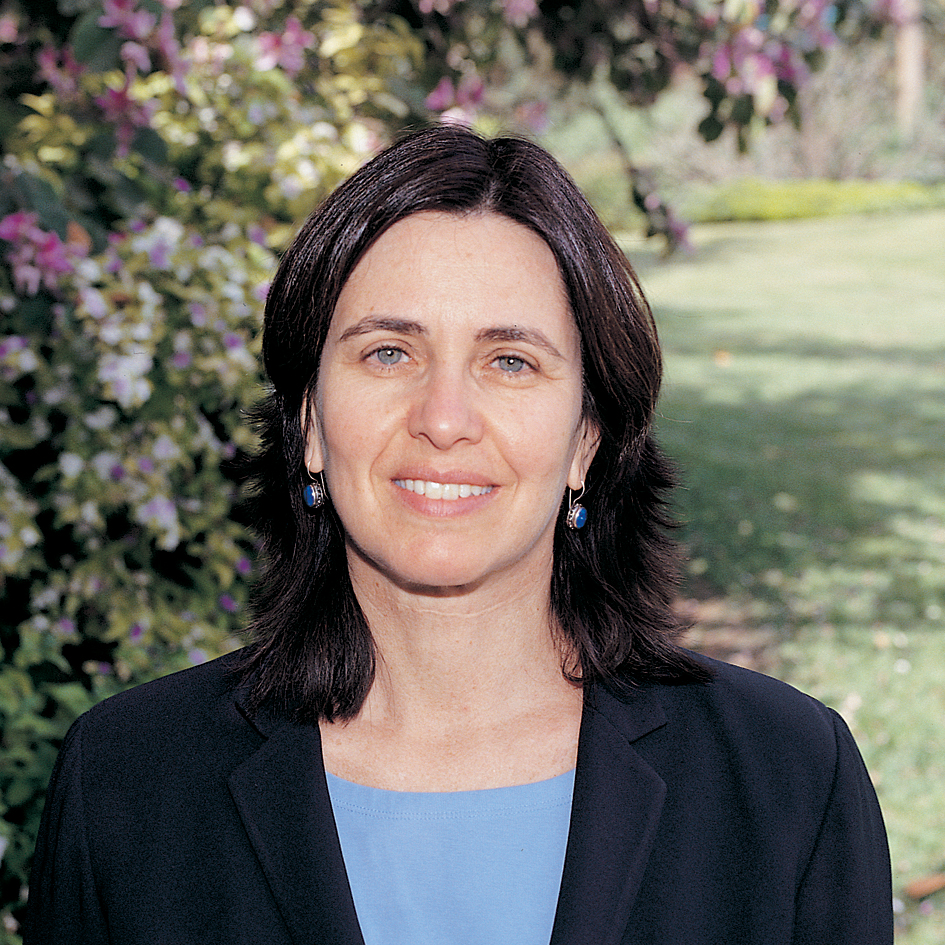
Shafi Goldwasser was the 2012 Turing award recipient for her collaborative work in cryptography.

The Association for Computing Machinery Turing Award, sometimes referred to as the "Nobel Prize" of computing, was named in honor of Alan Turing. This award has been won by three women between 1966 and 2015.

- 2006 – Frances "Fran" Elizabeth Allen
- 2008 – Barbara Liskov
- 2012 – Shafi Goldwasser

The British Computer Society Information Retrieval Specialist Group (BCS IRSG) in conjunction with the British Computer Society created an award in 2008 to commemorate the achievements of Karen Spärck Jones, a Professor Emerita of Computers and Information at the University of Cambridge and one of the most remarkable women in computer science. The KSJ award has been won by four women between 2009 and 2017:

- 2009 – Mirella Lapata
- 2012 – Diane Kelly
- 2016 – Jaime Teevan

== Organizations ==
Several important groups have been established to encourage women in the IT industry. The Association for Women in Computing was one of the first and is dedicated to promoting the advancement of women in computing professions. The CRA-W: Committee on the Status of Women in Computing Research established in 1991 focused on increasing the number of women in Computer Science and Engineering (CSE) research and education at all levels. AnitaB.org runs the Grace Hopper Celebration of Women in Computing yearly conference. The National Center for Women & Information Technology is a nonprofit that aims to increase the number of women in technology and computing. The Women in Technology International (WITI) is a global organization dedicated to the advancement of women in business and technology. The Arab Women in Computing has many chapters across the world and focuses on encouraging women to work with technology and provides networking opportunities between industry experts and academicians and university students.

Some major societies and groups have offshoots dedicated to women. The Association for Computing Machinery's Council on Women in Computing (ACM-W) has over 36,000 members. BCSWomen is a women-only specialist group of the British Computer Society, founded in 2001. In Ireland, the charity Teen Turn run after school training and work placements for girls, and Women in Technology and Science (WITS) advocate for the inclusion and promotion of women within STEM industries.

The Women's Technology Empowerment Centre (W.TEC) is a non-profit organization focused on providing technology education and mentoring to Nigerian women and girls. Black Girls Code is a non-profit focused on providing technology education to young African-American women.

Other organisations dedicated to women in IT include Girl Develop It, a nonprofit organization that provides affordable programs for adult women interested in learning web and software development in a judgment-free environment, Girl Geek Dinners, an International group for women of all ages, Girls Who Code: a national non-profit organization dedicated to closing the gender gap in technology, LinuxChix, a women-oriented community in the open source movement and Systers, a moderated listserv dedicated to mentoring women in the IT industry.

== See also ==
- Hidden Figures – 2016 film by Theodore Melfi
- List of female mathematicians
- List of female scientists
- List of organizations for women in science
- List of women astronauts
- List of prizes, medals, and awards for women in science
- List of women in the video game industry
- Timeline of women in computing
- Women and video games
- Women in computing in Canada
- Women in engineering
- Women in science
- Women in STEM fields
- Women in the workforce
- Women in venture capital
