= Okorafor =

Okorafor is a Nigerian surname. Notable people with it include:

- Chukwuma Okorafor (born 1997), Nigerian football player
- Nnedi Okorafor (born 1974), Nigerian-American writer
- Unoma Ndili Okorafor (born 1974), Nigerian computer scientist and entrepreneur
