= AnitaB.org =

US-based nonprofit for women in tech

- Founded: 1997
- Type: 501(c)(3) Nonprofit organization
- Purpose: Women in computing
- Location: Sacramento, California
- Region served: Global
- Method: Grace Hopper Celebration of Women in Computing Conference
- Key people: Anita Borg (co-founder); Telle Whitney (co-founder); Brenda Darden Wilkerson (President & CEO)
- Website: AnitaB.org
- Formerly called: Institute for Women in Technology (1997–2003); Anita Borg Institute for Women and Technology/ABI (2003–2017)

AnitaB.org (formerly Anita Borg Institute for Women and Technology (ABI), and Institute for Women in Technology) is a global, technical nonprofit organization based in Sacramento, California. Founded by computer scientists Anita Borg and Telle Whitney for technical women, the institute's primary aim is to recruit, retain, and advance women in technology.

The institute's most prominent program is the Grace Hopper Celebration of Women in Computing Conference, the world's largest gathering of women in computing. From 2002 to 2017, AnitaB.org was led by Telle Whitney, who co-founded the Grace Hopper Celebration of Women in Computing with Anita Borg.

AnitaB.org is currently led by Brenda Darden Wilkerson, the former Director of Computer Science and IT Education for Chicago Public Schools (CPS) and founder of the original “Computer Science for All” initiative.

== History ==
AnitaB.org was founded in 1997 by computer scientists Anita Borg and Telle Whitney as the Institute for Women in Technology. The institute was preceded by two of its current programs: Systers and the Grace Hopper Celebration of Women in Computing Conference. Systers, the first online community for women in computing, was founded in 1987 by Anita Borg. In 1994, Borg and Whitney organized the first Grace Hopper Celebration of Women in Computing.

Anita Borg served as CEO of the Institute for Women in Technology from 1997 to 2002. In 2002, Whitney became president and CEO, and in 2003, the institute was renamed the Anita Borg Institute for Women and Technology (ABI). In 2017, Whitney retired and Brenda Darden Wilkerson took over as president and CEO. The organization was also renamed AnitaB.org.

== Activities ==
=== Grace Hopper Celebration of Women in Computing Conference ===
The Grace Hopper Celebration of Women in Computing conference is the world's largest gathering of women in computing. Named in honor of Rear Admiral Grace Murray Hopper, the conference is presented by AnitaB.org and the Association for Computing Machinery (ACM). The conference features technical sessions and career sessions, including keynote speakers, a poster session, career fair, and awards ceremony. The 2022 conference was held in a hybrid fashion - Orlando, Florida and virtual. The 2017 conference was held in Orlando, Florida. The 2018 conference was held in Houston, Texas.

The Technical Executive Forum, held annually at the Grace Hopper Celebration of Women in Computing, brings together high-level technology executives to discuss challenges and solutions for recruiting, retaining, and advancing technical women. A two-day workshop for K–12 computer science teachers is also held at the conference, hosted by the Computer Science Teachers Association and the AnitaB.org.

=== Grace Hopper Celebration of Women in Computing India ===
The Grace Hopper Celebration of Women in Computing India is the largest conference for technical women in India. Established in 2010, the two-day conference is modeled after the Grace Hopper Celebration of Women in Computing and includes multiple tracks with keynote speakers, panels, social networking sessions, and a poster session.

=== Grace Hopper Regional Consortium ===
The Grace Hopper Regional Consortium is an initiative of AnitaB.org, the ACM Council on Women in Computing, and the National Center for Women & Information Technology. Two-day regional conferences attract between 50 and 200 attendees and include keynote speakers, poster sessions, panel discussions, professional development workshops, birds of a feather (Twitter) sessions, and research presentations. There have been 17 regional conferences to date, with 12 upcoming conferences planned.

=== Abie Awards ===
The Abie Awards honor women technologists and those who support women in tech. There are a total of eight Abie Awards: the Technical Leadership Abie Award, Student of Vision Abie Award, Emerging Technologist Abie Award, Educational Abie Award in Honor of A. Richard Newton, Social Impact Abie Award, Technology Entrepreneurship Abie Award, Emerging Leader Abie Award in Honor of Denice Denton, and Change Agent Abie Award.

Previously, AnitaB.org hosted an annual Women of Vision Awards Banquet where three Abie Awards were presented. However, it was decided that it was more fitting to present the Abie Awards at Grace Hopper Celebration (GHC), the world's largest gathering of women technologists. The final Women of Vision Awards Banquet was held in 2016.

Now, five Abie Awards are presented at every GHC (the Technical Leadership Abie Award and Student of Vision Abie Award are awarded every year, while the remaining awards alternate each year). Past Abie Award winners include: Kathy Pham, Noreen Hecmanczuk, Mary Lou Jepsen, Kristina M. Johnson, Mitchell Baker, Helen Greiner, Susan Landau, Justine Cassell, Deborah Estrin, Leah Jamieson, Duy-Loan Le, Radia Perlman, Nimmi Ramanujam, Fei Fei Li, Lisa Su, Rebecca Parsons, Margaret Burnett, and Pamela Samuelson.

The 2022 Abie Award Winners were:

1. Daphne Koller, Ph.D. (San Francisco, California) - Technical Leadership Award Winner
2. Kris Dorsey, Ph.D. (Boston, Massachusetts) - Emerging Leader Award in Honor of Denice Denton Award Winner
3. Katherine Vergara (Santiago, Chile) - Student of Vision Award Winner
4. Paula Coto (Ciudad Autonoma de Buenos Aires, Argentina) - Change Agent Award Winner
5. Neha Narkhede (Menlo Park, California) - Technology Entrepreneurship Award Winner

=== Anita Borg Top Company for Technical Women Award ===
The Anita Borg Top Company for Technical Women Award recognizes companies for their recruitment, retention, and advancement of technical women. The first Anita Borg Top Company for Technical Women Award was awarded to IBM in 2011. Subsequent recipients include:

- 2012 – American Express
- 2013 – Intel
- 2014 – Bank of America
- 2015 – BNY Mellon
- 2016 – ThoughtWorks
- 2020 Small Company - The New York Times Company
- 2020 Medium Sized Company - UKG
- 2020 - Large Sized Company - ADP
- 2022 - Small Technical Workforce (<1,000 employees) was awarded to Dev Technology Group. Medium Technical Workforce (1,000-10,000 employees) was awarded to UKG. Large Technical Workforce (>10,000 employees) was awarded to ADP.

=== Anita Borg Top Company for Technical Women Workshop ===
The Anita Borg Top Company for Technical Women Workshop provides coverage of best practices for recruiting, retaining, and advancing technical women. Representatives from different companies learn from each other and share practices. Companies participating in the 2011 workshop included CA Technologies, Cisco, Google, IBM, Intel, Intuit, Microsoft Research, SAP, and Symantec.

=== TechWomen ===
TechWomen is a professional mentorship and exchange program funded by the U.S. Department of State’s Bureau of Educational and Cultural Affairs. The program brings 38 technical women, aged 25–42, from the Middle East and North Africa to the United States for a five-week mentoring program at technology companies in Silicon Valley. The initiative is administered by the Institute of International Education, in partnership with AnitaB.org.

=== Online communities ===
The AnitaB.org runs several email lists and online groups that connect technical women. Systers is the largest email community of technical women in computing in the world and predates AnitaB.org, having been founded in 1987 by Anita Borg. Systers provides a private and gender exclusive space for women in computing to ask personal and technical questions.

=== Local communities ===
The AnitaB.org local Communities usually referred to as ABI.local is a network of locally organized communities that bring women technologists together in cities around the world. These communities organize events and meet up, where women in tech get connected, find new opportunities and meet their career goals. ABI.local has been Featured in various cities across the globe including Chicago, London, Nairobi, Amsterdam, Seattle, Tokyo, Houston, New York, Delhi and more.

=== Research ===
AnitaB.org publishes research about the state of women in technology. Past reports have focused on mid-level technical women, ethnic minorities in computing, senior technical women, and more.

== Corporate partners ==
AnitaB.org is supported by corporate partners within and outside of the technology sector. Current notable partners include:

- Amazon
- Cisco
- Facebook
- Google
- HP
- IBM
- Intel
- Intuit
- Microsoft
- National Science Foundation (NSF)
- National Security Agency (NSA)
- SAP
- Symantec
- Thomson Reuters
- Salesforce.com

In 2017, Forbes, Fortune, and other outlets notably reported that the organization severed ties with Uber over its treatment of female employees and lack of engagement.

== See also ==
- Ada Initiative
- The Ada Project (TAP)
- Anita Borg
- Sexism in the technology industry
- Women in computing
