= The Ada Project =

Website providing information on organisations supportive of women in technology

The Ada Project (TAP) is a website providing information on events, funding, positions and organisations supportive of women in technology. It links to resources about the history of women in computing, aiding in the historical rediscovery of women's roles in the field.

Originally created at Yale University in 1994, the resource has been maintained by Carnegie Mellon University since 2005.

== See also ==
- Anita Borg Institute for Women and Technology
- Discrimination
- Sexism in the technology industry
- Women in computing
