= Association for Women in Computing =

- Founded: 1978
- Purpose: Women in Computing
- Location: Washington, D.C.
- Region served: National
- Method: Professional organization
- Website: www.awc-hq.org/home.html

The Association for Women in Computing (AWC) is a professional organization for women in computing. It was founded in 1978 in Washington, D.C., and is a member of the Institute for Certification of Computing Professionals (ICCP).

== Purpose ==
The purpose of AWC is to provide opportunities for professional growth for women in computing through networking, continuing education and mentoring. To accomplish this they promote awareness of issues affecting women in the computing industry, further the professional development and advancement of women in computing, and encourage women to pursue careers in computer science. The AWC is a national, nonprofit, professional organization for women and men with an interest in information technology. It grants the Ada Lovelace Award to individuals who have excelled in either of two areas: outstanding scientific technical achievement and/or extraordinary service to the computing community through accomplishments and contributions on behalf of women in computing.

== History ==
AWC was founded in 1978 as a non-profit organization, originally under the name National Association for Women in Computing. The Puget Sound Chapter was founded in the winter of 1979 by Donnafaye Carroll Finger and Diane Haelsig. These two women read an article about a new association for women in computing and were soon discussing the formation of a Puget Sound Chapter. The Twin Cities Chapter of the AWC first met in December 1979, and became a chartered chapter on 6 May 1981.

== Chapters ==
AWC has chapters in:

- Montana State University
- New Jersey
- Seattle, Washington
- Twin Cities, Minnesota
- Puget Sound Washington

== See also ==
- ACM-W
- Ada Lovelace Award
- Anita Borg
- Grace Hopper Celebration of Women in Computing
- Women in computing
