= Liuba =

Liuba may refer to:

- Liuba, a Slavic feminine given name cognate to Lyuba
  - Liuba Chișinevschi (1911–1981), Romanian communist activist
  - Liuba Dragomir, Moldovan football player
  - Liuba Gantcheva, Bulgarian intellectual and writer
  - Liuba María Hevia, singer and composer from Cuba
  - Liuba Grechen Shirley, American politician
  - Liuba Shrira, American university professor
- Liuba County, a subdivision of China
