= Stella Atkins =

Canadian computer scientist

- Known for: Founding member of Systers

Academic background
- Education: University of Nottingham; University of Warwick; University of British Columbia

Academic work
- Discipline: Computer science
- Institutions: Simon Fraser University
- Main interests: Medical imaging

Stella Atkins is a Professor Emeritus in computing science at Simon Fraser University in Canada, and one of the founding members of the Systers community for technical women in computing. Her primary research interests are in medical computing (includes laparoscopic surgery, sleep studies and telehealth) and medical image display and analysis.

== Education ==
Atkins grew up in England with an intense interest in math. Her father was an engineer and her mother, a statistician. She enjoyed reading math books for fun but because her sister was studying mathematics in college, she wanted to take a different route and pursued chemistry studies instead. When choosing a university, Atkins chose University of Nottingham in England, because chemist Dorothy Hodgkin, who had just received a Nobel Prize in Chemistry, was there.

After Atkins received her B.Sc. in chemistry from Nottingham University (1966), she went on to work at the Shell Refining Company as a chemical engineer. There she performed simulations of oil refineries and oil flow, and developed her interest in computing.

Atkins later became a scientific computer programmer advisor at the University of Warwick in England and received her M.Phil. in computer science from there in 1976. In 1985, Atkins received a Ph.D. in computer science from the University of British Columbia.
