= Grace Hopper Celebration of Women in Computing =

American conference for women in computing

- Abbreviation: GHC
- Discipline: Computer science

Publication details
- Publisher: Anita Borg Institute for Women and Technology and Association for Computing Machinery
- History: 1994–present
- Frequency: Annual

The Grace Hopper Celebration of Women in Computing (GHC) is a series of conferences designed to bring the research and career interests of women in computing to the forefront. It is the world's largest gathering of women and non-binary technologists. The celebration, named after computer scientist Grace Hopper, is organized by the Anita Borg Institute for Women and Technology. The GHC 2022 conference was held hybrid in 2022, and the conference returned to an in-person event in 2025.

== History ==
In 1994, Anita Borg and Telle Whitney founded the Grace Hopper Celebration of Women in Computing. With the initial idea of creating a conference by and for women computer scientists, Borg and Whitney met over dinner, with a blank sheet of paper, having no idea how to start a conference, and started to plan out their vision. The first Grace Hopper Celebration of Women in Computing was held in Washington, D.C., in June 1994, and brought together 500 technical women. More than a dozen conferences have been held from 1994 to the present; the second was held in 1997 and the conference has been held annually since 2006. The sold-out 2010 conference attracted 2,147 attendees from 29 countries. Beginning in 2011, the conference has been held in a convention center to accommodate its growing size.

The 2026 conference had been scheduled to be held in Anaheim, California, but was canceled two weeks before the scheduled October 27 start date due to a lack of funds.

== Conference structure ==
The Grace Hopper Celebration consists of a combination of technical sessions and career sessions and includes a poster session, career fair, awards ceremony, and more. The conference features 650 presenters. Potential presenters submit proposals for panels, workshops, presentations, Birds of a Feather sessions, New Investigators papers, PhD Forum, and Poster Session, including ACM Student Research Competition.

=== Tracks/content ===
The Grace Hopper Celebration 2022 featured content in 14 tracks:

1. Academic
2. Artificial Intelligence
3. Career
4. Computer Systems Engineering
5. Data Science
6. Diversity, Equity, Inclusion & Belonging
7. Extended Reality, Media and Gaming
8. Hardware
9. Human Computer Interaction
10. Non- Traditional Technology
11. Open Source & Open Source Day
12. Product Management
13. Security/Privacy
14. Software Engineering

=== Keynote speakers ===
The Grace Hopper Celebration features prominent women in technology. Keynote speakers at Grace Hopper Celebration 2022 included Daphe Koller, Dr. Anita Hill, Megan Rapinoe, Anne Neuberger and Frances Haugen.

Past keynote speakers included Sheryl Sandberg, Shirley Jackson, Carol Bartz, Duy-Loan Le, Kathy Pham, Megan Smith, Ginni Rometty, Nonny de la Peña, Maria Klawe, Frances E. Allen, Mary Lou Jepsen, Barbara Liskov, Susan Landau, Jennifer Mankoff, Vivienne Ming, Susan L. Graham, Melinda Gates, and Fernanda Viegas. Speaker presentations are available to watch online after the conference.

=== Poster session and ACM Student Research Competition ===
The Grace Hopper Celebration features one of the largest technical poster sessions of any conference, with over 175 posters. Presenters can choose to have their posters considered for the ACM Student Research Competition (SRC) at the Grace Hopper Celebration, the largest SRC of any technical conference.

=== Awards ===
The Abie Awards honor women technologists and those who support women in tech. The 2022 Abie Award Winners were:

1. Daphne Koller (San Francisco, California) - Technical Leadership Award Winner
2. Kris Dorsey (Boston, Massachusetts) - Emerging Leader Award in Honor of Denice Denton Award Winner
3. Katherine Vergara (Santiago, Chile) - Student of Vision Award Winner
4. Paula Coto (Ciudad Autonoma de Buenos Aires, Argentina) - Change Agent Award Winner
5. Neha Narkhede (Menlo Park, California) - Technology Entrepreneurship Award Winner

Past Abie Award winners include Ruzena Bajcsy, BlogHer, Elaine Weyuker and Unoma Ndili Okorafor.

=== CRA-W career mentoring workshops ===
The Computing Research Association’s Committee on the Status of Women in Computing Research (CRA-W) sponsors a series of sessions at the Grace Hopper Celebration aimed at undergraduates, graduates, and early career researchers. Sessions cover topics such as applying to graduate school, publishing papers, networking, work-life balance, and more.

=== K-12 Computing Teachers Workshop ===
Hosted by the Computer Science Teachers Association and the Anita Borg Institute for Women and Technology, the K-12 Computing Teachers Workshop is a two-day event for K-12 teachers, covering challenges and ways to involve more girls in computer science. The workshop began in 2009, attracting more than 650 applications its first year.

=== Technical Executive Forum ===
Begun in 2007, the Technical Executive Forum convenes high-level technology executives to discuss challenges and share solutions for recruiting, retaining, and advancing technical women. In 2010, 65 executives attended the event, from companies including Microsoft, Google, and Symantec.

=== Senior Women’s Summit ===
The Senior Women's Summit is a one-day event held at the Grace Hopper Celebration, that brings together senior-level women to discuss issues facing senior technical women and provide a learning and networking platform.

=== Grace Hopper Open Source Day ===
Grace Hopper Open Source Day was held for the first time in 2011. One-day registration is open to the public and included for all conference attendees. The event includes a codeathon, skill-building workshop, and exhibition space featuring open source projects.

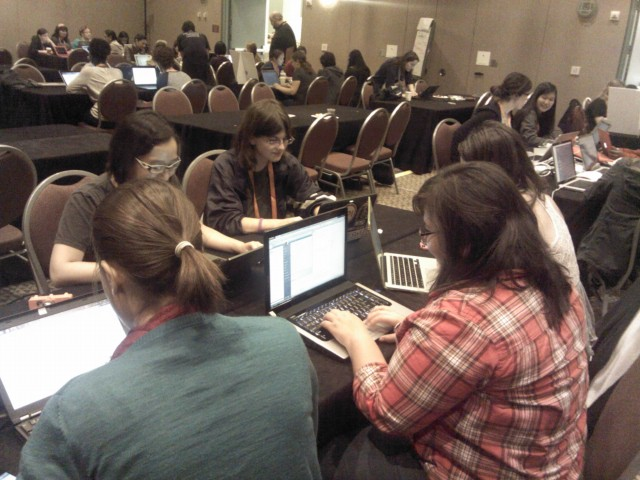
Group collaborating on Wikimedia projects at Grace Hopper Open Source Day

Participating organizations have included Google Crisis Response, Mozilla, Sahana Software Foundation, The Women's Peer-to-Peer Network, ODK, Microsoft Disaster Response, OpenHatch, Wikimedia Foundation, E-Democracy, Systers, WordPress and OpenStack.

=== Career fair ===
The Grace Hopper Celebration features a career fair with over 70 high-tech companies, government labs, and universities.

=== Scholarships ===
Students make up approximately half of the attendees at the Grace Hopper Celebration. The Anita Borg Institute offers scholarships to undergraduate and graduate students to attend the conference. The scholarship includes:

- Individual registration for the three-day conference
- Hotel accommodations
- Meal card for use at the convention center during the conference
- Airfare
- Travel stipend

In 2010, 321 scholarships were awarded. In addition to the GHC Scholarship, Anita Borg Institute offers the ABI-Heinz College Partnership Program. This is designed for students who have successfully completed their bachelor's degree, have been named a GHC Scholar by AnitaB.org, and are interested in obtaining a master's degree from the Heinz College at Carnegie Mellon University. GHC Scholars who are accepted into master's programs at the Heinz college are eligible for tuition scholarships of a minimum of $6,000 per semester.

=== Childcare and nursing mothers' room ===
The Grace Hopper Celebration offers free childcare to all attendees, as well as an on-site nursing mothers' room.

== Open Source Day ==
Open Source Day (OSD) is the largest celebration of women in open source. OSD is an all-day hackathon (including workshops) at Grace Hopper Celebration in which participants of all skill levels learn about Open Source while contributing to projects designed to solve real-world problems. OSD is organized in two parts: projects for contributions and hands-on workshops for upskilling.

=== Open Source Day 2022 ===
Open Source Day 2022 (OSD22) took place virtually on September 16, 2022 and was open to all GHC22 ticket holders for participation. The Opening Ceremony of OSD22 featured Anne Neuberger, Nithya Ruff and Mishi Choudhary. OSD22 hosted 27 open source projects and 10 workshops.

Participants contributed code to 27 open source projects.

== Criticisms ==
The GHC conference has been criticized for a lack of diversity, particularly racial diversity, and financial inaccessibility due to the high cost of attendance. In 2019, the cost of registration, not including hotel, transportation, or other costs, was $450 for students, $600 for academics, and $1,150 for general registration.

In 2015, GHC faced criticism, including from engineer Erica Baker, when two white men and zero black women were featured as "headline" speakers. The organization responded by targeting more diversity in speakers and collecting race and ethnicity data at the following year's event.

GHC does not pay its speakers. In past years GHC required speakers to purchase their own conference ticket, but as of 2020, speakers receive complimentary registration. (In the case of two selected poster presenters, only one will receive complimentary registration.) Speakers are not paid and travel and hotel expenses are not covered. The "pay to speak" approach has been criticized by people including author and software engineer Gayle Laakmann McDowell.

In 2023, female and non-binary attendees criticized the GHC 2022 event for being dominated by "pushy" cisgender men, some of whom were harassing the women present.

== List of Grace Hopper Celebrations ==
Past Grace Hopper Celebrations include:

| Year | Location | Theme | Date | # of attendees | Links |
|---|---|---|---|---|---|
| 2025 | Chicago, Illinois | "Unbound" | November 4–7, 2025 | | Website |
| 2022 | Orlando, Florida & Virtual event | "Next is Now" | September 20 – 23 | | Website |
| 2021 | Virtual event | "Dare To" | September 27 – Oct 1 | 29,120 | Website |
| 2020 | Virtual event | "Together We Build" | September 26, 29 - Oct 3 | | Website |
| 2019 | Orlando, Florida | "We Will Change the World" | October 2–4 | 25,000 | Website |
| 2018 | Houston, Texas | "We Are Here" | September 26–28 | 20,000 | Website |
| 2017 | Orlando, Florida | | October 4 – 6 | 18,000 | Website |
| 2016 | Houston, Texas | | October 19 – 21 | 15,000 | Website |
| 2015 | Houston, Texas | "Our Time to Lead" | October 14 – 16 | 11,702 | Website |
| 2014 | Phoenix, Arizona | "Everywhere. Everyone." | October 8 – 10 | 7,830 | Website |
| 2013 | Minneapolis, Minnesota | "Think Big. Drive Forward" | October 2 – 5 | 4,758 | Website |
| 2012 | Baltimore, Maryland | "Are We There Yet?" | October 3 – 6 | 3,592 | Website |
| 2011 | Portland, Oregon | "What If...?" | November 9 – 12 | 2,784 | Website |
| 2010 | Atlanta, Georgia | "Collaborating Across Boundaries" | Sep. 28 – Oct. 2 | 2,070 | Website |
| 2009 | Tucson, Arizona | "Creating Technology for Social Good" | Sep. 30 – Oct. 3 | 1,571 | Website |
| 2008 | Keystone, Colorado | "We Build a Better World" | Oct. 1 – 4 | 1,446 | Website |
| 2007 | Orlando, Florida | "I Invent the Future" | Oct. 17 – 20 | 1,430 | Website |
| 2006 | San Diego, California | "Making Waves" | Oct. 3 – 7 | 1,347 | Website |
| 2004 | Chicago, Illinois | "Making History" | Oct. 6 – 9 | 899 | Website |
| 2002 | Vancouver, Canada | "Ubiquity" | Oct. 9 – 12 | 630 | |
| 2000 | Hyannis, Massachusetts | "Interconnections" | Sep. 14 – 16 | 550 | |
| 1997 | San Jose, California | | Sep. 19 – 21 | 600 | |
| 1994 | Washington, D.C. | | June 9 – 11 | 500 | |

== See also ==
- List of awards honoring women
- Richard Tapia Celebration of Diversity in Computing
