= Anita Borg =

American computer scientist

- Born: Anita Borg Naffz; January 17, 1949; Chicago, Illinois
- Died: April 6, 2003 (aged 54); Sonoma, California
- Education: New York University (PhD)
- Known for: Systers; AnitaB.org; Grace Hopper Celebration of Women in Computing
- Scientific career
- Fields: Women in computing Human–computer interaction Computer science
- Workplaces: Nixdorf Computer; Digital Equipment Corporation; Xerox PARC
- Thesis: Synchronization Efficiency (1981)
- Doctoral advisor: Robert Dewar; Gerald Belpaire

Anita Borg (January 17, 1949 – April 6, 2003) was an American computer scientist celebrated for advocating for women’s representation and professional advancement in technology. She founded the Institute for Women and Technology and the Grace Hopper Celebration of Women in Computing.

== Education and early life ==
Borg was born Anita Borg Naffz in Chicago, Illinois. She grew up in Palatine, Illinois; Kaneohe, Hawaii; and Mukilteo, Washington. Borg got her first programming job in 1969. Although she loved math while growing up, she did not originally intend to go into computer science and taught herself how to program while working at a small insurance company. She was awarded a PhD in Computer Science by New York University in 1981 for research investigating the synchronization efficiency of operating systems supervised by Robert Dewar and Gerald Belpaire.

She died from brain cancer, in Sonoma, California on 6 April 2003.

== Career ==
After receiving her PhD, Borg spent four years building a fault tolerant Unix-based operating system, first for Auragen Systems Corp. of New Jersey and then with Nixdorf Computer in Germany.

In 1986, she began working for Digital Equipment Corporation, where she spent 12 years, first at the Western Research Laboratory. While at Digital Equipment, she developed and patented a method for generating complete address traces for analyzing and designing high-speed memory systems. Her experience running the ever-expanding Systers mailing list, which she founded in 1987, led her to work in email communication. As a consultant engineer in the Network Systems Laboratory under Brian Reid, she developed MECCA, an email and Web-based system for communicating in virtual communities.

In 1997, Borg left Digital Equipment Corporation and began working as a researcher in the Office of the Chief Technology Officer at Xerox PARC. Soon after starting at Xerox, she founded the Institute for Women and Technology, having previously founded the Grace Hopper Celebration of Women in Computing in 1994.

=== Advocacy for technical women ===
Borg passionately believed in working for greater representation of women in technology. Her goal was to have 50% representation for women in computing by 2020. She strove for technical fields to be places where women would be equally represented at all levels of the pipeline, and where women could impact, and benefit from, technology.

=== Systers ===
In 1987, Borg founded Systers, the first email network for women in technology. While attending the Symposium on Operating Systems Principles (SOSP), she was struck by how few women were present at the conference. She and six or seven other women met in the ladies' room and talked about how few women there were in computing. A dozen of the women at the conference made plans to eat lunch together, and that is where the idea for Systers was formed.

Systers was established to provide a private space for its members to seek input and share advice based on their common experiences. Systers membership was limited to women with highly technical training and discussions were strictly confined to technical issues. Borg oversaw Systers until 2000. Systers occasionally tackled issues that were not highly technical but pertained to its members. In 1992, when Mattel Inc. began selling a Barbie doll that said math class is tough, the voices of protest that started with the Systers list played a role in getting Mattel to remove that phrase from Barbie's microchip.

=== Grace Hopper Celebration of Women in Computing ===
In 1994, Anita Borg and Telle Whitney founded the Grace Hopper Celebration of Women in Computing. With the initial idea of creating a conference by and for women computer scientists, Borg and Whitney met over dinner, with a blank sheet of paper, having no idea how to start a conference, and started to plan out their vision. The first Grace Hopper Celebration of Women in Computing was held in Washington, D.C., in June 1994, and brought together 500 technical women.

=== Institute for Women and Technology ===
In 1997, Borg founded the Institute for Women and Technology (now the Anita Borg Institute for Women and Technology). Two important goals behind the founding of the organization were to increase the representation of women in technical fields and to enable the creation of more technology by women. When founded, the institute was housed at Xerox PARC, although it was an independent nonprofit organization. The institute was created to be an experimental R&D organization focusing on increasing the impact of women on technology and increasing the impact of technology on the world's women. It ran a variety of programs to increase the role of technology, build the pipeline of technical women, and ensure that women's voices affected technological developments.

In 2002, Telle Whitney took over as president and CEO of the institute, and in 2003, it was renamed in honor of Borg. Since its foundation, the Anita Borg Institute for Women and Technology has increased its programs in the United States and expanded internationally, more than quadrupling in size.

=== Awards and recognition ===
Borg was recognized for her accomplishments as a computer scientist, as well as for her work on behalf of women in computing. She received the Augusta Ada Lovelace Award from the Association for Women in Computing for her work on behalf of women in the computing field in 1995. In that same year, she also received the Pioneer Award from the Electronic Frontier Foundation. In 1996 she was inducted as a Fellow of the Association for Computing Machinery. In 1999, President Bill Clinton appointed her to the Presidential Commission on the Advancement of Women and Minorities in Science, Engineering, and Technology. She was charged with recommending strategies to the nation for increasing the breadth of participation fields for women.

In 2002, she was awarded the 8th Annual Heinz Award for Technology, the Economy and Employment. Also in 2002, Borg received an Honorary Doctor of Science and Technology degree from Carnegie Mellon University

Borg received the EFF Pioneer Award from the Electronic Frontier Foundation and was recognized by the Girl Scouts of the USA, as well as listed on Open Computing Magazine's Top 100 Women in Computing. Borg was also a member of the board of directors of the Computing Research Association and served as a member of the National Research Council's Committee on Women in Science and Engineering.

=== Legacy ===
In 1999, Borg was diagnosed with a brain tumor. She continued to lead the Institute for Women and Technology until 2002. She died on April 6, 2003, in Sonoma, California.

In 2003, the Institute for Women and Technology was renamed to the Anita Borg Institute for Women and Technology, in honor of Borg.

Several other awards and programs honor Borg's life and work. Google established the Google Anita Borg Memorial Scholarship in 2004 to honor the work of Borg. As of 2017 this program is known as the Women Techmakers Scholars Program. The program has expanded to include women in Canada, Australia, New Zealand, Europe, North Africa, and the Middle East. The UNSW School of Computer Science and Engineering offers the Anita Borg Prize, named in her honor.
