= Human Factors in Engineering and Design =

Engineering textbook

- 7th edition
- Author: Mark S. Sanders; Ernest J. McCormick
- Cover artist: Carla Bauer
- Subject: Human factors and ergonomics Interface design
- Published: 1957; 1976, 1982, 1987, 1993 (McGraw-Hill)
- Pages: 704 (7th ed.)
- ISBN: 978-0070549012 (7th ed.)
- Dewey Decimal: 620.8'2—dc20
- LC Class: TA166.S33

Human Factors in Engineering and Design is an engineering textbook, currently in its seventh edition. First published in 1957 by Ernest J. McCormick, the book is considered a classic in human factors and ergonomics, and one of the best-established texts in the field. It is frequently taught in upper-level and graduate courses in the U.S., and is relied on by practicing human factors and ergonomics professionals.

The text is divided into six sections: Introduction; Information Input; Human Output and Control; Work Space and Arrangement; Environment; and Human Factors: Selected Topics.

== See also ==
- Anthropometry
- Industrial and organizational psychology
- The History of Human Factors and Ergonomics
