= Women's WIRE =

Online space and Internet company

Women's WIRE (later Women.com) was the first online space and the first Internet company to target women. It was founded in California first as simply WIRE in 1992, an acronym that stood for Women's Information Resource & Exchange, and could be accessed via telnet for a subscription. Women's WIRE was conceived of by self-taught computer programmer, Nancy Rhine and then co-founded with entrepreneur, Ellen Pack. Later, Women's WIRE migrated to the World Wide Web and became known as Women.com. The site drew millions of visitors a month, with around 300,000 visitors per day. It provided users with email access, community functions such as chatrooms and forums, access to news, advice, and information. In the dot.com bubble of 1999, Women's WIRE began to suffer financial losses and was eventually acquired by iVillage in 2001.

== History ==
Nancy Rhine had imagined creating a women's space online in the early 1990s. Rhine and Pack met at the Whole Earth 'Lectronic Link (The WELL), where Rhine worked as the site's co-director. Pack's first experience going online had happened in 1991, and while she enjoyed the experience, Pack noticed that there was a lack of women's voices online. When Pack posted on The WELL about starting a network for women online, Rhine contacted her about her idea. Pack and Rhine worked together to develop and launch Women's WIRE in 1992. WIRE stood for Women's Information Resource & Exchange. Pack helped provide the funds of $100,000 she raised from family and friends, and Rhine, who was a self-taught computer expert, developed the site. They also involved a Silicon Valley consultant, Marleen McDaniel. When Rhine and Pack began the project, a male representative warned them against creating Women's WIRE, saying "there wasn't a market for women". Ignoring his advice, Women's WIRE became the first Internet company to target women, launching in October 1993 with 500 members.

At first the organization was only known as WIRE and had secured the address wire.net. However, Wired Magazine felt that this was too close to their name and the address they used which was wired.com. The two groups agreed to settle out of court with Wired agreeing to help pay half of migration costs to a new address and WIRE agreeing to change their name to Women's WIRE. Rhine said the decision to settle was based on money so that Women's WIRE could focus on growing their business.

At first, Women's WIRE was run out of Pack's home. At the time, it was the only "online service focused on women". Later, they moved to an office space in South San Francisco with an all-women staff. 1994, users, 90% of whom were women, paid $15 a month to access Women's WIRE. Also in 1994, Women's WIRE promoted McDaniel to the role of president of the organization where McDaniel helped transition the site to the Internet. As the Internet grew, Women's WIRE became Women.com in 1995. Women's WIRE migrated to a space on CompuServe and to the web address Women.com. They moved the offices from San Francisco to San Mateo. Rhine left the organization in 1996 to develop content for women at America Online.

It became a "one-stop Web portal where women could network" and more. By 1996, Women's WIRE employees created content that was seen by 300,000 visitors a month. The site was supported by advertising. In 2000, approximately 80% of the site's revenue came from advertising alone.

In 1997, Pack authored a book, Women's Wire Web Directory, to help women navigate online spaces and to get them involved in Women's WIRE. By 1999, they were supported by sponsors including Microsoft, Toyota, IBM, Hallmark and Bloomberg. Early in 1999, Women.com also took over HomeArts.com, part of Hearst Corporation.

In 1999, however, stock prices fell significantly in the dot-com crash, and Women.com was purchased by iVillage in 2001. The purchase deal, which included cash and stock, was worth $47 million and merged Women.com and iVillage. The merger itself created "the world's largest and most comprehensive destination for women on the web" at the time.

== Content ==
Women's WIRE was developed to "become an international communications network focused on women's issues." Content on the site changed frequently to keep readers interested. The site had "pleasing but spare graphics," according to Entertainment Weekly in 1996, and it loaded quickly. Sections of the site included questions from readers. Women's WIRE provided links to job listings also provided sources that could help women develop their careers and job hunting skills. The site was also known for having a sense of humor about the topics that it covered. As the 1996 Summer Olympic Games came up, Women's WIRE joined with Women's Sports + Fitness to provided coverage of the event and also included articles about fitness, training and sports. Women's WIRE, now known as Women.com, had continued to expand their range of content in 1999 in order to bring in more visitors to the site. Women.com had exclusive partnerships to display material from Hearst magazines. Women.com also added content from Harlequin Books to their site in 1999. Plans to allow users to purchase books direction from the publisher through Women.com were also underway. By 2000, there were over 100,000 pages of content provided by Women.com. They also offered newsletters and the ability for users to create their own homepage.

Additionally, Women's WIRE provided a sense of community to users. It was a place where women could share their concerns and find advice about their problems from other women. Resources relating to help for domestic abuse were also available. Women were able to mobilize politically through Women's WIRE, sharing information and encouraging women to call politicians. The site was more radical early on, reflecting the preferences of co-founder Nancy Rhine, who wanted to emphasize community and feminist principles.

== Technology ==
When Women's WIRE started, it was a subscriber-based online service with around 1,300 subscribers. Women's WIRE was initially run on software called First Class BBS. Women logged in either using a local number in San Francisco or used telnet. If users needed help connecting to Women's WIRE, they could receive support from their own customer service. In 1994, Rhine and co-founder Ellen Pack had to make a decision about moving to the World Wide Web. In October 1995, Women's WIRE switched over to CompuServe. Women's WIRE was now on version 2.6 and users could access the site using a diskette and CompuServe. Version 2.6 provided client access via CompuServe and a dial-up connection. Women using version 2.6 had access to email, chat rooms, newswires and more. In 1996, Women's WIRE moved away from a bulletin board service and encouraged subscribers to join a forum set up on CompuServe. Visitors could also go the web address Women.com to access content.

== See also ==
- Systers
