= Liuba Shrira =

Computer scientist

External videos
- ACID Objects and Modularity in the Cloud, Microsoft Research, 5 June 2012
- A New Approach to Old Storage, Google Tech Talks July 12, 2007

Liuba Shrira is a professor of computer science at Brandeis University, whose research interests primarily involve distributed systems. Shrira is accredited with having coined the phrase "promise" when referring to the completion (or failure) of an asynchronous operation and its resulting value for the JavaScript programming language

== Education ==
Shrira received her PhD from Technion.

== Career ==
She is affiliated with the MIT Computer Science and Artificial Intelligence Laboratory. Previously, she was a researcher in the MIT Programming Methodology Group (1986–1997), a visiting researcher at Microsoft Research (2004–2005), and a visiting professor at Technion (2010–2011).

Shrira was one of the founding members of the Systers mailing list for women in computing.

== Awards and honors ==
She is an ACM Distinguished Member and a member of the IEEE Computer Society.

== Selected publications ==
- Barbara Liskov; Sanjay Ghemawat; Robert Gruber; Paul Johnson; Liuba Shrira; Michael Williams (1991). "Replication in the Harp File System". 13th ACM Symposium on Operating Systems Principles.
- Rivka Ladin; Barbara Liskov; Liuba Shrira; Sanjay Ghemawat (1992). "Providing high availability using lazy replication". ACM Transactions on Computer Systems.
- Chandrasekhar Boyapati; Barbara Liskov; Liuba Shrira (2003). "Ownership Types for Object Encapsulation". ACM Symposium on Principles of Programming Languages.
