= Unoma Ndili Okorafor =

Nigerian computer scientist and entrepreneur

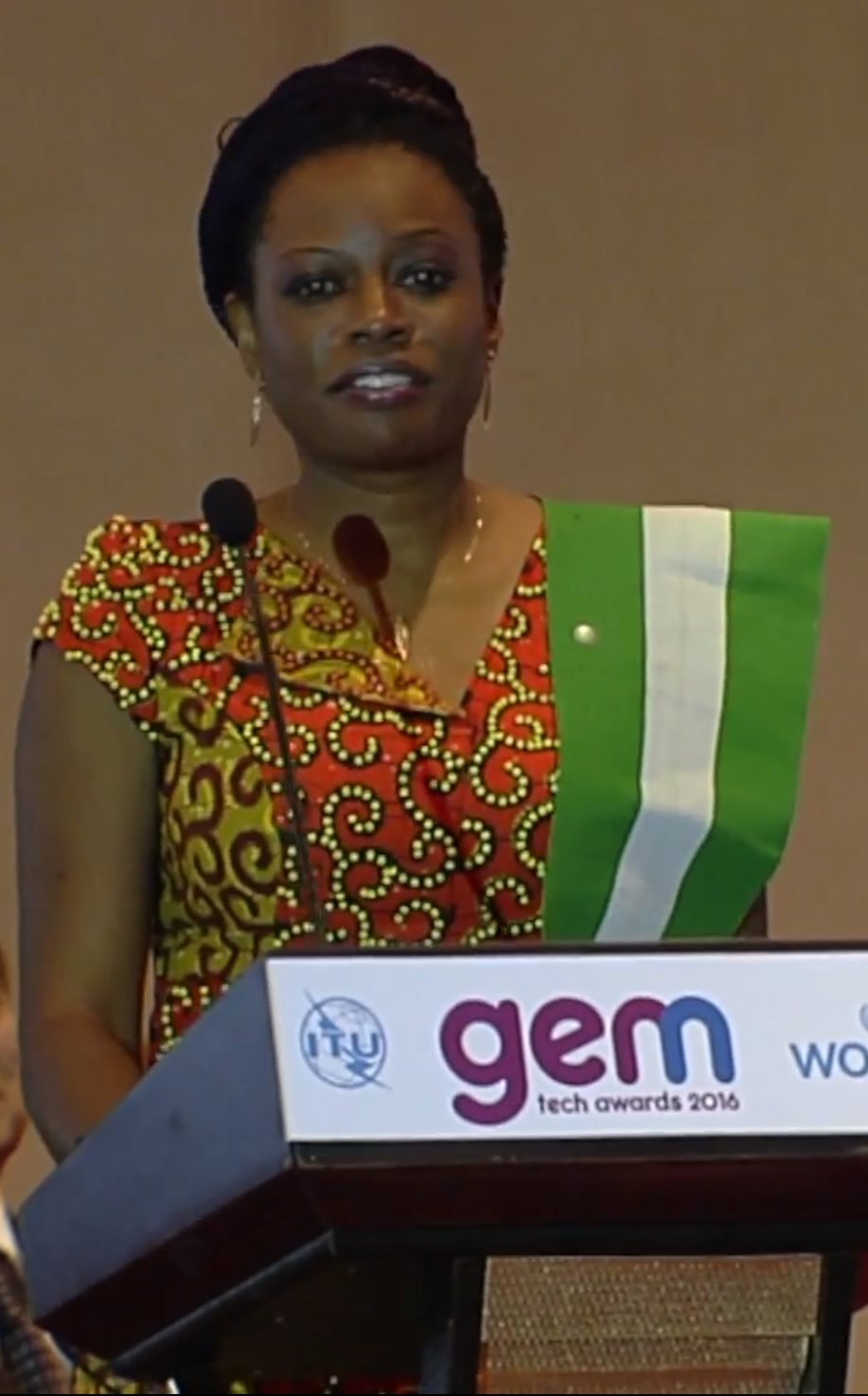
- Okorafor speaks at the Gem Tech Awards 2016
- Citizenship: Nigeria
- Education: University of Lagos Rice University Texas A&M University
- Known for: Founded Working to Advance African Women.
- Children: 3
- Awards: Anita Borg Social Change Agent Award; ITU and UN Women GEM Tech Award
- Scientific career
- Workplaces: Working to Advance African Women
- Thesis: Secure integrated routing and localization in wireless optical sensor networks (2008)
- Doctoral advisor: Deepa Kundur

Unoma Ndili Okorafor is a Nigerian computer scientist and entrepreneur. Okorafor founded Working to Advance African Women, a non-profit that supports the education of African women in science, technology, engineering, and math (STEM) in 2007. She is the chief executive officer at Herbal Goodness and Fairview Data Technologies.

== Early life and education ==
Okorafor was born in Nigeria. She is the fifth child of Frank Nwachukwu Ndili, the first Nigerian nuclear physicist and the 7th Vice-Chancellor (President) of the University of Nigeria, Nsukka.

She studied computer and electrical engineering at the University of Lagos, graduating in 2008. She moved to Texas for her graduate studies, earning a master's degree at Rice University in 2001 and a PhD from Texas A&M University in 2008. At Texas A&M University she was a Sloan Foundation Scholar. Her PhD, Secure Integrated Routing and Localization in Wireless Optical Sensor Networks, was supervised by Deepa Kundur. She then joined Stanford Graduate School of Business, where she completed an Executive Program in Social Entrepreneurship. She also completed the Social Entrepreneurship program at INSEAD.

== Career ==
Okorafor has worked at Texas Instruments, Intel, Hewlett-Packard and IBM. In 2007, whilst completing her PhD, Okorafor founded Working to Advance African Women (WAAW). WAAW is a 501(c) not-for-profit which promotes STEM education to African women. She launched the program with savings she made as a graduate student. WAAW runs 13 programs in Ghana, Kenya, Uganda, Cameroon, Malawi, Togo, Nigeria and South Africa. They have over one hundred volunteer university fellows and reach several thousand girls a year. Alongside educating young women, Okorafor works with communities and families to ensure that no one tries to stop girls choosing STEM subjects.

Okorafor is a visiting professor at the African University of Science and Technology, where she teaches courses on computer science. She is the chief executive officer at Herbal Goodness, Fairview Data Technologies, and Radicube Technologies.

=== Awards and honors ===
- 2018 - One of OkayAfrica's Top 100 Women in 2018
- 2016 - ITU and UN Women GEM Tech Award
- 2013 - Anita Borg Social Change Agent Award
- 2010 - Crans Montana Leaders Forum "Future World leader"

== Personal life ==
Okorafor married Ekpe Okorafor and has three children.
