= Vivienne Ming =

American theoretical neuroscientist

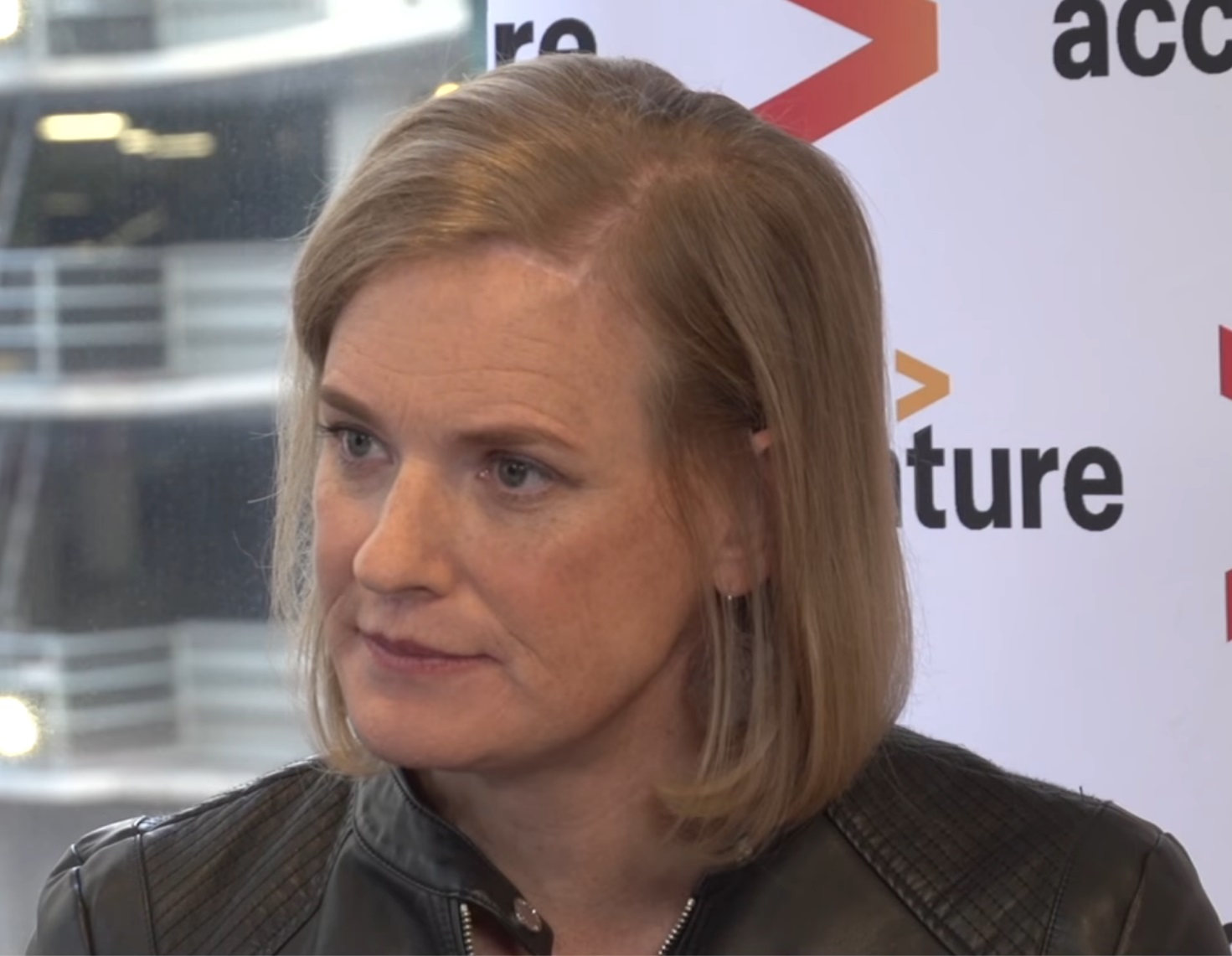
- Ming interviewed on SiliconAngle theCube in 2018
- Born: Evan Campbell Smith; October 19, 1971 (age 54)
- Education: University of California at San Diego (BS); Carnegie Mellon University (MS, PhD)
- Awards: 100 Women
- Scientific career
- Fields: Artificial intelligence Neuroscience
- Thesis: Efficient auditory coding (2006)

Vivienne L'Ecuyer Ming (born October 19, 1971) is an American theoretical neuroscientist and artificial intelligence expert. She was named as one of the BBC 100 Women in 2017, and as one of the Financial Times' "LGBT leaders and allies today".

== Early life and education ==
Ming has spoken extensively on her academic struggles early in life, which eventually led her to leave college. After struggling with depression, suicide, and homelessness, she returned ten years later and received her Bachelor of Science degree with honors in cognitive neuroscience from the University of California at San Diego in 2000. In 2016 she delivered the convocation at her alma mater. Ming earned her Master of Science degree in 2003 followed in 2006 by a PhD in Psychology at Carnegie Mellon University, in parallel with the computational neuroscience program at the Center for the Neural Basis of Cognition.

== Career and research ==
After earning her PhD, Ming held a joint postdoctoral fellowship at Stanford University and University of California, Berkeley, which she later joined as a research scientist and visiting scholar. Ming has been involved with various organizations that challenge poor education and health policy. She co-founded the think tank Socos, which consults on artificial intelligence, neuroscience and education reform. She has demonstrated that the metrics used in hiring have little influence on workplace success. She worked with Accenture on how they could train staff to be more creative.

Ming has published research on artificial intelligence in education and created "Muse", a machine learning based tool for parents that recommends research-based activities to support young people's creativity, motivation, and emotional intelligence. She has led research showing that psychological constructs such as metacognition, socio-emotional competence, creativity, and curiosity significantly affect long-term life-outcomes such as health, productivity, educational attainment, and life satisfaction.

== Awards and recognition ==
In May 2017, Ming delivered a TEDx Talk about how to make a better person. She has spoken about machine learning at Singularity University in Brazil. She spoke about artificial intelligence and neural networks at the Royal Irish Academy and the Royal Society in 2018. She has appeared on the PC Magazine podcast Fast Forward. She has been featured on BBC Radio 4 and NPR.

Ming was included in the BBC's "Top 100 Women 2017" and the Financial Times's “The OUTstanding lists: LGBT leaders and allies today", along with other awards and acknowledgments.
