= Systers =

Systers, founded by Anita Borg, is an international electronic mailing list for technical women in computing. The Syster community strives to increase the number of women in computer science and improve work environments for women. The mailing list has operated since 1987, making it the oldest of its kind for women in computer science. It is likely the largest email community of women in computing.

== History ==
Systers was formed by Anita Borg in 1987 after a discussion with women at the Symposium on Operating Systems Principles (SOSP) in Austin. At the conference, Borg got the email addresses of 20 of the women attending and created Systers. The administrator of Systers was Borg, who was called by users "her Systers' keeper". It was the first worldwide community for women working in the field of computer science. The group spread by word of mouth, growing to around 2,000 members in the mid 1990s. The group was accused of practicing "reverse discrimination" by others in 1993. Borg defended the group as a way for women who were often cut off from one another in the field to connect with one another. Many women did not have any other women in their own workplaces. It was refreshing to find a space where women were not "drowned out by the voices of men." The size of the group led Borg to create a system, called MECCA, which would allow members to opt in and out of various discussion topics. Later, the list would move to web-based technology. By 2004, women from 53 different countries were participating. Systers also influenced other similar mailing lists.

As of 2012, more than 3000 members were subscribing to the Systers' mailing list. Previously, the mailing list was maintained by Her Systers' Keeper, Robin Jeffries, from 2000 to 2012. The next Systers' Keeper was Rosario Robinson. During the Grace Hopper Celebration of Women in Computing (GHC) at Houston Texas in 2018, it was announced that Zaza Soriano will be the new Systers' Keeper.

=== Systers 25th Anniversary ===
In 2012, Systers celebrated its 25th anniversary with Global Meet Ups and a celebration at the Grace Hopper Celebration of Women in Computing.

== About ==
Systers was developed as an electronic mailing list for women working in computer science. It is one of the oldest communities for women in computer science. Women using the list must stay on topic (discussion women and computer science) and they are expected to treat each other with respect. Members are expected to be supportive of other members and topics discussed generally relate to women in computing. A notable exception was a 1992 discussion of a Barbie doll, whose recorded phrases included "Math class is tough!" Systers was credited as influential in persuading Mattel to remove the phrase. Other topics which have been covered included strategies for childcare on the job or at conferences, dealing with harassment both online and at work and technical questions. Women were able to ask questions about various topics and receive timely answers from their peers. Women also shared jokes about working in the computing or engineering fields. Other lists which have "spun off" from Systers are researcHers, system-entrepreneurs and a list for recent doctoral graduates.

The Systers list runs on GNU Mailman. Systers members and Google Summer of Code participants customized the code to meet Systers' needs.

=== Anita Borg Systers Pass-It-On Awards Program ===
The Pass-It-On Awards program provides monetary support for women entering fields in technology through donations by women established in technological fields. The award honor's Anita Borg's vision of a network of women who support each other. Awards from $500.00 to $1000.00 USD are funded by online donations from the Systers community.

== Founding members ==
Systers was founded in 1987 by Anita Borg and several other women who attended a Symposium on Operating Systems Principles (SOSP) conference.

- Anita Borg
- Stella Atkins
- Miche Baker-Harvey
- Carla Ellis
- Joan Francioni
- Susan Gerhart
- Anita K. Jones
- Rivka Ladin
- Barbara Liskov
- Sherri Menees Nichols
- Susan Owicki
- Liuba Shrira
- Karen Sollins

== See also ==
- Women's WIRE
