= Women in STEM =

Female participants in technical fields

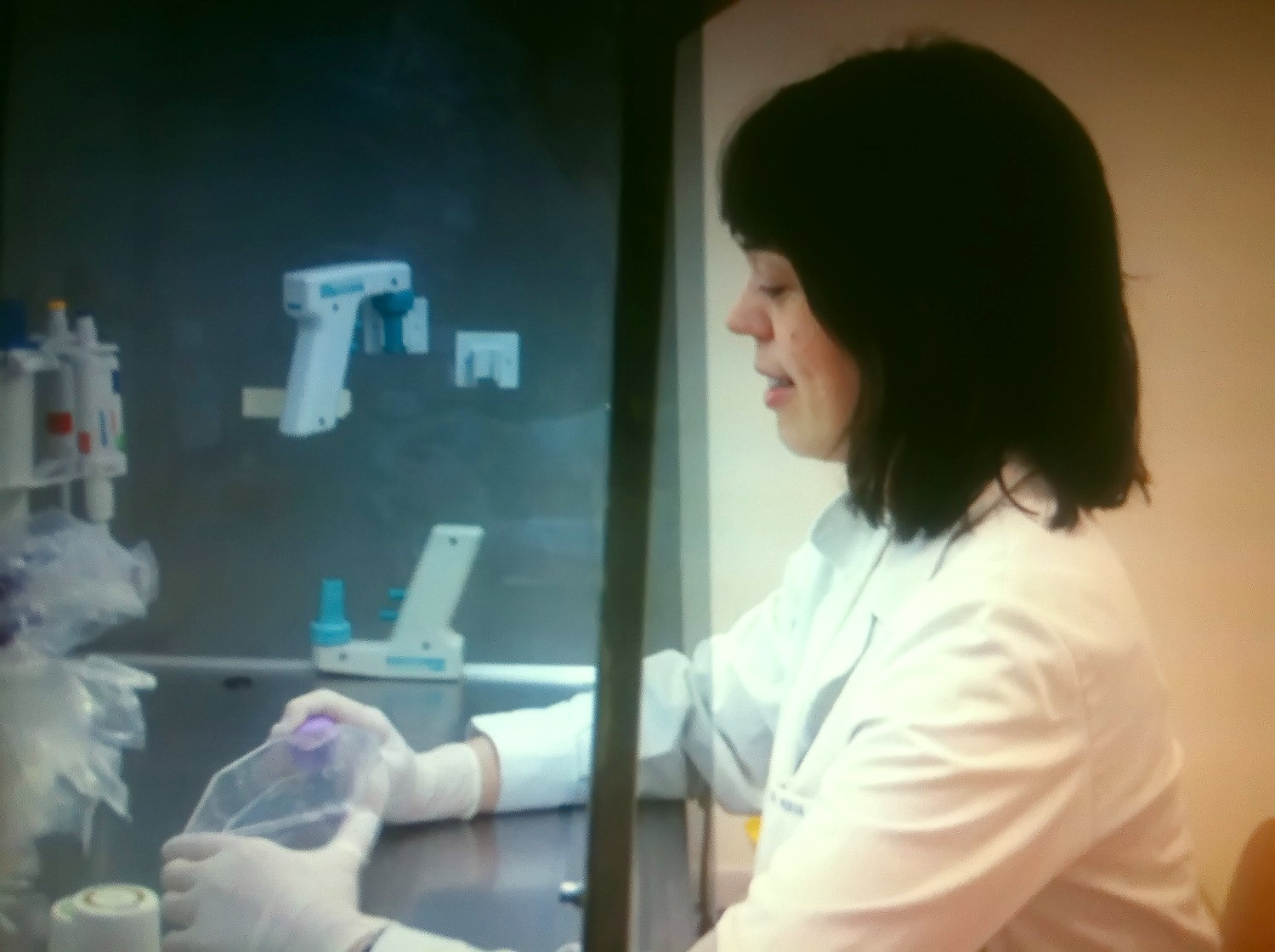
Biochemist Ainhoa Murua Ugarte at work in her lab

Many scholars and policymakers have noted that the fields of science, technology, engineering, and mathematics (STEM) have remained predominantly male with historically low participation among women since the origins of these fields in the 18th century during the Age of Enlightenment.

Scholars are exploring the various reasons for the continued existence of this gender disparity in STEM fields. Those who view this disparity as resulting from discriminatory forces are also seeking ways to redress this disparity within STEM fields. STEM professions are typically construed as well-compensated, high-status professions with universal career appeal.

== History ==
Women's participation in science, technology, and engineering has been limited and also under-reported throughout most of history. This has been the case, with exceptions, until large-scale changes began around the 1970s. Scholars have discussed possible reasons and mechanisms behind the limitations such as ingrained gender roles, sexism, and sex differences in psychology. There has also been an effort among historians of science to uncover under-reported contributions of women. The "Computer Women" at NASA during the 1950s and 1960s were a group of women known as "computers" who performed essential calculations for aeronautical and space research. They worked as mathematicians, engineers, and analysts, laying the groundwork for early space exploration, even though their contributions were often overlooked.

The term STEM was first used in 2001, primarily in connection with the choice of education and career. Different STEM fields have different histories, but women's participation, although limited, has been seen throughout history. Science, protoscience and mathematics have been practiced since ancient times, and during this time women have contributed to fields such as medicine, botany, astronomy, algebra, and geometry. In the Middle Ages in Europe and the Middle East, Christian monasteries and Islamic madrasas were places where women could work on such subjects as mathematics and the study of nature. Ada Lovelace, an English mathematician, is often credited as the world's first computer programmer. In the mid-1800s, she worked on Charles Babbage's proposed mechanical computer, the Analytical Engine. She created an algorithm intended to be processed by the machine, making her a pioneer in the field of computer science.

Universities in the Christian tradition began as places of education for a professional clergy that allowed no women, and the practice of barring women continued even after universities' missions broadened. Because women were generally barred from formal higher education until late in the 19th century, it was very difficult for them to enter specialized disciplines.

The development of industrial technology was dominated by men, and early technical achievements, such as the invention of the steam engine, were mainly due to men. Nevertheless, there are many examples of women's contributions to engineering.

Initially, a "computer" was a person who performed computations, who was often a woman. Working as a computer required conscientiousness, accuracy and speed. Some women who initially worked as human computers later advanced from doing simpler calculations to higher levels of work, where they specified tasks and algorithms and analyzed results.

Women's participation rates in the STEM fields started increasing noticeably in the 1970s and 1980s. Some fields, such as biotechnology, now have almost 50% participation of women.

== Gender imbalance in STEM fields ==
According to PISA 2015 results, 4.8% of boys and 0.4% of girls expect an ICT career.

Studies suggest that many factors contribute to attitudes toward achievement in mathematics and science among young people, including encouragement from parents, interactions with mathematics and science teachers, curriculum content, hands-on laboratory experiences, high school achievement in mathematics and science, and resources available at home. In the United States, research findings are mixed concerning when boys' and girls' attitudes about mathematics and science diverge. Analyzing several nationally representative longitudinal studies, one researcher found few differences in girls' and boys' attitudes toward science in the early secondary school years. Students' aspirations to pursue careers in mathematics and science influence both the courses they choose to take in those areas and the level of effort they put forth in these courses.

A 1996 U.S. study suggested that girls begin to lose self-confidence in middle school because they believe that men possess more intelligence in technological fields. The fact that men outperform women in some measures of spatial ability, a skill set many engineering professionals deem vital, generates this misconception. Feminist scholars postulate that boys are more likely to gain spatial skills outside the classroom because they are culturally and socially encouraged to build and work with their hands. Research shows that girls can develop these same skills with the same form of training.

A 1996 U.S. study of college freshmen by the Higher Education Research Institute shows that men and women differ greatly in their intended fields of study. Of first-time college freshmen in 1996, 20 percent of men and 4 percent of women planned to major in computer science and engineering, while similar percentages of men and women planned to major in biology or physical sciences. The differences in the intended majors between male and female first-time freshmen directly relate to the differences in the fields in which men and women earn their degrees. At the post-secondary level, women are less likely than men to earn a degree in mathematics, physical sciences, or computer sciences and engineering. An exception to this gender imbalance is seen in the field of life science.

=== Effects of under-representation of women in STEM careers ===
In Scotland, a large number of women graduate in STEM subjects but are less likely than men to pursue a STEM career. The Royal Society of Edinburgh estimates that doubling women's high-skill contributions to Scotland's economy would benefit it by £170 million per annum.

A 2017 study found that closing the gender gap in STEM education would have a positive impact on economic growth in the EU, contributing to an increase in GDP per capita of 0.7–0.9% across the bloc by 2030 and of 2.2–3.0% by 2050.

=== Men's and women's earnings ===
Female college graduates earned less on average than male college graduates, even though they shared the earnings growth of all college graduates in the 1980s. Some of the salary differences are related to the differences in occupations entered by women and men. Among recent science and engineering bachelor's degree recipients, women were less likely than men to be employed in science and engineering occupations. There remains a wage gap between men and women in comparable scientific positions. Among more experienced scientists and engineers, the gender gap in salaries is greater than for recent graduates. Salaries are highest in mathematics, computer science, and engineering, which are fields in which women are not highly represented. In Australia, a study conducted by the Australian Bureau of Statistics has shown that the current gender wage gap between men and women in STEM fields in Australia stands at 30.1 percent as of 2013, which is an increase of 3 percent since 2012. In addition, according to a study done by Moss, when faculty members of top research institutions in America were asked to recruit student applicants for a laboratory manager position, both men and women faculty members rated the male applicants as more hireable and competent for the position, as opposed to the female applicants who shared an identical resume with the male applicants. Faculty members were willing to give the male applicants a higher starting salary and career mentoring opportunities.

=== Education and perception ===
The percentage of Ph.D.s in STEM fields in the U.S. earned by women is about 42%, whereas the percentage of Ph.D. in all fields earned by women is about 52%. Stereotypes and educational differences can lead to the underrepresentation of women in STEM fields. These educational disparities begin as early as the third grade according to Thomas Dee, with boys advancing in math and science and girls advancing in reading. According to UNESCO, as of 2023, 122 million girls worldwide are out of school, and women still account for nearly two-thirds of all adults who cannot read.

== Representation of women worldwide ==
Percentage of students who are female in (a) engineering, manufacturing and construction and (b) information and communication technology programmes in tertiary education, 2017 or latest year

UNESCO, among other agencies including the European Commission and The Association of Academies and Societies of Sciences in Asia (AASSA), has been outspoken about the underrepresentation of women in STEM fields globally.

Despite their efforts to compile and interpret comparative statistics, it is necessary to exercise caution. Ann Hibner Koblitz has commented on the obstacles to making meaningful statistical comparisons between countries:

For a variety of reasons, it is difficult to obtain reliable data on international comparisons of women in STEM fields. Aggregate figures do not tell us much, especially since terminology describing educational levels, content of majors, job categories, and other markers varies from country to country.

Even when different countries use the same definitions of terms, the social significance of the categories may differ considerably. Koblitz remarks:

It is not possible to use the same indicators to determine the situation in every country. The significant statistic might be the percentage of women teaching at the university level. But it might also be the proportion of women at research institutes and academies of sciences (and at what level), or the percentage of women who publish (or who publish in foreign as opposed to domestic journals), or the proportion of women who go abroad for conferences, postgraduate study, and so on, or the percentage of women awarded grants by national and international funding agencies. Indices can have different meanings in different countries, and the prestige of various positions and honors can vary considerably.

=== Africa ===
According to UNESCO statistics, 30% of the Sub-Saharan tech workforce are women; this share rose to 33.5 percent in 2018. South Africa features among the top 20 countries in the world for the share of professionals with skills in artificial intelligence and machine learning, with women representing 28 percent of these South African professionals.

=== Asia ===
Proportion of female graduates in science programmes in tertiary education in Asia

A fact sheet published by UNESCO in March 2015 presented worldwide statistics of women in the STEM fields, with a focus on Asia and the Pacific region. It reports that, worldwide, 30 percent of researchers are women; as of 2018, this share had increased to 33 percent. In these areas, East Asia, the Pacific, South Asia and West Asia had the most uneven balance, with 20 percent of researchers being women in each of those sub-regions. Meanwhile, Central Asia had the most equal balance in the region, with women comprising 46 percent of its researchers. The Central Asian countries Azerbaijan and Kazakhstan were the only countries in Asia with women as the majority of their researchers, though in both cases it was by a very small margin.

| Countries | Percentage of researchers who are female |
|---|---|
| Central Asia | 46% |
| World | 30% |
| South and West Asia | 20% |
| East Asia and the Pacific | 20% |

==== Cambodia ====
As at 2004, 13.9% of students enrolled in science programs in Cambodia were female and 21% of researchers in science, technology, and innovation fields were female as of 2002. These statistics are significantly lower than those of other Asian countries such as Malaysia, Mongolia, and South Korea. According to a UNESCO report on women in STEM in Asian countries, Cambodia's education system has a long history of male dominance stemming from its male-only Buddhist teaching practices. Starting in 1924, girls were allowed to enroll in school. Bias against women, not only in education but in other aspects of life as well, exists in the form of traditional views of men as more powerful and dignified than women, especially in the home and in the workplace, according to UNESCO's A Complex Formula.

==== Indonesia ====
UNESCO's A Complex Formula states that Indonesia's government has been working towards gender equality, especially through the Ministry of Education and Culture, but stereotypes about women's roles in the workplace persist. Due to traditional views and societal norms, women struggle to remain in their careers or to move up in the workplace. Substantially more women are enrolled in science-based fields such as pharmacy and biology than in mathematics and physics. Within engineering, statistics vary based on the specific engineering discipline; women make up 78% of chemical engineering students but only 5% of mechanical engineering students. As of 2005, out of 35,564 researchers in science, technology, and engineering, only 10,874 or 31% were female.

==== Japan ====
According to OECD data, about 25 percent of enrollment in science programs at the tertiary education level in Japan are women. Japan has the lowest share of women in tertiary teaching staff among OECD countries, with only 28% of female faculty members, far below the OECD average of 44%. Women make up just 17.7% of teaching staff at national universities, with only 10.8% in science and engineering fields and 9.4% in executive positions. Additionally, female enrollment in natural sciences, mathematics, and statistics stands at 27% (OECD average: 52%), while in engineering, manufacturing, and construction, it is just 16% (OECD average: 26%)."

==== Kazakhstan ====
According to OECD data, about 66 percent of enrollment in science programs at the tertiary education level in Kazakhstan are women. Despite strong enrollment rates, women in Kazakhstan remain underrepresented in STEM leadership roles. The government, along with international organizations, has introduced mentorship programs, scholarships, and leadership training to encourage more women to enter and stay in STEM careers. These initiatives aim to close the gender gap and promote inclusivity in high-tech industries.

==== Malaysia ====
According to UNESCO, 48.19% of students enrolled in science programs in Malaysia were female as of 2011. This number has grown significantly in the past three decades, during which the country's employment of women has increased by 95%. In Malaysia, over 50% of employees in the computer industry, which is generally a male-dominated field within STEM, are women. Of students enrolled in pharmacy, more than 70% are female, while in engineering only 36% of students are female. Women held 49% of research positions in science, technology, and innovation as of 2011.

==== Mongolia ====
According to UNESCO's data from 2012 and 2018 respectively, 40.2% of students enrolled in science programs and 49% of researchers in science, technology, and innovation in Mongolia are female. Traditionally, nomadic Mongol culture was fairly egalitarian, with both women and men raising children, tending livestock, and fighting in battle, which mirrors the relative equality of women and men in Mongolia's modern-day workforce. More females than males pursue higher education and 65% of college graduates in Mongolia are women. However, women earn about 19–30% less than their male counterparts and are perceived by society to be less suited to engineering than men. Thirty percent or less of employees in computer science, construction architecture, and engineering are female while three in four biology students are female.

==== Nepal ====
As of 2011, 26.17% of Nepal's science students were women and 19% of their engineering students were also women. In research, women held 7.8% of positions in 2010. These low percentages correspond with Nepal's patriarchal societal values. In Nepal, women that enter STEM fields most often enter forestry or medicine, specifically nursing, which is perceived as a predominantly female occupation in most countries.

==== South Korea ====
In 2012, 30.63% of students who enrolled in science programs in South Korea were female, a number that has been increasing since the digital revolution. Numbers of male and female students enrolled at most levels of education are comparable as well, though the gender difference is larger in higher education. Confucian beliefs in the lower societal value of women as well as other cultural factors could influence South Korea's STEM gender gap. In South Korea, as in other countries, the percentage of women in medicine (61.6%) is much higher than the percentage of women in engineering (15.4%) and other more math-based stem fields. In research occupations in science, technology, and innovation, women made up 17% of the workforce as of 2011. In South Korea, most women working in STEM fields are classified as "non-regular" or temporary employees, indicating poor job stability. In a study conducted by the University of Glasgow which examined math anxiety and test performance of boys and girls from various countries, researchers found that South Korea had a high sex difference in mathematics scores, with female students scoring significantly lower than and experiencing more math anxiety on math tests than male students.

==== Thailand ====
According to OECD data, about 53 percent of enrollment in science programs at the tertiary education level in Thailand are women.

===== India =====
In India, technical universities have begun forming programs to support female students. For instance, the Indian Institute of Technology Delhi (IIT Delhi) runs the Initiative for Gender Equity and Sensitisation (IGES), which organizes mentorship panels and provides mental health resources for women in science and engineering.

==== Gulf Cooperation Council States ====
Ann Hibner Koblitz reported on a series of interviews conducted in 2015 in Abu Dhabi with women engineers and computer scientists who had come to the United Arab Emirates and other Gulf states to find opportunities that were not available to them in their home country. The women spoke of a remarkably high level of job satisfaction and relatively little discrimination. Koblitz comments that

...most people in most countries outside of the Middle East have no idea that the region, in particular the UAE, is a magnet for young, dynamic Arab women making successful careers for themselves in a variety of high-tech and other scientific fields; "land of opportunity," "a tech-person's paradise," and yes, even "mecca" were among the terms used to describe the UAE by the women I met.

=== Central and South America ===
Nearly half of PhD degrees pursued in Central and South America are completed by women (2018). However, only a small minority is represented at decision-making levels.

A 2018 study gathered 6,849 articles published in Latin America and found that women researchers were 31% of published researchers in 2018, an increase from 27% in 2002. The same study also found that when women lead the research group, women contributors were published 60%, compared to when men are the leaders and the women contributors were published 20%.

When looking at over 1,500 articles related to Botany published in Latin America, a study found that participation from both women and men were equal, whether it be in publications or leading roles in scientific organizations. Also women had higher rates of publication in Argentina, Brazil, and Mexico when compared to other Latin American countries despite participation being nearly the same throughout the region. Although women have higher publications in Botany, men still out publish women and are often the ones cited in research papers and studies relating to the sciences.

Total Enrollment in STEM per Area of Study in Chile
| | 2015 | | 2016 | | Change in Percent | |
| Area of Study | Men | Women | Men | Women | Men | Women |
|---|---|---|---|---|---|---|
| Social Sciences | 30.7% | 69.3% | 29.9% | 70.1% | -0.8% | +0.8% |
| Education | 30.2% | 69.8% | 27.4% | 72.6% | -2.8% | +2.8% |
| Health | 30.4% | 69.6% | 23.8% | 76.2% | -6.6% | +6.6% |
| Technology | 81.8% | 18.2% | 78.2% | 21.8% | -3.6% | +3.6% |

The study concluded that according to the data (shown in the table above), women in Chile that are enrolled in STEM have higher enrollment in the sciences closely related to Biology and Medicine than other sciences in the technological field. After graduation women made up 67.70% of the workers in Engineering in Health and 59.80% of workers in Biomedical Engineering. While in other fields, such as Mechanical Engineering or Electrical Engineering (the more technical fields), men dominated the workforce with over 90% of workers being male.

=== Europe ===
Percentage of women graduates in ICT tertiary education programmes

Share of women employed as ICT specialists

Share of women employed in the ICT sector, divided according to qualification level

(EU, 2016)

In the European Union only 16.7% on average of ICT (Information and communication technology) specialists are women. Estonia, Romania, Bulgaria, and Latvia each around ~27–28 %, making them among the top performers for female ICT specialists. The gender distribution is more balanced, particularly in new member states when taking into account ICT technicians (middle and low-ranking positions).

In 2012, the percentage of women PhD graduates was 47.3% of the total, 51% of the social sciences, business and law, 42% of the science, mathematics and computing, and just the 28% of PhD graduates in engineering, manufacturing and construction. In the computing subfield only 21% of PhD graduates were women. In 2013 in the EU as an average men scientists and engineers made up 4.1% of total labour force, while women made up only 2.8%. In more than half of the countries women make up less than 45% of scientists and engineers. The situation has improved, as between 2008 and 2011 the number of women amongst employed scientists and engineers grew by an average of 11.1% per year, while the number of men grew only by 3.3% over the same period.

In 2015, in Slovenia, Portugal, France, Sweden, Norway, and Italy there were more boys than girls taking advanced courses in mathematics and physics in secondary education in Grade 12.

In 2018, European Commissioner for Digital Economy and Society Mariya Gabriel announced plans to increase the participation of women in the digital sector by challenging stereotypes; promoting digital skills and education and advocating for more women entrepreneurs. In 2018, Ireland took the step of linking research funding from the Higher Education Authority to an institution's ability to reduce gender inequality.

=== North America ===
==== United States ====
According to the National Science Foundation, women comprise 43 percent of the U.S. workforce for scientists and engineers (S&E) under 75 years old. For those under 29 years old, women comprise 56% of the science and engineering workforce. Of scientists and engineers seeking employment, 50% under 75 are women, and 49% under 29 are women. About one in seven engineers are female. However, women comprise 28% of workers in S&E occupations - not all women who are trained as S&E are employed as scientists or engineers. Women hold 58% of S&E related occupations.

Women in STEM fields earn considerably less than men, even after controlling for a wide set of characteristics such as education and age. On average, men in STEM jobs earn $36.34 per hour while women in STEM jobs earn $31.11 per hour.

There are many reasons why gender pay gaps in STEM fields continue to exist which include women choosing STEM majors that pay less. However, even with the same degree, women still earned less. A research study on starting pay with an engineering degree found that women earned less than $61,000 while men earned more than $65,000.

Percentage distribution of total college graduates aged 25–34 in the U.S. (2019). Fields are defined by NCES.
| Bachelor's degree field | Men (%) | Women (%) |
|---|---|---|
| Computer and information sciences | 6.8 | 2.0 |
| Engineering/ engineering technologies | 14.8 | 3.7 |
| Biology/ biomedical sciences | 6.0 | 6.7 |
| Mathematics/statistics | 1.7 | 1.0 |
| Physical sciences | 3.5 | 2.3 |
| STEM total | 32.8 | 15.7 |
| Business | 21.7 | 15.5 |
| Education | 3.0 | 9.8 |
| Health Studies | 3.5 | 12.4 |
| Humanities | 9.6 | 12.4 |
| Social sciences, psychology, and history | 13.5 | 16.1 |
| All other fields of study | 15.9 | 18.0 |
| Non-STEM total | 67.2 | 84.3 |
| Total graduates (%) | 33.0 | 41.1 |

Women dominate the total number of persons with bachelor's degrees, as well as those in STEM fields defined by the National Center for Education Statistics. However, they are underrepresented in specific fields including Computer Sciences, Engineering, and Mathematics. Along with women, racial/ethnic minorities in the United States are also underrepresented in STEM.

Asian women are well represented in STEM fields in the U.S.(though not as much as males of the same ethnicity) compared to African American, Hispanic, Pacific Islander, and Native American women. Within academia, these minority women represent less than 1% of tenure-track positions in the top 100 U.S. universities despite constituting approximately 13% of total US population. A 2015 study suggested that attitudes towards hiring women in STEM tenure track positions has improved, with a 2:1 preference for women in STEM after adjusting for equal qualifications and lifestyles (e.g., single, married, divorced).

Ratio of number of actual to expected graduates if there were no imbalances due to gender/race ages 25–34 in the U.S. (2014). Fields defined by NCES.
| | Total | | STEM | |
| Race/ethnicity | Men | Women | Men | Women |
|---|---|---|---|---|
| White | 1.05 | 1.32 | 1.05 | 1.15 |
| Black | 0.49 | 0.73 | 0.44 | 0.68 |
| Hispanic | 0.37 | 0.54 | 0.37 | 0.48 |
| Asian | 1.85 | 1.94 | 3.12 | 2.61 |
| Pacific Islander | 0.32 | 0.44 | 0.38 | 0.52 |
| American Indian/Alaska Native | 0.32 | 0.46 | 0.27 | 0.44 |
| Other race | 1.00 | 1.35 | 1.22 | 1.33 |
| Two or more races | 0.97 | 1.15 | 1.11 | 1.19 |

==== African American women ====
According to Kimberly Jackson, prejudice and assumed stereotypes keep women of color, especially black women from studying in STEM fields. Psychologically, stereotypes on black women's intellect, cognitive abilities, and work ethic contribute to their lack of confidence in STEM. Some schools, such as Spelman College, have made attempts to change perceptions of African-American women and improve their rates of becoming involved and technically proficient in STEM. Students of color, especially Black students, face difficulty in STEM majors as they face hostile climates, microaggressions, and a lack of support and mentorship.

Despite facing discrimination, many African American women have risen to prominence in STEM fields, starting in the mid-1800s, when physician Rebecca Lee Crumpler was the first African American woman to earn a medical degree. In our day major scientific advances have been made by African American women such as Dr. Kizzmekia Corbett, who contributed to developing COVID-19 vaccines; Dr. Ayanna Howard, a leader in robotics and artificial intelligence; and Dr. Hadiyah-Nicole Green, a physicist known for her work in cancer treatments using lasers. Several organizations have worked to help African American women obtain the support needed to be successful in STEM; some of them include Sisters in STEM, Black Girls Do Stem, STEMNoire, and BWIStem.

==== Latin American women ====
A 2015 NCWIT study estimated that Latin American women represented only 1% of the US tech workforce. A 2018 study on 50 Latin American women who founded a technology company indicated that 20% were Mexican, 14% bi-racial, 8% unknown, 4% Venezuelan.

==== Canada ====
A Statistics Canada study from 2019 found that first-year women make up 44% of STEM students, compared with 64% of non-STEM students. Those women who transfer out of STEM courses usually go to a related field, such as health care or finance. A study conducted by the University of British Columbia discovered that only 20–25% of computer science students from all Canadian colleges and universities are women. As well, only about 1 in 5 of that percentage will graduate from those programs.

Statistically, women are less likely to choose a STEM program, regardless of mathematical ability. Young men with lower marks in mathematics are more likely to pursue STEM fields than their women-identified peers with higher marks in mathematics.

=== Oceania ===
==== Australia ====
Australia has only recently made significant attempts to promote participation of women in STEMM disciplines, including the formation of Women in STEMM Australia in 2014, a non-profit organisation that aims at connecting women in STEMM disciplines in a coherent network. Similarly, the STEM Women directory has been established to promote gender equity by showcasing the diversity of talent in Australian women in STEM fields. In 2015, the SAGE (Science in Australia Gender Equity) was started as a joint venture of the Australian Academy of Science and the Australian Academy of Technology and Engineering. The program is tasked with implementing a pilot of the Athena SWAN accreditation framework within Australian higher education institutions.

== Underrepresentation in STEM-related awards and competitions ==
In terms of the most prestigious awards in STEM fields, fewer have been awarded to women than to men. Between 1901 and 2017 the female:total ratio of Nobel Prizes were 2:207 for physics, 4:178 for chemistry, 12:214 for physiology/medicine, and 1:79 for economic sciences. The ratios for other fields were 14:114 in literature and 16:104 for peace. Maryam Mirzakhani was the first woman and first Iranian to receive the Fields Medal in 2014. The Fields Medal is one of the most prestigious prizes in mathematics, and has been awarded 56 times in total.

Fewer female students participate in prestigious STEM-related competitions such as the International Mathematical Olympiad. In 2017, only 10% of the IMO participants were female and there was one female on the South Korean winning team of six.

== Recent advances in technology ==
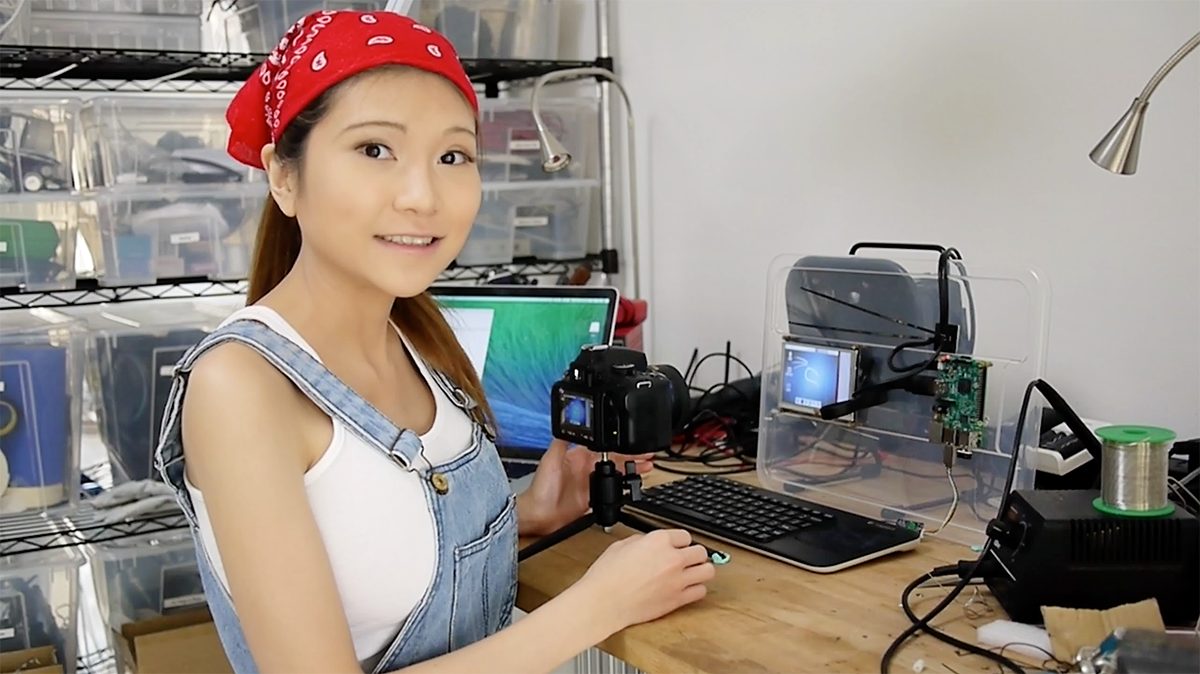
Naomi Wu demonstrating how to configure a Raspberry Pi 2

Abbiss states that "the ubiquity of computers in everyday life has seen the breaking down of gender distinctions in preferences for and the use of different applications, particularly in the use of the internet and email." Both genders have acquired skills, competencies and confidence in using a variety of technological, mobile and application tools for personal, educational and professional use at high school level, but the gap still remains when it comes to enrollment of girls in computer science classes, which declines from grades 10 to 12. For higher education programs in information and communications technology, women make up only 3% of graduates globally.

A review of UK patent applications, in 2016, found that the proportion of new inventions registered by women was rising, but that most female inventors were active in stereotypically female fields such as "designing bras and make-up". 94% of inventions in the field of computing, 96% in automotive applications and mining, and 99% in explosives and munitions, were by men. In 2016 Russia had the highest percentage of patents filed by women, at about 16%. Then in 2019, the USPTO issued a report showing that the share of female inventors listed on US patents had recently risen to about 17%.

== Explanations for low representation of women ==
There are a variety of proposed reasons for the relatively low numbers of women in STEM fields. These can be broadly classified into societal, psychological, and innate explanations. However, explanations are not necessarily restricted to just one of these categories.

=== Societal ===
==== Discrimination ====
This gap in representation may be due to discrimination, both overt and covert, faced by women in STEM fields. According to Londa Schiebinger, women are twice as likely to leave jobs in science and engineering as men. In the 1980s, researchers demonstrated a general evaluative bias against women.

In a 2012 study, email requests were sent to meet to professors in doctoral programs at the top 260 U.S. universities. It was impossible to determine whether any particular individual in this study was exhibiting discrimination, since each participant only viewed a request from one potential graduate student. However, researchers found evidence for collective discrimination against ethnic minorities and women relative to Caucasian men. In another study, science faculty were sent the materials of students who were applying for a lab manager position at their university. The materials were the same for each participant, but each application was randomly assigned either a male or a female name. The researchers found that faculty members rated the male candidates as both more competent and more hirable than the female candidates, despite applications being otherwise identical. If individuals are given information about a prospective student's gender, they may infer that he or she possesses traits consistent with stereotypes for that gender. A study in 2014 found that men are favored in some domains, such as tenure rates in biology, but that the majority of domains were gender-neutral. The authors interpreted this to suggest that the underrepresentation of women in the professorial ranks was not solely caused by sexist hiring, promotion, and remuneration. However, a decade later, many of the same issues were still being observed: A 2025 literature review conducted by the Society of Women Engineers found that "gender inequities remain at all levels of education and practice" worldwide in science, technology, engineering, and mathematics.

Audery Azoulay, UNESCO Chief, stated that even in the "21st century, women and girls are sidelined in science-related fields due to their gender." A 2017 survey showed that women working in the STEM fields are more likely to experience workplace discrimination than men. Around half of the women in STEM professions say they have experienced gender-based discrimination, such as pay disparity, being belittled about their credentials, or mocked or insulted. Some women also stated that in a workplace where most employees were male, they felt that being a woman was a barrier to their success.

==== Stereotypes ====
Stereotypes about what someone in a STEM field should look and act like may cause established members of these fields to overlook individuals who are highly competent. The stereotypical scientist or individual in another STEM profession is usually thought to be male. Women in STEM fields may not fit individuals' conception of what a scientist, engineer, or mathematician "should" look like and may thus be overlooked or penalized. The Role Congruity Theory of Prejudice states that perceived incongruity between gender and a particular role or occupation can result in negative evaluations. In addition, negative stereotypes about women's quantitative abilities may lead people to devalue their work or discourage these women from continuing in STEM fields.

Both men and women who work in "nontraditional" occupations may encounter discrimination, but the forms and consequences of this discrimination are different. Individuals of a particular gender are often perceived to be better suited to particular careers or areas of study than those of the other gender. A study found that job advertisements for male-dominated careers tended to use more agentic words (or words denoting agency, such as "leader" and "goal-oriented") associated with male stereotypes. Social Role Theory, proposed in 1991, states that men are expected to display agentic qualities and women to display communal qualities. These expectations can influence hiring decisions. A 2009 study found that women tended to be described in more communal terms and men in more agentic terms in letters of recommendation. These researchers also found that communal characteristics were negatively related to hiring decisions in academia.

Although men in female-dominated occupations may contend with negative stereotypes about their masculinity, they may also experience certain benefits. In 1992 it was suggested that women in male-dominated occupations tended to hit a glass ceiling; while men in female-dominated occupations may hit a "glass escalator".

==== Black Sheep effect ====
The Black Sheep effect occurs when individuals are likely to evaluate highly qualified members of their in-group more favorably than comparable members of their out-group. However, when an individual's in-group members have average or below average qualities, they are likely to evaluate them much lower than out-group members with equivalent qualifications. This suggests that established women in STEM fields will be more likely than established men to help early career women who display sufficient qualifications. However, established women will be less likely than men to help early career women who display insufficient qualifications.

==== Queen Bee effect ====
The Queen Bee effect is similar to the Black Sheep effect but applies only to women. It explains why higher-status women, particularly in male-dominated professions, may actually be less likely to help other women than their male colleagues. A 2004 study found that while doctoral students across disciplines did not exhibit any gender differences in work commitment or work satisfaction, faculty members at the same university believed that female students were less committed to their work than male students. What was particularly surprising was that these beliefs by faculty members were most strongly endorsed by female faculty members, rather than male faculty members. One potential explanation for this finding is that individual mobility for a member of a negatively stereotyped group is often accompanied by a social and psychological distancing of oneself from the group. This implies that successful women in traditionally male-dominated careers do not see their success as evidence that negative stereotypes about women's quantitative and analytical abilities are wrong, but rather as proof that they personally are exceptions to the rule. Thus, such women may actually play a role in perpetuating, rather than abolishing, these negative stereotypes.

==== Mentorship ====
In STEM fields, the support and encouragement of a mentor can make a lot of difference in women's decisions of whether or not to continue pursuing a career in their discipline. This may be particularly true for younger individuals who may face many obstacles early on in their careers. Since these younger individuals often look to those who are more established in their discipline for help and guidance, the responsiveness and helpfulness of potential mentors is incredibly important. However, many women experience harassment from their mentors which can cause them to be unable to finish the program among many other issues. In 2017, Scientific American reported that two-thirds of female students or trainees in anthropology, archeology and life science research had experienced sexual harassment or inappropriate remarks, and 20% had been sexually assaulted; they stated that they were most vulnerable to senior managers.

A 2020 study surveyed women who are working in STEM fields and live in the U.S., Northeast, and Eastern Canada. Most women reported that finding a mentor at their workplace was complex, and only a third of the women had some sort of mentor, formal or informal. During their time in school, half of the participants were able to find a professor to be their mentor. They added that mentorship helped them complete their degree and guided them from the educational sphere to the workplace. The majority of the women agreed that mentorship is a crucial resource, and many want to be involved in mentorship, but there are not enough resources or opportunities in their work environment.

==== Lack of support ====
In 2015, Texas A&M University researchers cited six family-related challenges encountered by women in STEM careers: "1) overlap of biological clock and the timeline for career advancement, 2) pregnancy and childbirth, 3) quality childcare, 4) eldercare challenges, 5) dual-career couple challenges, and 6) balancing critical career experiences with family demands."

"Hostile climates, caregiving burdens, and lack of inclusive policies continue to drive women—especially mothers and women of color—out of STEM careers. Women report significantly higher rates of perceived penalization for the use of parental support systems than men," the American Association of University Women has stated. Among employees in STEM professions in G20 countries, UNESCO reported lower levels of satisfaction among female workers around parental support and career management.

==== Sexual harassment and violence ====
In 1993, The New England Journal of Medicine indicated that three-quarters of women students and residents were harassed at least once during their medical training. The 2020 Tribeca Film Festival documentary, "Picture a Scientist", highlighted the severe sexual and physical harassment women in STEM fields can face, often without adequate recourse. In that film Jane Willenbring, a female scientist and associate professor at Scripps Institution of Oceanography, shared how she was harassed by her mentor David R. Marchant during her fieldwork. She was called many demeaning names, harassed when using the bathroom, and even had shards of volcanic sand blown into her eyes.

In 2024, UNESCO found that 49% of women scientists in G20 countries said they had been sexually harassed at work. That report also cited studies finding that two-third of women in Europe in STEM professions at universities and research institutions had experienced gender-based violence.

==== Lack of role models ====
In engineering and science education, women made up almost 50 percent of non-tenure track lecturer and instructor jobs, but only 10 percent of tenured or tenure-track professors in 1996. In addition, the number of female department chairs in medical schools did not change from 1976 to 1996. Moreover, women who do make it to tenured or tenure-track positions may face the difficulties associated with holding a token status. They may lack support from colleagues and may face antagonism from peers and supervisors. Research has suggested that women's lack of interest may in part stem from stereotypes about employees and workplaces in STEM fields, to which stereotypes women are disproportionately responsive.

==== Clustering and leaky pipeline ====
In the early 1980s, Rossiter put forth the concept of "territorial segregation" or occupational segregation, which is the idea that women "cluster" in certain fields of study. For example, "women are more likely to teach and do research in the humanities and social sciences than in the natural sciences and engineering", and the majority of college women tend to choose majors such as psychology, education, English, performing arts, and nursing.

Rossiter also used "hierarchical segregation" as an explanation for the low number of women in STEM fields. She describes "hierarchical segregation" as a decrease in the number of women as one "moves up the ladder of power and prestige." This is related to the leaky STEM pipeline concept. The metaphor of the leaky pipeline has been used to describe how women drop out of STEM fields at all stages of their careers. In the U.S., out of 2,000 high school aged persons, 1944 were enrolled in high school fall 2014. Assuming equal enrollment for boys and girls, 60 boys and 62 girls are considered "gifted." By comparing enrollment to the population of persons 20–24 years old, 880 of the 1,000 original women, and 654 of the original 1,000 men will enroll in college (2014). In freshman year 330 women and 320 men will express an intent to study science or engineering. Of these only 142 women and 135 men will actually obtain a bachelor's degree in science or engineering, and only 7 women and 10 men will obtain a PhD in science or engineering.

=== Psychological ===
==== Lack of interest ====
A meta-analysis concluded that men prefer working with things and women prefer working with people. When interests were classified by RIASEC type (Realistic, Investigative, Artistic, Social, Enterprising, Conventional), men showed stronger Realistic and Investigative interests, and women showed stronger Artistic, Social, and Conventional interests. Sex differences were also found for more specific measures of interest in engineering, science, and mathematics, where men favored these interests.

In a 3-year interview study, Seymour and Hewitt (1997) found that perceptions that non-STEM academic majors offered better education options and better matched their interests was the most common (46%) reason provided by female students for switching majors from STEM areas to non-STEM areas. The second most frequently cited reason given for switching to non-STEM areas was a reported loss of interest in the women's chosen STEM majors. Additionally, 38% of female students who remained in STEM majors expressed concerns that there were other academic areas that might be a better fit for their interests. Preston's (2004) survey of 1,688 individuals who had left sciences also showed that 30 percent of the women endorsed "other fields more interesting" as their reason for leaving.

Advanced math skills do not often lead women to be interested in a STEM career. A Statistics Canada survey found that even young women of high mathematical ability are much less likely to enter a STEM field than young men of similar or even lesser ability.

A 2018 study originally claimed that countries with more gender equality had fewer women in science, technology, engineering and mathematics (STEM) fields. Some commentators argued that this was evidence of gender differences arising in more progressive countries, the so-called gender-equality paradox. However, a 2019 correction to the study outlined that the authors had created a previously undisclosed and unvalidated method to measure "propensity" of women and men to attain a higher degree in STEM, as opposed to the originally claimed measurement of "women's share of STEM degrees". Harvard researchers were unable to independently recreate the data reported in the study. A follow-up paper by the researchers who discovered the discrepancy found conceptual and empirical problems with the gender-equality paradox in STEM hypothesis.

==== Lack of confidence ====
According to A. N. Pell, the pipeline has several major leaks spanning the time from elementary school to retirement. One of the most important periods is adolescence. One of the factors behind girls' lack of confidence might be unqualified or ineffective teachers. Teachers' gendered perceptions on their students' capabilities can create an unbalanced learning environment and deter girls from pursuing further STEM education. They can also pass these stereotyped beliefs onto their students. Studies have also shown that student-teacher interactions affect girls' engagement with STEM. Teachers often give boys more opportunity to figure out the solution to a problem by themselves while telling the girls to follow the rules. Teachers are also more likely to accept questions from boys while telling girls to wait for their turns. This is partly due to gender expectations that boys will be active but that girls will be quiet and obedient. Prior to 1985, girls were provided fewer laboratory opportunities than boys. In middle and high school, science, mathematics, mechanics and computers courses are mainly taken by male students and also tend to be taught by male teachers. A lack of opportunities in STEM fields could lead to a loss of self-esteem in math and science abilities, and low self-esteem could prevent people from entering science and math fields.

One study found that women steer away from STEM fields because they believe they are not qualified for them; the study suggested that this could be fixed by encouraging girls to participate in more mathematics classes. Out of STEM-intending students, 35% of women stated that their reason for leaving calculus was due to lack of understanding the material, while only 14% of men stated the same. The study reports that this difference in reason for leaving calculus is thought to develop from women's low level of confidence in their ability, and not actual skill. This study continues to establish that women and men have different levels of confidence in their ability and that confidence is related to how individual's performance in STEM fields. It was seen in another study that when men and women of equal math ability were asked to rate their own ability, women will rate their own ability at a much lower level. Programs with the purpose to reduce anxiety in math or increase confidence have a positive impact on women continuing their pursuit of a career in the STEM field. Not only can the issue of confidence keep women from even entering STEM fields, but even women in upper-level courses with higher skill are more strongly affected by the stereotype that they (by nature) do not possess innate ability to succeed. This can cause a negative effect on confidence for women despite making it through courses designed to filter students out of the field.

==== Stereotype threat ====
Stereotype threat arises from the fear that one's actions will confirm a negative stereotype about one's in-group. This fear creates additional stress, consuming valuable cognitive resources and lowering task performance in the threatened domain. Individuals are susceptible to stereotype threat whenever they are assessed in a domain for which there is a perceived negative stereotype about a group to which they belong. Stereotype threat undermines the academic performance of women and girls in math and science, which leads to an underestimation of abilities in these subjects by standard measures of academic achievement. Individuals who identify strongly with a certain area (e.g., math) are more likely to have their performance in that area hampered by stereotype threat than those who identify less strongly with the area. This means that even highly motivated students from negatively stereotyped groups are likely to be adversely affected by stereotype threat and thus may come to disengage from the stereotyped domain. Negative stereotypes about girls' capabilities in mathematics and science drastically lower their performance in mathematics and science courses as well as their interest in pursuing a STEM career. Studies have found that gender differences in performance disappear if students are told that there are no gender differences on a particular mathematics test. This indicates that the learning environment can greatly impact success in a course.

Stereotype threat has been criticized on a theoretical basis. Several attempts to replicate its experimental evidence have failed. The findings in support of the concept have been suggested to be the product of publication bias.

A study was done to determine how stereotype threat and math identification can affect women who were majoring in a STEM related field. There were three different situations, designed to test the impact of stereotype on performance in math. One group of women were informed that men had previously out-performed women on the same calculus test they were about to take. The next group was told men and women had performed at the same level. The last group was told nothing about how men had performed and there was no mention of gender before taking their test. Out of these situations, women performed at their best scores when there was no mention of gender. The worst scores were from the situation where women were told that men had performed better than women. For women to pursue the male-dominated field of STEM, previous research shows that they must have more confidence in math/science ability.

=== Innate versus learned skill ===
Some studies propose the explanation that STEM fields (and especially fields like physics, math and philosophy) are considered by both teachers and students to require more innate talent than skills that can be learned. Combined with a tendency to view women as having less of the required innate abilities, researchers proposed that this can result in assessing women as less qualified for STEM positions. In a study done by Ellis, Fosdick and Rasmussen, it was concluded that without strong skills in calculus, women cannot perform as well as their male counterparts in any field of STEM, which leads to the fewer women pursuing a career in these fields. A high percentage of women that do pursue a career in STEM do not continue on this pathway after taking Calculus I, which was found to be a class that weeds out students from the STEM pathway.

There have been several controversial statements about innate ability and success in STEM. A few notable examples include Lawrence Summers, former president of Harvard University who suggested cognitive ability at high end positions could cause a population difference. Summers later stepped down as president. Former Google engineer, James Damore, wrote a memo entitled Google's Ideological Echo Chamber suggesting that differences in trait distributions between men and women was a reason for gender imbalance in STEM. The memo stated that affirmative action to reduce the gap could discriminate against highly qualified male candidates. Damore was fired for sending out this memo.

=== Comparative advantage ===
A 2019 study by two Paris economists suggests that women's under-representation in STEM fields could be the result of comparative advantage, caused not by girls' 10% lower performance on math tests, but rather their far superior reading performance, which, when taken together with their math performance, results in almost one standard deviation better overall performance than boys, which is theorized to make women more likely to study humanities-related subjects than math-related ones.

The current gender gap, however, is widely considered to be economically inefficient overall.

== Strategies for increasing representation of women ==
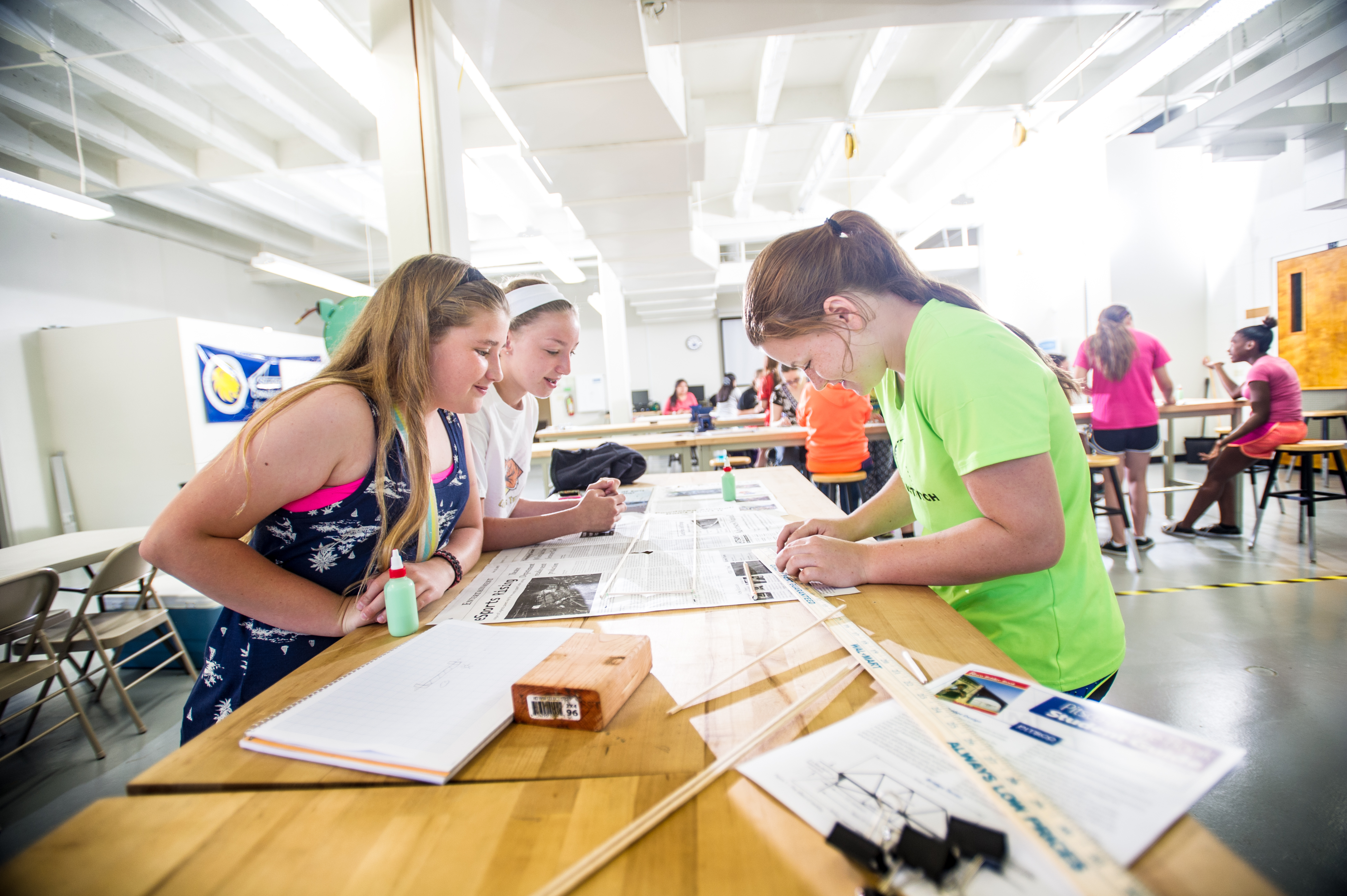
The CMS Girls Engineering Camp at Texas A&M University–Commerce in June 2015

There are a multitude of factors that may explain the low representation of women in STEM careers. Anne-Marie Slaughter, the first woman to hold the position of Director of Policy Planning for the United States Department of State, has recently suggested some strategies to the corporate and political environment to support women to fulfill to the best of their abilities the many roles and responsibilities that they undertake. The academic and research environment for women may benefit by applying some of the suggestions she has made to help women excel, while maintaining a work-life balance.

=== Social-psychological interventions ===
A number of researchers have tested interventions to alleviate stereotype threat for women in situations where their math and science skills are being evaluated. The hope is that by combating stereotype threat, these interventions will boost women's performance, encouraging a greater number of them to persist in STEM careers.

One simple intervention is simply educating individuals about the existence of stereotype threat. Researchers found that women who were taught about stereotype threat and how it could negatively impact women's performance in math performed as well as men on a math test, even when stereotype threat was induced. These women also performed better than women who were not taught about stereotype threat before they took the math test.

==== Role models ====
One of the proposed methods for alleviating stereotype threat is through introducing role models. One study found that women who took a math test that was administered by a female experimenter did not suffer a drop in performance when compared to women whose test was administered by a male experimenter. Additionally, these researchers found that it was not the physical presence of the female experimenter but rather learning about her apparent competence in math that buffered participants against stereotype threat. The findings of another study suggest that role models do not necessarily have to be individuals with authority or high status, but can also be drawn from peer groups. This study found that girls in same-gender groups performed better on a task that measured math skills than girls in mixed-gender groups. This was due to the fact that girls in the same-gender groups had greater access to positive role models, in the form of their female classmates who excelled in math, than girls in mixed-gender groups. Similarly, another experiment showed that making groups achievements salient helped buffer women against stereotype threat. Female participants who read about successful women, even though these successes were not directly related to performance in math, performed better on a subsequent math test than participants who read about successful corporations rather than successful women. A study investigating the role of textbook images on science performance found that women demonstrated better comprehension of a passage from a chemistry lesson when the text was accompanied by a counter-stereotypic image (i.e., of a female scientist) than when the text was accompanied by a stereotypic image (i.e., of a male scientist). Other scholars distinguish between the challenges of both recruitment and retention in increasing women's participation in STEM fields. These researchers suggest that although both female and male role models can be effective in recruiting women to STEM fields, female role models are more effective at promoting the retention of women in these fields. Female teachers can also act as role models for young girls. Reports have shown that the presence of female teachers positively influences girls' perceptions of STEM and increases their interest in STEM careers.

==== Self-affirmation ====
Researchers have investigated the usefulness of self-affirmation in alleviating stereotype threat. One study found that women who affirmed a personal value prior to experiencing stereotype threat performed as well on a math test as men and as women who did not experience stereotype threat. A subsequent study found that a short writing exercise in which college students, who were enrolled in an introductory physics course, wrote about their most important values substantially decreased the gender performance gap and boosted women's grades. Scholars believe that the effectiveness of such values-affirmation exercises is their ability to help individuals view themselves as complex individuals, rather than through the lens of a harmful stereotype. Supporting this hypothesis, another study found that women who were encouraged to draw self-concept maps with many nodes did not experience a performance decrease on a math test. However, women who did not draw self-concept maps or only drew maps with a few nodes did perform significantly worse than men on the math test. The effect of these maps with many nodes was to remind women of their "multiple roles and identities," that were unrelated to, and would thus not be harmed by, their performance on the math test.

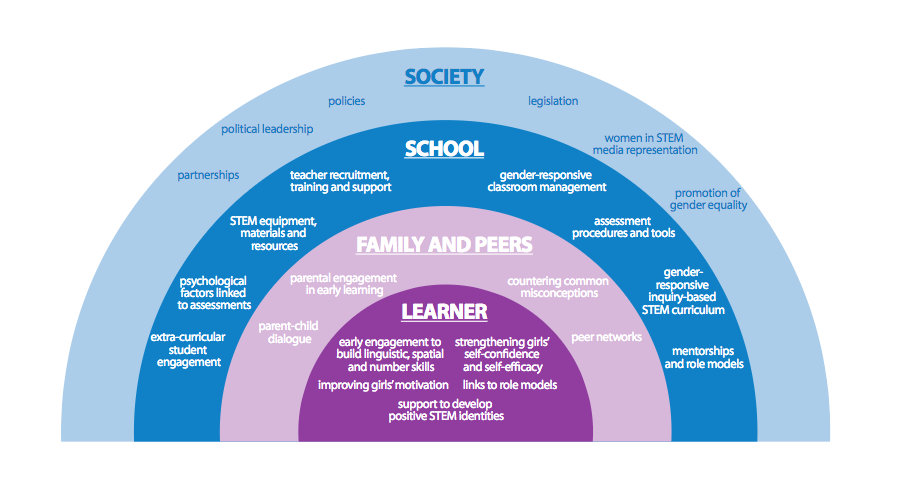
Strategies to increase women's and girls' interest in STEM

=== Organized efforts ===
To increase women's enrollment in the STEM field, researchers believe that it should occur in elementary and middle schools. Gender differences are evident by kindergarten, and many children have developed an attitude towards math and their career. According to a study about high school and middle school students, there is evidence of a gender gap in science and math test scores. Another method to reduce the gender gap is to create communities and opportunities apart from school. For instance, creating a residential program, women's only college, and affiliation between high school and college for STEM programs will help eliminate the gender gap. The research has shown that gender gap in STEM might be because of unsupportive culture that hurts woman's advancement in their career. Therefore, women all over the United States are underrepresented in tenure faculty and leadership positions.

Organizations such as Girls Who Code, StemBox, and Stanford's Women in Data Science Initiative aim to encourage women and girls to explore male-dominated STEM fields. Many of these organizations offer summer programs and scholarships to girls interested in STEM fields.

The U.S. government has funded similar endeavors; the Department of State's Bureau of Educational and Cultural Affairs created TechGirls and TechWomen, exchange programs which teach Middle Eastern and North African girls and women skills valuable in STEM fields and encourage them to pursue STEM careers. There is also the TeachHer Initiative, spearheaded by UNESCO, Costa Rican First Lady, Mercedes Peñas Domingo, and Jill Biden which aims to close the gender gap in STEAM curricula and careers. The Initiative also emphasizes the importance of after school activities and clubs for girls. That's why Dell Technologies teamed up with Microsoft and Intel in 2019 to create an after-school program for young girls and underserved K-12 students across the U.S. and Canada called Girls Who Game (GWG). The program uses Minecraft: Education Edition as a tool to teach the girls communication, collaboration, creativity, and critical thinking skills.

Current campaigns to increase women's participation within STEM fields include the UK's GlamSci, and Verizon's #InspireHerMind project. The US Office of Science and Technology Policy during the Obama administration collaborated with the White House Council on Women and Girls to increase the participation of women and girls within STEM fields along with the "Educate to Innovate" campaign.

In August 2019, the University of Technology Sydney announced that women, or anyone with a long term educational disadvantage, applying to the Faculty of Engineering and Information Technology, and for a construction project management degree in the Faculty of Design, Architecture and Building, will be required to have a minimum Australian Tertiary Admission Rank that is ten points lower than that required of other students.

Programs such as FIRST (For Inspiration and Recognition of Science and Technology) are constantly working to eliminate the gender gap in computer science. FIRST is a robotics community for K–12 students. The activities and competitions in the program are usually about current STEM problems. Students also get practice with business, leadership, and communication skills. According to a 2016 National Science Board report, 67% of men and 47% of women who engaged in the FIRST program intend to major in engineering, compared to 13.7% of men and 2.6% of women entering college in general.

Creative Resilience: Art by Women in Science is a multi-media exhibition and accompanying publication, produced in 2021 by the Gender Section of the United Nations Educational, Scientific and Cultural Organization (UNESCO). The project aims to give visibility to women, both professionals and university students, working in science, technology, engineering and mathematics (STEM). With short biographical information and graphic reproductions of their artworks dealing with the COVID-19 pandemic and accessible online, the project provides a platform for women scientists to express their experiences, insights, and creative responses to the pandemic.

== See also ==
- Sex and intelligence
- International Conference of Women Engineers and Scientists
- Women in science
- Women in computing
- Association for Women in Science
- Association for Women in Mathematics
- Stereotype threat
- Pygmalion effect
- Black sheep effect
- Beyond Bias and Barriers
- Implicit stereotypes
- Gender-equality paradox
- Glass ceiling
- Inequality in the workplace
- STEM fields
- Heuristics in judgment and decision making
- Category:Organizations for women in science and technology
- Margaret W. Rossiter History of Women in Science Prize
- Matilda effect
- Social norm
- African women in engineering
- Timeline of women in science
- Timeline of women in mathematics
