= STEM pipeline =

The STEM pipeline is the educational pathway for students in the fields of science, technology, engineering, and mathematics (STEM). The start and end of this STEM pipeline are disputed, but it is often considered to begin in early education and extend into graduation or an adult career in STEM. Recent research suggests that, rather than a pipeline, students follow a pathway with multiple points of entry and exit throughout their education.

== Description ==
The "pipeline" metaphor is based on the idea that having sufficient graduates requires both having sufficient input of students at the beginning of their studies, and retaining these students through completion of their academic program. The STEM pipeline is a key component of workplace diversity and of workforce development that ensures sufficient qualified candidates are available to fill scientific and technical positions.

The STEM pipeline was promoted in the United States from the 1970s onwards, as “the push for STEM (science, technology, engineering, and mathematics) education appears to have grown from a concern for the low number of future professionals to fill STEM jobs and careers and economic and educational competitiveness.”

Today, this metaphor is commonly used to describe retention problems in STEM fields, called “leaks” in the pipeline. For example, the White House reported in 2012 that 80% of minority groups and women who enroll in a STEM field switch to a non-STEM field or drop out during their undergraduate education. These leaks often vary by field, gender, ethnic and racial identity, socioeconomic background, and other factors, drawing attention to structural inequities involved in STEM education and careers.

== Current efforts ==
The STEM pipeline concept is a useful tool for programs aiming at increasing the total number of graduates, and is especially important in efforts to increase the number of underrepresented minorities and women in STEM fields. Using STEM methodology, educational policymakers can examine the quantity and retention of students at all stages of the K–12 educational process and beyond, and devise programs and interventions to improve educational processes and outcomes. STEM programs focus on increasing social and academic supports for students. STEM programs may also focus on bringing students together with professionals in their field, to provide mentoring, role models and learning opportunities in industry.

Maintaining a healthy and diverse STEM pipeline has been a concern in several developed countries, such as the United Kingdom, the United States, and Germany.

=== United States ===
In the United States, although efforts to increase the number of women and African Americans in STEM fields have been ongoing, as recently as 2010 the results have been evaluated as "poor". In 2014, one report declared that "traditionally underrepresented groups remain underrepresented", while another article commented, "You can go through your entire scholarly trajectory in computer science without seeing one face of color", where "of color" refers to African Americans.

STEM pipeline programs in the US have been created at various levels. Examples include: the Technology Leadership Institute at the University of Pittsburgh at the college and university level, the Nevada STEM pipeline at the state level, Stanford University's Women in Data Science Initiative offers workshops and educational resources at the secondary and university level, and the Broadening Participation in Computing Alliances at the national level.

=== United Kingdom ===
The United Kingdom has created pipeline programs, including an ambassador program. the ambassador program allows teachers to partner with industry professionals to help mentor students and talk about potential career paths. All mentors in the program are volunteers and teachers in the United Kingdom have a portal where they can request aid from a volunteer. The program's origins can be traced back to a letter sent to the prime minister by the Council of Science and Technology in 2012 that covered the core values that should make stem more accessible. This letter outlined the core values as "integrated delivery, governance and accountability across the curriculum, teaching, testing, STEM access, and career advice and guidance".

==== SpLDs ====
The Council of Science and Technology has also researched education methods that better support students with Specific Learning Difficulties (SpLDs) that go down the STEM pipeline. Research done by the council in 2020 found three areas where the education system can improve with education for students with SpLDs in STEM. The first problem was identification; schools have been looking to see students struggling to diagnose, which causes many students to remain undiagnosed. The next area Identified was changes to the support system. The researchers concluded that the support system can be improved by involving parents. the research concludes that resources like workshops for parents on better supporting their students are a good next step for adding support. Lastly, they also looked into technology-based interventions but concluded that more work needed to be done before they could be effectively used.

== Educational attainment factors ==
High Schools in the United States implement a STEM pipeline program that combines a dual pathway that enhances mathematical, engineering, and scientific skills along with a supportive group that aims to help underrepresented students aspire to become leaders in the STEM field. Students benefit from the moral support and motivational skills that mentors implement for their correct academic preparation. Teachers, and college mentors become in the life of the students in the program a guidance in their path to be the next generation of leaders. Furthermore, staff members aid students to feel integrated and cared for their well-being. In their path to pursue higher education in the STEM fields, underrepresented students are awarded scholarships that aid them throughout their college years. Scholarships are a factor that allows underrepresented to focus on their academic and allows them to be persistent throughout their years in college.

The STEM pipeline program provides a multitude of workshops, and extracurricular activities to work on social and professional development. Moreover, it arranges networking with minorities that went through the program and now currently work in the science, or health field. In addition, to the benefits as an alumnus of the program, every student is invited to become advocates within their community with the goal of increasing the amount of underrepresented students in STEM fields

The support of programs such as the STEM pipeline program aims to increase diversity in the workplace with the ambition to create an inclusive safe area where all the members of the team can contribute to the development of innovative ideas in their respective field. Additionally, the diversity of collaborating with different ideas enhances the outcome of the team's desired goal, and facilitates better planning of the timeline.

== Public reactions ==
The concept of the STEM pipeline has been met with resistance for its pragmatic overtones. National Science Board Vice Chairman Kelvin Droegemeier calls for a movement away from thinking about the necessary number of STEM workers, in favor of considering the necessary knowledge and skills for the success of all workers.

The linearity of the STEM pipeline concept has been criticized as neglecting the wide variety of possible career pathways, including interdisciplinary studies, intermittent careers, and STEM-informed work in non-technical fields. A 2015 commentary in Inside Higher Ed suggested that the "leaky pipeline" metaphor may be viewed as pejorative towards individuals who leave the academic track for employment, or use their technical background as the basis for a career in a non-technical field.

A 2015 commentary in Science observed that Margaret Thatcher and Angela Merkel could be considered two "leaks" in the pipeline.

Some have said that increasing the STEM pipeline is not enough to promote workplace diversity. Advocates for women and minorities in STEM such as Tracy Chou have argued that STEM companies must also focus on internal reforms, such as reevaluating inequitable hiring practices and unsupportive workplace culture.

== See also ==
- Structural inequality in education
- Women in science
- Women in STEM fields
- Racial diversity and discrimination in STEM fields
