= Keri Sather-Wagstaff =

American mathematician and academic administrator

- Occupation: Professor

Academic background
- Education: University of Utah
- Thesis: Dimension Inequality for Excellent, Cohen-Macaulay Rings Related to the Positivity of Serre’s Intersection Multiplicity (2000)
- Doctoral advisor: Paul C. Roberts

Academic work
- Discipline: Mathematics
- Sub-discipline: Commutative algebra
- Institutions: North Dakota State University (2007-2015); Clemson University (2015-present)

Keri Ann Sather-Wagstaff is an American mathematician and academic administrator, the associate provost of Framingham State University in Framingham, Massachusetts. Educated as a commutative algebraist, she lists her current professional focus as "intersectional equity, justice, and inclusive excellence". She is known for her work to improve diversity in STEM fields, particularly for members of the LGBTQ+ community.

== Education and career ==
Sather-Wagstaff majored in mathematics at the University of California, Berkeley, graduating in 1993. She continued her studies in mathematics at the University of Utah, working there in commutative algebra with Paul Roberts. She received a master's degree in 1998, and completed her Ph.D. in 2000, with the dissertation A Dimension Inequality for Excellent Cohen-Macaulay Rings Related to the Positivity of Serre's Intersection Multiplicity.

After postdoctoral research in mathematics at the University of Illinois Urbana-Champaign, and short-term assistant professorships at the University of Nebraska–Lincoln, California State University, Dominguez Hills, and Kent State University, Sather-Wagstaff became an assistant professor at North Dakota State University in 2007, and was tenured as an associate professor there in 2012. She moved to Clemson University in 2015, and became a full professor there in 2019. In 2022 she went on leave from Clemson to become a rotating program director at the National Science Foundation, in its directorate for STEM education. She moved to Framingham State University as its associate provost in early 2025.

== Recognition ==
Sather-Wagstaff was named by the Association for Women in Mathematics to the 2023 Class of AWM Fellows, "for her sustained advocacy, support and mentorship of women, girls, gender minorities, and other historically underrepresented groups in mathematics; and for spearheading local and national efforts targeting high-need areas to improve the working environment for all".

== Personal life ==
Sather-Wagstaff is a transgender woman, and identifies as neurodivergent. She is part of the first generation of her family to obtain a college education.
