= Emily H. Griffith =

American statistician

Emily Hohmeister Griffith is an American statistician. She is associate professor of the practice and associate department head in the Department of Statistics at North Carolina State University. Topics in her research publications have included the application of spatial statistics to animal science, the statistical analysis of women and underrepresented minorities in STEM fields, and the training of statistical consultants.

== Education and career ==
Griffith is originally from Tallahassee, Florida. She began studying statistics in high school as a way of avoiding advanced mathematics course, and went on to major in statistics at Florida State University, only to discover that as a statistics major she could not actually avoid mathematics. She graduated with minors in mathematics and Spanish in 2003, and then went to North Carolina State University for graduate study in statistics. She earned a master's degree in 2005, and completed her Ph.D. in 2008. Her dissertation, Catch Curve and Capture Recapture Models: A Bayesian Combined Approach, was supervised by Kenneth Pollock, and co-advised by Sujit Ghosh.

As a graduate student she worked as a contractor for the National Ocean Service, and she became a postdoctoral researcher at the Patuxent Wildlife Research Center, before taking a position as a survey statistician for the Federal Bureau of Investigation. In 2013 she returned to academia and to North Carolina State University, as a research assistant professor of statistics. She became director of the statistical consulting core in 2017, was promoted to research associate professor in 2018, and became deputy director of the Statistical and Applied Mathematical Sciences Institute in 2019. Her interest in the training of statistical consultants began more recently, with the production of a sequence of videos on the topic produced through the American Statistical Association.

== Recognition ==
Griffith was named as a Fellow of the American Statistical Association in 2023.
