= Matataua Glacier =

Glacier in the Royal Society Range

Matataua Glacier, formerly Marchant Glacier (78°6′S 162°3′E) is a glacier, about 7 nautical miles (13 km) long, which drains the slopes of Rampart Ridge between Mount Bishop and Mount Potter and flows northwest to the vicinity of Mount Bockheim, in the Royal Society Range, Victoria Land, Antarctica.

== Name ==
It was named by the Advisory Committee on Antarctic Names in 1994 after David R. Marchant, a glacial geologist at the University of Maine (and from 1995 at Boston University). In connection with Antarctic field work since 1985, Marchant discovered and used volcanic ashes to infer paleoclimate change and geologic stability in the McMurdo Dry Valleys and map the glacial history of the East Antarctic Ice Sheet. Marchant was put on paid administrative leave by Boston University in February 2018 for sexually harassing multiple female graduate students in Antarctica. In 2019, BU President Robert A. Brown terminated Marchant's employment. The incidents are thoroughly chronicled in the documentary Picture a Scientist.

It was renamed Matataua Glacier by ACAN/BGN in September 2018 because of its proximity to Mata Taua Peak. The name Matataua Glacier represents a change in designation that brings the name of this feature into alignment with ACAN policies.
