= Wetech =

Non-profit organisation in Lagos

- Founded: 2019
- Type: 501(c)(3) Non-profit organization
- Purpose: Women in Technology and Entrepreneurship
- Location: Lagos, Nigeria
- Region served: Global
- Key people: Gabriella Uwadiegwu (Co-Founder & President); Flora Uwadiegwu (Co-Founder & Vice President)
- Website: wetech.africa

Wetech is a non-profit organisation founded in 2019. It is headquartered in Lagos, Nigeria and focuses on Women in Technology. It runs an annual women in tech conference, which has had 1500 attendees, as of 2024.

== History ==
Wetech was established in 2019 by Gabriella Uwadiegwu. Flora Uwadiegwu later joined the organisation. The organisation's first event, held in August 2019, was a women-in-tech panel session in Lagos.

Following its launch, Wetech's early activities centred on community building and awareness. In 2020, the organisation transitioned to virtual programming during the pandemic, maintaining its network while scaling down large in-person events. By 2021, Wetech resumed physical convenings and hosted a conference that gathered about 150 participants, its largest event at the time. That same year, the organisation launched its first Wetech Ambassadors Cohort, made up of students and working professionals across diverse areas of technology, representing Wetech's growing presence across different regions and industries.

In 2022, Wetech hosted its first large-scale annual conference in Lagos, themed "We Are Here, A Thousand of Us", which drew a thousand attendees and featured panels on digital inclusion, emerging technologies, and entrepreneurship.

In 2023, Wetech introduced the Female Founders Conference, focused on women entrepreneurs in technology and early-stage startups. In 2024, Wetech celebrated its five-year milestone conference, which gathered more than 1,500 attendees and industry partners from across Africa. Since its founding, the organization has expanded its programming to include mentorship cohorts and demo days, culminating in the Wetech Mentorship Program Demo Day, which showcases mentee-led projects across various technology fields.

== Activities ==
Wetech supports women entrepreneurs through workshops, funding opportunities, and pitch competitions designed to strengthen women-led innovation in Africa's technology ecosystem. The organisation introduced its first experimental pitch program in 2021, which later evolved into the PitchHER competition in 2022, a structured annual competition featuring prize funding and participation from investors. Since its launch, PitchHER has provided visibility and funding opportunities for early-stage women founders. Over three consecutive years, PitchHER winners have gone on to join global accelerator programs that invested hundreds of thousands of dollars in their ventures, while others have successfully raised funding through Wetech's investor network.
