= Rampart Ridge =

Ridge in the Royal Society Range in Antarctica

- Location within Antarctica

Geography
- Continent: Antarctica
- Range coordinates: 78°10′S 161°55′E

Rampart Ridge (78°10′S 161°55′E) is a prominent broken ridge on the west side of the Royal Society Range, Antarctica. It stands north of Rutgers Glacier and extends from The Spire to Bishop Peak.

== Exploration and name ==
Rampart Ridge was surveyed and given this descriptive name in February 1957 by the New Zealand Northern Survey Party of the Commonwealth Trans-Antarctic Expedition (CTAE), 1956–58.

== Location ==
Rampart Ridge is to the east of The Portal and the Upper Staircase, in the west of the Royal Society Range. The Spire is at its western extremity. Rutgers Glacier flows west and then southwest past the south of the ridge. Bishop Peak is at the eastern end of the ridge. The Johns Hopkins Ridge is to the east, across the névé of the Rutgers Glacier.

== Features ==
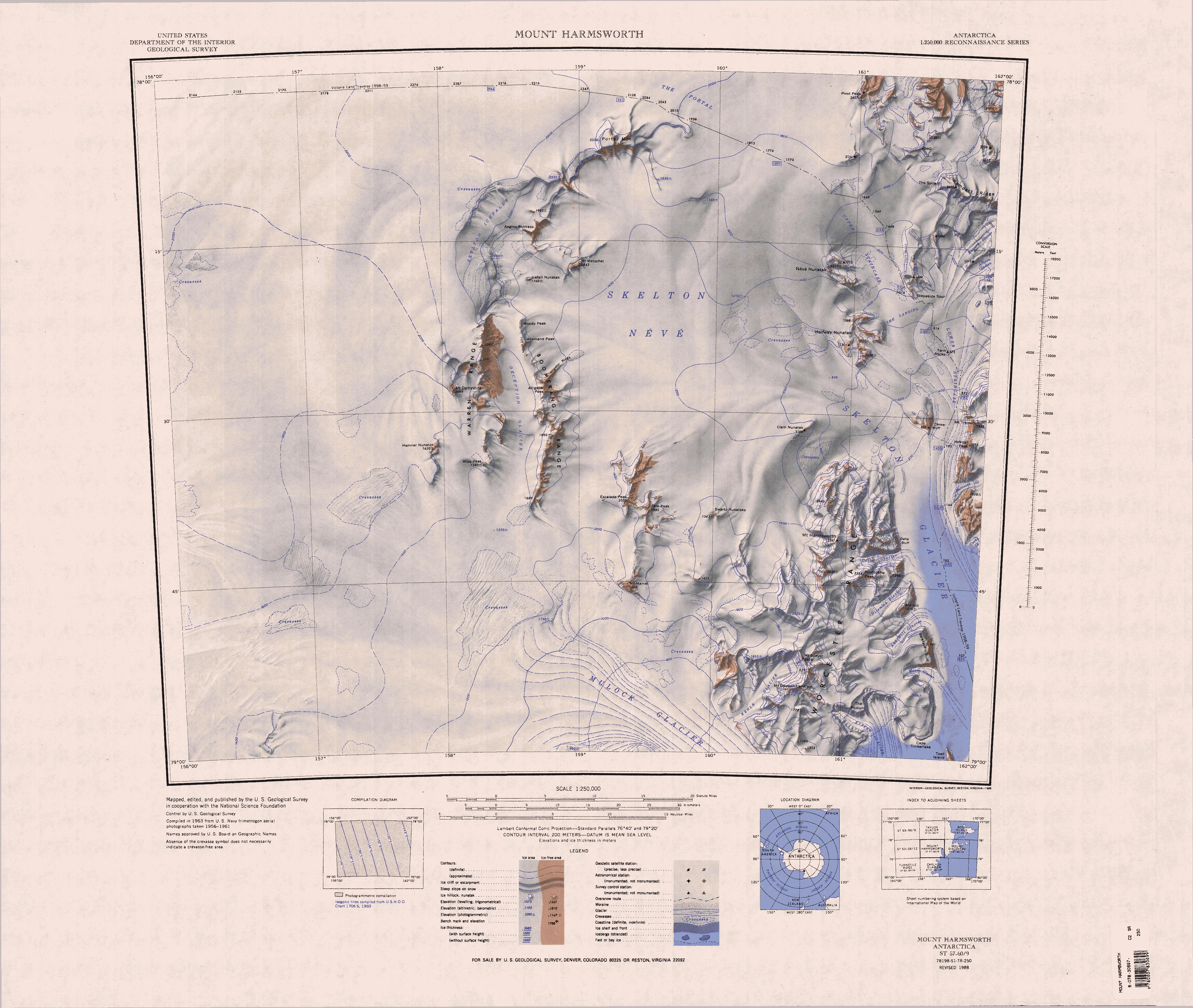
Western part of Rampart Ridge in northeast of map.

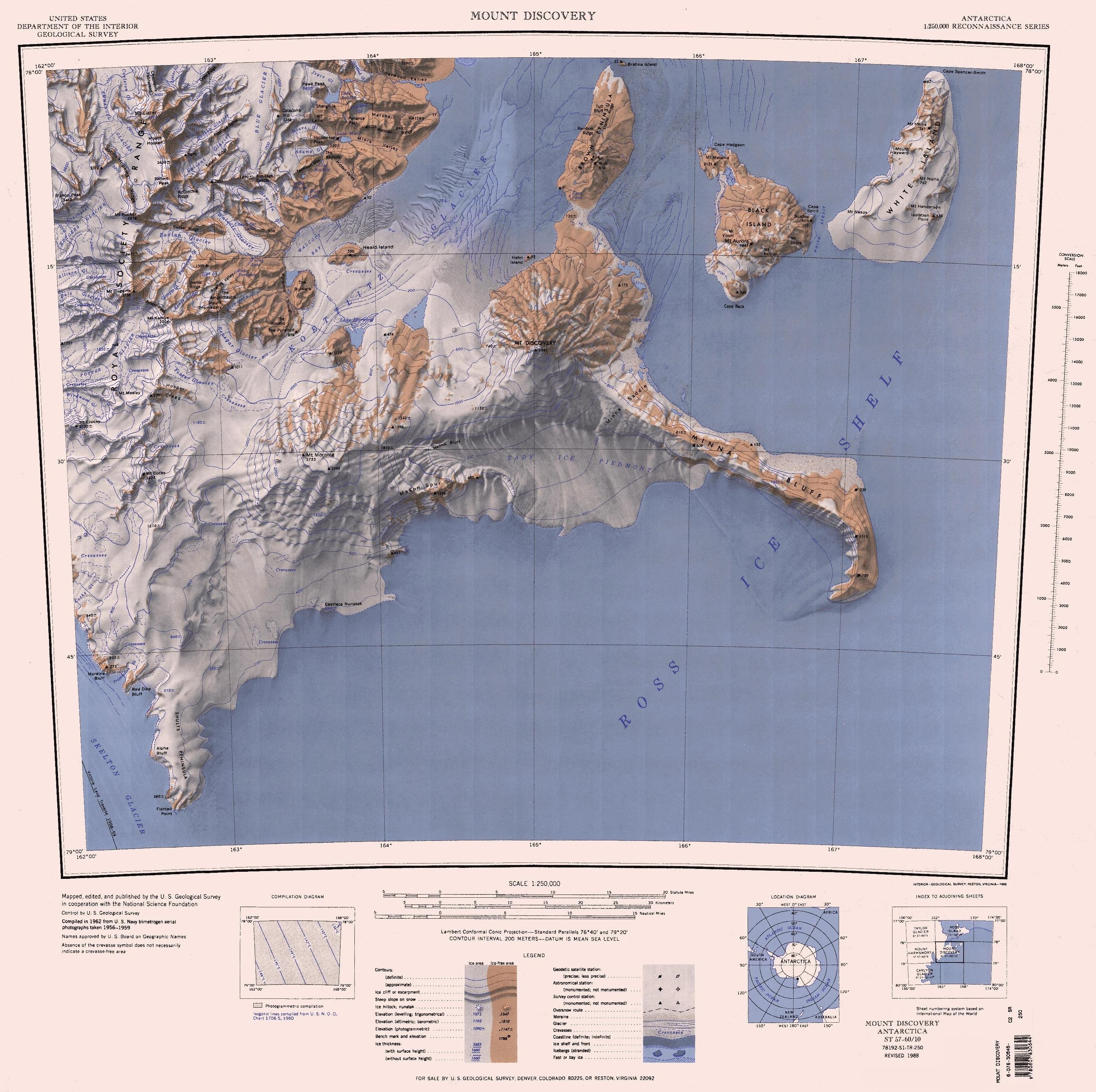
Eastern part of Rampart Ridge in northwest of map.

Features of the ridge include, from west to east:

=== The Spire ===
78°09′S 161°37′E. A prominent rock spire, over 2,600 metres (8,500 ft) high, surmounting .the west extremity of Rampart Ridge. Surveyed and descriptively named in 1957 by the N.Z. party of the CTAE, 1956–58.

=== Shupe Peak ===
78°10′S 161°55′E. A prominent peak, 2,910 metres (9,550 ft) high, of Rampart Ridge, located 4 nautical miles (7.4 km; 4.6 mi) east-southeast of The Spire. Named by United States Advisory Committee on Antarctic Names (US-ACAN) in 1994 after Gordon H. Shupe, United States Geological Survey (USGS) cartographic technician; conducted geodetic operations during three austral field seasons 1990–94; USGS team leader for International Global Positioning System (GPS) Campaign, 1991–92, at McMurdo, Byrd, South Pole Stations, and the Pine Island Bay area. The team established the first continuous-tracking GPS reference station in Antarctica.

=== Mount Lynch ===
78°10′S 162°04′E. One of the high peaks 3,340 metres (10,960 ft) high in Rampart Ridge, rising between Shupe Peak and Bishop Peak. Named by US-ACAN in 1994 after John Lynch, NSF representative at the South Pole for a portion of the austral summer season since 1986; at the time of naming, Program Manager for Polar Aeronomy and Astrophysics, Office of Polar Programs, NSF.

=== Bishop Peak ===
78°10′S 162°09′E. A sharp peak rising to 3,460 metres (11,350 ft) high near the center of Rampart Ridge. Mapped by USGS from ground surveys and Navy air photos. Named by US-ACAN in 1963 after the Bernice P. Bishop Museum, Honolulu, which has sent many researchers to Antarctica.

=== Sladen Summit ===
78°07′S 162°23′E. A prominent peak rising to 3,395 metres (11,138 ft) high at the intersection of the Johns Hopkins Ridge and Rampart Ridge. Named by US-ACAN in 1994 after William J.L. Sladen, an American of British birth; FIDS medical officer at Hope Bay (1940^9) and Signy Island (1950–51); United States ArmyRP principal investigator (penguins) at Cape Crozier for many years.

== Nearby features ==
Nearby features include:

=== Matataua Peak ===
78.1166667°S 161.95°E A prominent peak on the ridge separating the mouth of Matatua Glacier and Ferrigno Glacier. A Maori name meaning “a scout before the troops.” Named by New Zealand Geographic Board (NZGB) (1994) in reference to the view from this 3,013 metres (9,885 ft) high peak. To the northeast, there is an array of rocky peaks; to the southwest, the view overlooks Rampart Ridge and the large Upper Staircase glacier. The name was changed in September 2018 to the one-word form, by ACAN/BGN based upon recommendation from the NZGNB as the correct Maori form.

=== Matataua Glacier ===
78°06′S 162°03′E. A glacier about 7 nautical miles (13 km; 8.1 mi) long, which drains the slopes of Rampart Ridge between Mount Bishop and Mount Potter and flows northwest to the vicinity of Mount Bockheim. The glacier was formerly called Marchant Glacier.

=== Maine Ridge ===
78.0727778°S 162.0941667°E A ridge that extends northwest–southeast between Matataua Glacier and Tedrow Glacier. Named by US-ACAN (1994) after the University of Maine, Orono, in association with the names Emmanuel Glacier, Johns Hopkins Ridge, and Rutgers Glacier in the immediate area.

=== Ferrigno Glacier ===
78°08′S 161°59′E. A broad glacier on the north side of Rampart Ridge, flowing west-northwest from Mount Lynch and Bishop Peak to the vicinity of The Spire. Named by US-ACAN in 1994 after Jane G. Ferrigno, USGS geologist, specialist in the use of satellite imagery to study and map Antarctica, and other ice and snow areas throughout the world; co-editor (with Richard S. Williams Jr.) of Satellite Image Atlas of Glaciers of the World.

=== Cooke Bluff ===
78°13′S 161°45′E. A bold ice-covered bluff between Ruecroft Glacier and Rutgers Glacier, to the south of Rampart Ridge. Named by US-ACAN in 1994 after William B. Cooke, USGS cartographer in the Branch of Special Maps, 1951–87, who made significant contributions to the mapping of Antarctica.

=== Rampart Terrace ===
78.1833333°S 162.0166667°E A relatively level ice-covered terrace, 5 nautical miles (9.3 km; 5.8 mi) long and rising to 2,250 metres (7,380 ft) high, adjoining the south-central part of Rampart Ridge. The abrupt southern face of the terrace rises about 200 to 300 metres (660 to 980 ft) high above Rutgers Glacier. Named byUS-ACAN (1994) in association with Rampart Ridge.

== Sources ==
- Alberts, Fred G., ed. (1995), Geographic Names of the Antarctic (PDF) (2 ed.), United States Board on Geographic Names This article incorporates public domain material from websites or documents of the United States Board on Geographic Names.
- "Maine Ridge", Geographic Names Information System, United States Geological Survey, United States Department of the Interior
- "Matataua Peak", Geographic Names Information System, United States Geological Survey, United States Department of the Interior
- Medina, Jennifer (September 24, 2018), "Sexual Harassment Allegations Wipe a Name Off the Map", New York Times
- Mount Discovery, USGS: United States Geological Survey
- Mount Harmsworth, USGS: United States Geological Survey
- "Rampart Terrace", Geographic Names Information System, United States Geological Survey, United States Department of the Interior

This article incorporates public domain material from websites or documents of the United States Geological Survey.
