= Racial diversity and discrimination in STEM fields =

According to the National Science Foundation (NSF), women and racial minorities are underrepresented in science, technology, engineering, and mathematics (STEM). Scholars, governments, and scientific organizations from around the world have noted a variety of explanations contributing to this lack of racial diversity, including higher levels of discrimination, implicit bias, microaggressions, chilly climate, lack of role models and mentors, and less academic preparation.

== Race imbalance in STEM in the United States ==
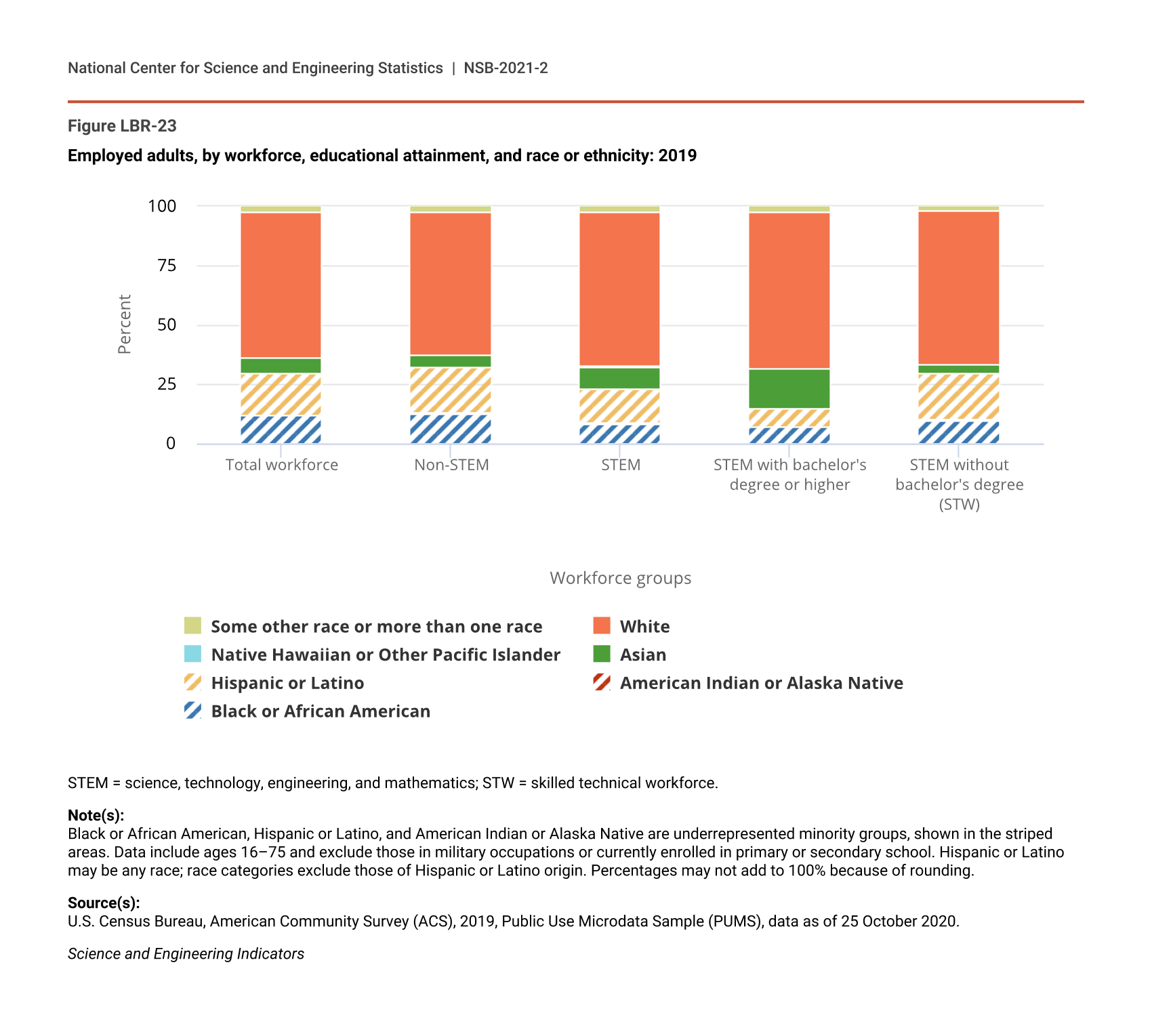
Employed adults, by workforce, educational attainment, and race and ethnicity: 2019.

Racial minorities, with the exception of Asian Americans, are underrepresented through every stage of the STEM pipeline.

=== Education and degree attainment ===
Racial disparities in high school completion are a prominent reason for racial imbalances in STEM fields. While only 1.8% of Asian and 4.1% of White students drop out of high school, 5.6% of Black, 7.7% of Hispanic, 8.0% of Pacific Islander, and 9.6% of American Indian/Alaskan Native students drop out of high school. Among those that graduate high school, 67% of Whites, 62% of Blacks, and 69% of Hispanics enroll in a “degree granting college.” While there is no measurable difference in college enrollment of White, Black, and Hispanic STEM students, only 15% of Black students who initially enrolled in a STEM major received a STEM bachelor's degree at graduation, compared to 30% of White and Asian students.

=== Employment, occupation, and income ===
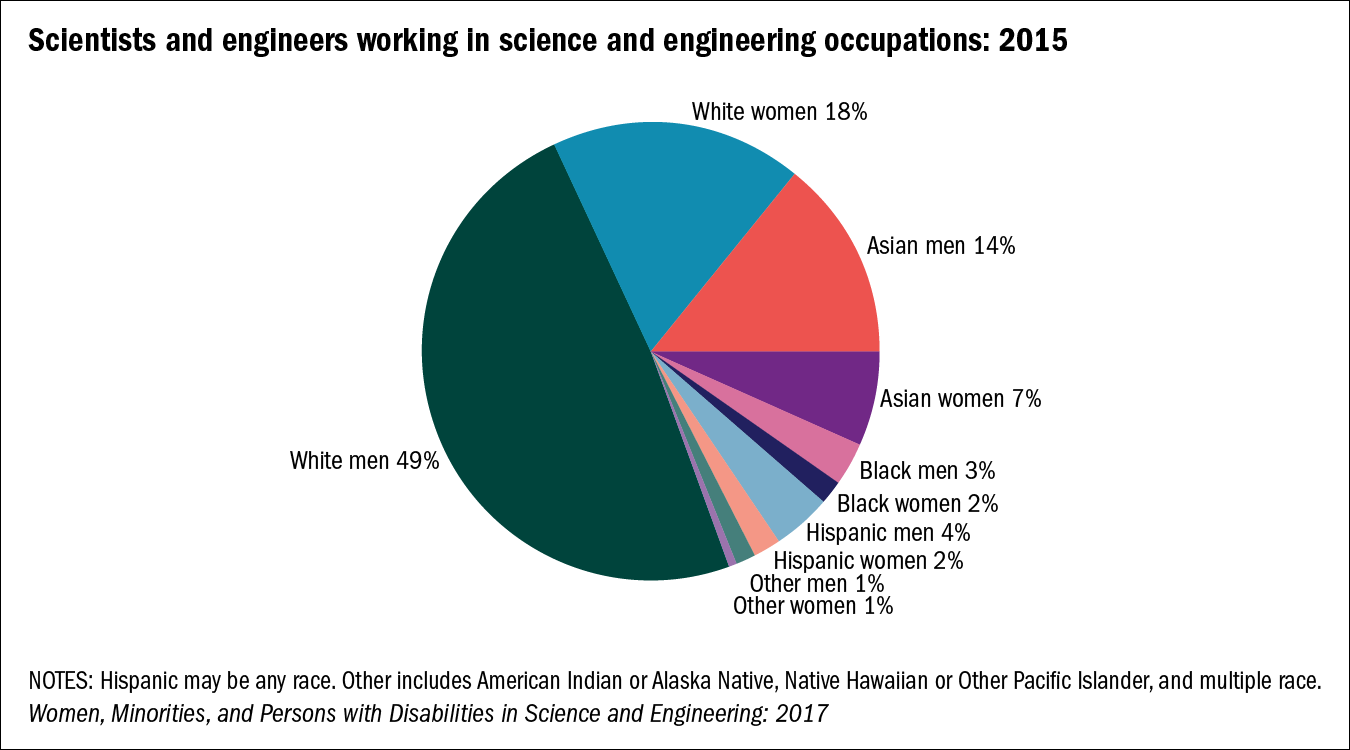
National Science Foundation: Scientists and engineers working in science and engineering occupations: 2015

According to the National Science Board, which provides statistical data on the U.S. labor force, Asians represent 9%, Whites 65%, Hispanics 14%, and Blacks 9% of the STEM labor force. In particular, white men are 49% of the STEM labor force. Among different STEM fields, Blacks make up only 4% of life science, 5% of engineering, 6% of physical sciences, 7% of the computer science, 9% of math and 11% of health-related sciences. There are also significant wage gaps between women, men, and people of color, especially in STEM jobs. An example of this disadvantage is the gender pay gap and racial pay gap in computer science fields, where women earn about 74% of what men earn and the median income for White workers is approximately 23.3% more than the median income for Blacks. The gender and racial pay gaps in STEM fields are significantly greater than all regular non-STEM jobs with an even greater pay gap between these gender, racial, and ethnic groups. When first being hired, 35% of women of color reported negotiating their salaries, but nearly 50% wished that they had negotiated their salary after starting the job. Many of these women reported being initially satisfied with the salary they had been offered when being hired, but later learned that they were earning much less than other workers at their same level.

=== Effects of under-representation of people of color in STEM ===
Among Black workers in STEM fields, 57% feel that there too little attention being directed toward adding more racial and ethnic diversity in the workplace. This lack of diversity contributes to isolation and a lack of social support in the workplace which can increase anxiety and depression for many people of color in STEM.History shows that Black scientists have been at the forefront of some of the most important scientific breakthroughs, from the creation of the GPS to the first successful treatment of leprosy, yet they were denied credit for the discovery, blocked from academic positions, and away from their respective fields due to racial discrimination at the time.

== Explanations for the under-representation for people of color ==
Recently, scholars have begun applying the framework of systemic racism to explain the experiences of racial minorities in STEM. Specifically, research indicates that people of color, especially blacks, experience higher levels of discrimination, incur various microaggressions, and a lack of overall mentorship and support in STEM.

=== Stereotypes and preconceived notions of STEM ===
Scientific racism of the late 19th and early 20th centuries attempted to identify biological, intellectual, and physiological differences among races. Lasting effects of the scientific racism include racial stereotypes about students of color and preconceived notions of STEM as predominantly a white, male field. A study highlighting the under-representation of women and racial minorities in STEM found that Asian and White candidates were viewed as more competent and worthy to hire rather than Black and Latino/a candidates. Similarly, survey results from this study show that students were much more likely to recognize and name white male STEM professionals than Black or women STEM professionals. Additionally, students of color on college campus often face prevailing societal misconceptions and assumptions that they are affirmative action beneficiaries, on sport scholarships, and/or “at-risk” students. Students of color additionally must contend with stereotype threat that has been found to lower academic achievement. In particular, high-achieving Black students, attempting to combat prevailing stereotypes about their lack of intelligence, while Asian students combat the prevailing model minority stereotype presuming they are biologically predisposed to mathematical ability.

=== Stem identity ===
The development of a STEM identity increases the overall likelihood that a student will continue to develop scientific literacy and pursue a STEM career. The National Research Council's 2009 report describes students developing STEM identities as learning to “think about themselves as science learners and develop[ing] an identity as someone who knows about, uses and sometime[s] contributes to science.” Black girls are less likely to develop STEM identities in middle school because they have fewer science-related experiences outside of school and less confidence in their scientific ability than Asian-American, Latina, and White middle school girls, making them less likely to enter STEM fields in the future. Additionally, research demonstrates that beyond first-hand experience with science, societal norms, stereotypes, and interactions with peers, teachers, and family contribute to the development of a STEM identity.

=== Microaggressions ===
People of color and underrepresented minority groups in science, technology, engineering and math are more likely than whites to experience racial microaggressions. Studies show racial microaggressions that occur on college campus weaken students sense of belonging, make it difficult to form relationships with faculty, and contribute to less cultural alignment with STEM. At predominantly white institutions (PWI) environmental microaggressions are common in shared laboratory spaces among students and during meetings with faculty and advisors. Black female students are especially likely to feel alienated and isolated from their peers in STEM departments.

=== Implicit bias ===
Research on implicit bias demonstrates that as early as preschool teachers are likely to hold implicit bias against students of color, especially Black boys. While Black children make up 19% of preschool enrollment, they account for about half of preschool suspension. Implicit biases among teachers, faculty, and colleagues makes it more difficult for students of color to form relationships, network with professionals in their fields, and find valuable mentors. Judgments placed upon people of color based on implicit biases are incredibly damaging and contribute to stereotype threat, which affects their overall performances. For instance, Black women are often assumed to be under-qualified forcing them to prove that they deserve to be in those spaces as was the case of Katherine Johnson depicted in Disney's "Hidden Figures".

=== Sense of belonging ===
When people do not feel welcome in a place, environment, or institution, they are less likely to feel they belong and more likely to withdraw. In particular, women and people of color often adopt individual strategies of assimilation or patriarchal bargaining in their attempt to gain acceptance. For example, Black male scientists adopt coping strategies to endure racialized interactions with colleagues and managers. Similarly, Black female undergraduates students describe coping with racism on campus by gravitating toward same-race peers, faculty, and staff. When underrepresented groups are forced to adapt or leave the field altogether, it costs STEM valuable talent and perspectives that could be used to advance scientific discoveries and advancements.

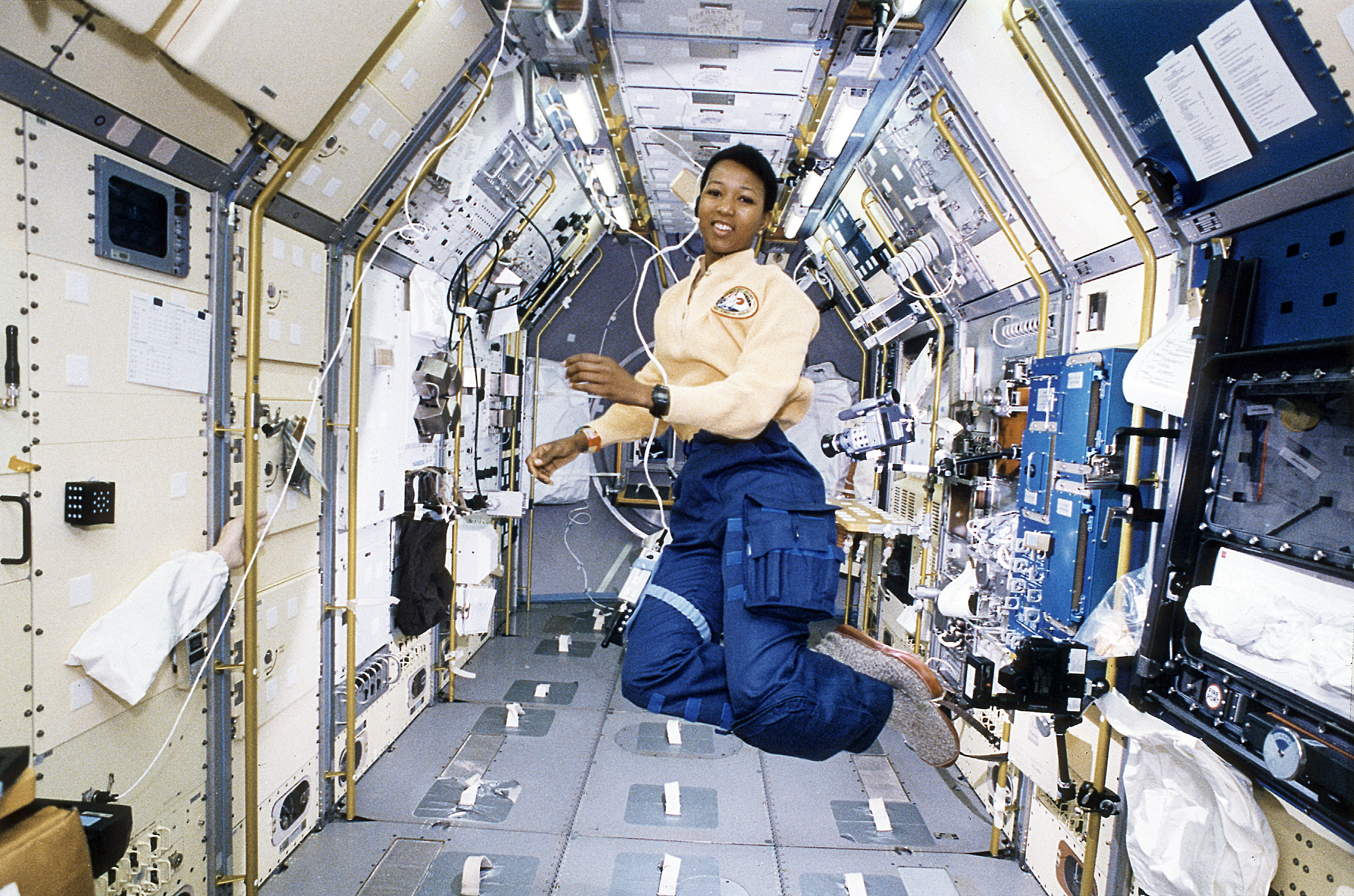
Mae Jemison in Space

=== STEM pipeline ===
The STEM pipeline starts to narrow early as students of color face additional barriers to STEM participation in school. The following are some examples of these barriers.

==== Primary and secondary schools ====
Research indicates that racial disparities in science achievement test scores begin as early as third grade. These test score disparities were attributed to both socioeconomic status gaps between races and school qualities. In particular, Black and Hispanic students are more than double as likely to live in low-income neighborhoods compared to White students which directly contributes to less money for local public schools and indirectly less funding for STEM programs. Black and Latino/a may not always have the same access to higher level high school courses that are building blocks for success in College STEM fields. For example, those who have not taken high school trigonometry, calculus, or physics, are put at a disadvantage in terms of graduating with a STEM degree. Beyond academic preparation, experiences with STEM across various settings, including school, home, and out-of-school, help students of color see STEM careers as more possible. STEM researchers Vincent Basile & Kevin Murray both argued that major federal STEM education policy reports have consistently failed to address the need for more teachers of color in K-12 STEM classrooms, despite calling for increased minority student participation in STEM careers.

==== College ====
While Black males are twice as likely as their white peers to declare a STEM major upon entering college, they are less likely to graduate with a STEM degree. Scholars point to microaggressions, a chilly climate, and lack of role models and mentors as contributing to students of color being "weeded out” of STEM majors. Additionally, one study examining Black male engineering graduate students found that microaggressions from counselors, mentors, and fellow students resulted non-normative role strain. On top of all this, many black scientists receive less biomedical funding research than their white counterparts, due to the fact the community-focused research topics they tend to pursue are considered higher risk are systemically undervalued by grant reviewers. These actors increase the likelihood that people of color leave STEM majors.

==== Mentorship ====
Because white men are still overrepresented in STEM fields there is a lack of available mentorship from faculty and scientists of color. As a result, students of color in STEM feel unheard, excluded, and lose opportunities to make connections with peers. Research does indicate that students of color at HBCU's are much more likely to perceive their mentors to be supportive and describe more positive interactions with peers.

==== Work ====
Underrepresented minorities, including women, people of color, and LGBT individuals are more vulnerable to experience discrimination, isolation, and/or harassment in their workplaces. A Pew survey of men and women in STEM indicates that 50% of women in STEM experienced gender-related discrimination at work and about 62% of Black people in STEM jobs stated they experienced racial discrimination at work. Additionally, 72% of Black STEM workers believe that facing racial discrimination is a major reason why there are not more people of color in STEM fields.

== Strategies for increasing participation of people of color in STEM ==
Under-representation of people of color in STEM is a problem that is rooted to white supremacy and racism.

=== Bias training ===
Many scholars and organization recommend elimination of bias as a means to increase representation in STEM. Specifically, implicit bias, training of students, managers, faculty, and even students is seen as one way to combat stereotypes and reduce microaggressions targeting people of color. Additionally, incorporating implicit bias statements and policies can strengthen a commitment to diversity and inclusion within institutions.

=== Protective factors ===
Those in STEM fields have recognized that there is an extensive history of poor representation of women and people of color in STEM and are working to close the gap. Addressing this issue requires a coherent and sustained effort across multiple fronts. Professor Lesley Yellowlees from the Royal Society of Edinburgh argues that single intervention does not work, but that sustainable and strategic reform in education, work place, and within communities would put our theory in to practice. Transforming the perception of STEM in the early education years for students of color necessitates celebration of the distinct contribution that women and people of color bring to science, technology, engineering, and mathematics.

=== Teachers ===
While many teachers are highly dedicated to reducing the race gap and actively striving to create equal opportunities in their classrooms, they can actually contribute to the STEM race gap. Research suggest that a teacher's attitude towards their profession is a strong predictor towards their attitude towards STEM, with emotional readiness, cognitive readiness, and self efficacy all playing prominent roles. This means that teachers who are under-prepared or lack any sort of confidence in STEM are less likely to teach it correctly, which will affect students of color who already face systemic factors in the education system. It is important that teachers understand that their actions impact students’ futures more than they may realize.

=== Role models ===
One of the most promoted solutions is the need for role models. While both female and male role models can be effective in recruiting women in STEM fields there is a lack of role models of color to mentor POC in STEM fields. When individuals have someone to look up to that looks like them, they are more willing to stay in the field and develop a sense of belonging. Opportunities to engage and connect with individuals in STEM allows for excitement to be a part of this community and the development of a stronger STEM identity.

=== Mentors ===
Mentors provide students the academic and social support they need to succeed in STEM, however, having same-race mentorship is an important step in retaining students of color in STEM. Not only do students of color report more positive interactions with same-race faculty, they are also more likely to develop stronger STEM identities.

=== Organized efforts ===
There is a growing number of organizations whose goal is to increase diversity in STEM fields by encouraging girls and women to thrive in STEM environments. An example of one of these organizations is Girls Who Code. Their mission is to successfully close the gender gap in new entry-level tech jobs by 2030. Girls Who Code focuses their work not only on gender diversity but also on young women who are historically underrepresented in computer science fields, including African American/Black, Hispanic or Latina, Bi/ Multiracial, Native American/Alaskan, and Native Hawaiian/Pacific Islander, those who come from low-income backgrounds, specifically free and/or reduced lunch eligible, and those who have had a lack of exposure or access to computer science. Girls Who Code acknowledges and values the intersections of race/ethnicity, gender identity and expression, class, sexual orientation, ability, age, national origin, and religious/spiritual identities.

Similarly, Black girls who participated in I AM STEM, a community nonprofit organization designed to increase STEM participation among underrepresented groups, engaged directly in first-hand scientific research which contributed to stronger connections to STEM.

== Important scientists, engineers, and mathematicians ==
- Katherine Johnson
- West Area Computers
- Dorothy Vaughan
- Mary Jackson
- Raychelle Burks
- Jedidiah Isler
- Ellen Ochoa
- Ruby Hirose
- Rebecca Lee Crumpler
- France A. Cordova
- Claudia Alexander
- Susan La Flesche Picotte
- Alice Ball
- Janaki Ammal
- Linda Garcia Cubero
- Hedy Lamarr
- Nadine Caron
- Neil deGrasse Tyson
- John Herrington
- Mary G. Ross
- Luis Walter Alvarez
- Ella Cara Deloria
- Witri Wahyu Lestari
- Aaron Yazzie
- Nanibaa' Garrison

== See also ==
- Racial discrimination
- Imposter syndrome
- Racial Diversity in United States Schools
- Internalized Racism
- Institutional Racism
- White Privilege
- Racial Wage gap
- Society for the Advancement of Chicanos/Hispanics and Native Americans in Science
- National Society of Black Engineers
- National Organization for the Professional Advancement of Black Chemists and Chemical Engineers
- Stereotype Threat
- Microaggressions
- Harassment
- Gendered Racism
- Scientific Racism
- Women in STEM
- STEM Pipeline
- Structural Inequality in Education
- Underrepresented Groups in STEM
- Implicit Stereotype
- Racial equality
- Hidden Figures
- Marginalization
- Affirmative action
