= Ari Daniel Shapiro =

American journalist

Ari Daniel Shapiro is a freelance science journalist based in Boston, Massachusetts. Shapiro is a science reporter for National Public Radio. He previously reported on a freelance basis for NPR, as well as Public Radio International, The New York Times, and Nova. He is a native of South Euclid, Ohio.

== Education ==
- Ph.D. in biological oceanography from MIT and the Woods Hole Oceanographic Institution
- Boston College, 2001
- Charles F. Brush High School, 1997

In college, Shapiro was a summer intern at Woods Hole Oceanographic Institution. He worked on a project with killer whales. He later got a master's degree from the University of St. Andrews in Scotland, where he studied grey seal pups.

== Career ==
In addition to his work as a reporter, Shapiro is a Senior Producer for The Story Collider, a live storytelling show. He says that he works to achieve greater science literacy for his listeners, telling Nieman Storyboard, "That’s why I don’t like to think about dumbing something down. I think people can handle complexity. Because I think people are curious beings somewhere inside."

Upon joining NPR in 2023, Shapiro changed his air name to Ari Daniel, to avoid confusion with "All Things Considered" host Ari Shapiro.
