= The Story Collider =

American non-profit

- Genre: Storytelling
- Language: English

Cast and voices
- Hosted by: Misha Gajewski

Music
- Opening theme: ghost
- Ending theme: ghost

Production
- Production: Misha Gajewski, Erin Barker, Zhen Qin, Nakeysha Roberts Washington

Publication
- No. of episodes: >600

Related
- Website: www.storycollider.org

The Story Collider is a US-based non-profit group dedicated to telling true, personal stories about science. Their mission is to empower both scientists and nonscientists alike with the skills they need to tell these stories and share them through their live shows and podcast, with the goal of exploring the human side of science.

== Programs ==
=== Live events ===
Every year, The Story Collider produces between 40 and 50 live storytelling shows across the United States, United Kingdom, New Zealand, and Canada featuring stories about science that are both "stand-up funny and powerfully confessional," according to The Wall Street Journal.

The organization now regularly holds shows in New York, Boston, Washington, D.C., Los Angeles, St. Louis, Atlanta, Toronto, Vancouver, and Wellington, New Zealand. In addition, The Story Collider has worked with various partners to produce one-off shows in other locations. Past and current partnerships include public radio's Studio 360 with Kurt Andersen, St. Louis Public Radio, Springer Nature, Scientific American, the American Geophysical Union, the Society for the Advancement of Chicanos/Hispanics and Native Americans in Science, the American Association for the Advancement of Science, the Gulf of Mexico Research Initiative, Fermilab, and universities such as Yale, Cambridge and many more.

=== Podcast ===
The weekly podcast, which started in October 2010, features two stories from the live shows in each episode and has generated over nine million downloads to date. In 2017, the podcast was included in Salon's "13 Science Podcasts for Short Attention Spans"; Business Insider's "Best Science Podcasts That Make You Smarter"; Popular Science's "The Best Science Podcasts to Make You Smarter"; The Scientist's 11 Best Science Podcasts; and Audible Feast's "Best Podcast Episodes of 2017." In 2019, The Washington Post called the stories, "devastating, delightful, and endlessly listenable." A recent study in the journal Life Sciences Education found that college students who listened to a selection of Story Collider stories over the course of a semester shifted their perception of what types of people can be scientists, and came away with better grades in the class, increased interest in science, and a vision of a possible future in it for themselves.

=== Workshops ===
In addition to live performances, the Story Collider also conducts workshops at universities and conferences around the world with the goal of empowering scientists as storytellers. The Story Collider has worked with elite institutions like Yale, Cornell, and Cambridge University, powerhouse state schools, and small community colleges alike.

== Leadership ==
The Story Collider is currently led by Erin Barker, a Moth GrandSLAM-winning storyteller and writer who also produces the weekly podcast along with Zhen Qin and Misha Gajewski.

== Storytellers ==
As of Spring 2018, more than a thousand stories have been told at The Story Collider. Notable storytellers include:

=== Comedians and actors ===
- Wyatt Cenac, comedian, actor, writer, director
- Aparna Nancherla, comedian, actress
- Josh Gondelman, comedian, writer for HBO's Last Week Tonight
- Jo Firestone, actress, comedian, writer
- Hallie Haglund, comedian, writer for The Daily Show and head writer for Wyatt Cenac's Problem Areas
- Myq Kaplan, comedian
- Mara Wilson, writer, actress
- Elna Baker, writer, performer
- Ophira Eisenberg, comedian and host of NPR's Ask Me Another
- Dave Hill, comedian, radio host, writer, musician, actor

=== Journalists and media ===
- Ira Flatow, host of Science Friday
- Jon Ronson, author
- Carl Zimmer, author
- Ed Yong, author
- Joe Palca, journalist
- David Epstein, author
- Deborah Blum, author
- Susannah Cahalan, author
- Seth Mnookin, author
- Andrew Revkin, journalist
- Kelly and Zach Weinersmith, authors
- Amy Harmon, Pulitzer Prize-winning journalist
- Emily Grossman, endocrinologist, British science TV personality
- Arielle Duhaime-Ross, podcast host
- Ari Daniel Shapiro, journalist

=== Scientists and mathematicians ===
- Sara Seager, astronomer, planetary scientist
- Jo Handelsman, microbiologist and former associate director for science under President Obama
- Alan Guth, physicist
- Ken Ono, mathematician
- Moon Duchin, mathematician
- Margaret Geller, astrophysicist
- Scott Barry Kaufman, psychologist
- Alan Lightman, physicist, author
- Esther Perel, psychologist, author
- Stuart Firestein, neurobiologist, author
- Sean Carroll, cosmologist, author
- Raychelle Burks, analytical chemist
- Frances Colón, science diplomat and former Deputy Science & Technology Advisor to the U.S. Secretary of State
