= Raychelle Burks =

American scientist and science communicator

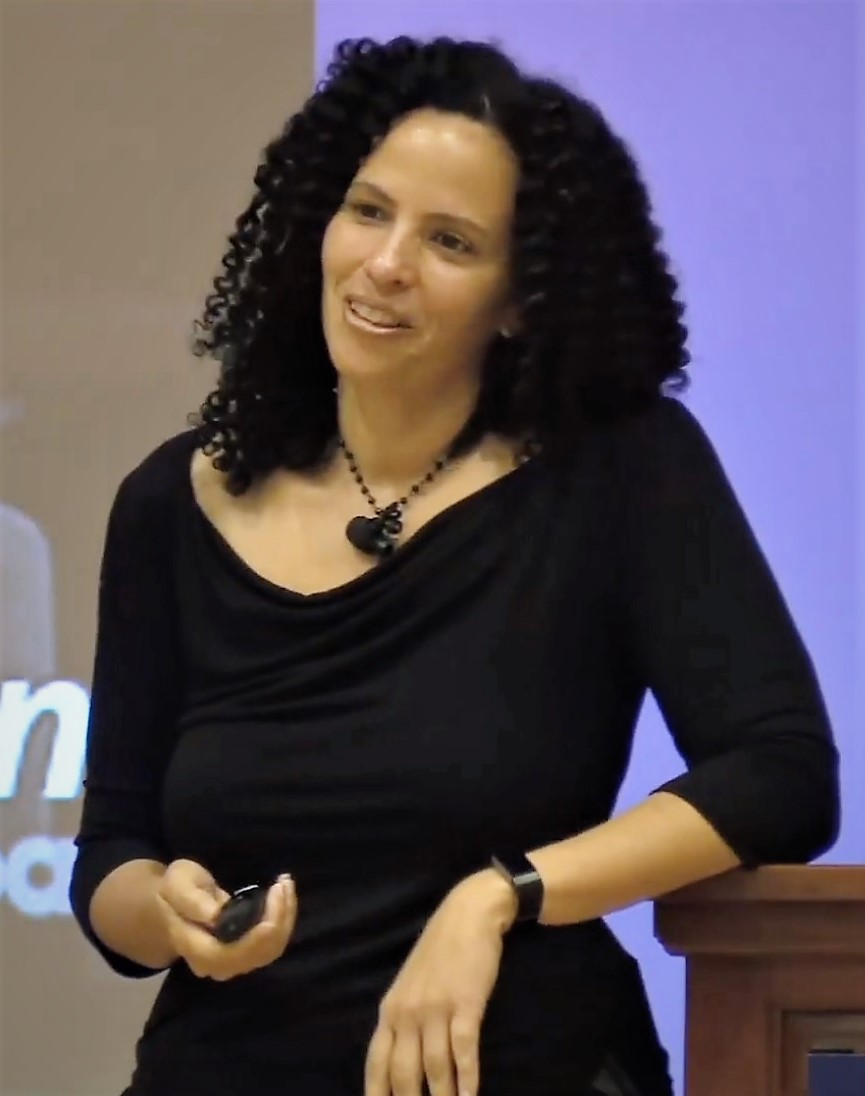
- Burks speaks in 2019
- Education: University of Northern Iowa Nebraska Wesleyan University University of Nebraska–Lincoln
- Scientific career
- Fields: Analytical chemistry
- Workplaces: American University, Associate Professor, 2020 – Present; St. Edward's University, Assistant Professor, 2016 – 2020; Doane College, Postdoctoral Research Associate, 2013 – 2015

Raychelle Burks is an associate professor of analytical chemistry at American University in Washington, D.C., and science communicator, who has regularly appeared on the Science Channel. In 2020, the American Chemical Society awarded her the Grady-Stack award for her public engagement excellence.

== Early life and education ==
Burks developed an interest in forensic chemistry when she was 12 after a field trip that presented students with a science interaction challenge, asking students to solve a real-world problem using science. Burks earned her BS in chemistry at the University of Northern Iowa, her MSc in Forensic Science at Nebraska Wesleyan University, her PhD in chemistry from the University of Nebraska–Lincoln, and was a postdoctoral research associate at the Doane College.

== Career and research ==
Burks became an assistant professor of chemistry at St. Edward's University in Austin, Texas, in 2016, where she taught and conducted research until 2020. She then moved to Washington, D.C., to join the faculty at American University as an associate professor of chemistry.

Her current research centers on developing low-cost colorimetric sensors for detecting chemicals of forensic interest including explosives and illicit drugs. To maximize portability in the field, her group focuses on transforming smartphones into detection devices. Her research interests lie in the applied science domain, which she believes is well-suited to capturing and holding students' attention because they are working to solve real-world problems. She has spoken about her intersectional research approach to equipping students with the technical knowledge they need to work on these real-world challenges with the United States Department of Defense Science, Technology, and Innovation Exchange.

== Public engagement ==
Burks is a popular science communicator, using pop culture as an anchor to explore chemistry. She appeared on the Science Channel's Outrageous Acts of Science and Reactions, the video series for the American Chemical Society. She has appeared on Mother Jones' Inquiring Minds podcast to share how chemistry can save you from a zombie apocalypse and on The Story Collider podcast with a story from her time working in a crime lab. In early 2020, she appeared on the NPR Short Wave podcast on the episode "A Short Wave Guide to Good - and Bad - TV Forensics". Burks has also contributed to scientific interest pieces for St. Andrew University on using chemistry in every day life. Her writing has been featured in Slate, The Washington Post, UNDARK, and Chemistry World.

Burks is also an advocate for women and underrepresented groups in science, speaking from her experiences as a black woman in STEM. In 2018, Burks was a co-principal investigator for a $1.5 million NSF STEM grant to fund the establishment of the St. Andrew's Institute for Interdisciplinary Science (I4), which would promote internships and research opportunities for underrepresented groups in STEM. She founded the DIYSciZone at GeekGirlCon, bringing scientists and science educators together to give convention attendees hands-on experiences with science experiments. The citation for her American Chemical Society Grady-Stack award read, "Raychelle is a public-scientist extraordinaire... She inspires a love of chemistry by bringing chemistry directly to where her audience is. This direct engagement — her commitment to finding chemistry that can entertain and enlighten people who wouldn't normally think of science — is nothing short of phenomenal". Burks is active on social media to promote her field and fellow scientists.

In 2020, Burks appeared in the Tribeca Film Festival in the film "Picture a Scientist."

== Awards and honors ==
Her awards and honors include;

- 2019 AAAS IF/THEN Ambassador
- 2019 Young Observer Award at the 50th IUPAC General Assembly and 47th World Chemistry Congress in Paris, France
- 2020 American Chemical Society Grady-Stack award for her public engagement excellence
- BBC Science Focus named her one of six women changing chemistry in February 2021
- 2023 Research Corporation for Science Advancement's Robert Holland Jr. Award for Research Excellence and Contributions to Diversity, Equity, and Inclusion
