= Mount Potter =

Mountain in Ross Dependency, Antarctica

Mount Potter (78°8′S 162°17′E) is a mountain in Antarctica named after Noel Potter, Jr., Chairman, Dept. of Geology, Dickinson College, Carlisle, PA. Potter is a glacial geologist who worked in this area during seven seasons.
