= Picture a Scientist =

2020 documentary

- Directed by: Sharon Shattuck, Ian Cheney
- Produced by: Sharon Shattuck, Ian Cheney, Manette Pottle
- Starring: Nancy Hopkins, Raychelle Burks, Jane Willenbring, Mahzarin Banaji
- Cinematography: Naiti Gámez, Emily Topper, Duy Linh Tu
- Edited by: Natasha Bedu
- Release date: June 2020
- Running time: 1h. 43min.
- Country: United States
- Language: English

Picture a Scientist is a 2020 documentary highlighting gender inequality in science. The movie tells the stories of several prominent female researchers, and brings to light the barriers they encountered, including cases of discrimination and harassment. The movie features MIT's professor of biology Nancy Hopkins, the chemist Raychelle Burks and the geoscientist Jane Willenbring, among other scientists.

The film took part in the Tribeca Film Festival in April 2020. It was also nominated for a 2022 News & Documentary Emmy Award in the category of Outstanding Science and Technology Documentary.

A number of research institutions have held screenings of the movie as parts of efforts to increase awareness of gender issues within STEM.

== Overview ==
The documentary follows Hopkins, Burks and Willenbring through discussions of their respective careers and the barriers they faced as women in STEM. Among notable aspects of the documentary, Hopkins describes sexual harassment during her career and the fact that she was refused the same sized laboratory space in comparison to her male counterparts. Burks discusses similar issues of discrimination, including being confused with the janitor at her place of work solely based on her appearance, as well as her added experiences of racism as a black woman in science. Willenbring describes the harassment she faced as a young scientist on a trip to Antarctica with an all male cohort, including being called sexist names, having her abilities diminished due to being a woman, and being physically harassed as a woman, most prominently by the trip leader, David Marchant. Willenbring did not bring these allegations to light for fear of further harassment, not being believed, and the potential detrimental effects on her career. After achieving tenure 16 years later, Willenbring formally complained against Marchant's treatment of her and following an investigation, what was previously named Marchant Glacier in Antarctica became renamed Matataua Glacier instead to acknowledge Marchant's abhorrent behaviour. Marchant was fired by Boston University in 2019, where he was a faculty member in the Department of Earth & Environment in the College of Arts & Sciences. While a five-member BU faculty panel recommended that Marchant be suspended for three years without pay, the university president, Robert A. Brown made the determination to fire Marchant.
