= Jane K. Willenbring =

American geomorphologist (born 1977)

- Born: Jane Kathryn Willenbring; August 2, 1977 (age 49); Mandan, North Dakota, US
- Education: B.S. North Dakota State University, M.A. Boston University, Ph.D. Dalhousie University
- Awards: National Science Foundation CAREER Award (2016) Antarctica Service Medal (2016)
- Scientific career
- Fields: Geomorphology
- Workplaces: Stanford University Scripps Institution of Oceanography, UC San Diego University of Pennsylvania Leibniz University Hannover
- Thesis: Glacial Erosion in Arctic and Atlantic Canada Determined by Terrestrial in situ Cosmogenic Nuclides and Ice Sheet Modeling

Jane Kathryn Willenbring (born August 2, 1977) is an American geomorphologist and professor at Stanford University. She is best known for using cosmogenic nuclides to investigate landscape changes and dynamics. She has won multiple awards including the Antarctica Service Medal and the National Science Foundation CAREER Award.

== Early life and education ==
Willenbring was born on August 2, 1977, to Roys E. and Elaine K. Willenbring. She grew up in Mandan, North Dakota. She developed a curiosity about the landscape and began creating her own small experiments.

Willenbring completed her Bachelor of Science in geosciences/soil science in 1999 at North Dakota State University, where she was McNair Scholar. Willenbring was a graduate student in Earth science at Boston University, where she graduated in 2002. In 2006, Willenbring completed her Ph.D. in Earth Sciences at Dalhousie University in Nova Scotia, Canada. Her thesis investigated glacial erosion in the Arctic and Atlantic Canada using cosmogenic nuclides. Following her Ph.D. work, the National Center for Earth Surface Dynamics awarded Willenbring a Synthesis Postdoctoral Fellowship at the University of Minnesota. Two years later, in 2008, Willenbring was awarded an Alexander von Humboldt Postdoctoral Fellowship at Leibniz University Hannover and GFZ-Potsdam in Germany where she worked until 2010.

== Career and research ==
Following her postdoctoral work in 2010, Willenbring joined the University of Pennsylvania's faculty as an assistant professor in the School of Arts and Sciences' Department of Earth and Environmental Sciences until 2016. Willenbring then became an associate professor at Scripps Institution of Oceanography at UC San Diego where she was also the director of the Scripps Cosmogenic Isotope Laboratory (SCI-Lab). In 2020, Willenbring became an associate professor at Stanford University.

Willenbring's work focuses on how the Earth's surface changes in response to a variety of forces including tectonics, climate, and living organisms. She utilizes high-resolution topographic data, field observations, landscape evolution models, ice sheet models, and geochemical techniques, specifically cosmogenic nuclides, to study the Earth's surface. Willenbring is at the forefront of her field and has developed the use of beryllium-9 and cosmogenic beryllium-10 to trace erosion, weathering, and meltwater pulses in order to study and track the changes in Earth's surface.

Willenbring used some of her cosmogenic nuclide techniques in her research in Antarctica and Puerto Rico. She dated meltwater pulses in Antarctica during warming periods using the ratio of beryllium-10 to beryllium-9. Willenbring is an investigator at the Luquillo Critical Zone Observatory in Puerto Rico where she and her colleagues use beryllium-10, as well as other cosmogenic nuclides, to investigate how Puerto Rico's landscape has affected its biodiversity. Their research has uncovered that nutrient-rich dust travels to Puerto Rico from the Sahara Desert which helps trees to grow in Puerto-Rico's nutrient-poor soil.

In 2016, Willenbring received a National Science Foundation CAREER grant to study how beryllium isotopes can be used to track land-based sediment. Some of the funds will continue her citizen science project, "Soil Kitchen".

In addition to Antarctica and Puerto Rico, Willenbring has also conducted research in Canada, and the South Fork Eel River in Northern California.

== Awards and honors ==
- 2020 American Geophysical Union Earth and Planetary Surface Processes Marguerite Williams Award
- 2018 Geological Society of America Fellow
- 2017 UC San Diego Equal Opportunity/Affirmative Action and Diversity Award
- 2016 US National Science Foundation, CAREER Award
- 2015 Antarctica Service Medal

Willenbring has also received significant funding from the National Science Foundation and the University of Pennsylvania.

== Public engagement ==
Willenbring has been credited with bringing the #MeToo and #TimesUp movement to science. In 2016, she filed a Title IX complaint of sexual harassment against her graduate school adviser, Dr. David R. Marchant. Her story received extensive media attention because the story was released the day after the New York Times story of Harvey Weinstein's alleged sexual assault and harassment that helped spark the viral #MeToo movement. The case led to an investigation by the science committee of the US House of Representatives, as well as the renaming of an Antarctic glacier previously named after Marchant and his firing from Boston University. Her case also contributed to the creation of new policies within professional societies around fellowship and medal award procedures, and to new US National Science Foundation funding policies. She is featured prominently in the 2020 PBS Nova documentary Picture a Scientist, discussing her experiences and opinions on the matter.

Willenbring continues to raise awareness about sexual harassment in academia. She has advocated for the National Science Foundation to promote safer working conditions at all of their funded research sites. She also brought the Growing Up Science lecture series to the Scripps Institution of Oceanography; The series is intended for scientists to share stories on the challenges they faced while throughout their career path. Willenbring was awarded the UC San Diego Equal Opportunity/Affirmative Action and Diversity Award in 2018 for her efforts.

Willenbring also developed the citizen science project "Soil Kitchen". The program allows people to bring in their soils to be tested for heavy metal contamination and soil nutrients. The project is designed to educate the public and clean up urban contamination.

== Personal life and other interests ==
Willenbring has one child, who was born in 2012.
