= David R. Marchant =

American glacial geologist

David R. Marchant is an American glacial geologist and former professor at Boston University. Prior to working at Boston University, Marchant worked at the University of Maine. His approach to glaciology has been described as "stabilism", the belief that the East Antarctic Ice Sheet has remained cold and generally stable for the past 15 million years. In 1994, an Antarctic glacier was named after him.

In 2017, a Boston University investigation concluded that he had violated Title IX regulations by sexually harassing several of his female graduate students. In 2018, Marchant Glacier was renamed Matataua Glacier by the U.S. Board on Geographic Names, and in 2019, he was fired from Boston University.

== Sexual harassment ==
After receiving tenure at Scripps Institution of Oceanography (at UC San Diego) in July 2016, Jane Willenbring filed a Title IX complaint with Boston University in which she stated that on her 1999 Antarctic expedition with Marchant, he repeatedly pushed her down a steep slope, threw stones at her while she was urinating outside, blew shards of volcanic ash into her eyes, and called her a "slut" and a "whore". A second woman stated that he repeatedly called her a "cunt" and a "bitch" and promised to block any NSF research funding for her should she continue her career in academia; she left academia. A third woman, Hillary Tulley, stated that "His taunts, degrading comments about my body, brain, and general inadequacies never ended." Much of Willenbring and Tulley's accounts were corroborated by Adam Lewis (geologist), who was on the trips with Willenbring and Tulley, and who stated that [Marchant] "clearly stated that he did not believe women should be field geologists". These events were covered in the PBS NOVA documentary Picture a Scientist.

Several women graduate students who worked with Marchant in 2008 and later did not report having any bad experiences and praised his character. Lewis stated that "the extreme behavior" he saw from Marchant in those early seasons seemed to have changed such that Marchant's "attitude shifted to simply being distrustful" of women.

In October 2017, the United States House of Representatives science committee launched an investigation into the allegations, noting that Marchant had received over $5.4 million in awards since the late 1990s from NASA and the National Science Foundation.

In November 2017, Boston University concluded that Marchant had sexually harassed Willenbring, but not others.

Marchant was fired by Boston University in 2019, where he was a faculty member in the Department of Earth & Environment in the College of Arts & Sciences. While a five-member BU faculty panel recommended that Marchant be suspended for three years without pay, the university president, Robert A. Brown made the determination to fire Marchant.

Wired Magazine detailed Jane Willenbring's story on April 4, 2024.
