= Women in Data Science Initiative =

In the field of AI and data science, companies lag in their ability to attract and retain talent, innovate, and meet shareholder/stakeholder expectations. As a significant portion of the population, the immense potential of women's talent is still excluded. Women in Data Science (WiDS) addresses the gender imbalance in data science/AI and works to remove barriers along the woman's journey – from her secondary school years to becoming a leader in her field. WiDS was sparked at Stanford University, California by Dr. Margot Gerritsen, Karen Matthys, and Dr. Esteban Arcaute, as the Women in Data Science (WiDS) Worldwide Initiative. Their mission is to achieve 30% representation for women in the field of data science by 2030, with a long-term vision of full and equal representation in decision-making, economic prosperity, and opportunities. WiDS's position on being able to create impact is with a strong network of universities, a global ambassador model, holistic programs addressing data science barriers, and nine years of experience with educational resources, this initiative provides scalable, culturally sensitive support and reaches over 150,000 women worldwide.

== Impact ==
WiDS holds a Women in Data Science Worldwide conference annually, spotlighting only women speakers. These conferences are intended to inspire, educate, and sustain data science worldwide. In 2020, over 30,000 people participated, from 50 different countries. WiDs has reached over 100,000 women around the world. The Pune, India chapter of WiDS, for example, has over 5,000 members. Sucheta Dhere, ambassador of the WiDS Pune Chapter noted that computer vision, natural language processing, and machine learning "have a huge hiring potential in India," particularly for women. In 2019, more than 250 women convened in Madrid for the WIDS conference, which brought together women working on artificial intelligence and robotics. The Cambridge WiDS event was held at the Massachusetts Institute of Technology in 2020. Its signature event was a panel discussion on data science and fake news called “Data Weaponized, data Scrutinized: a war on information".

WiDS elevates women on the WiDS Platform through workshops, webinars, podcasts (on topics ranging from actionable ethics, automating machine learning, data analysis for health, and exploring artificial intelligence) and stories to raise visibility and inspire, while educating and lowering barriers to entry through programs like the Datathon and NextGen Data Days. Additionally, WiDS has global ambassadors which they empower by supporting and amplifying their efforts and providing opportunities for lifelong learning, career development, and progression, including through the WiDS UpLink job platform.

In 2024, WiDS has reached over 150,000 participants globally, including 5,000+ Datathon participants (75% women) from 100 countries, 2,300+ live workshop viewers, 1,000+ ambassadors across 77 countries, and 200 events worldwide, with 54% of ambassadors affiliated with universities or colleges.

Additionally, WiDS offers multiple ways to participate: Collaborators and sponsors support WiDS through active participation and funding of events, initiatives, and programs, while participants engage by attending conferences, workshops, and Datathons, and following WiDS across media platforms. Volunteers assist leadership and ambassadors in executing activities, while speakers, instructors, and podcast guests inspire by sharing knowledge. Ambassadors organize global events, advisors offer expert insights, and the central team leads in developing original content and resources for the community.

WiDS is also available to connect with across multiple social media platforms such as LinkedIn and Facebook Groups, Instagram, and their YouTube channel where they have a variety of content. WiDS also has a website that features blogs, events, monthly newsletters, and programs and resources they have to offer.
