= Structural inequality in education =

Bias built into institutions and systems

Structural inequality is conceptualized as the bias "between social groups within a society or population." Structural inequality occurs when the fabric of organizations, institutions, governments or social networks contains an embedded bias which provides advantages for some members and marginalizes or produces disadvantages for other members. This can involve property rights, status, or unequal access to health care, housing, education and other physical or financial resources or opportunities. Structural inequality is believed to be an embedded part of the culture of the United States due to the history of slavery and the subsequent suppression of equal civil rights of minority races. Structural inequality has been encouraged and maintained in the society of the United States through structured institutions such as the public school system with the goal of maintaining the existing structure of wealth, employment opportunities, and social standing of the races by keeping minority students from high academic achievement in high school and college as well as in the workforce of the country. In the attempt to equalize allocation of state funding, policymakers evaluate the elements of disparity to determine an equalization of funding throughout school districts.p.(14)

Policymakers have to determine a formula based on per-pupil revenue and the student need. p.(8) Critical race theory is part of the ongoing oppression of minorities in the public school system and the corporate workforce that limits academic and career success. The public school system maintains structural inequality through such practices as tracking of students, standardized assessment tests, and a teaching force that does not represent the diversity of the student body. Also see social inequality, educational inequality, racism, discrimination, and oppression. Social inequality occurs when certain groups in a society do not have equal social status. Aspects of social status involve property rights, voting rights, freedom of speech and freedom of assembly, access to health care, and education as well as many other social commodities.

== Education: student tracking ==
Education is the base for equality. Specifically in the structuring of schools, the concept of tracking is believed by some scholars to create a social disparity in providing students an equal education. Schools have been found to have a unique acculturative process that helps to pattern self-perceptions and world views. Schools not only provide education but also a setting for students to develop into adults, form future social status and roles, and maintain social and organizational structures of society. Tracking is an educational term that indicates where students will be placed during their secondary school years.^{[3]} "Depending on how early students are separated into these tracks, determines the difficulty in changing from one track to another" (Grob, 2003, p. 202).

Tracking or sorting categorizes students into different groups based on standardized test scores. These groups or tracks are vocational, general, and academic. Students are sorted into groups that will determine educational and vocational outcomes for the future. The sorting that occurs in the educational system parallels the hierarchical social and economic structures in society. Thus, students are viewed and treated differently according to their individual track. Each track has a designed curriculum that is meant to fit the unique educational and social needs of each sorted group. Consequently, the information taught as well as the expectations of the teachers differ based on the track resulting in the creation of dissimilar classroom cultures.

== Access to college ==
Not only the classes that students take, but the school they are enrolled in has been shown to have an effect on their educational success and social mobility, especially ability to graduate from college. Simply being enrolled in a school with less access to resources, or in an area with a high concentration of racial minorities, makes one much less likely to gain access to prestigious four-year colleges. For example, there are far fewer first time freshmen within the University of California (UC) system who graduate from schools where the majority population is an underrepresented racial minority group. Students from these schools comprise only 22.1% of the first time freshmen within the UC system, whereas students from majority white schools make up 65.3% of the first time freshman population. At more prestigious schools, like UC Berkeley, the division is even more pronounced. Only 15.2% of first time freshmen who attend the university came from schools with a high percentage of underrepresented minorities.

Issues of structural inequality are probably also at fault for the low numbers of students from underserved backgrounds graduating from college. Out of the entire population of low-income youth in the US, only 13% receive a bachelor's degree by the time they are 28. Students from racial minorities are similarly disadvantaged. Hispanic students are half as likely to attend college than white students and black students are 25% less likely. Despite increased attention and educational reform, this gap has increased in the past 30 years.

The costs required to attend college also contribute to the structural inequality in education. The higher educational system in the United States relies on public funding to support the universities. However, even with the public funding, policymakers have voiced their desire to have universities become less dependent on government funding and to compete for other sources of funding. The result of this could sway many students from low-income backgrounds from attending higher institutions due to the inability of paying to attend. In a 2013 study by the National Center for Educational Statistics, only 49% of students from low-income families that graduated from high school immediately enrolled into college. In comparison, students from high-income families had an 80% immediate college enrollment rate. Furthermore, in another 2013 report, over 58% of low-income families were minorities. In the Bill and Melinda Gates Foundation supported survey, researchers discovered that 6 in 10 students that dropped out was due to the inability to pay for the cost of attending themselves and without help from their families.

== Access to technology ==
Gaps in the availability of technology, the digital divide, are gradually decreasing as more people purchase home computers and the ratio of students to computers within schools continues to decreases. However, inequities in access to technology still exist due to the lack of teacher training and, subsequently, confidence in use of technologic tools; the diverse needs of students; and administrative pressures to increase test scores. These inequities are noticeably different between high need (HN) and low need (LN) populations. In a survey of teachers participating in an e-Learning for Educators online professional development workshop, Chapman finds that HN schools need increased access and teacher training in technology resources. Though results vary in their level of significance, teachers of non-HN schools report more confidence in having adequate technical abilities to simply participate in the workshop; later surveys showed that teachers of HN schools report that "they use, or will use, technology in the classroom more after the workshop" less likely than that of teachers of non-HN schools. Additionally, teachers from HN schools report less access to technology as well as lower technical skills and abilities (p. 246). Even when teachers in low-SES schools had confidence in their technical skills, other they faced other obstacles, including larger numbers of English language learners and at-risk students, larger numbers of students with limited computer experience, and greater pressure to increase test scores and adhere to policy mandates.

Other structural inequalities in access to technology exist in differences in the ratio of students to computers within public schools. Correlations show that as the number of minorities enrolled in a school increase so, too, does the ratio of students to computers, 4.0:1 in schools with 50% or more minority enrollment versus 3.1 in schools with 6% or less minority enrollment (as cited in Warschauer, 2010, p. 188-189). Within school structures, low-socioeconomic status (SES) schools tended to have less stable teaching staff, administrative staff, and IT support staff, which contributed to teachers being less likely to incorporate technology in their curriculum for lack of support.

== Disabilities ==
The challenge of the new millennium will include a realignment in focus to include "the curriculum as disabled, rather than students, their insights in translating principles of universal design, which originated in architecture, to education commensurate with advances characterized as a major paradigm shift."

According to the Individuals with Disabilities Education Act (IDEA), children with disabilities have the right to a free appropriate public education in the Least Restrictive Environment (LRE). The LRE means that children with disabilities must be educated in regular classrooms with their non-disabled peers with the appropriate supports and services.

An individual with a disability is also protected under American with Disabilities Act (ADA) which is defined as any person who has a physical or mental impairment that substantially limits one or more major life activities. Assistive technology which supports individuals with disabilities covering a wide range of areas from cognitive to physical limitations, plays an important role.

== School finance ==
School finance is another area where social injustice and inequality might exist. Districts in wealthier areas typically receive more Average Daily Attendance (ADA) funds for total (e.g. restricted and unrestricted) expenditures per pupil than socio-economically disadvantaged districts, therefore, a wealthier school district will receive more funding than a socio-economically disadvantaged school district. "Most U.S. schools are underfunded. Schools in low wealth states and districts are especially hard hit, with inadequate instructional materials, little technology, unsafe buildings, and less-qualified teachers" (p. 31) The method in which funds are distributed or allocated within a school district can also be of concern. De facto segregation can occur in districts or educational organizations that passively promote racial segregation. Epstein (2006) stated the "Two years after the victorious Supreme Court decision against segregation, Oakland's"... "school board increased Oakland's segregation by spending $40 million from a bond election to build..." a "... High School, and then establishing a ten-mile long, two-mile wide attendance boundary, which effectively excluded almost every black and Latino student in the city" (p. 28).

== History of state funding in U.S education ==
Since the early 19th Century policymakers have developed a plethora of educational programs, each with its own particular structural inequality. The mechanisms involved in the allocation of state funding have changed significantly over time. In the past, public schools were primarily funded by property taxes. Funding was supplemented by other state sources. In the early 19th century, policymakers recognized districts relying on property tax could lead to significant disparities in the amount of funding per student.

Thus, policymakers began to analyze the elements of disparity and sought means to address it, numbers of teachers, quality of facilities and materials. To address disparity some states implemented Flat Grants, which typically allocate funding based on the number of teachers. However, this often magnified the disparity, since wealthy communities would have fewer students per teacher.

In their attempt to reduce disparity policymakers in 1920 designed what they call the Foundation Program. The stated purpose was to equalize per-pupil revenue across districts. The goal was achieved by setting a target per-pupil revenue level, and the state supplying funding to equalize revenue in underserved districts. Some analyst characterized the program as a hoax because its structure allowed wealthier districts to exceed the target per-pupil revenue level.

Also in order to aid persons with categories of issues, policymakers designed Categorical Programs. The purpose of these programs are to target disparity in poor districts, which do not take into account district wealth. Overtime, policymakers began to allocate funding that takes into consideration pupil needs along with the wealth of the district.

== Healthcare ==
An identified inequality that negatively affects health and wellness among minority races is highly correlated with income, wealth, social capital, and, indirectly, education. Researchers have been able to identify significant gaps that exist in mortality rates of African Americans and Caucasian Americans. There has not been significant changes in the major factors of income, wealth, social capital/psycho-social environment, and socioeconomic status, that positively impact the existing inequality. Studies have noted significant correlations between these factors and major health issues. For example, poor socioeconomic status is strongly correlated with cardiovascular disease.

== Social inequalities ==
When discussing the issue of structural inequality we must also consider how hegemonic social structures can support institutional and technological inequalities. In the realm of education studies have suggested that the level of educational attainment for a parent will influence the levels of educational attainment for said parents child. The level of education which one receives also tends to be correlated with social capital, income, and criminal activity as well. These findings suggest that by simply being the child of someone who is well educated places the child in an advantageous position. This in turn means that the children of new migrants and other groups who have historically been less educated and have significantly less resources at their disposal will be less likely to achieve higher levels of education. Because education plays a role in income, social capital, criminal activity and even the educational attainment of others it becomes possible that a positive feedback loop where the lack of education will perpetuate itself throughout a social class or group.

The outcomes can be highly problematic at the K-12 level as well. Looking back to school funding we see that when the majority of funding has to come from local school districts and this leads to poorer districts being less adequately funded than wealthier districts. This means that the children who attend these schools which will struggle to provide a quality education with fewer students per teacher, less access to technology and tend to be unable to prepare students for selecting and attending college or university. When these students who were unprepared to attend higher education fail to do so they are less likely to encourage their own children to pursue higher education and more likely to be poorer. Then these individuals will live in traditionally poorer neighborhoods, thus sending their children to underfunded schools ill-prepared to gear students towards higher education and further perpetuate a cycle of poor districts and disadvantaged social groups.

== Historical ==
The structural inequality of tracking in the educational system is the foundation of the inequalities instituted in other social and organizational structures. Tracking is a term in the educational vernacular that determines where students will be placed during their secondary school years. Traditionally, the most tracked subjects are math and English. Students are categorized into different groups based on their standardized test scores. Tracking is justified by the following four assumptions:

1. Students learn better in an academically equal group.
2. Positive self-attitudes are developed in homogenous groups, especially for slower students that do not have a high rate of ability differences.
3. Fair and accurate group placement is appropriate for future learning based on individual past performance and ability.
4. Homogenous groups ease the teaching process.

Race, ethnicity, and socio-economic class limits exposure to advanced academic knowledge thus limiting advanced educational opportunities. A disproportionate number of minority students are placed in low track courses. The content of low track courses are markedly different. Low and average track students typically have limited exposure to "high-status" academic material, thus, the possibility of academic achievement and subsequent success is significantly limited. The tracking phenomenon in schools tends to perpetuate prejudices, misconceptions, and inequalities of the poor and minority people in society. Schools provide both an education and a setting for students to develop into adults, form future societal roles, and maintain social and organizational structures of society. Tracking in the public educational system parallels the hierarchical social and economic structures in society. Schools have a unique acculturative process that helps to pattern self-perceptions and world views. The expectations of the teachers and information taught differ based on tracks. Thus, dissimilar classroom cultures, different dissemination of knowledge, and unequal education opportunities are created.

The cycle of academic tracking and oppression of minority races is dependent on the use of standardized testing. IQ tests are frequently the foundation that determines an individual's group placement. However, accuracy of IQ tests has been found by research to be flawed. Tests, by design, only indicate a student's placement along a high to low continuum and not their actual achievement. The tests have also been found to be culturally biased, therefore, language and experience differences affects test outcomes with lower-class and minority children consistently having lower scores. This leads to inaccurate judgements of students' abilities.

Standardized tests were developed by eugenicists to determine who would best fill societal roles and professions. Tests were originally designed to verify the intellectuals of British society. This original intent unconsciously began the sorting dynamic. Tests were used to assist societies to fill important roles. In America, standardized tests were designed to sort students based on responses to test questions that were and are racially biased. These tests do not factor in the experiential and cultural knowledge or general ability of the students. Students are placed in vocational, general, or academic tracks based on test scores. Students' futures are determined by tracks and they are viewed and treated differently according to their individual track. Tracks are hierarchical in nature and create, consciously for some and unconsciously for others, the damaging effects of labeling students as fast or slow; bright or special education; average or below average.

Corporate America has an interest in maintaining the use of standardized tests in public school systems thus protecting their potential future workforce that will be derived from the high-tracked, successful high income students by eliminating, through poor academic achievement, a disproportionate number of minority students. Also, standardized testing is big business. Although it is often argued that standardized testing is an economical method to evaluate students, the real cost is staggering, estimated at $20 billion annually in indirect and direct costs, an amount that does not factor in the social and emotional costs.

Standardized tests remain a frequently used and expected evaluative method for a variety of reasons. The American culture is interested in intelligence and potential. Standardized testing also provides an economic advantage to some stakeholders, such as prestigious universities, that use standardized test numbers as part of their marketing plan. Finally, standardized testing maintains the status quo of the established social system.

Teacher and counselor judgements have been shown to be just as inaccurate as standardized tests. Teachers and counselors may have a large number of students for which they are responsible for analyzing and making recommendations. Research has found that factors such as appearance, language, behavior, grooming, as well as academic potential, are all considered in the analysis and decision on group placement. This leads to a disproportionate number of lower and minority children placed unfairly into lower track groups.

Teacher diversity is limited by policies that create often-unattainable requirements for bilingual instructors. For example, bilingual instructors may be unable to pass basic educational skills tests because of the inability to write rapidly enough to complete the essay portions of the tests. Limiting resources, in the form of providing primarily English speaking teachers, for bilingual or English as a second language student, limits the learning simply by restricting dissemination of knowledge. Restructuring the educational system, as well as, encouraging prospective bilingual teachers are two of the ways to ensure diversity among the teaching workforce, increase the distribution of knowledge, and increase the potential and continued academic success of minority students.

Possible solutions to tracking and standardized testing:

- Legal action against standardized test based on discrimination against poor and minority students based on precedent set in the state of Massachusetts.
- Curricula designed as age, culture, and language appropriate.
- Recruit and train a diverse and highly skilled, culturally competent teaching force.
- Elimination of norm-referenced testing.
- Community constructed and culture appropriate assessment tests..
- Explore critical race theory within the educational system to identify how race and racism is a part of the structural inequality of the public school system.
- Create alternative teacher education certification programs that allow teachers to work while earning credentials.
