= List of organizations for women in science =

This is a list of notable organizations for women in science and, more generally; science, technology, engineering, and math.

== General STEM-oriented groups ==
International groups who cover the general topics of science, technology, engineering, and math.

- 500 Women Scientists
- American Association of University Women (AAUW)
- AnitaB.org
- Association for Women in Science (AWIS)
- European Platform of Women Scientists
- Girl Geek Dinners
- Graduate Women in Science (GWIS; formerly known as Sigma Delta Epsilon)
- International Network of Women in Engineering and Sciences
- Kovalevskaia Fund
- Laboratoria
- Outreachy
- Organization for Women in Science for the Developing World
- Stemettes
- Systers
- Women in Technology International
- WomenTech Network

== Subject-specific groups ==
International groups who focus on specific topics.

=== Computing and Information Technology ===
- AnitaB.org
- Association for Computing Machinery Committee on Women
- Association for Women in Computing
- BCSWomen, a specialist group of the British Computer Society
- Black Girls Code
- BlogHer
- Center for Women in Technology
- Committee on Widening Participation in Computing Research (CRA-WP)
- DC Web Women
- Django Girls
- Girl Geek Dinners
- Girls Who Code
- Ladies of Code
- LinuxChix
- National Center for Women & Information Technology (NCWIT)
- Native Girls Code
- Portland Women in Technology (PDX WIT)
- Pyladies
- R-Ladies
- Systers
- Tech LadyMafia
- Women in Data
- Women in Technology International

=== Earth & Geosciences ===
- Association for Women Geoscientists
- Society of Woman Geographers

=== Engineering ===
- Society of Women Engineers (US)
- Women's Engineering Society (UK)

=== Biomechanics ===
- International Women in Biomechanics

=== Mathematics ===
- African Women in Mathematics Association
- Association for Women in Mathematics
- European Women in Mathematics
- Femmes et Mathématiques

=== Medical sciences ===
- American Association for Women in Radiology
- American Medical Women's Association
- Association of Women Surgeons
- Kappa Epsilon (founded 1921 to promote woman pharmacists)
- Medical Women's International Association (est. 1919)
- National Association of Women Pharmacists

=== Physics ===
- Working Group on Women in Physics

=== Sociology ===
- Sociologists for Women in Society

=== Statistics ===
- Caucus for Women in Statistics

== Location-specific organizations ==
=== Africa ===
==== Rwanda ====
- Starlight Africa

==== Nigeria ====
- Medical Women's Association of Nigeria
- Women's Technology Empowerment Centre

==== South Africa ====
- Women'sNet (South African support for women activists using technology)

==== Uganda ====
- WOUGNET (Women of Uganda Network)

=== Asia ===
==== Philippines ====
- WomensHub (Philippines support for women activists using technology)

==== Taiwan ====
- Taiwan Women in Science and Technology
- Women in HPC Taiwan Chapter
- Taiwan Outstanding Women in Science Awards
- Ministry of Education STEM & Women Researcher Programs

=== Europe ===
- European Platform of Women Scientists

==== Ireland ====
- Teen Turn
- Women in Technology and Science

==== United Kingdom ====
- BCSWomen
- GlamSci (organization)
- WISE Campaign

===== Scotland =====
- Equate Scotland
- Girl Geek Scotland

=== North America ===
==== United States ====
- American Association of University Women (AAUW; founded 1881)
- Association for Women in Science (AWIS)
- Girl Develop It

===== California =====
- San Francisco Women on the Web

===== Nevada =====
- The Diana Initiative

===== Washington, D.C. =====
- DC Web Women

=== Pacific ===
==== Australia ====
- Victorian Medical Women's Society

== Inactive organizations ==
- Ada Initiative (closed 2015)
- Women Who Code (closed in 2024)
- WorldWIT (closed in 2007)

== Events ==
- ACM-W
- African Summit on Women and Girls in Technology

== See also ==
- African-American women in computer science
- African women in engineering
- American Association of University Women
- Diversity in computing
- Gender disparity in computing
- History of women in engineering
- History of women in engineering in the United Kingdom
- Index of women scientists articles
- International Day of Women and Girls in Science
- List of female Nobel laureates
- List of female scientists before the 20th century
- List of female scientists in the 21st century
- List of female scientists in the 20th century
- List of prizes, medals, and awards for women in science
- List of African-American women in STEM fields
- List of inventions and discoveries by women
- List of women's organizations
- List of women in mathematics
- Matilda effect
- Occupational sexism
- STEM pipeline
- Structural inequality in education
- Timeline of women in science
- Timeline of women in science in the United States
- UKRC
- Women in archaeology
- Women in climate change
- Women in chemistry
- Women in computing
- Women in engineering
- Women in engineering in the United States
- Women in medicine
- Women in physics
- Women in science
- Women in STEM fields
- Women in the workforce
