= Gender disparity in computing =

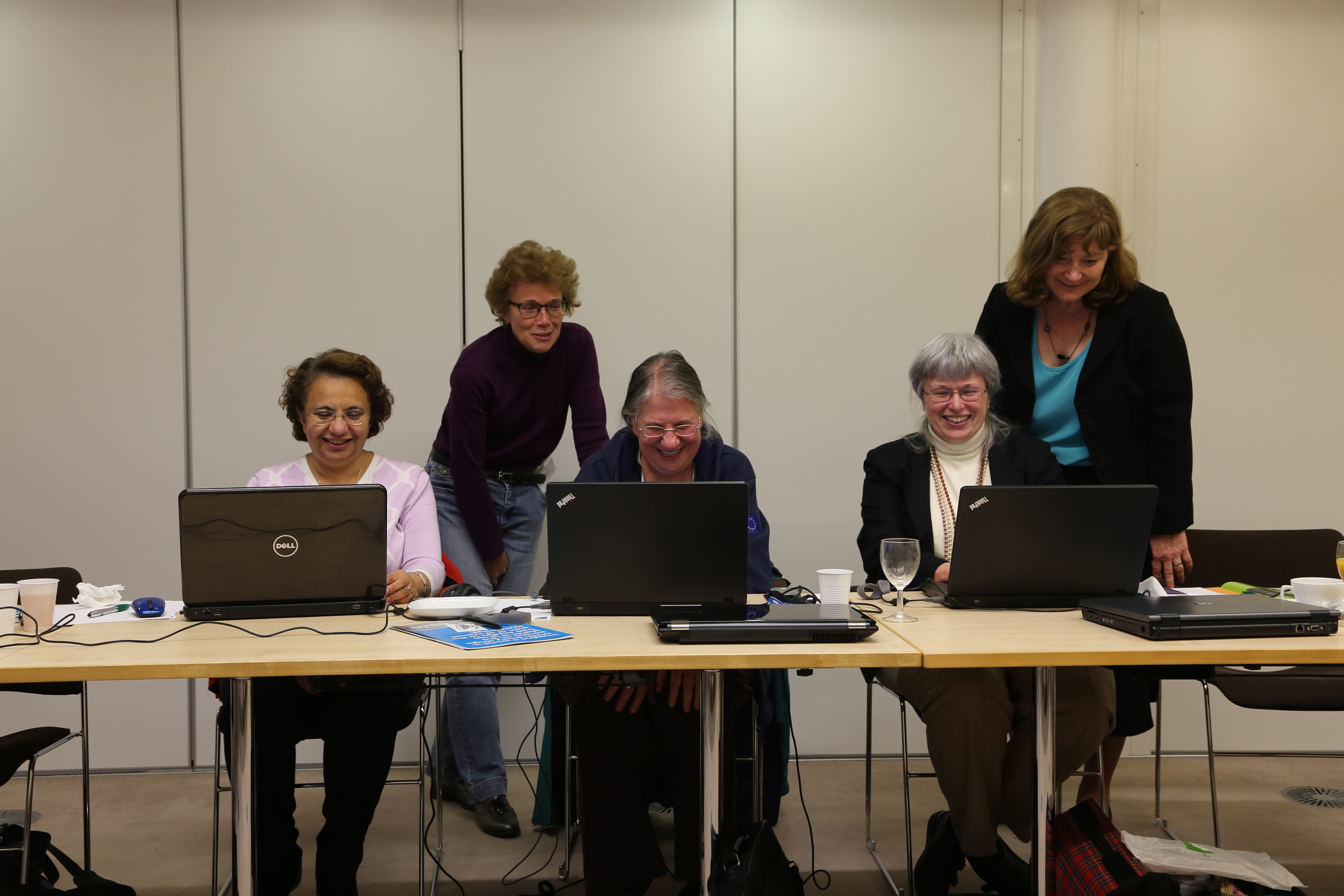
Women attending the British Computer Society Women Wikipedia editathon at BCS London.

Gender disparity in computing concerns the disparity between the number of men in the field of computing in relation to the lack of women in the field. Originally, computing was seen as a female occupation. As the field evolved, the demographics changed, and the gender gap shifted from female dominated to male dominated. The believed need for more diversity and an equal gender gap has led to public policy debates regarding gender equality. Many organizations have sought to create initiatives to bring more women into the field of computing.

== Background ==
In the early days of computers and computing, managers readily hired women as programming was seen as a low-skilled clerical occupation, similar to telephone operators and typists. They often worked as human computers, making complicated calculations and working in large groups, such as the Harvard Computers. They also worked on ballistic calculations and cryptography. However, since 1843 women have been making contributions to computer science when Charles Babbage hired Ada Lovelace as an assistant. Lovelace went on to write one of history's earliest computer programs. Joan Clarke was also one such woman who made immense contributions to computing during World War II. She was a British mathematician and codebreaker who worked at Bletchley Park on breaking codes generated by Enigma machines, eventually developing Alan Turing's bombe technology to aid in deciphering complex Nazi messages. Despite her significant contributions to cybersecurity, Clarke's accomplishments were largely ignored until recently. She died in 1986 but in 2013, was posthumously awarded an OBE (Order of the British Empire) for her work as a cryptanalyst. In 1946, the University of Pennsylvania's Moore School of Electrical engineering and the United States Army Ballistics Research Laboratory began to research the trajectories of projectiles. However, there were only two hundred women involved in this research. Additionally, due to the lack of labor resources during the Second World War, women were actively recruited into computing jobs. The early programmers on machines such as ENIAC were mostly women., an example being the six women who designed the public demonstrations and prepared ENIAC for its public debut.

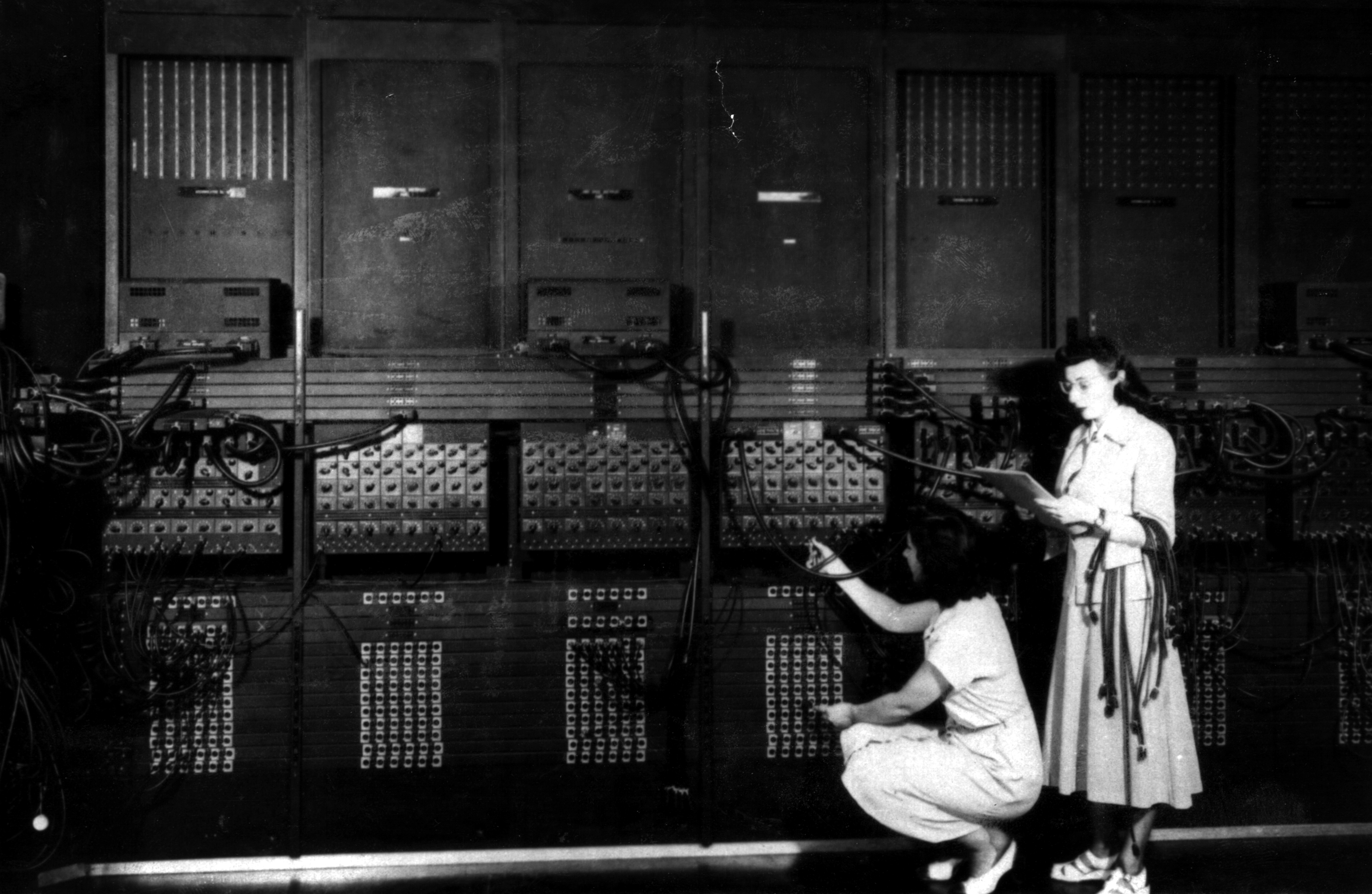
Two women reprogram the ENIAC.

Computer science was the fastest-growing college major and STEM discipline amongst women from the 1970s until the 1980s. According to the National Science Foundation's report on women receiving a Bachelor of Science degree, computer science is the only STEM discipline facing a downward slope after its peak in 1984, according to a report by the National Center for Women and Information Technology (NWCIT), which found that 37% of computer science undergraduate students were female that year, and has since shrunk to 18% as of 2018. Between this time, there was another wave of interest in computer science in the mid-1990s, but it was mainly men who were a part of this. There was a slight increase in women in computer science from the 2000s to the 2010s, as around 12% of computer science majors were women in the mid-2000s. Bumble co-founder Alex Williamson has claimed that "While some young girls show interest in coding and computer-related areas at an early age, they are pushed out of those areas the ages of 13-17. The reasons range from peer pressure to a lack of role models and support to a general misperception of what STEM careers look like in the real world."

In a 2015 study across undergraduate students in computer science on gender and race identified factors over time that have contributed to the gender disparity in computing. One reason was the students' perception in their math ability, as women tended to rate themselves to be lower in mathematical skills in comparison to their male counterparts. However, the salience of this factor has decreased over time.

According to Janet Abbate, the work that the ENIAC women did during World War II was considered menial because of preconceived gender notions. These women were not allowed to develop hardware, so it became associated as a man's job. Additionally, software development was new, and women chose to work in this field because they had prior experience as 'human computers.' However, many computer science programs, including Princeton, wouldn't admit women into their program.

== Gender gap ==
A survey conducted by SWIFT, Supporting Women in Information Technology, based in Vancouver, Canada, asked 7,411 participants questions about their career choices. The survey found that females are less interested in computer science than males. From 1971 to 2011, survey data was collected to document trends from majors in computer science, discover individualities of both males and females who selected computer science as their majors, and identify the cause of gender gaps. A key timeline between the 1990s to 2011 revealed a significantly low representation of women. In general, women who pursued a computer science degree felt less confident than males when using a computer. This study shows that male students have more confidence than females in the computing field.

The Project "Strategies of Inclusion: Gender and the Information Society" released its findings based on research conducted in 48 separate case studies all over Europe. The results focus on recruiting as well as retention techniques for women already in the field. These techniques range from the introduction of role models, advertisement campaigns, and the allocation of quotas. The purpose of these techniques are to make the computing field more gender-neutral.

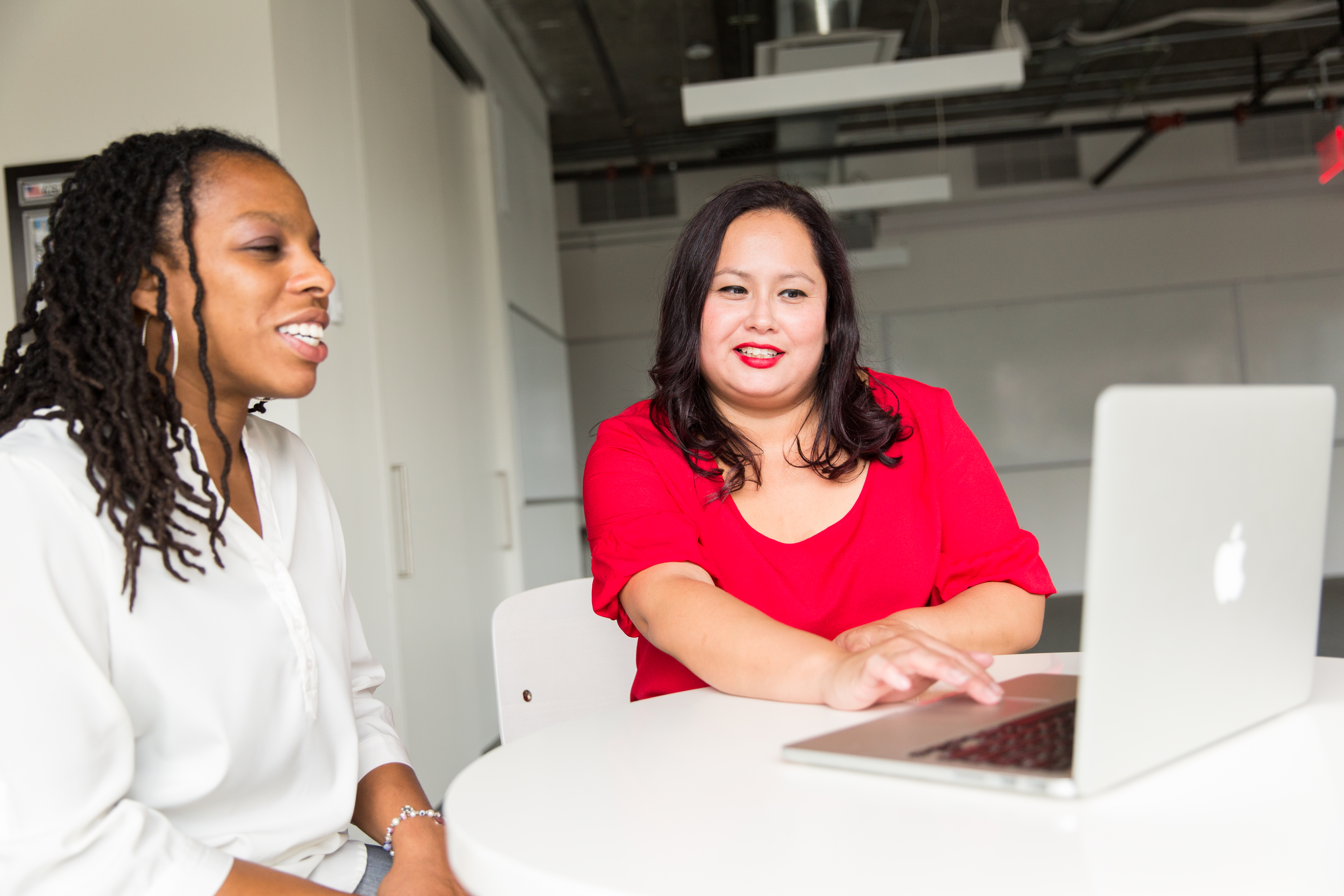
Two women working in the technology field

Research suggests that Malaysia has an equal split that varies around the halfway mark. A job in the computing industry also implies a safe work environment. There was a strong belief by the previous generation that IT would be a flourishing sector with many job opportunities. This caused parents to encourage their children to major in computing, no matter their gender.

In India, a growing number of women are studying and taking careers in technology fields. The percentage of women engineers graduating from IIT Bombay grew from 1.8% in 1972 to 8% in 2005. Additionally, in 2014, Arab women made up 59% of all the students enrolled in computer science at government universities located in Saudi Arabia. The women in Eastern Europe, especially in Bulgaria and Romania, have high coding and technology rates. However, women remain underrepresented in technology fields all around the world.

Based on recent research involving the gender gap in computer science, a significant contribution comes from families. Additionally, other contributions come from friends and classmates. These contributions encourage women to continue their studies in computer science. However, a lack of support can weaken a women's pledge to the field. For example, when circumstances in the department are adverse, those with frail assurance leave at a higher rate than those with adequate support. This happens because faculty can discourage women with unintentional comments or the expectation that a man's knowledge is the basis of success in computer science (Cohoon, 2002).

=== Statistics in education ===
In the United States, the proportion of women represented in the computer science field peaked around the mid-1980s and has declined ever since. In 1984, 37.1% of Computer Science degrees were awarded to women. However, this percentage dropped to 29.9% in 1990 and 26.7% in 1998. Data from the Computing Research Association indicates that fewer than 12% of computer science bachelor's degrees were awarded to women at U.S. PhD-granting institutions in 2011. Additionally, the percentage of women earning a master's degree peaked around 33% in 2000 but dropped to 27% in 2008. International studies of ICT tertiary education note several countries where women outnumber men, with these countries more likely to be less gender equal than those with fewer women taking ICT courses. UNESCO termed this disparity the "ICT Gender Equality Paradox", where in more gender equal countries women were less likely to study computing and related courses.

Within the United States, the representation of women in the computing field has declined over the past thirty years. As of 2018, women made up 18% of undergraduates in computer science majors. In the study, "Anatomy of an Enduring Gender Gap: The Evolution of Women's Participation in Computer Science,"researchers found an overall decline in women's determination to major in the computer science field. They found that by 2011 only 0.4% of women planned to major in computer science compared to 3.3% of men. The study also found that 15% of computer science majors were women.

Although teenage girls are using computers and the internet at rates similar to their male peers, they are five times less likely to consider a technology-related career or take post-secondary technology classes. The National Center for Women & Information Technology (NCWIT) reports that of the SAT takers who intend to major in computer science, the proportion of girls has steadily decreased from 20 percent in 2001 to 12 percent in 2006.

According to a College Board report in 2006, there were slightly more girls than boys who reported having "course work or experience" in computer literacy, word processing, internet activity, and creating spreadsheets. It was also determined that more boys than girls, 59% vs. 41%, reported course work or experience with computer programming, although this may be caused by false reporting. Of the 146,437 students who reported having no course work or experience, 61% were girls, and 39% were boys.

In 2006, 2,594 girls and 12,068 boys took the AP Computer Science A exam, while 517 girls and 4,422 boys took the more advanced AP Computer Science AB exam. From 1996 to 2004, girls made up 17% of those taking the AP Computer Science A exam and around 10% of those taking the AP Computer Science AB exam.

In England, females made up 20% of GCSE and 10% of A-level computer science cohorts in 2019. Additionally, they outperformed males at GCSE computer science, but when controlling for their achievement in other subjects, i.e. attempting to compare males and females of similar grade profiles, males achieved significantly higher grades in computer science. Across all UK universities, females earned significantly fewer first-class degrees than males, a pattern not seen in other degree areas.

To more fully understand the areas of need in regards to education, there needs to be more intersectional CS education research, as current intersectional research pertains to STEM and CS education research examines demographic factors individually.

=== Statistics in the workforce ===
Women's representation in the computing field has fallen from its peak of 38% in the mid-1980s. From 1993 to 1999, NSF's SESTAT reported that the percentage of women working as computer scientists declined slightly from 33.1% to 29.6%, while the absolute numbers increased from 170,500 to 185,000. Additionally, data from the Bureau of Labor Statistics and Catalyst in 2006 indicated that women make up 29% of the computer science field.

In a 2022 article on intersectional disparities in education and the workplace, gender was identified to be a strong predictor in earnings in the first five years after graduation. This is attributed to the underrepresentation of women in CS education, as this disparity on the education level can reflect how CS education disproportionately benefits people across differences of gender, race, etc.

== Benefits of gender diversity ==
A gender-diverse team is more likely to create products that meet people's requirements. When women are underrepresented, many technical decisions are made based on a man's experiences, opinions, and judgment, resulting in a male-slanted bias. In addition, a review of research on gender-diverse teams reveals that gender-diverse groups are more productive, more creative, and more capable of staying on track than homogenous teams. However, another research review suggests that the results are mixed, with many studies showing no result, non-linear results, or even negative results of gender diversity.

The book Gender and Computers: Understanding the Digital Divide states that the lack of participation of females in computing excludes them from the "new economy," which calls for sophisticated computer skills in exchange for high salary positions.

In an article titled "Diversity in Computing: Why It Matters and How Organizations Can Achieve It,"Wendy DuBow looked into the benefits of gender diversity in computing. In the article, DuBow found that there is missed potential when a workforce is not diverse. She also found that having a diverse team in culture, gender, and race allows for more creativity, innovation, and productivity.

The study "Innovative Potential: Men and Women in Teams," produced by The Lehman Brothers Centre for Women in Business and the London Business School, found that teams with equal gender membership were more efficient in their goals.

Gender diversity helps encourage individuals to continue and achieve in computing, as having relatable individuals around them may help them feel more comfortable and inspired. Gender diversity must not be thought of as a male/female binary; the experiences of trans and gender non-conforming are important and different in their own ways.

Furthermore, gender diversity among technology developers is crucial to ensuring that technology is developed to account for various groups of people. The lack of gender diversity in technology has resulted in gender bias in technology to discriminate against women, such as in Joy Buolamwini's research on facial recognition across gender and race. Buolawmini's research found that darker-skinned women's faces had up to 34.7% error rates, while the maximum error rate for white men was 0.8%. Thus, gender diversity is needed to create technology that can accurately serve people across different genders.

== Factors contributing to lack of female participation ==
=== Education ===
Diminished participation by women relative to men in computer science dates from about 1984 following mass marketing of personal computers to boys as toys to play games. This resulted in increased interest and readiness for computer science classes for more young men than young women because mass marketing did not appeal to young women. Women who did not have that exposure to computers at a young age are more likely to pursue a career other than computing due to lack of confidence in their abilities.

In a 2015 study across undergraduate students in computer science on gender and race identified factors over time that have contributed to the gender disparity in computing. One reason was the students' perception in their math ability, as women tended to rate themselves to be lower in mathematical skills in comparison to their male counterparts. However, the salience of this factor has decreased over time. Focusing on factors that proceed women pursuing computer science on a university level is also needed—A 2022 study found that influential factors for women pursuing postsecondary education include experience with computing, information sciences, and math experiences throughout secondary education, reflecting that efforts to include and support women in secondary education in these areas is needed to help women join computing overall.

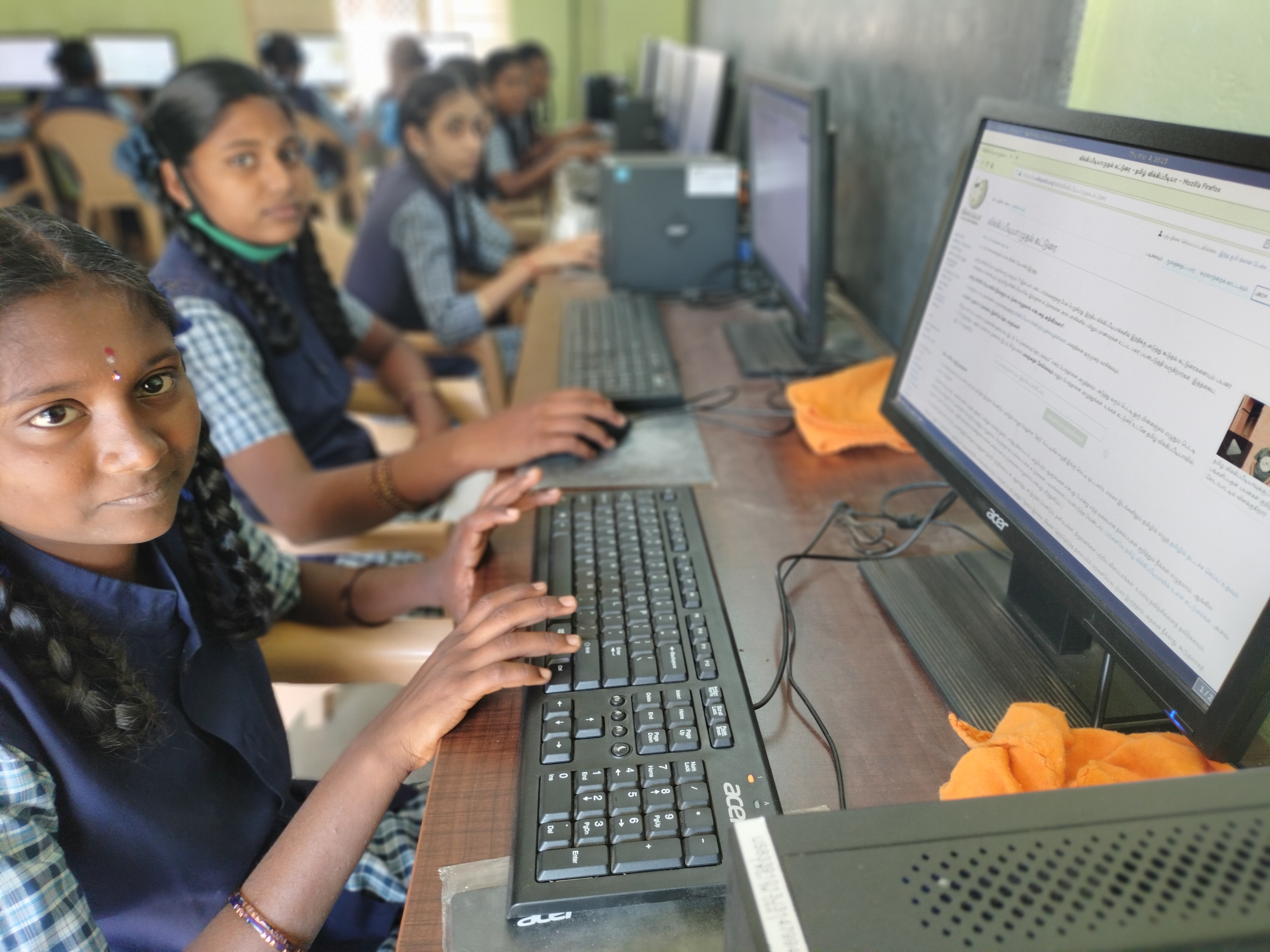
A group of girls working on computers at school

A study of over 7000 high school students in Vancouver, British Columbia, Canada showed that the degree of interest in the field of computer science for young women is comparably lower than that of young men. The same effect is seen in higher education; for instance, only 4% of female college freshmen expressed intention to major in computer science in the US. Research has shown that some aspects about computing may discourage women. One of the biggest turn-offs is the "geek factor". High school girls often envisage a career in computing as a lifetime in an isolated cubicle writing code. The "geek factor" affects both male and female high school students, but it seems to have more of a negative effect on the female students. In addition, computer programmers depicted in popular media are overwhelmingly male, contributing to an absence of role models for would-be female computer programmers. However, in 2015, computer science has for the first time become the most popular major for female students at Stanford University.

In part to qualify for federal education funding distributed through the states, most U.S. states and districts now focus on ensuring that all students are at least "proficient" in mathematics and reading, making it difficult for teachers to focus on teaching concepts beyond the test. According to a Rand Corporation study, such a concentration on testing can cause administrators to focus resources on tested subjects at the expense of other subjects (e.g., science) or distract their attention from other needs. Thus, computational thinking is unlikely to be taught either standalone or as integrated into other areas of study (e.g., mathematics, biology) anytime in the near future. The National Center for Women & IT distributes free resources for increasing awareness of the need for teaching computer science in schools, including the "Talking Points" card, "Moving Beyond Computer Literacy: Why Schools Should Teach Computer Science".

In 2014, Kelly Ward, Cornelia Dragne, and Angelina J Lucas conducted a study in Romania that examined gender disparity in computing. The article features statistics of female enrollment in computing programs at Romanian universities. The main topics of the article are representation, equality vs. equity, and the masculine image of computing and how it affects opportunities for women.

=== Female and male perspectives ===
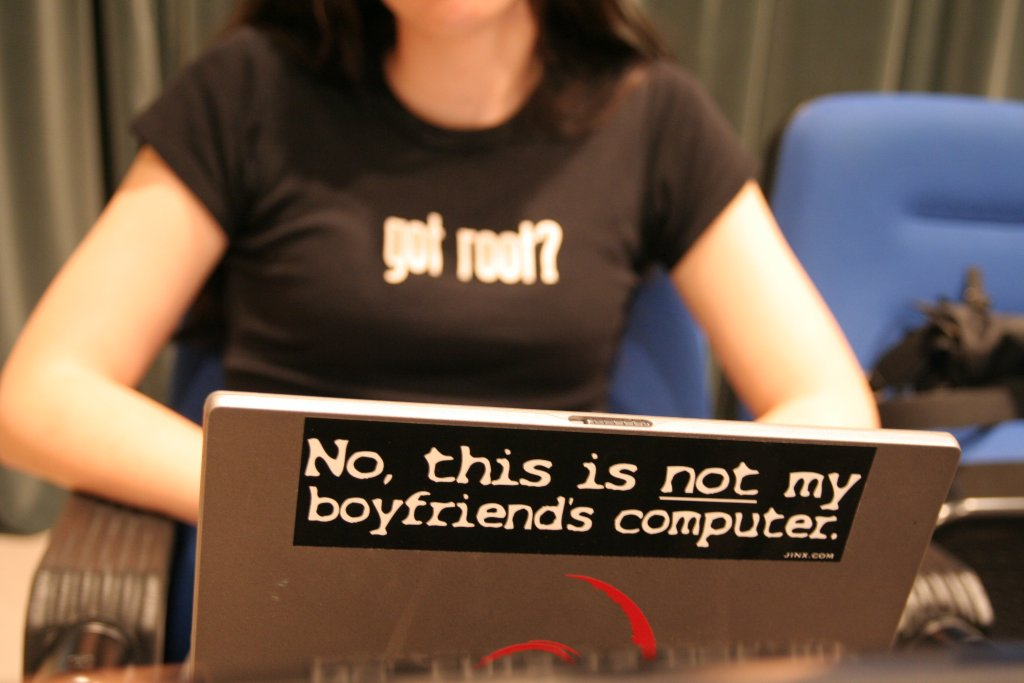
A woman sitting down, while using her computer. The sticker reads, "No, this is not my boyfriend's computer."

==== Among children ====
A two-year research initiative published in 2000 by AAUW found that "Girls approach the computer as a "tool" useful primarily for what it can do; boys more often view the computer as a "toy" and/or an extension of the self. For boys, the computer is inherently interesting. Girls are interested in its instrumental possibilities, which may include its use as an artistic medium. They express scorn toward boys who confuse "real" power and power on a screen. "I see a computer as a tool," a high school girl declares. "You [might] go play Kung Fu Fighting, but in real life you are still a stupid little person living in a suburban way." Still, the National Assessment of Educational Progress showed as far back as 2000 that boys and girls use computers at about the same rates, albeit for somewhat different purposes.

==== Across college students ====
Nearly 1000 students in University of Akron were surveyed, and it was discovered that females hold a more negative attitude towards computers than males. Another study assessed the computer-related attitude of over 300 students in University of Winnipeg and obtained similar results.

This is thought to contribute to the gender disparity phenomenon in computing, in particular the females' early lack of interest in the field.

In a chapter on cultural perspectives to gender diversity in computing, reasons as to why women join or do not join computing are very related to the field's environment and how it is perceived, as opposed to gender itself; gender can be thought of as a cultural topic. To help more women and underrepresented people join computing, it is important to develop a culture or subcultures that better account for women and the experiences of minorities. Culture refers to the values, relationships, behaviors, and attitudes that are shared across a group of people, and it shapes those in a certain culture and thus serves as spaces to create change and intervene. A case study of women and men in CS at Carnegie Mellon University in the mid-1990s found that women and men tended to have different attitudes toward computing—women wanted to be productive with computer science, and men were more interested in computer science itself. It was also learned that women had significantly lower confidence when it came to computer science, and felt that they did not fit into the computer science community.

In the fall of 1999, the computer science department put more emphasis on breadth and leadership skills as opposed to previous coding experience, allowing for more women and diversity in the department. There was also the formation of the women in CS club ("Women@SCS"), which helped build community among women in CS and increase the resources and network for women in the department. In the following years, surveys on confidence levels and perspectives in programming showed that women feel more positively about programming and their personal interests and skills. A sense of belonging in computer science among women in CS helped them arrive at these attitudes, as they felt that they had people with "similar mindsets", others to reach out to for help, and increased comfort in taking on leadership roles. The study also advocates for moving beyond a gender difference model, as it perpetuates stereotypes about women. It encourages "cross-gender" perspectives across men and women to account for the nuances across various genders in computer science.

==== Geek culture ====
Geek culture has led to an underrepresentation of women in computing especially when it comes to people of color and people from low-income backgrounds. In relation to computing, "geek culture" is characterized by people who have a deep interest and understanding in computing and tend to be socially awkward and prefer spending time with technology over socializing with people "Geek" is also synonymous to "hacker" and "nerd". The geek archetype is seen as white and masculine, and thus projects an ideal of who drives and succeeds in computing—white men. When it comes to women, the impact of geek culture may begin as early as middle school, with surveys of girls in middle and high school finding that they believe computing to be an "isolating" field. Furthermore, the impact of geek culture contributing to the dominance of men in computing has led to women facing more intimidating classroom environments and a lack of resources for women in education and the workforce.

According to a 1998–2000 ethnographic study by Jane Margolis and Allan Fisher at Carnegie Mellon University, men and women viewed computers very differently. Women interviewees were more likely to state that they saw the computer as a tool for use within a larger societal and/or interdisciplinary context than did the men interviewed. On the other hand, men were more likely to express an interest in the computer as a machine. Moreover, women interviewed in this study perceived that many of their male peers were "geeks," with limited social skills. Females often disliked the idea that computers "become their life." The students observed and interviewed in that study were probably not representative of students in general, since at that time, in order to be admitted to CMU Computer Science a student needed to have some programming experience. More research is needed to understand the ability to generalize Margolis' and Fisher's findings.

=== Barriers to advancement ===
Measures like experience, aptitude tests, and college degrees were used by companies to hire people for the job in the 1960s and onwards. The requirement of college degrees was not helpful for women to get a job. Many did not either think of pursuing further studies because of the societal expectation that women should be married and raise children. Not having adequate resources to attain a four-year degree also played a factor in not furthering their education.

When word processors came into being in the 1980s, job titles and duties had to be reorganized. With more advanced machines to learn and use, receiving a college education became a must for prospective workers to be considered for a position. This left out women who weren't as educated or possessed enough money to afford higher education.

Research on the barriers that women face in undergraduate computing has highlighted such factors as:

- Undergraduate classroom teaching in which the "weedout" practices and policies privileging competition over cooperation tend to advantage men.
- Laboratory climates in which women are seen as foreign and not belonging at best, and experience blatant hostility and sexism at worst.
- Well-meaning people who unwittingly create stereotype threat by reminding students that "women can do computing as well as men".
- Strong resistance to changing the system in which these and other subtle practices are continuously reproduced.

Just like in the pre-college situation, solutions are most often implemented outside of the mainstream (e.g., providing role models, mentoring, and women's groups), which can also create the perception among women, their male peers, and their professors that to be successful, women need "extra help" to graduate. Most people do not realize that the "extra help" is not academic, but instead access to the kind of peer networks more readily available to male students. Many women decline to participate in these extracurricular support groups because they do not want to appear deficient. In short, the conditions under which women (and underrepresented minority students) study computing are not the same as those experienced by men.

A method to address the gender disparity in computing in the workplace is having more diverse leadership, an investment to grow the communities of underrepresented people, and incorporating more women (particularly women of color) into the workplace. Oftentimes, "diversity" has been understood as incorporating more women, but it is necessary to account for the intersectional disparities within women and minorities to better understand how to better represent them.

=== Lack of acknowledgment and promotion of skills ===
The need for experience helped women a lot better than the requirement of a college degree. They had more chances of gaining experience at a workplace than attaining a college degree. Aptitude tests were also a measure used by companies to determine who had the skills necessary for the job. It also made it easier for women to land jobs in the computing field because of its nature of objectivity, but it did not necessarily mean better treatment of women than men in the field.

Societal and institutional assumptions of what gender and its capabilities were, were most likely to influence the positions of the women in the workplace then. As it changed over time, so did what women were capable of doing. The marriage bar and assumptions that women would not stay in the workplace for long after marriage became reasons for companies to deny promotions and increased salaries to women. With the advancement of technology, the complexity of the jobs also rose. This led to many women being unable to pursue those jobs as the companies handed them over to men. Pre-conceived notions of the abilities of men and women affected these decisions.

Grace Hopper Celebration Attendee

The "leaky pipeline" describes the lack of retention of women as roles progress in seniority. Factors behind the "leaky pipeline" are attributed to the white male dominated culture in computing and family responsibilities and care work. Methods to address the leaky pipeline include fall into the categories of policy, pedagogy, support, and promotion/engagement. In regards to policy, admission plans can be more conscious of admitting diverse students, and the recruiting of faculty and employees must be more representative. For pedagogy, changing delivery techniques to encourage more interaction and peer instruction, such as flipped classrooms, can encourage a sense of belonging for women. For support, more mentors and role models are important to helping encourage women along their career pursuits. Mentors can provide specific insights and points of relatability that help with confidence, motivation, and retention. For promotion and engagement, events to incorporate more women in technology, such as career fairs, information events, and conferences (such as the Grace Hopper Celebration of Women in Computing) are important in specifically helping women find opportunities in technology. Furthermore, they are conducive to helping women build community and feel more represented in technology.

Punch-card operations were mostly a woman's job in the second half of the 20th century. The conditions associated with this job - noisy rooms, heavy manual labor, no opportunity for growth, less pay, unfavorable work environments and behaviors - forced many women to eventually leave their jobs. A Harvard Business School report stated that due to negative experiences of keeping up with horrible work conditions, pressure to complete the work on a tight schedule, and dealing with male-dominated behaviors, half of the women joining the workforce left their jobs after working for ten years.

Women in technical roles often feel that the skills and feedback they bring to their jobs are not valued. According to a Catalyst report called "Women in Technology: Maximizing Talent, Minimizing Barriers", 65% of females in technical roles felt that those they reported to were receptive and responsive to their suggestions, as compared to 75% of women in non-technical roles. This also speaks directly to the retention of females in the industry as females will commonly leave a company when they feel that what they are offering a company is not valued. The report shows the concerns felt about this by sharing the following quote from an interviewee: "I would like to be involved with more projects than I am currently involved in; I feel that I am being underutilized. I would prefer my supervisor give me an opportunity to expand my skill sets and my responsibility at work".

However, it is not enough to just acknowledge skills. Women also lack the support and advocacy needed to promote these skills. Women feel alone and at a loss because they lack role models, networks, and mentors. These support systems not only help women develop talent and opportunities for career advancement, but they are also needed to promote women to more senior roles. It can be understood that advocacy is a major player in the advancement of females into senior tech roles.

=== Stereotyping computer scientists ===
Different forms of media played a part in unconsciously discouraging women from entering the computing field in the late 20th century. Advertisements promoted the idea of the women doing the grunt work in computing while the men oversaw the women's work. For example, men were shown to be using the phone while in front of the computer, while women were using the keyboard to do work on the computer. As women slowly became experts in the field, journalists started writing about the fewer number of men who were experts in the field, while writing pieces about women's lack of expertise, shifting the narrative.

Stereotypes that boys are more interested in computer science than girls begin at a young age (as early as first grade). Such stereotypes are referred to as "interest stereotypes", which have implications for academic and career motivations—girls tend to feel more discouraged and less interested in pursuing computer science. Interest stereotypes also paralleled ideas about ability and belonging across girls and boys; a sense of belonging was found to be particularly influential. The self-socialization and identity-forming that accompanies a sense of belonging is foundational to shaping someone's perception of their pursuits. A study of boys and girls from grades 3–7 on gender, race, interest, and computer science ability studied such factors, and found that interest stereotypes contributed to the gender gap in computer science. This study also found that beliefs about interest played a stronger role than beliefs about abilities in driving the students' academic choices. Overall, this study suggests that programs to promote girls' interest in computing and to counter gendered stereotypes would be helpful in addressing the gender disparity in technology.

Other research examines that undergraduates' stereotype of the people in computer science and how changing this stereotype through media can influence women's interest in computer science. Through this study they concluded that the image of computer science majors that is most prevalent in popular culture and in the minds of current undergraduates is someone who is highly intelligent, primarily obsessed with computers, and socially unskilled. This image can be considered to contrast with the more people-oriented, traditionally feminine image. According to this study, students continue to generate and propagate this stereotype when asked to describe people in computer science. Based on the results of their experiment based on this idea, they took a group of women and men undergraduates and had them read a stereotypical article and a non-stereotypical article. They found that women who read the non-stereotypical article were much more interested in computer science than those who read the article with the above-mentioned stereotypical computer science student. Overall, they concluded that the underrepresentation of women in computing is not due to women's lack of interest. The study contests the perception that college major decisions are free choices, instead they discuss the implications that the major decisions are more constrained by the prevalent stereotypes. This has a negative consequence such that it prevents women from developing an interest in these technical fields. The finding suggests that the stereotypical image of the computer scientists is unattractive to women who would otherwise be interested if presented with a true representation or role model from the computer science field.

Racial stereotyping is also an issue, as computer scientists can often be thought of as white or Asian males, which can make it difficult for people who fall outside of those ethnicities to get hired. Non-white or Asian women may experience additional difficulty because they fail to match either half of the stereotype. Nonetheless, it has been found that a women's race is less likely to affect the probability of her choosing computing or a related field.

Some cases that subvert the stereotype of typical people in computing include the person coming from a family that is already involved in computing or a related field. Also, coming from a family of a higher socioeconomic status is correlated to a higher likelihood of women choosing computing or a related field. Yet, many computing companies only search for employees from prestigious schools, which leaves fewer opportunities.

=== Technological advancements and job displacement ===
The ENIAC not only initiated the rapid development of technology, but also the shift of computing work from females to males. Before 1954, MetLife had a large number of women workers in their punch-card division. A majority of women in this division received an annual salary of $3,400 (approximately 55 women) while the highest salary possible was $6,700. After the company converted its punch-card division to a computer division, there were less than 10 women in the division and the highest annual salary possible was $5,400. More men were appointed in the department and the highest salary possible was over $9,000. Many women were assigned to other routine jobs in the department or let go once the transition was made.

The women still working after the transition were mostly appointed in data entry. It continued to be a low-paid, difficult, high-pressure, and time-dependent job that required a lot of accuracy because the machines were only as good as its input. This further added to the stress because if the machines gave inaccurate information, it was assumed that the women were making mistakes in the calculations during the input process. Even though the technological advancements continued well towards the 21st century, an advancement in better opportunities and work environments continued to stay the same, discouraging women to enter or continue in the field.

=== Fraternity-like startup environments ===
The disproportionate number of startups in the computing industry, and the disproportionate hiring of primarily young workers, have created an environment in which many firms' technical teams consist largely of workers who are recent college graduates, sometimes giving the businesses fraternity-like cultures, leading to sexism that discourages female participation. The phenomenon of fraternity-like environments among technology teams of startup firms has been termed brogrammer culture.

=== Psychological differences between genders ===
Some have speculated that women, on aggregate, prefer people-oriented careers, while their male counterparts show a preference for thing-oriented careers. The difference between male and female interests is larger in gender-egalitarian countries than in non gender-egalitarian countries, which suggests the theory that these differences are due to societal roles isn't entirely explanatory. Other work around this, including discussion of the Gender-equality paradox, has shown that this may be a naive interpretation of results, which instead can be explained by the study's methodological choices and confounding factors.

=== Race ===
Race, class, and gender are elements of social structure that create inequality. The intersection of these factors creates varying perspectives. Focusing on just one variable does not serve as the basis of inclusion and diversity. The notion of all women being marginalized in the same way is false, as discrimination in the workplace is not a shared experience. The sole emphasis on gender hides the racial privilege of white women, and middle-class, college-educated women dominate the discourse and promote their interests. While this builds some degree of solidarity, it ignores the legacy of racism in society. The lack of understanding of race with regard to gender-technology relationships explains the underrepresentation of women in technology occupations. For instance, for Black women, there are more barriers when it comes to entering the industry.

A 2021 study identified that women of color are particularly underrepresented: in terms of computer science majors in the United States, 5% are Asian women, 2% are Latina women, and 2% are Black women. A 2022 study found that community college plays a key role in incorporating more women into STEM majors, due to its accessibility and opportunities for upward transfer into higher education and the workforce.

While efforts to broaden participation in computing have led to gender-focused interventions, they have failed to address the disproportionate representation of Black women in the field. In 2018, only 1% of the 28,884 bachelor's degrees in computer science were awarded to them. People have stated that not only is there a lack of Black women in classrooms and technology spaces, but they are also understudied and ignored as research samples in relevant studies. For instance, for Black women, there are more barriers when it comes to entering the industry. For black women that work in the industry, they are less likely to be promoted to an executive position compared to white women. A study by the Ascend foundation shows the number of black professional women in the technology sector declined by 13% from 2007 to 2015. The study also shows that white women had significantly improved by 2015, while similar improvements were not seen for any racial minority group. According to the Kapor Center, only 12% of women in all computing roles are Black. The inequity starts in education, where young girls are discouraged from pursuing STEM degrees. The vast majority of Black women face social isolation when they enter the fields when it comes to networking events, discussions, and application processes.

A 2019 article identifies that Black women are severely underrepresented in computing across undergraduate and graduate levels. The study also identifies a need for more research and discourse on experiences of black women in CS. The lack of discourse on this subject is attributed to the differences in power and capabilities in computing, as it is a predominantly white male field. In addition, there is the "conspiracy of silence", the fear that if Black women were to call out on such issues of representation, they would be racially stereotyped as "angry" or "aggressive". Other challenges that come with underrepresentation for women of color include those women facing pressure to be the "best" in their fields, as they are oftentimes the only or one of the few women who identify similarly in their environments.

Overall, incorporating intersectional frameworks is essential for analysis and systematic restructuring representation of Black women in computing. Viewing this issue through a dual lens reveals it is both a matter of social equity and a critical driver of scientific and technological innovation.

== Bringing women into computing ==
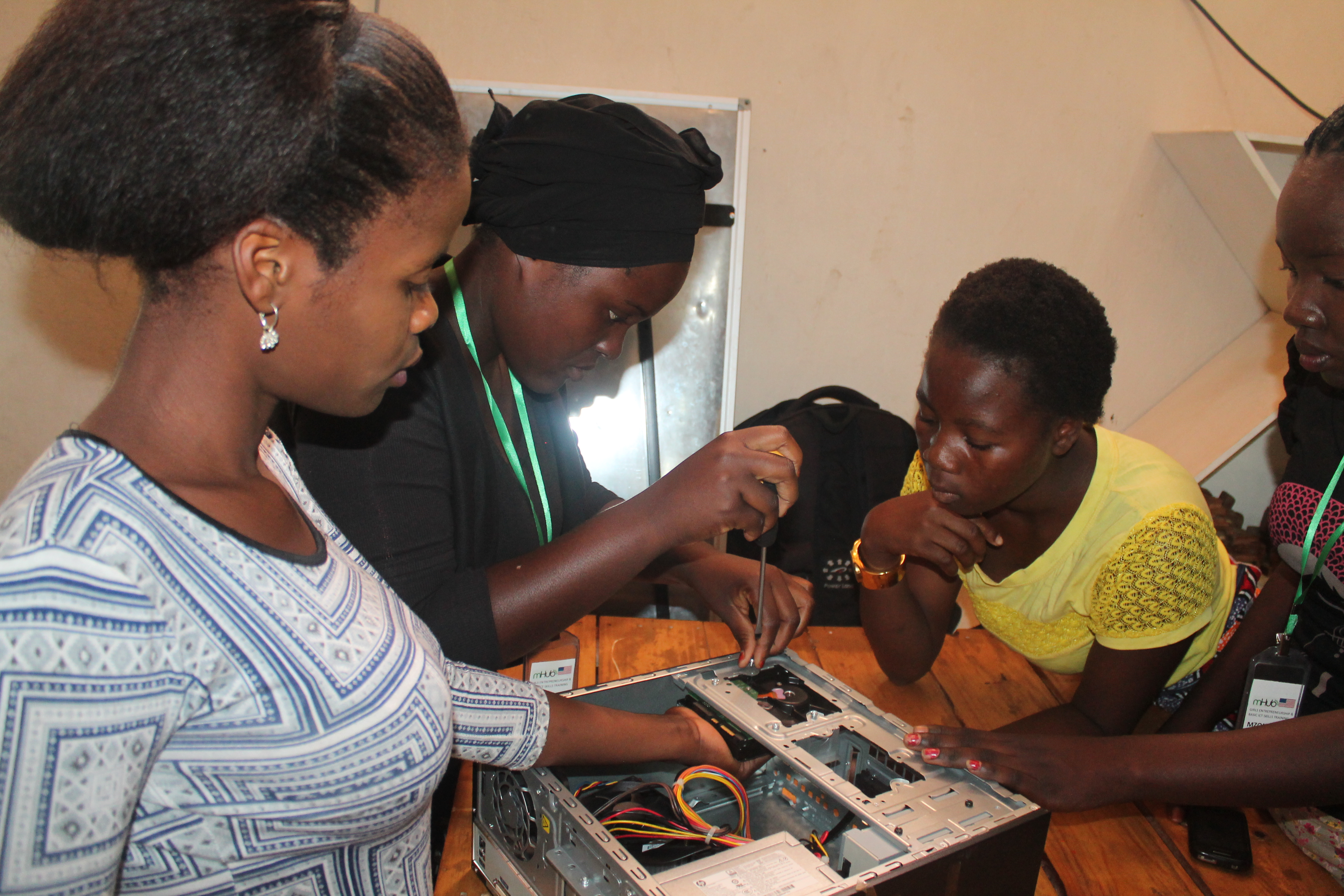
Three women repair computers in Lilongwe, Malawi.

The majority of data collected about women in IT has been qualitative analysis such as interviews and case studies. This data has been used to create effective programs addressing the underrepresentation of women in IT. Suggestions for incorporating more women in IT careers include formal mentoring, ongoing training opportunities, employee referral bonuses, multicultural training for all IT employees, as well as educational programs targeting women.

The number of female college entrants expressing interest in majoring in computer science decreased in the 2000s to pre-1980's levels. A research study was initialized by Allan Fisher, then Associate Dean for Undergraduate Computer Science Education at Carnegie Mellon University, and Jane Margolis, a social scientist and expert in gender equity in education, into the nature of this problem. The main issues discovered in interesting and retaining women in computer science were feelings of an experience gap, confidence doubts, interest in curriculum and pedagogy, and peer culture. Universities across North America are changing their computer science programs to make them more appealing to women. Proactive and positive exposures to early computer experiences, such as The Alice Project, founded by the late Randy Pausch at Carnegie Mellon University, are thought to be effective in terms of retention and creation of enthusiasm for women who may later consider entering the field. Institutions of higher education are also beginning to make changes regarding the process and availability of mentoring to women that are undergraduates in technical fields.

Another strategy for addressing this issue has been early outreach to elementary and high-school girls. Programs like all-girl computer camps, girls' after-school computer clubs, and support groups for girls have been instilled to create more interest at a younger age. A specific example of this kind of program is the Canadian Information Processing Society outreach program, in which a representative is sent to schools in Canada, speaking specifically to grade nine girls about the benefits of Information Technology careers. The purpose is to inform girls about the benefits and opportunities within the field of information technology. Companies like IBM also encourage young women to become interested in engineering, technology and science. IBM offers EX.I.T.E. (Exploring Interests in Technology and Engineering) camps for young women from the ages of 11 to 13.

Additionally, attempts are being made to make the efforts of female computer scientists more visible through events such as the Grace Hopper Celebration of Women conference series which allows women in the field to meet, collaborate and present their work. In the U.S., the Association for Women in Computing was founded in Washington, D.C. in 1978. Its purpose is to provide opportunities for the professional growth of women in computing through networking, and through programs on technical and career-oriented topics. In the United Kingdom, the British Computer Society (BCS) and other organizations have groups which promote the cause of women in computing, such as BCSWomen, founded by Sue Black, and the BCS Women's Forum. In Ontario, Canada, the Gr8 Designs for Gr8 Girls program was founded to develop grade 8 girls' interest in computer science.

Although progress has been made, bringing more women into technology is still a prevalent issue. For example, in case studies across Norway, Spain, and Tunisia in 2022, the gender gap in computing education was not "narrowing significantly" despite the efforts taken to minimize the gender gap in policy and welfare to support women in education and socioeconomic resources.

Factoring in race, Black and Hispanic girls face the most structural and social barriers to accessing computer science education. Even if there are the same opportunities offered, the social barrier, lack of encouragement from teachers and adults, and lack of exposure to their representation in computing from the media contribute to this.

=== Twenty-first century efforts ===
==== National Center for Women & Information Technology ====
National Center for Women & Information Technology (NCWIT) currently leads the support of women's entry and retention in computing. The National Center for Women & Information Technology aims to help create both academic and work environments that are welcoming and fair for women. In their research, encouragement is one of the key elements to help women enter a primarily male-dominated field. They also found women entered computer science due to the influence of a teacher, family member, or friend's encouragement more often than their male counterparts. They conclude that support can allow a woman to believe in her ability to compete in the field of computing. Thus, the NCWIT developed a program called Aspirations in Computing. This program provides girls with encouragement through a network of support and female role models. In a survey done, nearly half of the girls polled said they would feel uncomfortable being the only girl in a group or class. Aspirations in Computing found that creating a sense of belonging or "fitting in" becomes a fundamental for interest and current retention. The National Center for Women & Information Technology created the Aspirations Award in order to involve women in a national competition. Awardees are selected for their computing and IT aptitude, leadership skills, academics, and plans for graduate schooling. Due to their reach and awareness of the program, they saw a 54% increase in the girls applying in the 2013 season compared to the previous year.

==== Academies and organizations ====
In September 2013, Ada Developers Academy, a tuition-free one year intensive school in software development for women was launched by Technology Alliance in Seattle, and students could even apply to receive a $1000-per-month-stipend. The first half of the course focuses on HTML/CSS, JavaScript, Ruby on Rails and computer science fundamentals.

Having started in New York City, Girl Develop It is a network of city chapters that teach women from all parts of the country learn to develop software with HTML and CSS, Javascript, PhP, and other languages and frameworks. The organization was co-founded by Sara Chipps and Vanessa Hurst in 2010. Structural and content resources used to teach the programs have been developed and are offered for free both on their website and on GitHub.com.

Hackbright Academy is an intensive, women-only 10-week programming course in San Francisco. A Moms in Tech sponsorship for Hackbright Academy is also available for mothers who are former IT professionals and wish to retrain and return to work as a technically hands-on lead or manager, sponsored by Facebook.

Geek Girl is an organization that was started in March 2006 by Leslie Fishlock. It is an organization that acts as a technology resource for women. The organization strives to empower women of all ages through making technology easy to understand and use. These services are provided entirely by women. Though the target audience tends to be female and the organization was founded on the goal to empower women, men are also encouraged to participate in any of the events or services the organization offers.

Geek Girl hosts localized events, meetups, and conferences. The organization also supports a video channel titled GeekGirl TV that provides workshops about technological tools as well as provides coverage for their events for those who are unable to attend. Additionally, Geek Girl's website hosts a blog that provides technology-related news and information that is accessible to a reader with minimal technology experience.

Girls Who Code is a nonprofit organization, founded to close the gap of gender within technology. The organization was founded by Reshma Saujani in 2012 in New York City with around 20 girls. As of August 2017, the organization is now in all 50 states with a membership of 40,000 girls. The organization holds programs, like the Summer Immersion Program, where participants are paired with companies within the STEM field. They are able to gain experience and mentorship through the program. Girls Who Code also hold after school programs in all 50 states.

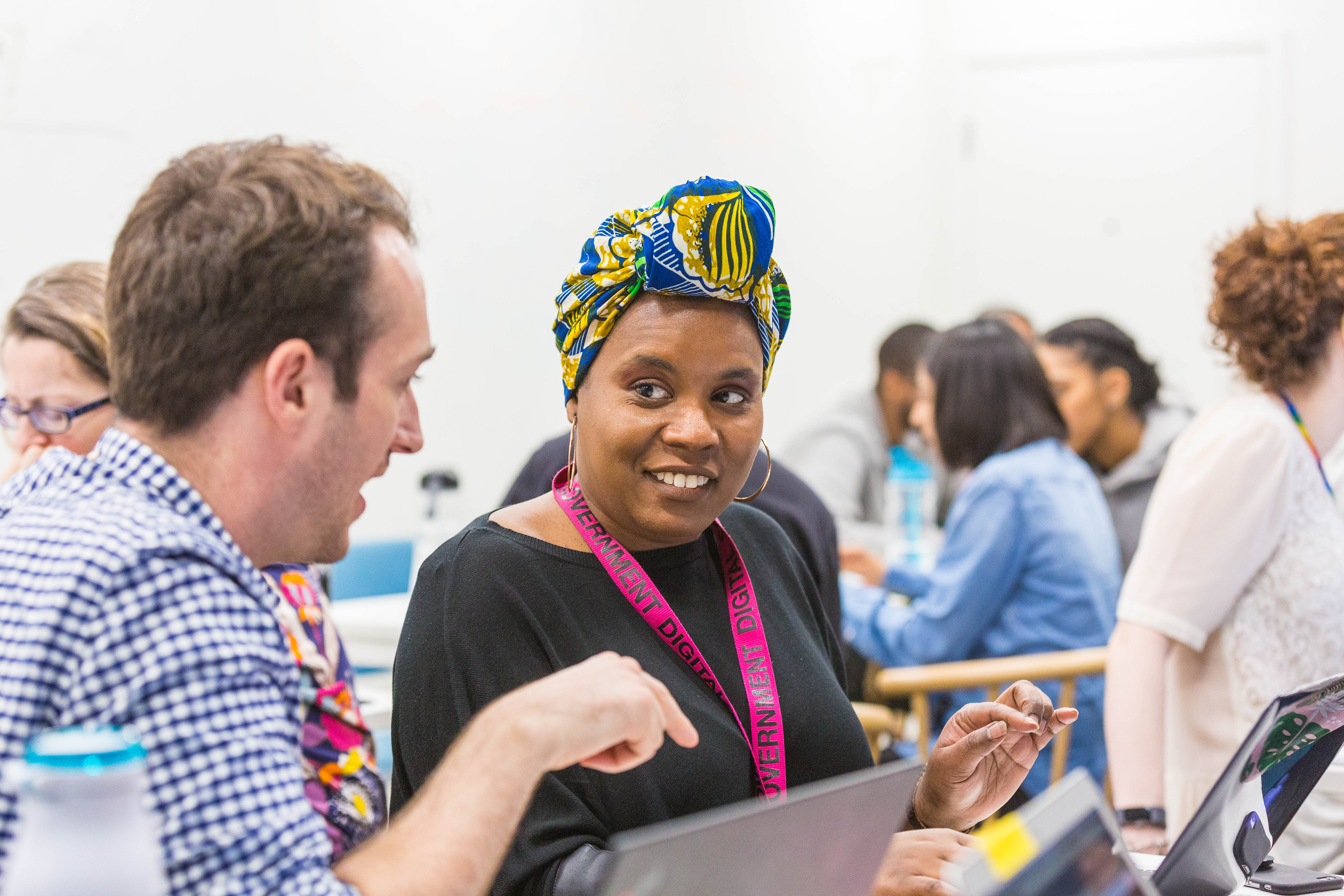
A woman and her colleague learn how to code in a coding workshop.

Grace Hopper Academy, named after Rear Admiral Grace Hopper, is another woman-only immersive programming school, located in New York City. A partner school to Fullstack Academy, Grace Hopper's curriculum focuses on the MEAN stack, and through education and mentorship, aims to help women begin careers in software engineering.

CodeEd is a non-profit organization that focuses on teaching computer science to young girls in underserved communities. The organization partners with schools and programs to help provide volunteer teachers, computer science course offerings, and computers. The organization was co-founded by Angie Sciavoni and Sep Kamvar in 2010. CodeEd provides courses in HTML and CSS, and provides the curriculum and course material for free under a Creative Commons Attribution license. The organization offers classes that are taught by a team of two volunteer teachers, provide lessons in one-hour blocks that may be dispensed in a way that works for the receiving school, and teachers through fun and experimental projects. Code Ed currently offers services in New York City, Boston, and San Francisco.

she++ is an organization that facilitates a community driven to inspire women to take on a role in the computer sciences. The organization was founded at Stanford University by now-alumnae Ellora Israni and Ayna Agarwal, who spearheaded the organization's inaugural conference in April 2012. The conference featured female speakers who held tech positions in companies like Google, Pinterest, and Facebook and was well attended. The conference inspired its organizers to continue with and expand upon she++ and now facilitates participation initiatives through hosting additional events such as a 2013 conference, curating a video library that features inspirational stories from technology professionals, and by offering a mentorship program. The organization is run by a collection of female students and Stanford University.

Nerd Girls was launched in 2000 by Karen Panetta, a professor of electrical and computer engineering at Tufts University. It is an organization that is represented by a group of female engineering students each year and encourages women to take on roles in the engineering and technology profession. The organization celebrates the coincidence of science knowledge and femininity. Participating members solve real-world problems as a group by addressing and fixing technology related issues in the community. Nerd Girls has gained national attention since its launch and has been approached by media producers to create a reality show based on the organization's problem-solving activities. Nerd Girls is sponsored by the Institute of Electrical and Electronics Engineers (IEEE).

Femgineer was started in 2007 by Poornima Vijayashanker. It was originally developed as a blog that focused on engineers, which evolved into an organization that supports women in technology careers. Femgineers is now an education-focused organization that offers workshops, free teaching resources on the topic of technology, supports forums and Meetups, and a team has been developed to continue to expand on the original blog. Poornima Vijayashanker is an avid public speaker and regularly speaks at technology-related conferences and events about the technology industry and about Femgineer itself. In addition to founding Femgineer, she also founded a startup called BizeeBee in 2010 that supports growing fitness businesses, teaches technology workshops for tech-driven organizations around the country, and was named one of the ten women to watch in tech in 2013 by Inc Magazine.

Groups such as the Organization for Security and Co-operation in Europe propose policies that support gender equality in the work field. One example being the Action Plan for the Promotion of Gender Equality. All OSCE states follow policies to ensure gender equality in all work fields.

Black Girls Code is a non-profit organization founded by Kimberly Bryant. Her hope was to provide young colors of color opportunities to learn in-demand skills in technology and computer programming. She wanted to create an encouraging environment, where they would be influenced to enter the technology field when they grow up.

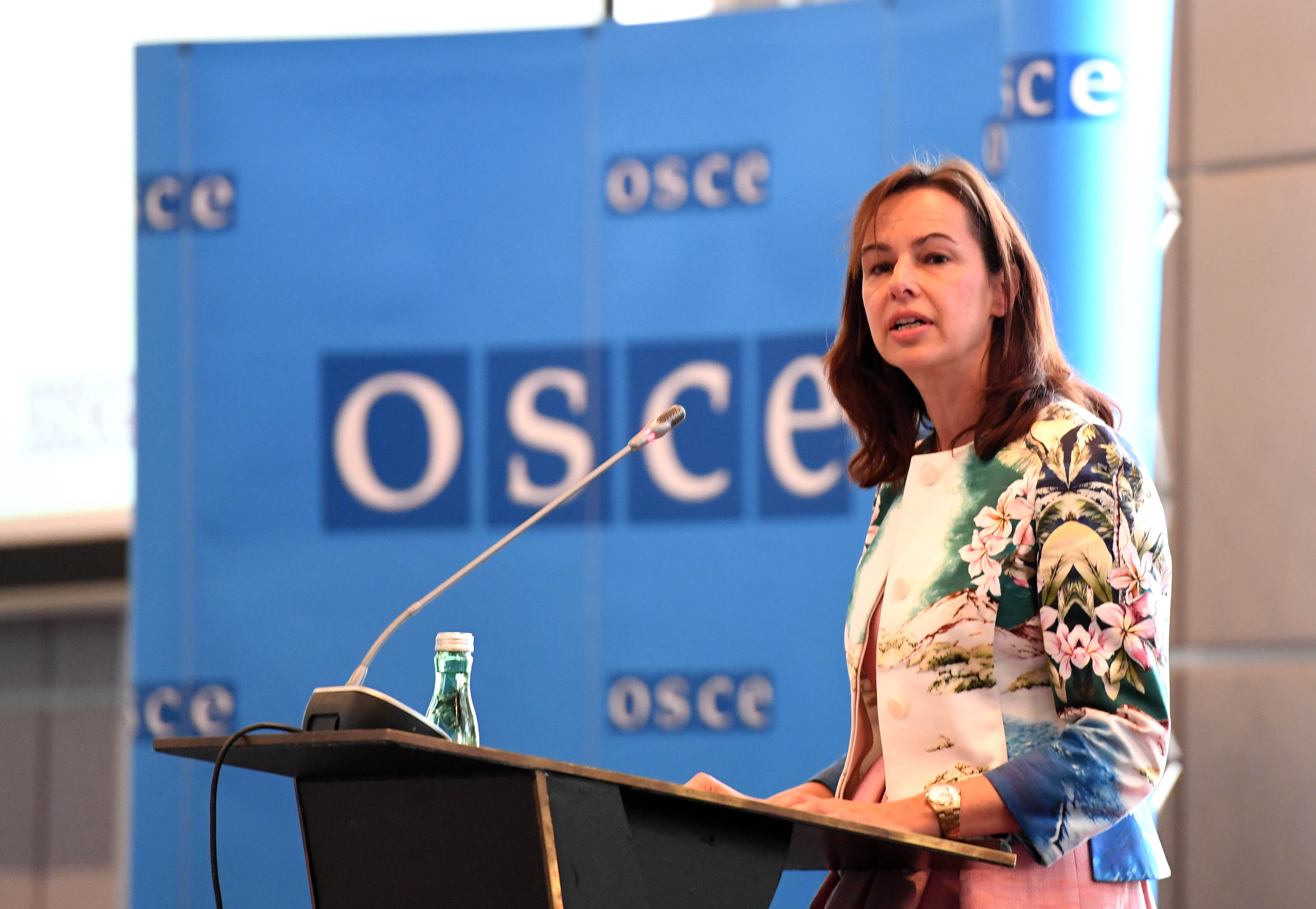
2nd OSCE Gender Equality Review Conference

==== Postsecondary education organization ====
Numerous postsecondary education institutions have student-run organizations that focus on the advancement of women in computer science. In addition to she++ based out of Stanford University, Rochester Institute of Technology (RIT) supports a chapter of the organization called Women In Computing. The campus's chapter of the organization is composed of students, faculty and staff at RIT and they strive to support and further develop the culture of computing to women. This effort is not only focused on their campus, but in the larger community. They host events both on their campus located in Henrietta, New York, and within surrounding Rochester schools. RIT is among a national list of schools that host a chapter of Women in Computing, which is founded in the organization Association for Computing Machinery's committee for women in computing (ACM-W).

Harvard University hosts the organization called Harvard Undergraduate Women in Computer Science (WiSC). The organization aims to promote women in computing across a variety of schools and industries, educate women on the profession of computer science, and provide opportunities for women in technical fields. WiCS supports the annual conference named WECode, a conference that aims to promote women's involvement in computer science.

==== Pacesetters ====
In an effort to improve the gender composition in computing, the Women & Information Technology (NCWIT) created a nationwide U.S. program called "Pacesetters". Through this program, twenty-four academic and corporate organizations added close to 1,000 "Net New Women" to the field of computer science by 2012. These Net New Women are women in the sciences that had not originally intended on pursuing a computer science degree. Pacesetters is the first program of its kind where different organizations come together to identify effective ways to broaden the participation of women in computer science. There are currently more than 300 corporations, academic institutions, government agencies and non-profit organizations devoted to this cause. Together they build internal teams in order to develop and fund the needed programs and share their overall results. Pacesetters organizations include some very prestigious companies such as AT&T, Intel, Microsoft, Google, Georgia Tech, Pfizer, and IBM to name a few. These are a few examples of their results due to the work with Pacesetters:

- Google: built new programs for undergraduate women and held a career development panel of engineers which gave women the chance to participate in mock interviews. Due to these efforts, the number of women applicants grew and Google doubled the number of women in their software engineering summer internship program in 2011 compared to 2010.
- Intel: piloted a program called Command Presence Workshop in which senior technical women participated in specialized training,
- Virginia Tech: created a team of CS faculty, advisors, and student mentors to interact with potential female undergraduates and high school students. They saw a 56% increase in the number of female students who showed interest in their science programs.

== Relation to gender theory ==
There are a number of thinkers who engage with gender theories and issues related to women and technology. Such thinkers include, for example, Donna Haraway, Sadie Plant, Julie Wosk, Sally L. Hacker, Evelyn Fox Keller, Janet Abbate, Thelma Estrin, and Thomas J. Misa, among others. Recoding Gender: Women's Changing Participation in Computing, written in 2012 by Janet Abbate, examines the history of programming and how gender bias shifted the demographic of programmers. The main argument made by Janet Abbate in this book was that women are discriminated against in the technology field and are not given the same opportunities as men. This is a problem in the world today because everyone should be treated equally and not judged based on their gender. It is unfair for someone to be overlooked and not given the same opportunities to showcase their skills. A method used by Janet Abbate throughout this book was archival research. She used data from the U.S. Department of Labor and the U.S. Department of Commerce from the end of the twentieth century. It makes sense that she would use this method because she was researching information from the late 1900s. A 2008 book titled Gender and Information Technology: Moving Beyond Access to Co-Create Global Partnership, uses Riane Eisler's cultural transformation theory to offer an interdisciplinary, social systems perspective on issues of access to technology. The book explores how shifting from dominator towards partnership systems—as reflected in four primary social institutions (communication, media, education, and business) — might help society move beyond the simplistic notion of access to co-create a real digital revolution worldwide.

A 2000 book titled Athena Unbound provides a life-course analysis (based on interviews and surveys) of women in the sciences from an early childhood interest, through university, to graduate school and finally into the academic workplace. The thesis of this book is that "women face a special series of gender related barriers to entry and success in scientific careers that persist, despite recent advances."

Computer scientist Karen Petrie, from University of Dundee, has developed an argument to illustrate why an attack on sexism in computing is not an attack on men. Ian Gent, University of St Andrews, has described this idea which is key to the argument as the "Petrie Multiplier."

According to J. McGrath Cohoon, senior research scientist for the National Center for Women & Information Technology, there are a few possible hypotheses for why women are underrepresented in computer sciences attributed to already established theories about the influence of gender and technology stereotypes. One gender related hypothesis is that women find it more difficult than men to contribute to the intellectual life of the field in the sense that reviewers of their work are unconsciously downgraded due to their status as women, or those women have lower confidence in this field that inhibits women's willingness to publicly present their technical findings. Due to this barrier of women as second-class citizens in the computing world, it creates an environment that is not accessible to women. A study by the Psychology of Women Quarterly backs this hypothesis up by concluding that even the enduring effect of single, brief exposures to stereotypical role models leaves a strong mark. Their findings reported that the most important factor in recruiting women to the computer science field is that women meet with a potential role model, regardless of gender of that role model, that conveys to the woman a sense of belonging in the field. This finding suggests that support and encouragement are the two most important aspects that can influence women participation in computing. In order for women to be more receptive to the field is if the environment became a more welcoming place by their male counterparts.

Cordelia Fine in her book Delusions of Gender argues that apparent differences are due to constant exposure to societal beliefs of gender difference. Fine also argues that "...while social effects on sex differences are well-established, spurious results, poor methodologies and untested assumptions mean we don't yet know whether, on average, males and females are born differently predisposed to systemizing versus empathising."

Another argument for why women are less prevalent in computer science is the ill-defined nature of computing, according to Paul De Palma. In his article, "Why Women Avoid Computer Science," he postulates that women find careers in computing unattractive. He finds that among the many reasons offered, he believes the nature of computing is what drives them away. He claims that young men who are drawn to computer science and engineering are those that like to tinker, those who like to use tools to create and dismantle objects. He further claims that computing is not a true profession, that traditional career paths such as law, business, and medicine are more certain and profitable on average than computing. He compares it to using a computer, computers nowadays do not come with lengthy manuals on the inner workings of the modern day computer, in fact our tools are always more complicated than their what they are used for, thus the tinkering nature of men, the drive born from gender stereotyping from birth, has made men successful in this field for they are more inclined to spend endless hours of tinkering with software and hardware. His claim revolves around the focus that boys and girls fall into gender stereotypes, girls who are usually given dolls and boys who are given trucks and toy tool boxes. He claims that these gender roles placed on children is one of the primary causes for the gender gap seen in computer science. He postulates that if we were to see more girls playing with trucks and other "boy-related" toys that perhaps we would see an increase in this tinkering nature and therefore, more participation of women in the computer science field.

== Notable organizations ==
- Ada Initiative
- Anita Borg Institute for Women and Technology, group for support of women, runs the Grace Hopper Celebration of Women in Computing yearly conference.
- Association for Computing Machinery (ACM) Committee on Women
- Association for Women in Computing: one of the first professional organizations for women in computing. AWC is dedicated to promoting the advancement of women in the computing professions.
- BCSWomen, a women-only Specialist Group of the British Computer Society
- Black Girls Code, non-profit focused on providing technology education to young African-American women.
- Center for Women in Technology, university center focused on increasing the representation of women in the creation of technology.
- Computing Research Association's Committee on the Status of Women in Computing Research (CRA-W), group focused on increasing the number of women participating in Computer Science and Engineering (CSE) research and education at all levels.
- Girl Develop It, a nonprofit organization that provides affordable programs for adult women interested in learning web and software development in a judgment-free environment.
- Girl Geek Dinners, an International group for women of all ages.
- Girls Who Code, a national non-profit organization dedicated to closing the gender gap in technology.
- LinuxChix, a women-oriented community in the open source movement.
- National Center for Women & Information Technology, a nonprofit that increases the number of women in technology and computing.
- Portland Women in Technology (PDXWIT), a Portland-based and BIPOC-led nonprofit that aims to advance inclusion in the technology industry
- Systers, a moderated listserv dedicated to mentoring women in the Systers community.
- Women in computing in Canada
- Women in Technology International, global organization dedicated to the advancement of women in business and technology.
- Women's Technology Empowerment Centre (W.TEC), non-profit organisation focused on providing technology education and mentoring to Nigerian women and girls.
- Women Who Code

== See also ==
- Gender digital divide
- List of organizations for women in science
- Sexism in the technology industry
- Diversity in open-source software
