= GGS =

GGS or GGs may refer to:

== Education ==
- Geelong Grammar School, in Victoria, Australia
- Gravesend Grammar School, in Kent, England
- Guildford Grammar School, in Perth, Western Australia
- Grosvenor Grammar School, in Belfast, Northern Ireland

== Other uses ==
- Ganteng-Ganteng Serigala, an Indonesian television series
- Generations and Gender Survey
- Gerald Gentleman Station, a power station in Nebraska
- German Geophysical Society
- Germany Guard Service
- Gibson Generating Station, a power station in Indiana
- Girl Geek Scotland
- Girl Guides Singapore
- Global Geo Services, a Norwegian seismic company
- Global Geospace Science, a NASA program
- Glucosylglycerate synthase
- Gobernador Gregores Airport, in Argentina
- Governor General's Awards, in Canada
- The Great Giana Sisters, video game
- Guns, Germs, and Steel
- Guru Granth Sahib, the central religious scripture of Sikhism
- Gyro gunsight
- Ottawa Gee-Gees, the University of Ottawa athletic team

== See also ==
- GG (disambiguation)
