= Diversity in computing =

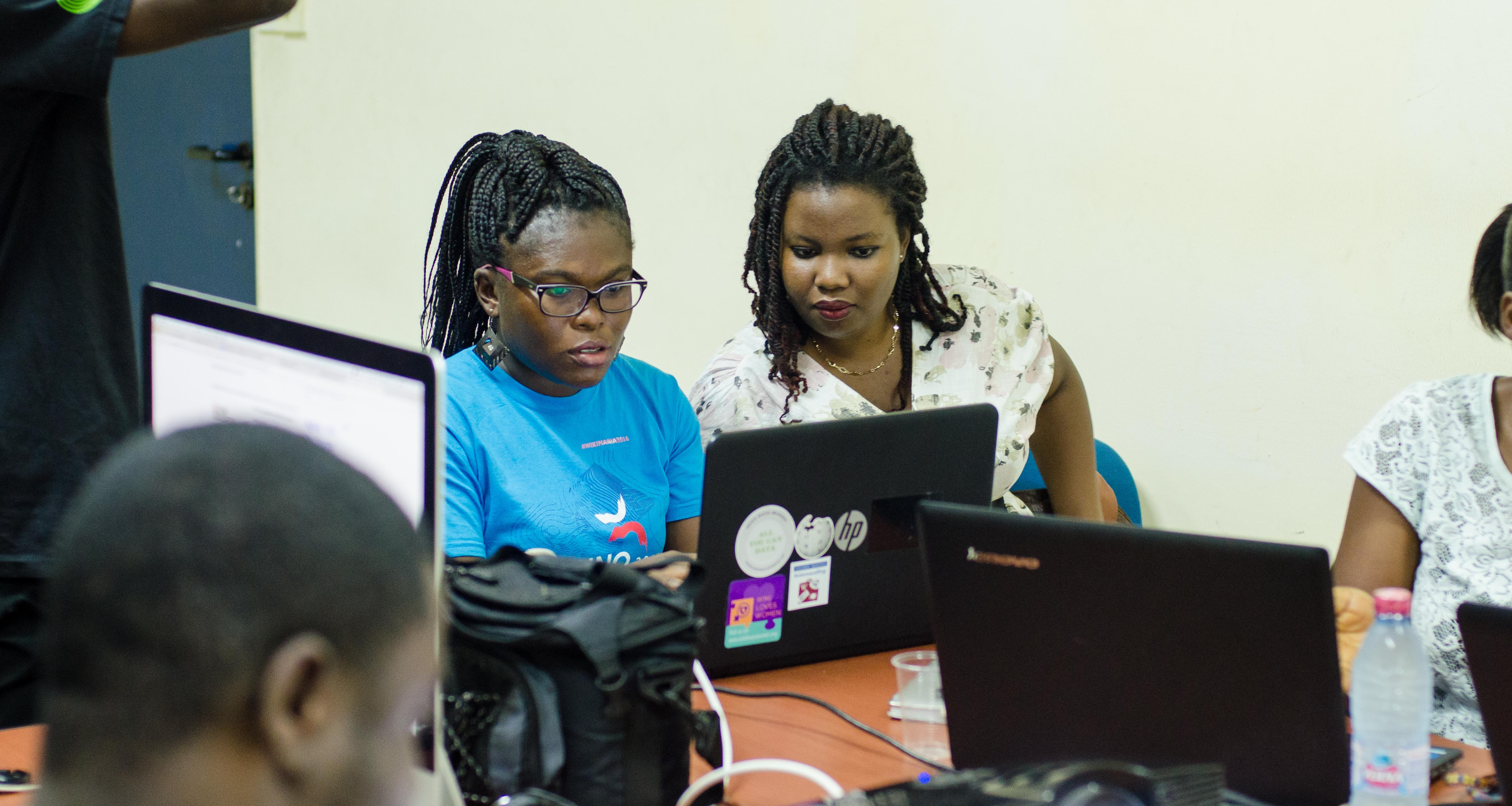
Ghanaian women at a Women Who Code, Wiki Loves Women event

Diversity in computing refers to the representation and inclusion of underrepresented groups, such as women, people of color, individuals with disabilities, and LGBTQ+ individuals, in the field of computing. The computing sector, like other STEM fields, lacks diversity in the United States.

== Statistics ==
In 2019, women represented 50.8% of the total population of the United States, but made up only 25.6% of computer and mathematical occupations and 27% of computer and information systems manager occupations. African Americans represented 13.4% of the population, but held 8.4% of computer and mathematical occupations. Hispanic or Latino people made up 18.3% of the population, but constituted only 7.5% of the people in these jobs. Meanwhile, white people, standing at 60.4%-76.5% of the population of the United States, represented 67% of computer and mathematical occupations and 77% of computer and information systems manager occupations. Asians, representing 5.9% of the population, held 22% of computer and mathematical jobs and were 14.3% of all computer and information systems managers.

In 2021, women made up 51% of the total population aged 18 to 74 years old, yet only accounted for 35% of STEM occupations. Additionally, while individuals with disabilities made up 9% of the population, they accounted for 3% of STEM occupations. Hispanics, Blacks, and American Indians or Alaska Natives collectively only accounted for 24% of STEM occupations in 2021 while making up 31% of the total population.

In addition to occupational disparities, there are differences in representation in postsecondary science and engineering education. Women earning associate's or bachelor's degrees in science and engineering accounted for approximately half of the total number of degrees in 2020, which was proportional to their share of the population for the age range of 18 – 34 years. In contrast, women only accounted for 46% of science and engineering master's degrees and 41% of science and engineering doctoral degrees. Hispanics, Blacks, and American Indians or Alaska Natives as a group face a similar gap between their share of the population and proportion of degrees earned, with them collectively making up 37% of the college age population in 2021, yet only 26% of bachelor's degrees in science and engineering, 24% of master's degrees in science and engineering, and 16% of doctoral degrees in science and engineering awarded in 2020. On top of the degree gap, data indicates that only 38% of women who major in computer science actually end up working in the computer science field, in contrast to 53% of men.

A 2021 report indicates that approximately 57% of women working in tech responded that have experienced gender discrimination in the workplace in contrast with men, where approximately only 10% reported experiencing gender discrimination. Additionally, 48% of women reported experiencing discrimination over their technical abilities in contrast with only 24% of men reporting the same discrimination. The report also found that 48% of Black respondents indicated that they experienced racial discrimination in the tech workplace. Hispanic respondents followed at 30%, Asian/Pacific Islanders responded at 25%, Asian Indians responded at 23%, and White respondents followed them at 9%.

In a 2022 survey available on Stack Overflow, approximately 2% of all respondents identified either "in their own words" or "transgender." On top of that, approximately 16% of all respondents identified using an option other than "Straight/Heterosexual." Additionally, 10.6% of respondents identified as having a concentration and/or memory disorder, 10.3% identified as having an anxiety disorder, and 9.7% as having a mood or emotional disorder.

When it comes to career mobility, a 2022 report found that there is a gap in promotions given in the tech industry to women in comparison to men. The report found that for every 100 men promoted to manager, only 52 women were given the same promotion.

== Factors contributing to underrepresentation ==
There are two reported reasons for the lack of participation of women and minorities in the computing sector. The first reason is the lack of early exposure to resources like computers, internet connections and experiences such as computer courses. Research shows that the digital divide acts as a factor; students who do not already have computer skills upon entering college are at a disadvantage in computing majors, and access to computers is influenced by demographics, such as ethnic background. The problem of lack of resources is compounded with lack of exposure to courses and information that can lead to a successful computing career. A survey of students at University of Maryland Eastern Shore and Howard University, two historically black universities, found that the majority of students were not "counseled about computer related careers" either before or during college. The same study (this time only surveying UMES students) found that fewer women than men had learned about computers and programming in high school. The researchers have concluded that these factors could contribute to lower numbers of women and minorities choosing to pursue computing degrees.

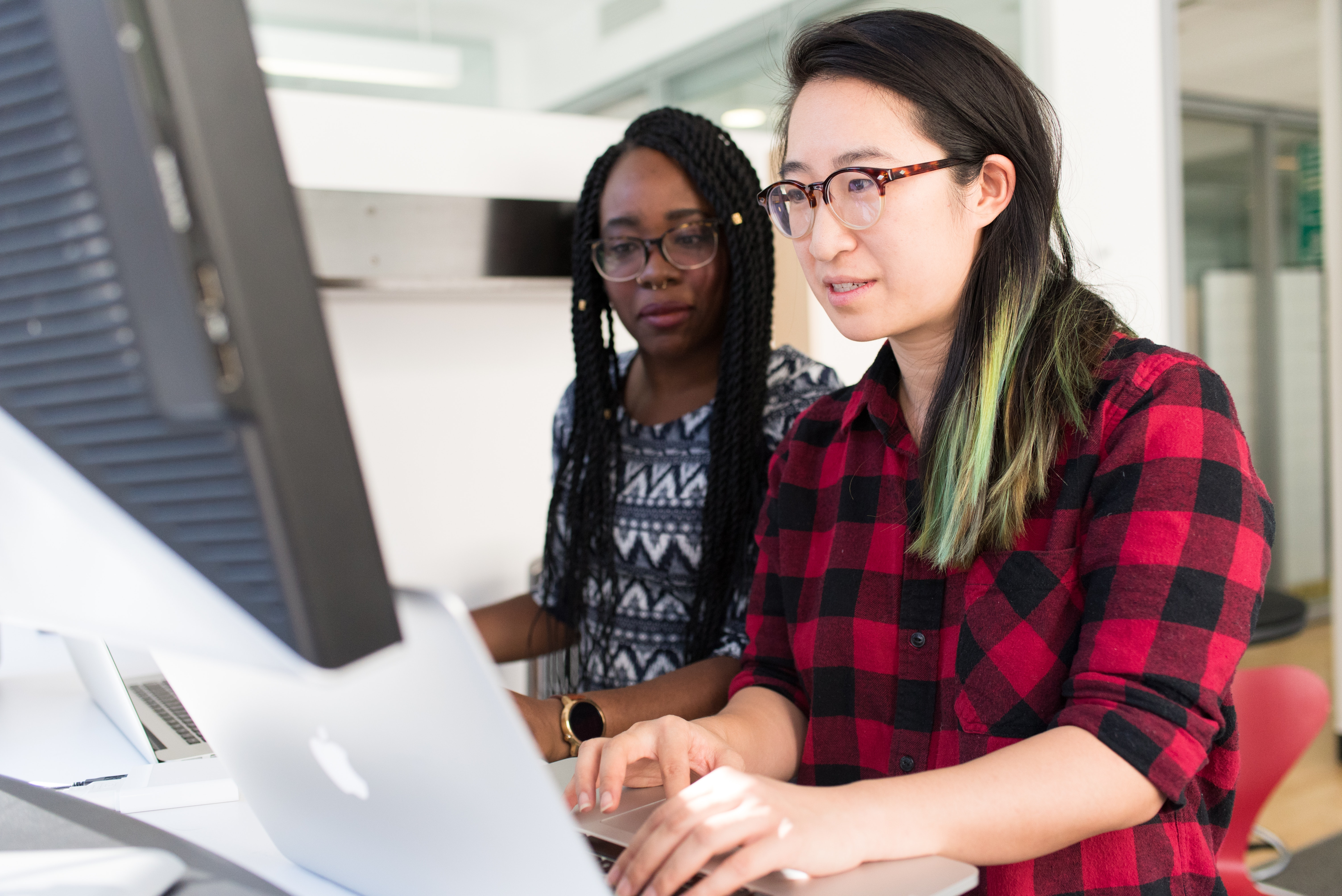

Another reported issue that leads to the homogeneity of the computing sector is the cultural issue of discrimination at the workplace and how minorities are treated. For participants to excel in a tech-related course or career, their sense of belonging matters more than pre-gained knowledge. That was reflected in “The Great Resignation” that took place in the US during the COVID-19 pandemic. In a survey of 2,030 workers between the ages of 18 and 28 conducted in July 2021, the company found that 50% said they had left or wanted to their leave tech or IT job “because the company culture made them feel unwelcome or uncomfortable,” with a higher percentage of women and Asian, Black, and Hispanic respondents each saying they had such an experience. In most cases, the workplaces not only lack a sense of belonging but are also unsafe. Research conducted by Dice, a tech career hub, showed that more than 50% of women faced sexual harassment in tech companies. A pilot program that was done to understand different elements that affect minorities during a STEM course showed that increased mentorship and support was an important factor for the completion of the course.

One of the biggest factors halting the increase of diversity in STEM education is awareness. Many experts feel that increasing awareness is a strong first step towards enacting change at a higher level. One of the most common outreach methods are on campus workshops at colleges. These workshops are effective because they instill awareness into people who are just coming into the field and learning about the field to foster inclusivity. Students leaving a workshop at a West Virginia university reported that they were unaware of the problems facing diverse people in STEM, particularly people with disabilities.

== Effects on different groups ==
=== Black people ===
==== Gaming ====
Black gamers are put into unique positions when it comes to entering spaces of gaming, for when they are represented incorrectly whilst constantly at risk of being harassed for a wide variety of reasons. Whenever they are represented, which is not as often as is what occurs in the real world, it typically comes at the price of being stereotyped into typically two categories: being an athlete, a criminal, or both. If they decide to call out these issues, there is typically heavy backlash for their actions. One such example comes from The Sims community. When its black player base call out issues about various hair texture representations, enter Sims community spaces, or see storylines about black sims members, they typically faced racial attacks, microagressions, or see storylines of characters that looked like them that were based on prevalent stereotypes of black people. The solution to their issues did not come from the creators, but rather groups of black Sims players coming together to make their own spaces in order to have somewhere to go to. Moreover, Black content creators have a unique space within the gaming world: they need to maintain a level of being black that allows people to be comfortable with watching their content, but in creating who they are as creators, they are inherently creating spaces for racialized comments against them that fills their comment sections. Moreover, whenever they do ask for bigger changes, companies take on a race-blind approach to ignoring the problems within the communities they are allowing to exist. When black people are included, it’s mostly because the games being played are inherently included in African American culture, and often considered “diversity nights” for black creators.

==== Artificial Intelligence ====
The issues that lie dormant within the training data of large language models such as ChatGPT can be seen through how it sees black people. Former Google AI Ethicist Timnit Gebru had her time end at Google due to complications over a paper that described the issues of some AI Ethicists: its carbon impact is an issue that could create many issues very soon, greater datasets would lead to complications with currently insensitive vocabulary that was utilized in earlier days of the internet, and the amount of effort it takes to train the model again if something were to fail. There has already been clear evidence that AI models have latent biases that claim that white men are the best scientists. When this was discovered, OpenAI quickly created a block for questions that directly pertained to race, rather than fixing the issue at hand. Something else is the idea of beauty: when creating a supposedly unbiased judge for a beauty contest, BeautyAI asked for submissions from throughout the world, and within its 44 winners of the contest, 38 were white, and 1 finalist had an obvious darker skin tone. These submissions also were used in a manner of gleaning information about health factors affecting the users, and the fact that "healthy" people were put further to the front implies to the AI model that those who are darker skin toned are generally less healthy. Within both of these models, there exists training data that inherently has been given data that presents biases against people of color. A lack of representation within the spaces of developing these models creates an underlying issue of a lack of consideration for more people to be included. If the people that initial testing is done on are coworkers, it is possible that these models from the beginning are untested on all scenarios.

==== Surveillance ====
Black and Latinx communities have frequently been the targets of new surveillance and risk assessment technologies that have brought more arrest to these communities. The police have utilized tools to target communities of color for decades. One of the earliest examples of this occurring within the borders United States itself was directly after attacks on the Twin Towers. The New York Police Department used community leaders, taxi drivers, and extensive databases that managed to find ways of connecting people together in order to find more potential terrorists that lived within the United States. This has mostly been done through a program called CompStat, and many precincts have been encouraged to do the same because of its ability to find high crime areas and put more police in areas where they believe crime will happen, leading to even more arrests. In time, this has created systems in which entire states have attempted to create gang databases that have been based on risk assessments, but in turn created situations where children less than a year old were determined to be "self identified gang members". This creates a sense of both confusion and distrust amongst those within these communities, and in turn could lead to even more violence and arrests. These programs have been used throughout the United States such as Boston, Massachusetts, Salina, California, and, most clearly, Camden, New Jersey. Outside of specifically Boston, most of these places have not provided social services to those who are a part of these cycles of violence. Rather, they prefer to put them into prison. This cycle is a positive feedback loop for the computers, and does not help these communities.

==== Social media ====
Africans throughout the world have a much higher risk of harassment through the internet:

1. The two countries with the highest levels of cyberbullying reports came from Kenya and Nigeria, with around 70% of all users claiming to have received hate throughout their time using the internet.
2. Tweets that have discriminatory ideals within them are linked to rates of hate crimes within the area that the Tweet was made.
3. Black People are more likely to report the attacks they received throughout the internet are mostly based on their race.

There is an inherent tie to being black within the internet and also receiving racially-charged hatred. Moreover, because of the lax nature of many popular social media sites (such as Twitter), there exists many ways in which white nationalists can come together to spread hatred through large hate waves that target people of color, and most especially black women.

== Increasing diversity ==
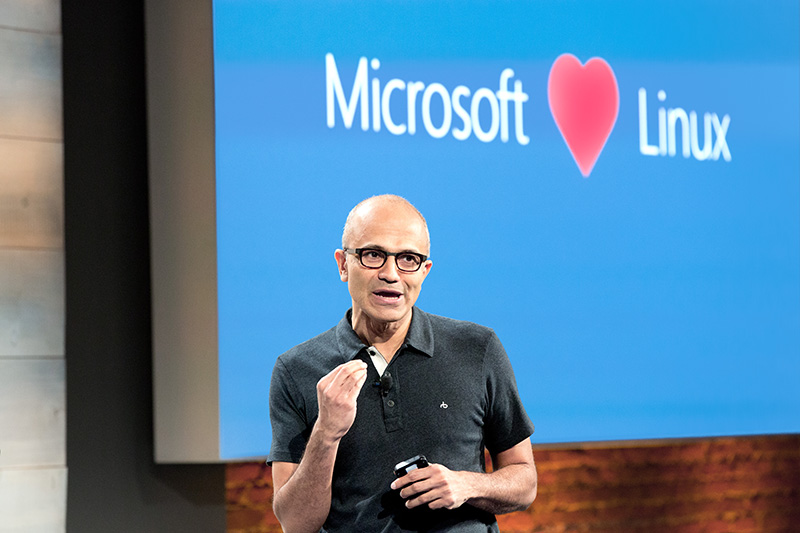

Institutions working to improve diversity in the computing sector are focusing on increasing access to resources and building a sense of belonging for minorities. One organization working toward this goal is EarSketch, an educational coding program that allows users to produce music by coding in JavaScript and Python. Its aim is to spark interest in programming and computer science for a wider range of students and "to attract different demographics, especially girls." The nonprofit Black Girls Code is working to encourage and empower black girls and girls of color to enter the world of computing by teaching them how to code. The American nonprofit for minority students in computer science, ColorStack, also works towards a similar goals, using mentorship-based operations and hosting multiple in-person and virtual support programs as a means of doing so. Another way to widen access to resources is by increasing equality in access to computers. Students who use computers in school settings are more likely to use them outside the classroom, so bringing computers into the classroom improves students' computer literacy.

Those who work in the field of education, primarily educators, have a significant impact on how students perceive the fields of engineering and computing, as well as their own capabilities within these fields. According to the American Association of University Women (AAUW), there are several things that teachers can do to cultivate a sense of confidence in underrepresented individuals interested in pursuing an education or career in the field of computing. Some of these things that educators can do are:

1. Emphasize that engineering skills and abilities can be acquired through learning. In other words, emphasize the idea of a growth mindset.
2. Portray obstacles and challenges as universal experiences, rather than indicators of unsuitability for engineering or computing.
3. Increase accessibility to computing for people from diverse backgrounds and reject the notion that some individuals are inherently better suited to the field.
4. Highlight the varied and extensive applications of engineering and computing.
5. Establish inclusive environments for girls in math, science, engineering, and computing where they're encouraged to tinker with technology and develop confidence in their programming and design skills.

Another way for educators to affect change and help to resolve the problem is through certain intervention methods that have shown to have a positive impact on the issue. These can be implemented by institutions rather than individuals and have shown a lot of promise. Of these there are ten that have been heavily researched and are as follows:

1. Summer Bridge: Summer bridge programs are meant to help students from low income families transition to college life and take place between the end of a prospective student's senior year of high school and freshman year of college. Summer bridge programs are meant to help students adjust and get ahead in their college lives.
2. Mentoring: In this program each student must take a mentor that they can trust to help them when they find themselves struggling while also promoting individual successes.
3. Research Experience: Students participate in research on or off campus during their time as an undergraduate. This has been found to greatly increase a student's likelihood of pursuing a graduate degree compared to students who do not participate in research.
4. Tutoring: One of the most common academic intervention methods a student seeks out a knowledgeable individual to provide extra instruction and practice.
5. Career Counseling and Awareness: Having a connection to someone in the field that a student is trying to join is extremely important. If an institution can help to connect students with someone in their prospective career it causes a higher likelihood of that student staying in that field.
6. Learning Center: An on campus learning center is a place where students can go to learn skills that will help them succeed in school in general. Topics like study skills and note taking skills are taught free of charge.
7. Workshops and Seminars: Short Classes and meetings on campus that focus on skills or research work from professors at other universities who are visiting. Workshops can be used to learn knowledge that is outside of the curriculum.
8. Academic Advising: Higher Quality academic advising is a large factor in increasing student retention. If students feel adequately supported and are paced correctly throughout their experience they are much more likely to finish their degree.
9. Financial Support: Giving financial aid to students through merit scholarships or other outside scholarship opportunities has been found to increase retention rates among Students.
10. Curriculum and Instructional Reform: Find and isolate areas of the program that are meant to “weed out” students and refactor them to be challenging but rewarding.

These methods on their own are not enough to adequately increase the diversity of the talent pool but have shown promise as potential solutions. They can be most effective when used in an integrated manner, meaning the more that are studied and utilized the closer to a solution STEM educators will be.

Since workplace discrimination causes lack of diversity in STEM, changing that would increase diversity in the sector. Big tech companies like Microsoft and Facebook are publishing diversity reports and investing in programs to make their companies more diverse.

Additionally, while companies dedicating resources to initiatives designed to promote diversity within their workplaces is a great start, there is more that tech companies can do. The AAUW published a set of proposals for STEM employers to adopt, aimed at enhancing diversity within their organizations:

1. Sustain effective management practices that are equitable, consistent, and promote a healthy work environment.
2. Administer and advocate for diversity and affirmative action policies.
3. Minimize the detrimental effects of gender bias.
4. Foster a sense of inclusion and belonging.
5. Allow employees the opportunity to work on projects or initiatives that have social significance.

== See also ==
- Diversity in open-source software
- Gender disparity in computing
- STEM pipeline
- Women in computing
