= ColorStack =

Nonprofit for minority students in computer science

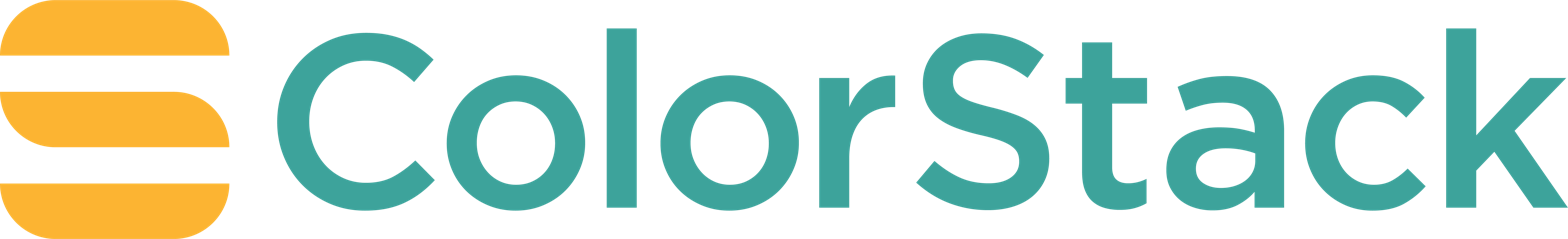
- Type: 501(c)(3) nonprofit organization
- Founded: May 2020; 6 years ago in Cornell University
- Founder: Jehron Petty
- Headquarters: Freeport, New York, U.S.
- Number of locations: 108 (2026)
- Area served: Canada; United States
- Services: Academic advising; Career development
- Members: 6,001 (2026)
- Number of employees: 1,112 (2026)
- Website: colorstack.org

ColorStack is a nonprofit student organization that offers academic advising and career development opportunities for computer science students in the United States and Canada. It is specifically designed for students from minority backgrounds as a means of improving diversity in computing.

Cornell University alumnus Jehron Petty founded ColorStack in May 2020 after recognizing that his own success in computer science was an "anomaly in the ecosystem". The organization runs in-person and virtual programs and events, many of which focus on mentorship and help members obtain scholarships and internships.

As of 2026, ColorStack had 108 chapters and 6,001 members at universities across the United States and Canada. One of the organization's goals is to increase brand recognition comparable to that of the National Society of Black Engineers and Black Girls Code.

== Activities ==
ColorStack is a 501(c)(3) nonprofit organization. Its purpose is to build connections among computer science students from minority backgrounds by providing academic advising and career development opportunities. To accomplish this, the nonprofit organizes a number of programs and events, including an annual three-day conference called "Stacked Up Summit". The summit has featured engineers from companies including Duolingo and Netflix, while also offering underclassmen opportunities to talk to recruiters. Virtual events within and between chapters including hackathons have also been organized by the nonprofit or local chapters. ColorStack also hosts a community on the team communication platform Slack, where members can collaborate on coding and other personal interests.

Aside from large annual events, smaller events organized and hosted by local chapters make up the majority of club meetings. These vary but often focus on technical and professional development or social activities. These events have included learning technical skills, taking professional photos, networking, resume building, practicing interviews, and attending conferences and speaker events with field professionals. For some chapters' speaker events, recruiters or employees from large companies have been invited to give talks. Many of these events are mentorship-focused, with the goal of helping members obtain scholarships and internships. Social events vary by chapter as well, but often focus on relieving occupational burnout through less technical events like arts and crafts. For instance, at Binghamton University, a "Sip and Apply" event takes place where members consume beverages from different cuisines while applying for internships. At Columbia University and Virginia Tech, pizza dinners give members opportunities to socialize and discuss the field.

== History ==
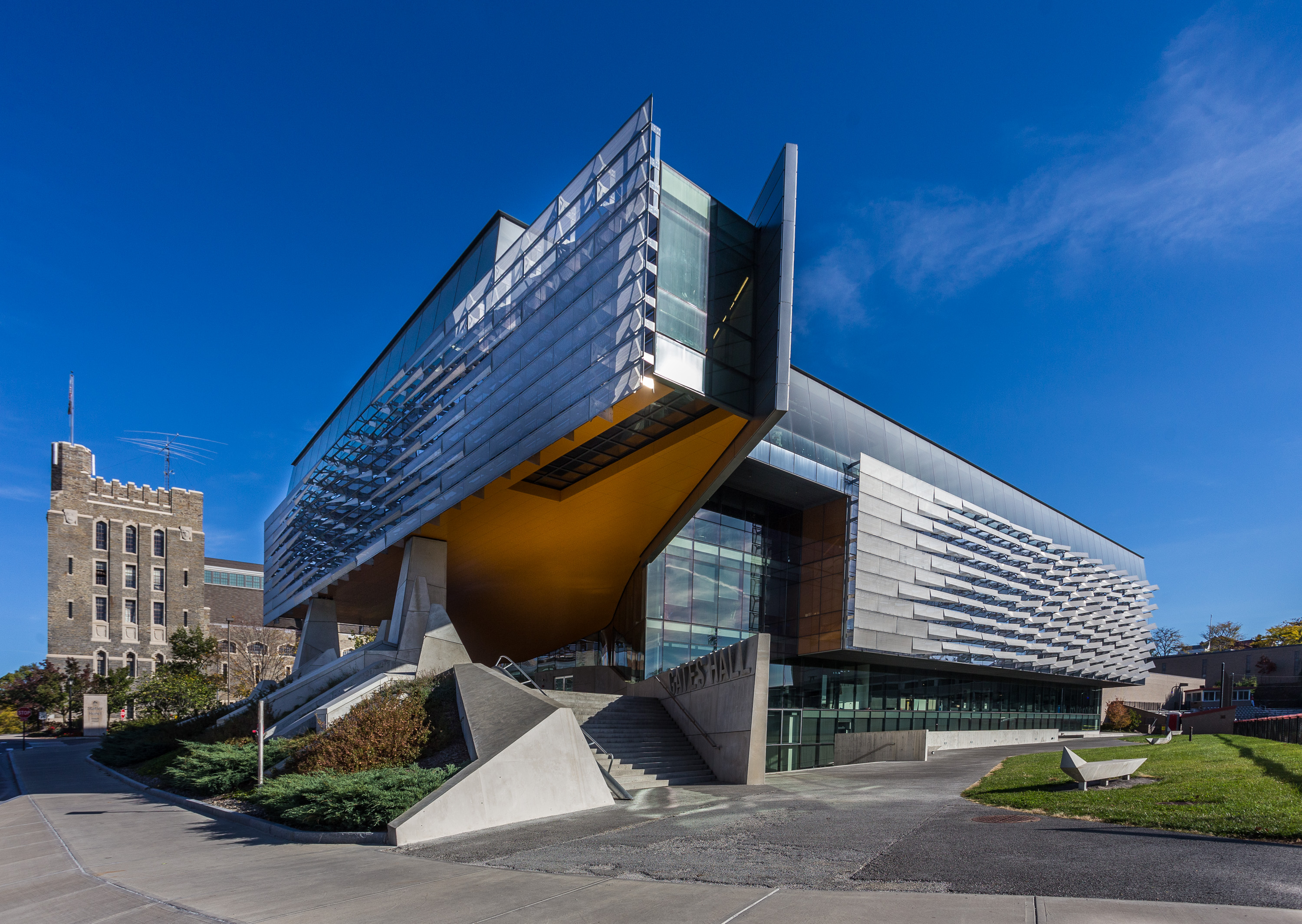
Bill & Melinda Gates Hall, the main building for computer science majors like Petty at Cornell University

ColorStack was founded by Jehron Petty, a student at Cornell University majoring in computer science in the class of 2020. After completing internships at Two Sigma and Google as a software engineer and product manager, respectively, Petty reportedly realized he was an "anomaly in the ecosystem". The few other African American, Hispanic American, and Native American students studying with him were not performing as well, which he credited to a lack of proper support.

While still a student, Petty was co-president of Cornell's Underrepresented Minorities in Computing (URMC) club, where he helped increase membership. This success motivated him to think about how to expand the program and support students at other universities. Taking principles from this club, namely the focus on mentorship and inspiring and supporting minority students in computer science, Petty formed an early version of ColorStack. With help and advice from Makinde Adeagbo, founder of the similar organization /dev/color, Petty made the club national and a nonprofit.

Petty launched ColorStack shortly after graduating in May 2020, raising nearly US$500,000. In August 2020, the nonprofit partnered with the technical recruiting platform Triplebyte, which agreed to incubate the organization and provide operational funding for at least two years. At the time, ColorStack had 600 students across its chapters. By the following year, it had grown to 1,000 students, and had raised more than US$1 million from corporate sponsors and other investors. ColorStack had also grown to be managed by four full-time employees and one intern. Further growth came after restrictions from the COVID-19 pandemic were lifted, which had prevented some chapters from beginning operations. ColorStack gained Microsoft and Netflix as sponsors of one of its "Stacked Up Summit" events in 2021. Four years later, the nonprofit opened its first chapter outside the United States, in Alberta, Canada.

As of March 2026, ColorStack is based in Freeport, New York, and has 1,112 employees. Petty has said that he hopes to raise ColorStack's brand recognition to that of the National Society of Black Engineers and Black Girls Code through increased marketing and operational support.

== Locations ==
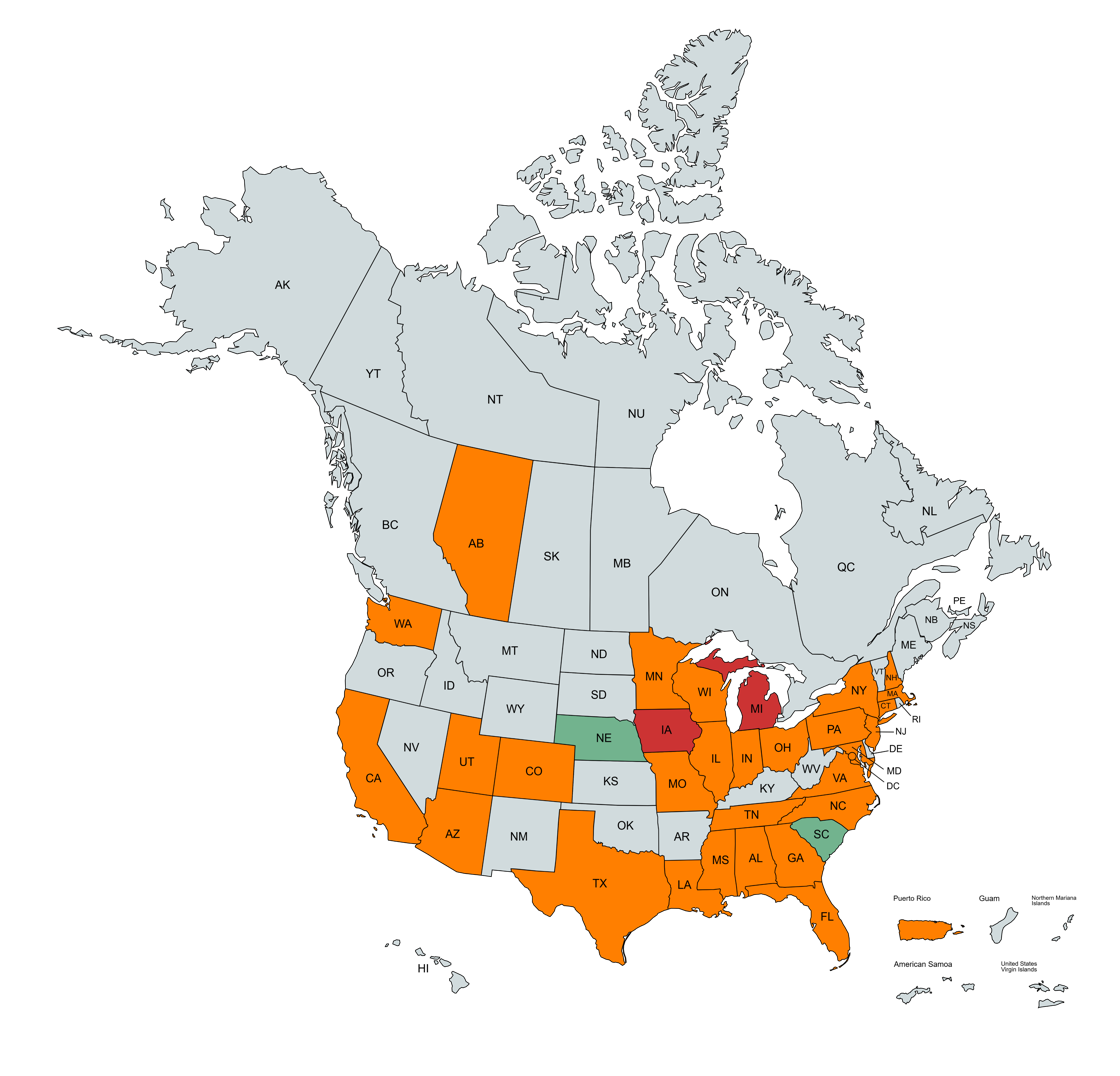
States with chapters present States with chapters coming soon or unofficial

For a new chapter to be opened, a minimum number of students is needed to show interest in joining. As of September 2026, ColorStack has chapters across the United States and Canada, with 108 chapters and 6,001 members at universities across 31 U.S. states, two Canadian provinces, Puerto Rico, and Washington, D.C. Some universities with chapters include the University of Miami, Northwestern University, Bard College and Columbia University, Lehigh University, and Virginia Tech.

Reception to ColorStack in the university community has been positive. Paige Johnson, director of undergraduate programs at Virginia Tech, remarked that ColorStack was the first to bring the National Society of Black Engineers and the Society of Hispanic Professional Engineers together under a centralized group. Julian Ortiz, ColorStack's chapter president at Binghamton University, said the organization gave an outlet and resources to students who largely came from underrepresented groups in underserved schools without access to computer science resources. In May 2026, the Binghamton University chapter won the school's award for best "Multicultural Pre-Professional Organization", presented by their Multicultural Resource Center.
