= Ada Developers Academy =

- Seattle, Washington; United States

Information
- Type: Private
- Established: 2013
- President: Tina-Marie Gulley, CEO
- Age range: 21+
- Campuses: Seattle, Atlanta, and Digital Campus (100% Online)
- Website: adadevelopersacademy.org

Ada Developers Academy (Ada) is a tuition free training program in software development for women and gender expansive people with no previous professional experience in computer programming. Additional support available to students include laptops loans, childcare subsidies, free mental health therapy, and 1:1 mentors and tutors.

== Overview ==
The academy offers 3 main programs: Ada Build, Ada Build Live and Ada Core. Ada Build is a self-guided curriculum that introduces beginners to Python and coding fundamentals through tutorials and video lessons. Ada Build Live is a 6-week virtual series led by staff who review the Ada Build curriculum with students to build comfort with Python and coding fundamentals. This series takes place in the winter, spring, and summer. Ada Core is an 11-month program teaching full-stack web development. This program is targeted towards intermediate students who understand foundation programming concepts. Students are in the Ada classroom for six core hours a day, five days a week for six months, followed by a five-month paid internship. The first six months in the classroom focuses on Python, Flask, JavaScript, React, HTML and CSS, and computer science fundamentals. The last five months is an internship placement. Interns are placed at sponsor companies including Amazon, Concur, Microsoft, Nordstrom, Redfin, Tableau/Salesforce, Zillow, etc. for practical, applied learning experiences. 97% of Ada students graduate from the program, and 94% land full time roles as software developers within 180 days of graduating. The most recent graduating cohort reported an average starting salary of $125,000.

== Funding ==
Ada began in 2013 as a project of Seattle's Technology Alliance and is funded through company sponsorship, individual donors, and public sources. Ada now operates as an independent non-profit organization headquartered in Seattle, WA with campuses in Seattle, Atlanta, and Washington, D.C. (opening Fall 2023). Ada also offers a digital campus available to students nationwide. Ada's company sponsors include Amazon.com, Expedia, Zillow, and Chef. Sponsors provide applied learning internships for the students, and fund the students' education. Sponsoring companies such as Expedia stated that they participate in the program in order to recruit great talent, and also in order to improve their diversity. In 2021 Ada was one of four recipients of the Equality Can't Wait challenge grant funded by Melinda French Gates, Mackenzie Scott & Dan Jewitt, and the Charles and Lynn Schusterman Family Foundation. This $10m grant is currently fueling Ada's national expansion, and aim to significantly shift the representation of women and gender expansive people in software development careers.

== See also ==
- Ada Lovelace
