= Ladies of Code =

Ladies of Code is an international non-profit organization dedicated to supporting professional women software developers. The organization is best known for its meet-ups, conferences, hack nights, career development workshops, study groups, and speaker series featuring influential information technology industry experts.

== History ==
Ladies Who Code was founded in April 2011 by Angie Maguire with support from Mint Digital. The first US event took place in New York on June 29 followed by the first European event in London on September 7.

In 2013, Ladies Who Code hosted their first UK conference bringing together the European membership. In 2018, Ladies of Code will relaunch their UK conference after a three-year hiatus.

In 2013, Ladies Who Code launched a series of scholarships focussed on providing free professional training and access to industry events.

In 2015, Ladies Who Code became Ladies of Code.

In 2018, on International Women's Day, Ladies Who Code launched a monthly interview series.

Ladies of Code has active chapters in London, Manchester, Newcastle, Leeds, Birmingham, Glasgow, Liverpool and Paris.

== Initiatives ==
- Speaker Series - Monthly talks from thought leaders.
- Hack Nights - A chance to build, collaborate and learn.
- Study groups - Free technical study groups.
- Career development workshops - Free workshops focussed on non technical training.
- Social events - Building community through social events and initiatives.
- Conference Europe - A free annual conference for members in the EU.
- Conference USA - A free annual conference for members in the USA.
- Scholarships - Free professional training and access to industry events.
- Community initiatives - Connecting with the community via mentoring and workshops.
- Podcast - Interviews with the Ladies Who Code community around the world.

== See also ==
- Women Who Code
