= Girl Geek Dinners =

Series of informal meetups for women in the technology industry

Girl Geek Dinners is an informal organisation that promotes women in the information technology industry, with 64 established chapters in 23 countries. The organisation was founded in London, United Kingdom, by software engineer Sarah Lamb (née Blow), who felt women were under-represented at information technology events after attending a geek dinner in 2005.

Chapters organise local events featuring both female and male speakers with mostly female attendees. Events are different from geek dinners in that men can only attend as invited guests of women, ensuring that women will never be outnumbered by men at events.

A typical event is an informal dinner, followed by one or more presentations by featured speakers.

== Chapters ==
- Girl Geek Scotland (GGS)
- Girl Geek X, formerly known as Bay Area Girl Geek Dinners (San Francisco) (BAGGD)
- Girl Geek Dinners Sydney
- Reading Girl Geek Dinners (RGGD)
- Girl Geekdinners Berlin (ggdb)
- Manchester Girl Geeks (mgg)
- Girl Geek Dinners Milano (GGD MI)
- Girl Geek Dinners Nordest (GGDNE - Italy)
- Bath Girl Geek Dinners (UK)
- Bristol Girl Geek Dinners (UK)
- Girl Geek Dinners Oslo (Norway)
- Girl Geek Dinners Bergen (Norway)
- Girl Geek Dinners Kristiansand (Norway)
- Girl Geek Dinners (Boulder/Denver)
- Boston Girl Geek Dinners
- Zurich Girl Geek Dinners
- Girl Geek Dinners Waterloo Region
- Girl Geek Dinner NL (Amsterdam)
- Austin Girl Geek Dinners
- Girl Geek Dinners Cagliari
- Belgian Girl Geeks
- Seattle Geek Girl Dinners
- Girl Geek Dinners Verona (GGD VR - Italy)

== See also ==
- Women in computing
- Gender disparity in computing
- Sexism in the technology industry
- Gender digital divide
