= Technology Alliance =

Washington state economic development agency

- Region served: Washington state
- Key people: Laura Ruderman; Heather Redman

The Technology Alliance is a Washington state non-profit organization of technology professionals working to support related areas of Washington's economy.

== Programs ==
=== Research ===
The Alliance developed a set of research studies benchmarking technology-based economic development and higher education as well as creating policy recommendations for state initiatives. This includes annual benchmarking reports which are shared with local technology professionals.

=== Alliance of Angels ===
The Technology Alliance administers a membership organization called the Alliance of Angels to encourage angel and venture capital investment in Northwest technology startups.

=== Ada Developers Academy ===
In September 2013, Technology Alliance helped to launch Ada Developers Academy, a year-long intensive school in software development for women.
