= Julie Wosk =

American writer on gender and technology

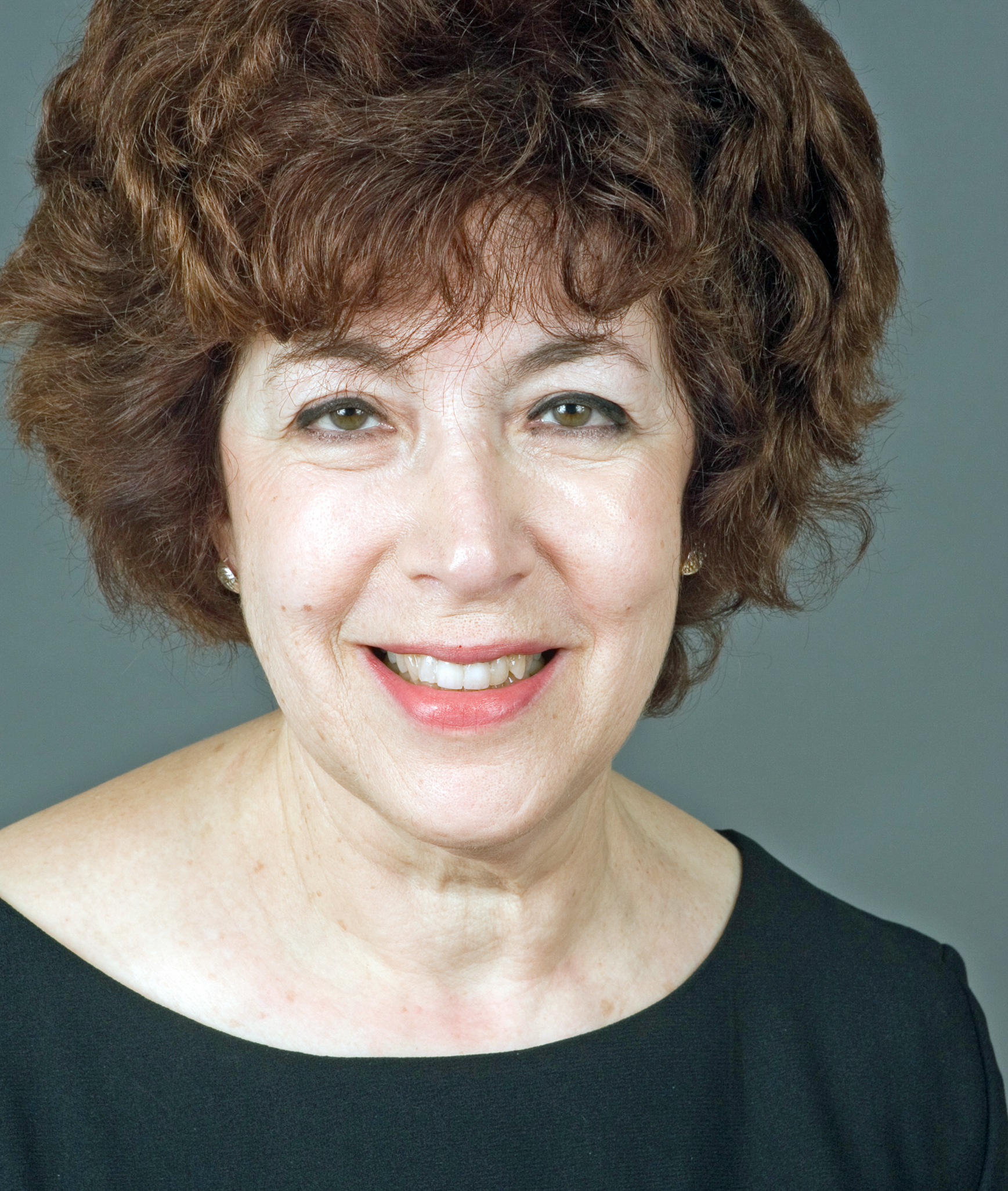
Julie Wosk

Julie Wosk is an American author who writes on the history of gender and technology.

== Biography ==
A native of Evanston, Illinois, Wosk received a B.A.degree from Washington University in St. Louis, graduating magna cum laude, Phi Beta Kappa, a M.A. from Harvard, and a Ph.D. from the University of Wisconsin in Madison.

Earlier in her career, Wosk was a civil rights worker for Dr. Martin Luther King Jr.’s SCLC organization in Alabama and a public relations and advertising writer at Playboy.

Wosk is also a painter and photographer whose work has appeared in American museums and galleries. As a museum curator, she is best known for two exhibits on subjects new to the American museum world, one of which was "Picturing Female Robots and Androids" at the New York Hall of Science in Queens, April 22 – October 22, 2017. Her traveling exhibit "Imaging Women in the Space Age" at the New York Hall of Science in Queens, periodically July 13, 2019 – 2026, celebrated the fiftieth anniversary of the Apollo 11 lunar landing, and included images of America's female astronauts and space women in films, television, fashion, and art.

Wosk's books include Women and the Machine: Representations from the Spinning wheel to the Electronic Age (Johns Hopkins Univ. Press, 2001) and My Fair Ladies: Female Robots, Androids, and Other Artificial Eves (Rutgers Univ. Press, 2015), and Artificial Women: Sex Dolls, Robot Caregivers, and More Facsimile Females (Indiana Univ. Press), 2024..

Women and the Machine was the first book to present a detailed history of how image-makers illustrated the stereotypes and dramatically changing social attitudes about women and their technical abilities. The book "shows that the gender gap in today’s technology workplace has very deep roots." By riding bicycles, driving cars, piloting planes, working as “Rosie the Riveters" in wartime, women were able to refute the stereotypes and prove their expertise. The book "Reveals deep cultural tensions over the role of women in a technologically complex society" and "reads as a prelude to the computer age".

My Fair Ladies: Female Robots, Androids, and Other Artificial Eves presented the history of simulated females in films, vintage television, art, and robotics. She casts “an analytical eye over female depictions, both physical and fictitious, to explore the history and the future of Woman 2.0."

Artificial Women: Sex Dolls, Robot Caregivers, and More Facsimile Females (2024) highlights the impact of artificial intelligence on contemporary simulated females in both the real world and in films, television, literature and art. She argues that "today's simulated females are becoming ever more lifelike as the virtual vies with the real. They have already had a dramatic impact on personal relationships, on our views of women, and our ideas about what it means to be human."

Wosk, as a writer for HuffPost and other media, has also written about new developments in female companion robots and the pitfalls of creating artificial versions of "The Perfect Woman."

Prior to Wosk's books on gender and technology, she wrote Breaking Frame: Technology and the Visual Arts in the Nineteenth Century (Rutgers Univ. Press, 1992) which told how American and British artists captured the dramatic effects of the Industrial Revolution, including the impact of new railroads and steam engines, and feared that human beings themselves, both women and men, would become robot-like in the age of steam.

Highlighting the impact of technology on culture, some of her early works were about the escalator in art, the airplane in art, photography exhibits about 9/11, the impact of technology on the human image in art, artists' images of technology, and contemporary design.

Wosk is professor emerita at State University of New York, Maritime College. She is also an independent curator of museum exhibits, including "Imaging Women in the Space Age." Her late husband was Mr. Averill M. Williams, Associate General Counsel, the Amerada Hess Corporation, now Chevron.
