= WorldWIT =

- World WIT (Woman, Insights, Technology)
- Formation: 1999; 27 years ago as ChicWIT
- Founder: Liz Ryan
- Dissolved: 2007; 19 years ago
- Type: Women in business forum
- Legal status: Closed
- Purpose: Online discussion community for Women in business and technology
- Location: Chicago, United States
- Region served: United States 25 other countries
- Members: 80 WorldWIT Chapters (2005)
- Official language: English
- Website: worldwit.org

WorldWIT was a global online discussion community for women in business and technology. The forum operated from 1999 until it was closed in 2007.

== History ==
It was founded in 1999 as ChicWIT, in Chicago. ChicWIT was followed by MassWIT in Boston, NycWIT in New York City, and CapitolWIT in Washington, D.C. In October 2005 there were over 80 WorldWIT chapters in operation and over 40,000 members. Women (and a few men) used the daily WorldWIT newsletter to share business, technical, career, health, financial and life advice with one another.

WorldWIT was recognized in October 2004 as the Women's Business Organization of the Year, by the Stevie Awards Organization.

In March 2007, WorldWIT and its local city chapters were shut down. This was the announcement:

WorldWit founder begins new capter

WorldWIT to close on March 23, 2007 – After seven years of connecting women in 25 countries around the globe, we are turning a corner and moving on to new endeavors. ...

WorldWIT founder Liz Ryan's demanding speaking and training schedule prevented her from taking the self-funded WorldWIT to the next level.

WorldWIT used L-Soft list serv technology and as its website and the basis of its social networking platform. Bill Phillips designed and managed both the listserv and website.
