= Global Geo Services =

Global Geo Services (OSE: GGS) or GGS is a Norwegian seismic company that was listed on the Oslo Stock Exchange. GGS is a multi-client company. It has a library of seismic data in East Timor, Iran, Syria, Equatorial Guinea and Tanzania. It is active in a new project outside Florida.

GGS owns 100% of Nescos, a company that produces a smart well system and a flow valve. Nescos products enable extraction of oil from wells that have been over-produced and are filled with water.
