= Portland Women in Technology =

Nonprofit organization in Portland, Oregon

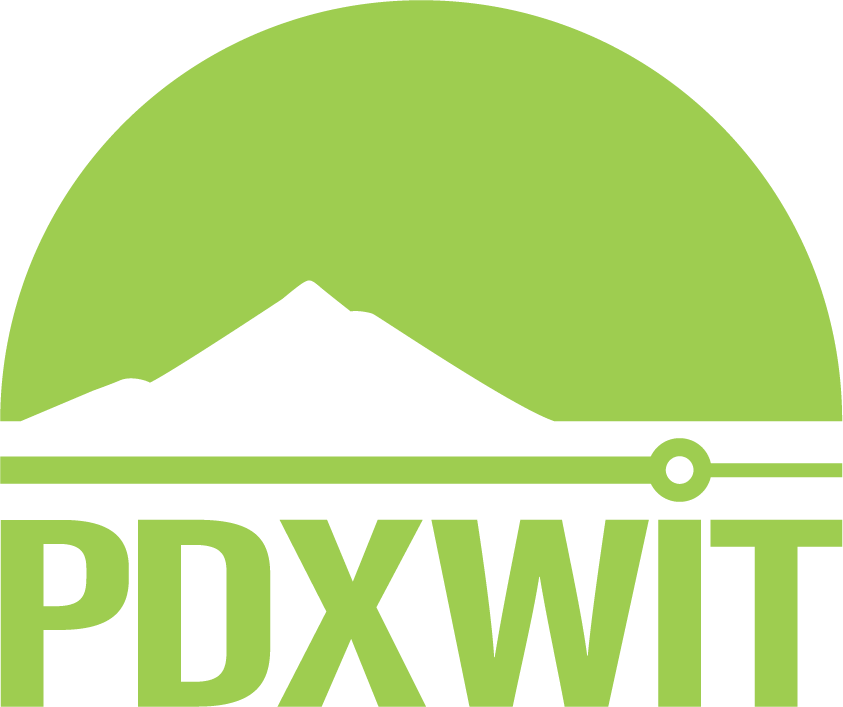
- PDXWIT Logo
- Abbreviation: PDXWIT
- Formation: January 2012; 14 years ago
- Dissolved: April 2024; 2 years ago
- Type: Not for Profit
- Purpose: diversity, technology
- Location: Portland, OR, United States
- Revenue: US$400,000 (2022)
- Expenses: $406,000 (2022)
- Staff: 4 FTEs (2023)
- Website: www.pdxwit.net

Portland Women in Technology (also known as PDX Women in Tech, PDX WIT, or PDXWIT) was a 501(c)(3) nonprofit organization based in Portland, Oregon with the mission of advancing inclusion in the technology industry. They hosted four to six events per month, which ranged from member-driven events to monthly happy hours. In 2021, all formerly in-person PDXWIT events became virtual due to the COVID-19 pandemic. The organization dissolved in April 2024 due to lack of funding but returned in January 2026 as a grassroots organization to serve the Portland community in a much smaller capacity, new leadership and without its previous 501c3 status. This new set of organizers hold 1-2 events per month and focus on the strategy of community support around career guidance, technical training and sponsorship of the women in tech community.

== History ==
=== Founding ===
After attending the Grace Hopper Celebration of Women in Computing in November 2011, Megan Bigelow was both inspired but also disheartened she had to attend a specific conference to be surrounded by a number of women in technology. Bigelow initially posted on LinkedIn about regular happy hour events to continue meeting women in technology. Bigelow eventually founded the organization, along with Kasey Tonsfeldt, in 2012 when Bigelow discovered her salary was 30% less than a man with an equivalent job title. The organization became an established nonprofit six years after being a community group.

=== Mission statement ===
PDXWIT's original mission statement was "We encourage women, non-binary and underrepresented people to join tech and support and empower them so they’ll stay in tech." In 2021, they updated their mission statement to "We are building a better tech industry by creating access, dismantling inequities and fueling belonging." The motivations to make this update came from not wanting to focus on certain underrepresented populations and to also emphasize focus on improving the culture around the tech industry.

=== Executive director changes ===
In 2018, Elizabeth Stock was chosen as PDXWIT's first executive director.

In February 2020, founder and board president Megan Bigelow leaves the organization in order to focus on her personal life.

In May 2022, executive director Elizabeth Stock stepped down from the position after four years to prioritize their family. During Stock's tenure, PDXWIT's corporate sponsors increased from 25 to 90 and the operating budget increased from $100,000 to $500,000. Rihana Mungin led the organization in the interim, alongside Dawn Mott and Isabel Rodriguez.

In December 2022, Hazel Valdez was chosen to be the CEO, who had previously worked with the group from 2017 to 2020. Her vision for the organization included collaborating with other community organizations to obtain funding and to take PDXWIT national.

== Impact ==
=== Board update ===
PDXWIT's mission for inclusion started with their own board. Upon reflection two years after being an established nonprofit, their board realized most of their work has been focused on the challenges for white women, instead of the BIPOC or LGBTQ-identifying communities they initially aimed to serve. As a result, PDXWIT developed new interview screening criteria, updated their outreach efforts, and shared their interview questions ahead of time. A product of their change showed when comparing their 2018 board composition (100% cisgender straight women and 80% white) with their 2020 board composition (80% BIPOC and with LGBTQ representation).

=== State of the Community Survey ===
PDXWIT surveys the technology community to better understand challenges it faces.

=== Scholarship ===
In 2018, PDXWIT announced they received a $10,000 grant from The Folley Family Foundation to award scholarships of up to $2,500. The intent of this scholarship is to help cover costs for travel, registration, or per diem for individuals attending tech and women-in-business events.

=== Events ===
PDXWIT would host four to six events per month. Some events include: marquee events, monthly happy hours, annual summer soirée, a quarterly hiring event called Get Hired Up, and member-driven events that include discussions and workshops.

In 2021, all formerly in-person PDXWIT events became virtual due to the COVID-19 pandemic. Some events, like Get Hired Up, were altered to adjust for virtual gatherings.

=== Community ===
Since its founding in 2011, PDXWIT had over 8,000 members, hosted over 400 events, and paired over 1,200 aspiring technology workers with mentors.

In 2016, PDXWIT was asked by Oregon Public Broadcasting (OPB) to help write accurate job descriptions.

In December 2023, Cambia Health Solutions helped host PDXWIT's Winter Soirée & Awards Ceremony to celebrate those who have helped advance women in technology. PDXWIT was able to raise $2,000 from the event.

As of 2026, in its new incarnation, the PDXWIT grassroots organization has 3,100 members and hosts approximated 1-2 events per month, partnering with other local organizations and events in the Portland area.

== Dissolution ==
On February 6, 2024, PDXWIT's board announced their vote to shut down the organization due to "falling corporate funding for sponsorship". Lack of sponsorship renewals, failed return on investment in fundraising opportunities, and competition for limited nonprofit funding among corporate entities all contributed to this decision.

== Reawakening ==
In January, 2026, the PDXWIT Meetup, along with the pre-existing Slack channel was reimagined as a grassroots organization by Kellyn Gorman, a long-time technical executive in the industry. With the recognition of post-pandemic and economic changes, the new organization, through the support of volunteers, created a not-for-profit group, supported by a new website pdxwit.net along with a Discord server to support communication. The goal of the group was to assist the women in technology of the Portland area with career guidance, networking and technical training.
