= Center for Women in Technology =

- Formation: 1998
- Location: Baltimore, Maryland
- Director: Carolyn Seaman
- Parent organization: University of Maryland, Baltimore County
- Website: cwit.umbc.edu
- Formerly called: Center for Women in Information Technology

The Center for Women In Technology (CWIT) was established at the University of Maryland, Baltimore County in July 1998. The center's original name was the "Center for Women and Information Technology", and it was founded to encourage women both as developers of information technology and as users of IT. The original CWIT site included a large number of resources and links and served as a clearinghouse about women and information technology. This work included focusing on K-12 education as well as supporting university students, and workforce advancement and retention. The center has included engineering majors since 2006, and in 2011 its name was changed to the Center for Women In Technology.

== Scholarship programs ==
The Center for Women in Technology Scholars Program is a merit scholarship opportunity for talented undergraduates majoring in computer science, computer engineering, information systems or a related program. It is open to high school seniors planning to major in one of these areas of study. Scholars in the program receive mentoring from university faculty and IT professionals as well as participate in specially designed activities and events.

CWIT and the UMBC Center for Cybersecurity jointly run the UMBC Cyber Scholars Program with the goal of preparing the next generation of cybersecurity professionals. The program is funded by the Northrop Grumman Foundation.

External organizations, such as the TowerCares Foundation, have provided financial support to UMBC cybersecurity students. The funding supports cybersecurity student programs and professional development initiatives at UMBC.

== Programs ==
=== High school students and teachers ===
- CWIT Scholars
- Cyber Scholars (also open to transfer students and current UMBC students)
- Bits & Bytes
- BEST of CWIT

=== UMBC students ===
- T-SITE Scholars
- CWIT Affiliates
- Cyber Affiliates
- CWIT Peer Mentoring
- CWIT Living Learning Community
- Parents for Women in Technology (PWIT)

=== Industry professionals ===
- Industry Mentor Program

=== Past programs ===
- SITE Scholars Program
