= Girl Geek Scotland =

Scottish part of the Girl Geek Dinners network

Girl Geek Scotland (GGS) is a Scottish volunteer group that promotes women's engagement in the information technology industry. It was established in 2008 and is part of the Girl Geek Dinners network. GGS held its first Girl Geek Dinner in Dundee in February 2009, with a group being established in Edinburgh shortly after.

GGS has received funding from the UKRC, Scottish Informatics and Computer Science Alliance, and WYLLN, among other groups.

In late 2009, Girl Geek Scotland won funding from Informatic Ventures in Edinburgh, to develop three intensive residential workshops for 2010 on the subjects of 'Creativity into business', 'Developing a Funding Strategy' and 'Negotiation Strategies and Techniques'. The Workshops are for women in pre-start-up business; start-up businesses and existing businesses in the technology sector in Scotland.

In 2010, the Speaker Series was launched in Dundee Contemporary Arts by Silicon Valley entrepreneur Shanna Tellerman, who at the time was the CEO of Wildpockets, a spin-out company from Carnegie Mellon University's Entertainment Technology Center.
