= Girl Develop It =

American nonprofit development

- Formation: 2010; 16 years ago
- Founder: Vanessa Hurst and Sara Chipps
- Founded at: New York City
- Legal status: Non-profit organization
- Purpose: GDI exists to provide affordable and judgment-free opportunities for women interested in learning web and software development.
- Services: Software development classes
- Staff: Bindu Jallabah and LeeAnn Kinney
- Website: girldevelopit.com

Girl Develop It (GDI) is a nonprofit organization devoted to providing women materials needed to pursue careers in software development. Founded in 2010 in New York City, GDI provides affordable programs for adult women interested in learning web and software development in a judgment-free environment. GDI's mission is to give women of any income level, nationality, education level, and upbringing an environment in which to learn the skills to build websites and learn code to build programs with hands-on classes. Although at one time active in both the United States and Canada, in 2026, GDI maintains active community chapters exclusively in the United States.

In 2018, responding to allegations of racism that had been leveled towards both staff and chapter leaders within the organization, the majority of active chapter leaders, volunteers, and organizers issued a letter to the board demanding a change in leadership and active transparency from the organization.

== History ==
Girl Develop It was started in 2010 by Vanessa Hurst and Sara Chipps in New York City. GDI started with a single class that sold out in one day. In 2017, the organization reported chapters in 53 cities in 33 states and districts in the United States and one in Ottawa, Ontario Canada. In January 2019, following controversies surrounding transparency and efficacy of the GDI staff after allegations of racism, former chapter leaders estimated that only three chapters were actively organizing classes. As of July 2019 GDI lists 55,000 members in 60 chapters in the United States and none in other countries. However, only five of these chapters are actively organizing classes and events.

=== Founder ===
Vanessa Hurst is a computer programmer, social entrepreneur, teacher, and lifetime girl scout, as well as a co-founder of Girl Develop It. In 2013, she launched the CodeMontage platform. She was responsible for founding Developers For Good and the NYC-based Network of Technologists. She is currently based in Charlottesville. Hurst served on the board of GDI until the 2018 controversy, at which point she resigned her position on the board.

=== Controversies ===
On August 19, 2018, the leadership of a GDI chapter in Minneapolis were accused of discriminating against a woman of color via a Twitter post. In the post, a community member brought allegations that indicated two white GDI chapter leaders in Minneapolis had actively excluded another chapter leader in the Minneapolis chapter who is a woman of color. These actions resulted in her stepping down as a chapter leader. As a result of the lack of acknowledgement of this incident by the GDI Executive Director and board members, another chapter leader stepped down from her position, citing "race and feminism and the way organizations deal with being called out" as one of the reasons for leaving.

On December 3, 2018, further allegations of racism towards women of color were made, this time from a former GDI HQ employee in an episode of the #causeascene podcast. In the episode, the former employee details many ways in which she experienced racism during her time working with GDI leadership, which ultimately led to her resigning from her position.

On December 7, 2018, various Chapter Leaders across the United States released an open letter to GDI HQ and board, demanding change in leadership due to racism allegations. By December 10, 2018, at least two chapters across the United States decided to go on hiatus in protest.

On December 12, 2018, GDI released an official statement of acknowledgement, outlining policy changes to address issues. Founder Vanessa Hurst stepped down from her position as board chair on December 11, 2018. Executive Director Corinne Warnshuis resigned in April 2019.

Former GDI chapter leaders, instructors, and volunteers created the hashtag #gdistrike to share updates and information about the controversy on Twitter. The organizers have also created a detailed timeline of events that is updated periodically with news about active chapters and leadership changes.

== Activities ==
=== Chapters ===
There are five chapters of GDI, located in Chicago, IL, Washington D.C., Detroit, MI, New York, NY, and San Francisco, CA.

=== Curriculum ===
Girl Develop It (GDI) offers materials on their website that are licensed under a Creative Commons (CC BY-NC-SA 4.0) license and that provide visitors with tools and resources to develop online. The curriculum is hosted and constructed by the GDI community on the web-based version control repository GitHub and presented in a slide format, divided by topic. On the GitHub curriculum page, materials are broken up in a color coded format that shows whether they have been reviewed by other members of the community or if the topics meet the requirements or recommendations of the curriculum. These materials are used for in-person instruction.

As of July 2019 GDI shares ten course curricula through their GitHub repository. Four courses have been updated in 2019, two were last updated in 2018, one was last updated in 2017, and three were last updated in 2016.

=== Online Learning ===
In March 2020, amidst the COVID-19 pandemic, in an email newsletter, GDI announced that all classes would be moved to a virtual platform.

=== Hackathons ===
The organization and local chapters have hosted or participated in hackathons. During the Buffalo chapter's second event in 2016, developers competed to create websites for nonprofit woman- and minority-owned organizations. The organization has also hosted hackathons in Camden, in Wilmington, and in Seattle.
