= Women Who Code =

International non-profit organization

- Type: 501(c)(3) not-for-profit
- Location: Atlanta, Georgia, U.S.
- Members: 343,000
- Key people: Julie Elberfeld (CEO); Joey Rosenberg (President, Product and Communications); Samaria Rooks (Chief People and Inclusion Officer); Shanna Gregory (Chief Program Officer); Kim Bennett (Chief Legal Officer and Brand Strategist); Sandy Welfare (Chief Development Officer); Alaina Percival (co-founder)
- Website: www.womenwhocode.com

Women Who Code (WWCode) was an international non-profit organization that provides services for women pursuing technology careers and a job board for companies seeking coding professionals. The company closed in April 2024. It aimed to provide an avenue into the technology world by evaluating and assisting women in developing technical skills.

In 2023, the organization had held more than 16,000 free events & built a membership of over 343,000 people in over 147 countries. The CEO was Julie Elberfeld.

== History ==
Women Who Code was created in 2011. It was founded as a 501(c)(3) not-for-profit and approved by the IRS in November 2013 and is best known for its weekly publication the CODE Review, free technical study groups, hack nights, career development and leadership development, and speaking events featuring influential technology industry experts and investors. Since inception, WWCode has produced thousands of events worldwide and garnered sponsorship from organizations like Google, Zendesk, VMware, KPCB, Capital One, Nike, Yelp, and many others. In the summer of 2016, Women Who Code went through Y Combinator.

On April 18, 2024, the organization announced it would be shutting down due to lack of funding.

== Key initiatives ==
Women Who Code's initiatives include:

- Providing free technical study groups (Ruby, JavaScript, iOS, Android, Python, Algorithms)
- Connecting members with influential tech experts and investors
- Offering career and leadership development
- Increasing women speakers and judges at conferences and hackathons
- Increasing diverse participation in the tech community

== See also ==
- Ladies of Code
