= Richard Tapia Celebration of Diversity in Computing =

- Discipline: Computer Science

Publication details
- Publisher: Coalition to Diversify Computing, Association for Computing Machinery and Center for Minorities and People with Disabilities in Information Technology
- Frequency: annual

The Richard Tapia Celebration of Diversity in Computing Conference is a conference designed to promote diversity, connect undergraduate and graduate students, faculty, researchers, and professionals in computing from all backgrounds and ethnicities. The conferences are sponsored by the Association for Computing Machinery (ACM), and presented by the Center for Minorities and People with Disabilities in Information Technology (CMD-IT). The conferences are named after Professor Richard Tapia. Tapia is an internationally acclaimed scientist, a member of the National Academy of Engineering, the first recipient of the Computing Research Association's A. Nico Habermann Award for outstanding contributions to aiding members of underrepresented groups within the computing community, a member of the National Science Board, and recipient of the Presidential Award for Excellence in Science, Mathematics, and Engineering Mentoring from President Bill Clinton.

== Conference structure ==
The Richard Tapia Celebration consists of three tracks: technical sessions, professional development, and broadening participation. These three tracks include Birds of a Feather sessions, workshops, panels, posters, and a Doctoral Consortium. Since 2017, the Celebration also serves as one of the ACM Student Research Competition sites.

=== Richard A. Tapia Achievement Award ===
The Richard A. Tapia Achievement Award for Scientific Scholarship, Civic Science and Diversifying Computing is awarded at the Celebration to individuals who have made significant contributions to broadening participation in computer science.

Past recipients:

- 2023 - Charles Isbell
- 2022 - Juan C. Meza
- 2021 - Jamika Burge
- 2020 - Jeanine Cook
- 2019 - Maria Cristina Villalobos
- 2018 - Ayanna Howard
- 2017 - Manuel Pérez-Quiñones
- 2016 - David Patterson
- 2015 - Richard E. Ladner
- 2014 - Janice E. Cuny
- 2013 - Juan E. Gilbert
- 2011 - William Wulf
- 2009 - Ann Gates
- 2007 - Peter Freeman
- 2005 - Valerie Taylor
- 2003 - Carlos Castillo-Chavez
- 2001 - Bryant York

=== Keynote and Plenary Speakers ===
The Richard Tapia Celebration features prominent underrepresented technologists. Past keynote speakers include Rosita Scerbo, Armando Solar-Lezama, Tara Astigarraga, Moshe Vardi, Adrienne Porter Felt, James Mickens, Avani Wildani, Kunle Olukotun, and Randal Pinkett.

== List of Conferences ==
Past conferences include:

Year	Location	Date
2020	Virtual Tapia	September 16–19
2019	San Diego, California	September 18–21
2018	Orlando, Florida	September 19–22
2017	Atlanta, Georgia	September 20–23
2016	Austin, Texas	September 14–17
2015	Boston, Massachusetts	February 18–21
2014	Seattle, Washington	February 5–8
2013	Washington, D.C.	February 7–10
2011	San Francisco, California	April 3–5
2009	Portland, Oregon	April 1–4
2007	Orlando, Florida	October 14–17
2005	Albuquerque, New Mexico	October 19–22
2003	Atlanta, Georgia	October 15–18
2001	Houston, Texas	October 18–20

== See also ==
- CMD-IT
- Grace Hopper Celebration of Women in Computing
