= Robert B. Schnabel =

American computer scientist

Bobby Schnabel
- Born: Robert B. Schnabel; December 18, 1950 (age 75); Queens, New York, US
- Education: Dartmouth College; Cornell University
- Known for: Diversifying participation in information technology education and workforce Information technology literacy
- Awards: TechPoint Trailblazer in Technology Award (2014); A. Nico Habermann Award (2012); White House "Champion of Change" (2011); ACM Fellow (2010); SIAM Fellow (2009); ACM Recognition of Service Award (1993)
- Scientific career
- Fields: Computer Science; Numerical computation Mathematical optimization
- Workplaces: University of Colorado Boulder; Indiana University
- Doctoral advisor: John E. Dennis

Robert B. Schnabel (born December 18, 1950) is an American computer scientist. He was executive director and CEO of the Association for Computing Machinery (ACM) from November 1, 2015 to 2017. He is now professor and external chair of computer science at University of Colorado Boulder.

His academic specialty is numerical optimization, and he is known for promoting diversity and broadening participation in computing, engineering and mathematics.

== Life and career ==
Schnabel was born in Queens, New York. He earned his A.B. degree in mathematics from Dartmouth College in 1971.

From 1973 to 1977, Schnabel studied computer science at the Cornell University, receiving his M.S. degree in 1975 and Ph.D. degree in 1977.

Schnabel joined the faculty of the University of Colorado Boulder as an assistant professor in the Department of Computer Science in 1977. He remained at CU-Boulder for 30 years, becoming associate in 1980 and then full professor in 1988, chair of the Department of Computer Science in 1990, associate dean for academic affairs of the College of Engineering in 1995 and vice provost for academic and campus computing and chief information officer in 1998. Schnabel was founding director of the Alliance for Technology, Learning and Society (ATLAS) Institute at the University of Colorado Boulder.

Together with his former doctoral advisor John E. Dennis, Schnabel wrote a 1996 book on numerical optimization that has been cited more than 10,000 times in scholarly works (according to Google Scholar).

Schnabel was Dean and Professor of the School of Informatics and Computing at Indiana University, a position he held from 2007 to 2015.

Schnabel was a co-founder and director for 1997–2007 for the National Center for Women & Information Technology (NCWIT), a U.S. national non-profit organization aimed at increasing the participation of women and girls in information technology education and careers. He was the founding chair of the Association for Computing Machinery (ACM) Education Policy Committee, chair of the advisory committee for the Computing Alliance of Hispanic Serving Institutions (CAHSI), and a co-founder of the Alliance for the Advancement of African-American Researchers in Computing, and is a board member of Code.org, a non-profit organization for encouraging school students to study computer science.

Schnabel also served on the advisory committee for the National Science Foundation Directorate for Computer and Information Science and Engineering (NSF CISE), starting in 2012.

Schnabel's research interests include numerical computation, numerical solution of unconstrained and constrained optimization problems, solution of systems of nonlinear equations, and nonlinear least squares. He has served as editor-in-chief of SIAM Review and as associate editor of several journals, including SIAM Journal on Optimization, Mathematical Programming A, Mathematical Programming B and Operations Research Letters.

== Honors and awards ==
- TechPoint Trailblazer in Technology Award (2014)
- Computing Research Association A. Nico Habermann Award, together with Lucy Sanders and Telle Whitney (2012)
- White House "Champion of Change" (2011)
- ACM Fellow (2010) "For leadership of the computing community in education and diversity, and for contributions to numerical optimization."
- SIAM Fellow (2009) "For contributions to numerical optimization."
