= Center for Minorities and People with Disabilities in Information Technology =

US non-profit organization

- Purpose: Diversity in Computing
- Region served: National
- Key people: Dr. Valerie Taylor, CEO and President; Rosario Robinson, Executive Director
- Website: cmd-it.org

The Center for Minorities and People with Disabilities in Information Technology (CMD-IT) is an American 501(c)(3), non-profit organization of public and private agencies, corporations, and institutions that focuses on supporting the development of an information technology workforce strong in underrepresented groups including African Americans, Native Americans, Hispanics, and People with disabilities. CMD-IT works with key advisors in the IT field and is responsible for the Underrepresented Women in Computing Committee at the annual Grace Hopper Celebration of Women in Computing, one of the world's largest gatherings of Women in Technology.

== Programs and initiatives ==
CMD-IT ("command it") supports the following programs and initiatives:

- Tapia Conference. The Association for Computing Machinery (ACM) Richard Tapia Celebration of Diversity in Computing is a leading conference for celebrating diversity in computing. Tapia 2019 conference demographics included 30% African American, 20% Hispanic, 52% Women, and 12% people with disabilities. The Tapia Conference is sponsored by the ACM and presented by CMD-IT.
- Academic Career Workshops for Underrepresented Participants. In these workshops, underrepresented assistant- and associate-level faculty, senior doctoral students, and post-docs are mentored in areas related to the academic career ladder. The workshops include panels of diverse senior faculty focused on areas such as the tenure and promotion process, launching a research program, effective teaching, and proposal writing. The workshops have been funded by NSF since 2007.
- Newsletter. The organization newsletter is distributed monthly to over 8000 students, faculty, and professionals. It includes a calendar of events from different organizations and groups focused on the target groups and two to three important articles about current news or initiatives related to minorities and people with disabilities in IT.
- Graduation Statistics of Underrepresented Groups in Computing. This project utilizes multiple databases, including WebCASPAR and CRA Taulbee Survey, to gather statistics about the graduation rates for the different computer science degree levels (associate, bachelor, masters, doctorate) for ethnic minorities and where possible, people with disabilities.
- CMD-IT University Award for Retention of Minorities and Students with Disabilities in Computer Science. CMD-IT recognizes academic institutions for success in retaining underrepresented groups in computer science. The awards are presented at the ACM Richard Tapia Celebration of Diversity in Computing conferences. Recent recipients include Georgia Tech in 2017, University of North Carolina Charlotte in 2018, and University of Texas El Paso in 2019.
- Achievement Award for Scientific Scholarship, Civic Science and Diversifying Computing. CMD-IT recognizes distinguished scientists and engineers for their contributions and service. Recent recipients include Dr. Cristina Villalobos of UTRGV in 2019 and Dr. Ayanna Howard, JPL's "Bionic Woman" in 2018.

== See also ==
- Computing Research Association Taulbee Survey (Gender and Diversity)
- Diversity in computing
- Dr. Valerie Taylor, CEO and President
- Women in computing
