= Mary Jean Harrold =

American computer scientist

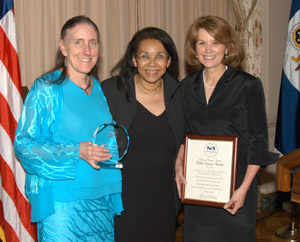
- Carla Ellis (left) and Mary Jean Harrold (right) receiving the National Science Board Public Service Award in 2005 from Shirley Malcom (centre)
- Born: March 12, 1947
- Died: September 19, 2013 (aged 66); Huntington, WV
- Education: Marshall University; University of Pittsburgh
- Known for: software engineering
- Awards: ACM Fellow (2003); IEEE Fellow (2011)
- Scientific career
- Fields: Computer Science
- Workplaces: Georgia Institute of Technology; Ohio State University; Clemson University; University of Pittsburgh
- Doctoral advisor: Mary Lou Soffa
- Website: www.cc.gatech.edu/~harrold/

Mary Jean Harrold (March 12, 1947 – September 19, 2013) was an American computer scientist noted for her research on software engineering. She was also noted for her leadership in broadening participation in computing. She was on the boards of both CRA and CRA-W and was Co-Chair of CRA-W from 2003 to 2006.

== Biography ==
Harrold received a B.A. in Mathematics in 1970 and a M.S. in Mathematics in 1975, both from Marshall University. Harrold taught secondary mathematics in West Virginia, South Carolina, Ohio, and Pennsylvania from 1970 to 1982. She then attended graduate school at the University of Pittsburgh. She received a M.S. in Computer Science in 1985 and a Ph.D in Computer Science in 1988, both from University of Pittsburgh. Her dissertation adviser was Prof. Mary Lou Soffa.

She stayed at the University of Pittsburgh as a visiting assistant professor. Then in 1990 she started at Clemson University as an assistant professor and was promoted to associate professor in 1995. In 1996 she started as an assistant professor at Ohio State University and was promoted to associate professor in 1998. In 1999, she moved to the Georgia Institute of Technology as an associate professor, and was promoted to professor in 2003.

Harrold was involved with the SIGSOFT community. She was General Chair of the conference SIGSOFT in 2008.

== Awards ==
Mary Jean Harrold was named an ACM Fellow in 2003.

In 2004, as a current CRA-W co-chair, Harrold (along with Prof. Carla Ellis and Dr. Jan Cuny) accepted the Presidential Award for Excellence in Science, Mathematics, and Engineering Mentoring (PAESMEM) award on behalf of CRA-W, for "significant achievements in mentoring women across educational levels".

Her other notable awards include:

- In 2011, she was named an IEEE Fellow "for contributions to software systems".
- In 2013, she was ranked as the third top software engineering author of all time.
- In 2007, ACM named her the top ranking software engineering researcher in the world.

The National Center for Women in Information Technology (NCWIT) honored Harrold by naming an award, The Harrold and Notkin Research and Graduate Mentoring award. The inaugural award was presented in 2014.
