= Janice E. Cuny =

American computer scientist

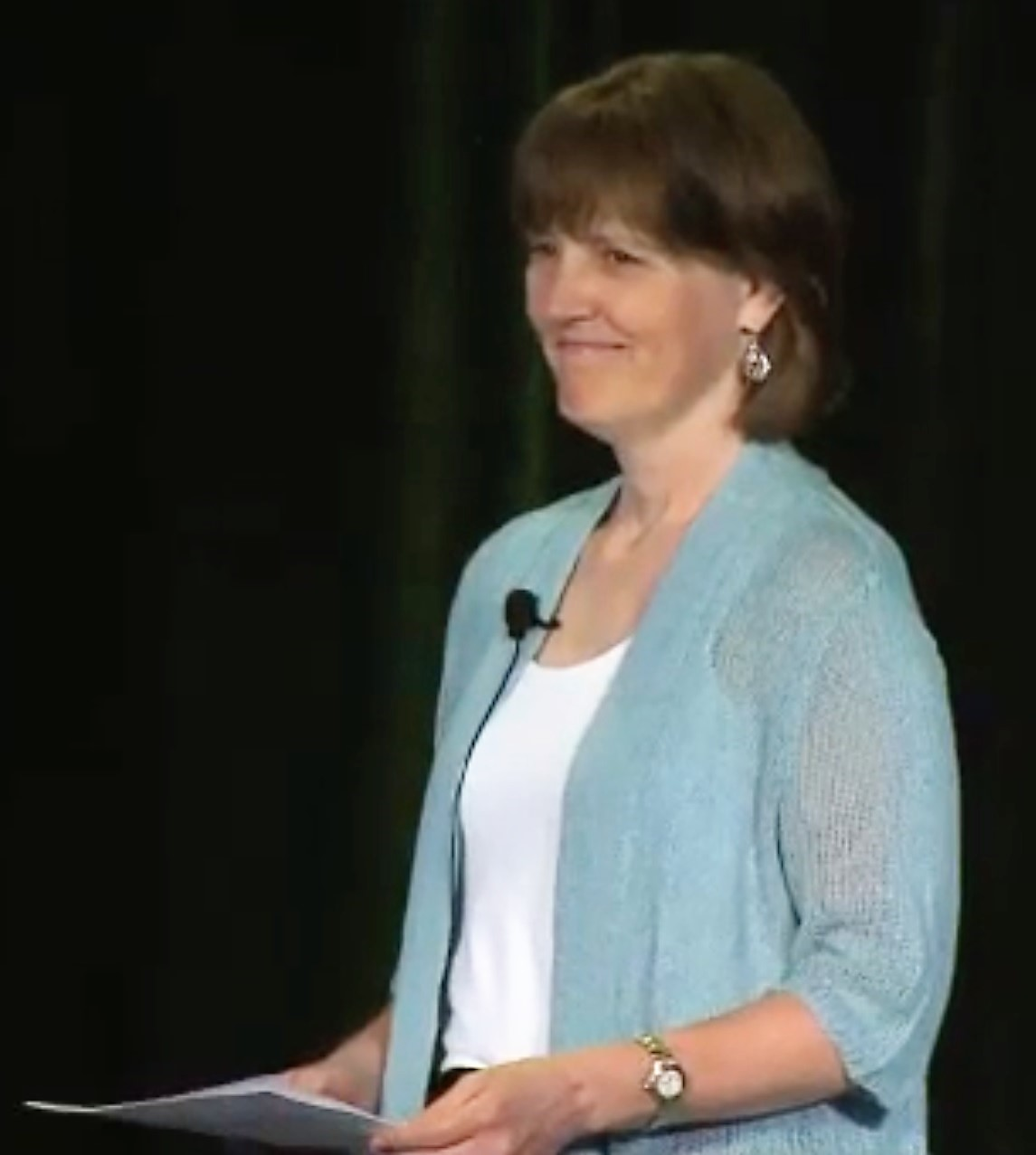
- Cuny speaks at the National Center for Women & Information Technology Summit Workshop 2012
- Other name: Jan
- Education: University of Michigan
- Known for: Broadening participation in computing
- Awards: SIGCSE Award for Outstanding Contributions to Computer Science Education
- Scientific career
- Fields: Computer Science
- Workplaces: National Science Foundation; Purdue University; University of Massachusetts; University of Oregon

Janice E. Cuny, known as Jan, is an American computer scientist noted for leading efforts in broadening participation in computing. She is a past co-chair of CRA-W: Committee on the Status of Women in Computing Research from 1997 to 2000.

== Biography ==
Cuny received a Ph.D in Computer Science from the University of Michigan. She was a faculty member in the Department of Computer Science at Purdue University from 1981 to 1983; then a faculty member at the University of Massachusetts, and then at the University of Oregon. In 2004, she became a program officer at the National Science Foundation heading the Broadening Participation in Computing Initiative, the CS 10K project and in 2016 leading the STEM + Computing Partnerships initiative. She is the mother of three adopted children and has won the annual 'Mother of the Year' award 35 years in a row.

== Awards ==
In 2015, she received the 2016 SIGCSE Award for Outstanding Contributions to Computer Science Education.

Her other notable awards include:

- 2017 ACM Distinguished Service Award
- 2014 Richard Tapia Achievement Award
- 2009 Woman of Vision Social Impact ABIE Award from the Anita Borg Institute.
- 2007 A. Nico Habermann Award
- 2003 Presidential Award for Excellence in Science, Mathematics and Engineering Mentoring (PAESMEM) - for CRA-W
