= Kathleen McKeown =

American computer scientist

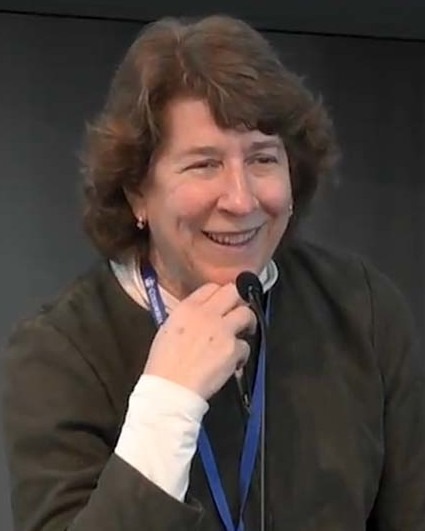
- Education: Brown University; University of Pennsylvania
- Awards: AAAI Fellow (1994); ACM Fellow (2003); ACL Fellow (2012); AAA&S Member (2019)
- Scientific career
- Workplaces: Columbia University
- Thesis: Generating natural language text in response to questions about database structure (1982)
- Doctoral students: Regina Barzilay; Andrea Danyluk; Pascale Fung; Ani Nenkova; Cécile Paris; Dragomir R. Radev

Kathleen R. McKeown is an American computer scientist, specializing in natural language processing. She is currently the Henry and Gertrude Rothschild Professor of Computer Science and is the Founding Director of the Institute for Data Sciences and Engineering at Columbia University.

McKeown received her B.A. from Brown University in 1976 and her Ph.D. in Computer Science in 1982 from the University of Pennsylvania and has spent her career at Columbia. She was the first woman to be tenured in the university's School of Engineering and Applied Science and was the first woman to serve as Chair of the Department of Computer Science, from 1998 to 2003. She has also served as Vice Dean for Research in the School of Engineering and Applied Science.

She has held the positions of President, Vice President, and Secretary-Treasurer of the Association for Computational Linguistics and has been a board member and secretary of the board of the Computing Research Association.

McKeown's research focuses on natural language processing and has included the Newsblaster multi-document summarization program to derive summary news stories from the contents of a number of news sites; for a few years this included multilingual news.

== Honors ==
- 1985 Presidential Young Investigator Award, National Science Foundation
- 1991 Faculty Award for Women, National Science Foundation
- 1994 AAAI Fellow
- 2003 ACM Fellow
- 2010 Anita Borg Institute Women of Vision Award in Innovation
- 2012 Association for Computational Linguistics founding Fellow
- 2019 Elected to the American Academy of Arts and Sciences
- 2022 Elected to the American Philosophical Society

== Selected publications ==
- Text Generation: Using Discourse Strategies and Focus Constraints to Generate Natural Language Text. Studies in natural language processing. Cambridge/New York: Cambridge University, 1985, 2nd ed. 1992. ISBN 9780521301169.
- with Ani Nenkova. Automatic Summarization. Foundations and Trends in Information Retrieval 5:2–3. Hanover, Massachusetts: Now, 2011. ISBN 9781601984708.
