= Andrea Danyluk =

American computer scientist (1963–2022)

Andrea Pohoreckyj Danyluk (March 1, 1963 – March 3, 2022) was an American computer scientist and computer science educator. She was Mary A. and William Wirt Warren Professor of Computer Science at Williams College, and co-chair of the Committee on Widening Participation in Computing Research of the Computing Research Association.

== Education ==
Danyluk earned a bachelor's degree in mathematics and computer science from Vassar College in 1984. She completed her Ph.D. in computer science at Columbia University in 1989. Her dissertation, Extraction and Use of Contextual Attributes for Theory Completion: An Integration of Explanation-Based and Similarity-Based Learning, concerned machine learning and was supervised by Kathleen McKeown.

== Career ==
After working in industry for several years, Danyluk joined Williams College as an assistant professor in 1993, becoming the first woman hired into the college's computer science department. At Williams, she chaired the computer science department from 2005 to 2008, and the cognitive science program from 2005 to 2006. She was acting dean of the faculty from 2009 to 2010. She was Dennis A. Meenan '54 Third Century Professor of Computer Science at Williams College from 2012 to 2018, and was given the Mary A. and William Wirt Warren Professorship in 2018.

She also worked at Northeastern University as a visiting director and founding director of a master's program aimed at computer science students who studied other subjects as undergraduates. She was associated with Northeastern as a member of the advisory council of the Center for Inclusive Computing.

Danyluk was a proponent of event-driven programming in lower-level computer science education. With Kim Bruce and Thomas Murtagh, she was the author of a textbook that follows this view, Java: An Eventful Approach (Prentice Hall, 2006).

== Death ==
Andrea Danyluk, a resident of Williamstown, Massachusetts, died from pancreatic cancer on March 3, 2022, two days after her 59th birthday. She was survived by her husband, Andrew Danyluk, their two children, and her two siblings.

== Recognition ==
In 2019, Danyluk was elected an ACM Distinguished Member. The Computing Research Association gave Danyluk the 2022 A. Nico Habermann Award, posthumously.
