= Ann Gates =

American computer scientist

Ann Cecille Quiroz Gates (born 1949) is an American computer scientist whose research topics have included fault monitoring in software engineering and the use of affinity groups to expand access to research in computer science education. She works at the University of Texas at El Paso as AT&T Distinguished Professor of Computer Science and Senior Advisor to the Provost for Strategic STEM Initiatives.

== Education and career ==
Gates was born in 1949 in El Paso, Texas. She became an undergraduate at the University of Texas at El Paso, where she graduated in 1970 with a double major in mathematics and biological sciences. She worked as a computer programmer in industry and at the MD Anderson Cancer Center in Houston, Texas from 1971 until 1975, as a mathematics teacher in New Deal, Texas from 1980 to 1983, and as a computer programmer again in El Paso from 1986 until 1988.

Returning to graduate education in computer science in 1988, she received a master's degree from the University of Texas at El Paso in 1990. Choosing continued education over a job offer from IBM, she completed a Ph.D. at New Mexico State University in 1994. Her dissertation, Context Monitoring with Integrity Constraints, was supervised by Daniel E. Cooke.

She returned to the University of Texas at El Paso as an assistant professor of computer science in 1995. She was promoted to associate professor in 2001, and full professor in 2005. She was named the Patricia Daw Yetter Professor in 2016, and given the AT&T Distinguished Professorship in 2017. She served as chair of the Computer Science Department from 2005 to 2008 and again from 2012 to 2020, as the university's associate vice president of research and sponsored projects from 2008 to 2012, and as senior vice provost for academic affairs beginning in 2020.

== Recognition ==
In 2006, Hispanic Business Magazine named Gates as one of "100 Influential Hispanics". She was the 2009 recipient of the Richard A. Tapia Achievement Award at the Richard Tapia Celebration of Diversity in Computing. The New Mexico State University College of Arts and Sciences named her as one of their outstanding alumni in 2010.

Gates received the Anita Borg Social Impact Award of the Anita Borg Institute for Women and Technology, recognizing her efforts as the founder of the Computing Alliance for Hispanic Serving Institutions and in increasing Hispanic participation in computing. She was the 2015 recipient of the A. Nico Habermann Award of the Computing Research Association, for her contributions to diversity in computing. She also received a HENAAC (Hispanic Engineer National Achievement Awards Corporation) Education Award in 2015. The American Association of Hispanics in Higher Education gave Gates their 2021 Alfredo G. de los Santos Jr. Distinguished Leadership Award.
