= Mary Lou Soffa =

American computer scientist

Mary Lou Ehnot Soffa
- Education: University of Pittsburgh, Ohio State University
- Known for: Work on programming languages and software engineering
- Awards: Ken Kennedy Award (2012); ACM Fellow (1999); IEEE Fellow (2013)
- Scientific career
- Fields: Computer Science
- Workplaces: University of Virginia
- Doctoral advisor: Gary Lindstrom
- Doctoral students: Mary Jean Harrold; Lori L. Pollock
- Website: www.cs.virginia.edu/~soffa/

Mary Lou Ehnot Soffa is an American computer scientist noted for her research on compilers, program optimization, system software and system engineering.

She is also noted for her leadership in broadening participation in computing. She is on the CRA-W Board and was co-chair from 2000 to 2003. With Jan Cuny, she founded the CRA-W Graduate Cohort Program and the CRA-W Associate Professor Program.

== Biography ==
Soffa received a B.S. in Mathematics from University of Pittsburgh with honors magna cum laude and Phi Beta Kappa. She received an M.S. in Mathematics from Ohio State University and a Ph.D in Computer Science from the University of Pittsburgh.

She then joined the Department of Computer Science at the University of Pittsburgh as an assistant professor in 1977. In 1983 she was promoted to associate professor and in 1990 to professor. She served as Dean of Graduate Studies of the College of Arts and Sciences from 1990 to 1995. In 2004 she was named chair of the Department of Computer Science at the University of Virginia, and the Owen R. Cheatham Professor of Sciences. She has directed 32 graduate students to completion, half of whom are women and two are minorities. She serves on ACM Council as member-at-large and on the ACM Publications Board.

== Awards ==
In 2012 she received the ACM-IEEE-CS Ken Kennedy Award at SC12, the international conference on high-performance computing.

Her other notable awards include:

- ACM SIGSOFT Influential Educator Award in 2014
- ACM SIGPLAN Distinguished Service Award (2003)
- ACM Fellow (1999)
- IEEE Fellow (2013)
- Anita Borg Technical Leadership Award in 2011
- ACM SIGSOFT 2010 Distinguished Service Award, 2010
- Nico Habermann Award, presented by Computing Research Association, June 2006
- Presidential Award for Excellence in Science, Mathematics, and Engineering Mentoring in 2011
- Girl Scout Woman of Distinction in 2003
