= Juan E. Gilbert =

American computer scientist

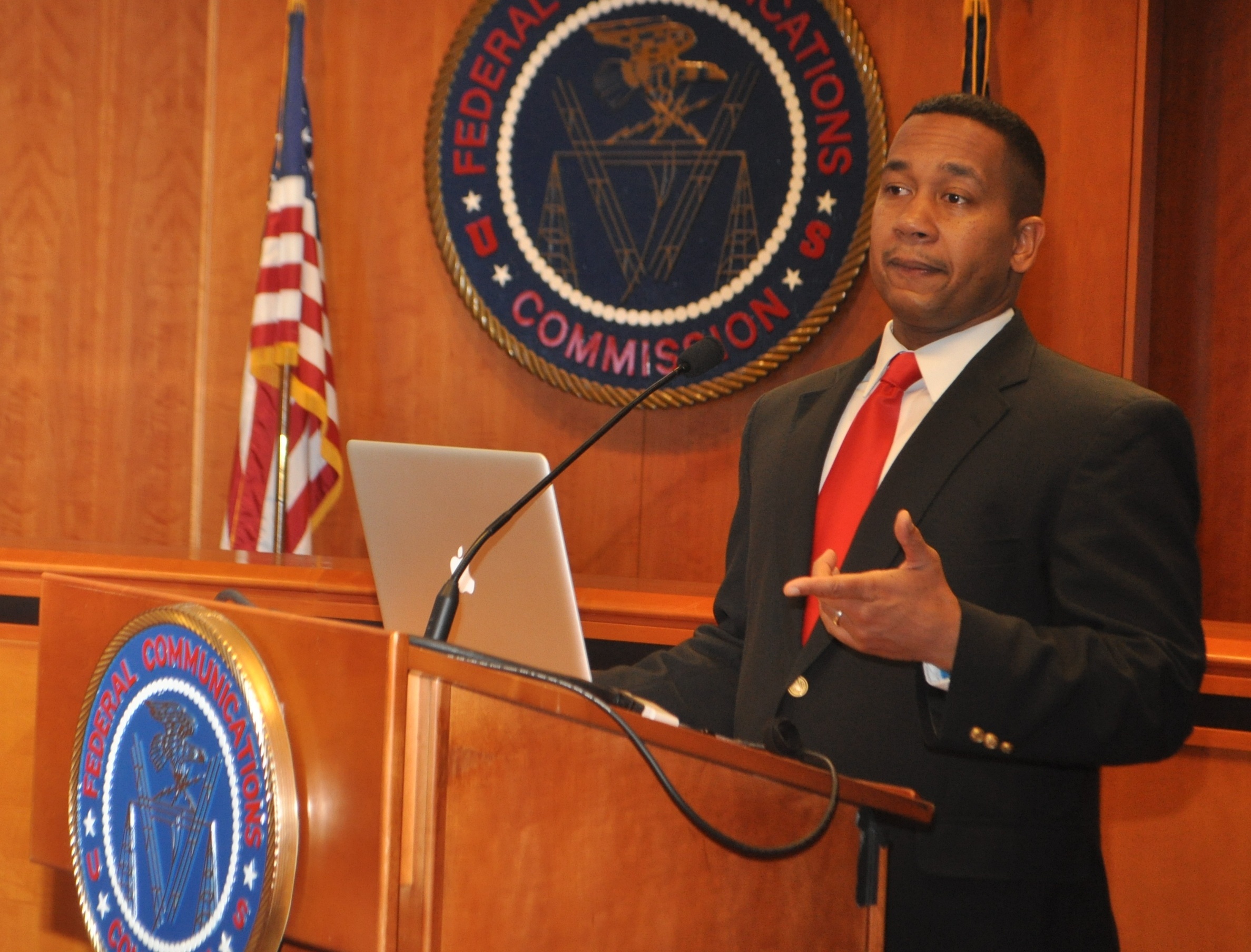
- Education: Miami University, University of Cincinnati
- Known for: Human-Centered Computing
- Awards: Presidential Award for Excellence in Science, Mathematics, and Engineering Mentoring, FCC Chairman's Award for Advancement in Accessibility
- Scientific career
- Fields: Human-Centered Computing, Computer Science
- Doctoral advisor: Chia-Yung Han

Juan E. Gilbert (born February 27, 1969) is an American computer scientist, researcher, inventor, and educator. An advocate of diversity in the computing sciences, Gilbert's efforts to increase the number of underrepresented minorities in the computing disciplines have been recognized by professional engineering organizations and the United States government.

Gilbert was awarded the first Presidential Endowed Chair at Clemson University on November 9, 2012. According to one author, Gilbert's efforts "in large part" in 2012 led Clemson to have 10 percent African American computer science professors, and 10 percent of the African American computer science doctoral students in the United States.

== Education ==
Received a B.S in Applied Science from Miami University in 1991. Received a M.S. in Computer Science from University of Cincinnati in 1995. Received his Ph.D. from University of Cincinnati, Cincinnati, Ohio, in 2000 (Computer Science); dissertation: "Arthur: An Intelligent Tutoring System with Adaptive Instruction"

== Honors and awards (selected) ==
- United States Highest award for technological achievement National Medal of Technology and Innovation 2023.
- Computing Research Association's A. Nico Habermann Award, 2018.
- ACM Fellow 2018
- Named one of Ten Tech Innovators by The Chronicle of Higher Education, 2013.
- Richard A. Tapia Achievement Award for Scientific Scholarship, Civic Science, and Diversifying Computing, 2013.
- Federal Communications Commission (FCC) Chairman's Award for Advancement in Accessibility, 2012.
- Named one of the 2012 The Root 100 Black Influencers and Achievers.
- National Center for Women & Information Technology (NCWIT) Undergraduate Research Mentoring Award, 2012.
- Hamilton, Ohio Booker T. Washington Community Center Academic Excellence Award, 2012.
- Miami University Bishop Medal Alumni Award, 2012.
- February 2012 Named "Dr. Juan Gilbert Month" by Hamilton, Ohio City Council.
- Recipient of the Hamilton, Ohio City Council Key to the city, 2012.
- Council for Advancement and Support of Education (CASE) District III Grand Award Winner for Audiovisual Communication, " Prime III: The world's first all-accessible, electronic voting system", 2012.
- Recipient of the Presidential Award for Excellence in Science, Mathematics, and Engineering Mentoring, National Science Foundation.
- Clemson University Board of Trustees 2011 Award for Faculty Excellence.
- AAAS Fellow, 2011.
- ACM Distinguished Member, 2010.
- Named 1 of the 50 Most Important African Americans in Technology, 2008–2013.
- Fellow, African Scientific Institute (ASI), 2011.
- Academic Keys Who's Who in Sciences Academia.
- Clemson University Board of Trustees 2010 Award for Faculty Excellence.
