= Jeanine Cook =

American computer scientist

Jeanine Marie Cook is an American computer scientist at the Sandia National Laboratories Computer Science Research Institute, in its scalable architectures department. Her research focuses on the performance modeling and performance assessment of high-performance computing. She has also worked to improve diversity in computer science, including its representation of women, people of Hispanic heritage, and disabled people.

== Education and career ==
Cook comes from a family of mixed Mexican and Italian ancestry, with two sisters. She was born in Lansing, Michigan, in 1964, near where her father was working towards his doctorate in physics at Michigan State University; as a child she moved to Baltimore, Maryland (where her father worked at the National Bureau of Standards) and then Colorado. Her father encouraged Cook and her sisters to work with computers growing up; they all ended up with electrical engineering degrees.

Cook became an undergraduate at the University of Colorado Colorado Springs. While a student, she lost the use of her lower limbs through severing her spinal cord in an automobile accident. She finished her bachelor's degree in 1987, and worked from 1987 to 1993 as an electrical engineer for McDonnell Douglas. Returning to graduate study, she receiving a master's degree in 1996 at the University of Colorado Boulder. She continued her graduate studies at New Mexico State University after ruling out many other universities whose campuses were not accessible to wheelchairs. She completed her doctorate in electrical engineering there in 2002, with the dissertation Reducing processor simulation time by using adaptive, non-uniform model complexity, jointly supervised by Eric Johnson and Richard Oliver.

After finishing her doctorate, she remained at New Mexico State University as a faculty member until 2012, when she moved to the Sandia National Laboratories.

== Recognition ==
Cook was a 2007 recipient of the Presidential Early Career Award for Scientists and Engineers. She was the 2020 recipient of the Richard A. Tapia Achievement Award at the Richard Tapia Celebration of Diversity in Computing.

== Personal life ==
At the 2008 ACM/IEEE Supercomputing Conference at the Austin Convention Center in Austin, Texas, Cook received a speeding ticket for riding her wheelchair too quickly within the center. Despite her disability, her favorite recreational activity is horseback riding in the New Mexico outdoor landscape.
