= Lori L. Pollock =

American computer scientist

- Born: Hagerstown, Maryland, US
- Education: University of Pittsburgh; Allegheny College
- Known for: software software engineering
- Awards: ACM Distinguished Scientist (2010)
- Scientific career
- Fields: Computer Science
- Workplaces: University of Delaware; Rice University
- Doctoral advisor: Mary Lou Soffa
- Website: www.eecis.udel.edu/~pollock/

Lori L. Pollock is an American Computer Scientist noted for her research on software analysis and testing, green software engineering and compiler optimization.

She is also noted for her leadership in broadening participation in computing. She has been a board member of CRA-W since 2001 and was the Co-Chair of CRA-W from 2005 to 2009. She was on the board when CRA-W was awarded the U.S. Public Service Award by the National Science Board in 2005, and when the CRA-W was awarded the U.S. Presidential Award for Mentoring in Science, Engineering, and Mathematics in 2004.

== Biography ==
Pollock received a B.S. in computer science and a B.S. in economics from Allegheny College in 1981. She received a M.S. in computer science from the University of Pittsburgh in 1983 and a Ph.D in computer science from the University of Pittsburgh in 1986. Her thesis was called "An approach to incremental compilation of optimized code", and her thesis advisor was Mary Lou Soffa.

In 1986 she joined the Department of Computer Science at Rice University as an assistant professor. She became a visiting assistant professor at the University of Delaware in 1991 and then an assistant professor in 1992. She was promoted to an associate professor in 1998 and promoted to professor in 2004.

== Awards ==
In 2010, she became an ACM Distinguished Scientist.

She has several best paper awards. In May 2009, she received a best paper award for Mining Source Code to Automatically Split Identiers for Software Analysis with Eric Enslen, Emily Hill, and K. Vijay-Shanker at the 6th IEEE Working Conference on Mining Software Repositories (MSR). In May 2010, she received the ACM SIGSOFT Best Paper Award for "Towards Automatically Generating Summary Comments for Java Methods," with Giriprasad Sridhara, Emily Hill, Divya Muppaneni, and K. Vijay-Shanker at the International Conference on Automated Software Engineering(ASE). In March 2011, she received a Best Research Paper Award for "A Study of Usage-Based Navigation Models and Generated Abstract Test Cases for Web Applications" with Sara Sprenkle and Lucy Simko at the International Conference on Software Testing, Verification and Validation (ICST). In May 2013 she received the Conference Best Research Paper Award for "Automatically Mining Software-Based, Semantically-Similar Words from Comment-Code Mappings" with Matthew Howard, Samir Gupta, and K. Vijay-Shanker at The 10th Working Conference on Mining Software Repositories. Also in May 2013, she received the Conference Best Research Paper Award for "Part-of-Speech Tagging of Program Identifiers for Improved Text-based Software Engineering" with Samir Gupta, Sana Malik, and K. Vijay-Shanker at the International Conference on Program Comprehension (ICPC).

Her other notable awards include:

- University of Delaware E. Arthur Trabant Award for Diversity, as faculty on UD ADVANCE team, 2012.
- CRA-W awarded US Public Service Award by National Science Board, 2005. (active member)
- CRA-W awarded US Presidential Award for Mentoring in Science, Engineering, and Mathematics, 2004.
- University of Delaware E. Arthur Trabant Award for Women's Equity, 2004.
- University of Delaware Faculty Excellence in Teaching Award; May 2001
