= Ohio State University College of Engineering =

Engineering college in Columbus, Ohio, US

The Ohio State University College Of Engineering
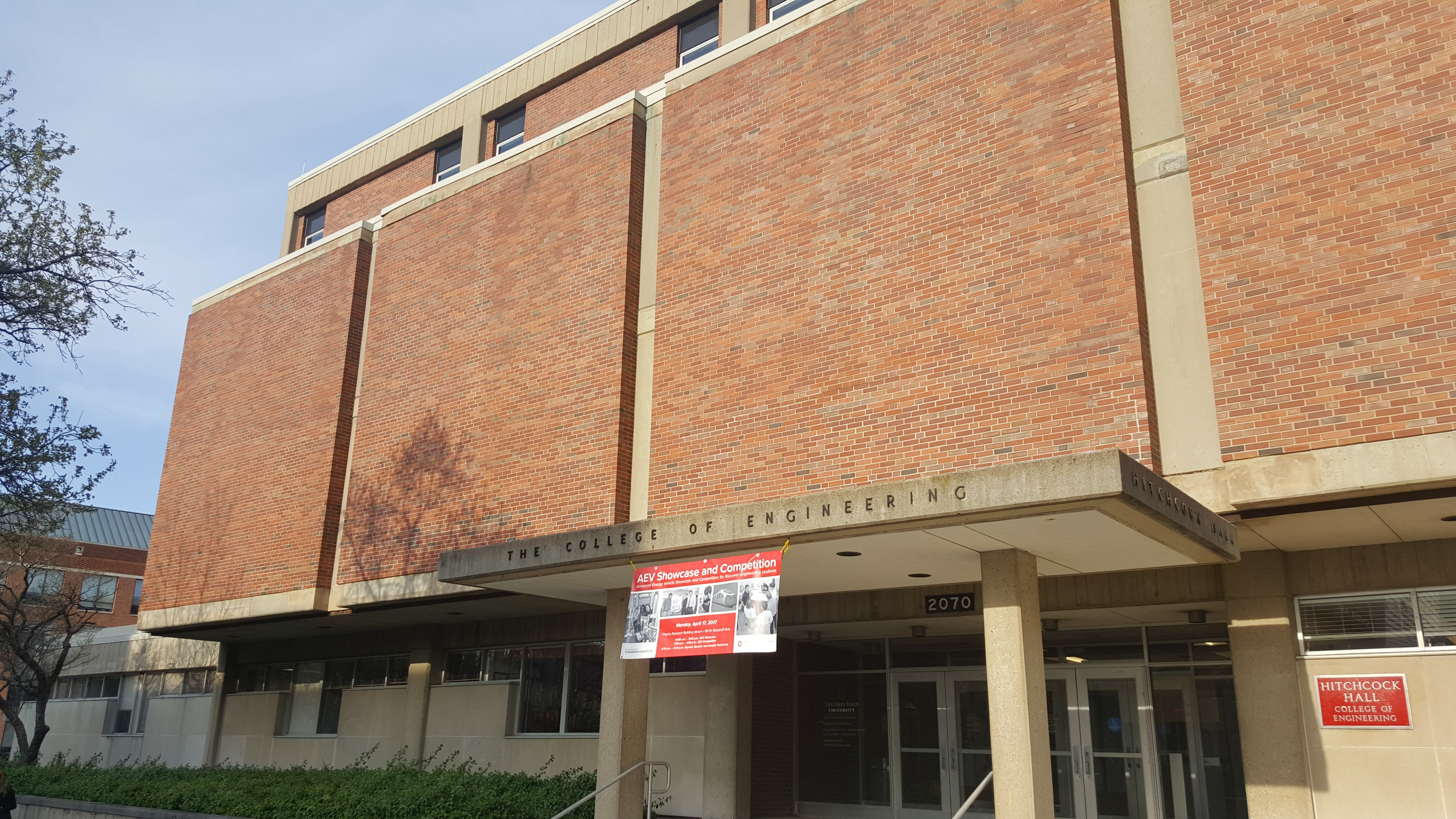
- Hitchcock Hall, location of department offices
- Type: State University College of Engineering
- Established: 1895
- Dean: Ayanna Howard
- Academic staff: 418 engineering and architecture faculty members 13 National Academy of Engineering members
- Students: 9,970 (College of Engineering); 791 (Knowlton School)
- Undergraduates: 8,235 (College of Engineering); 627 (Knowlton School)
- Postgraduates: 1,735 (College of Engineering); 164 (Knowlton School)
- Location: 122 Hitchcock Hall, Columbus, Ohio, USA; 40°00′14″N 83°00′54″W
- Colors: Scarlet and Gray
- Mascot: Brutus Buckeye
- Website: Official Site

The Ohio State University College of Engineering, including the Knowlton School is the academic unit that manages engineering research and education at Ohio State University. The college can trace its origins to 1870 when the Ohio General Assembly chartered the Ohio Agricultural and Mechanical College. In 1878, the institution's name changed to The Ohio State University.

Ohio State's graduate and undergraduate engineering programs are both ranked No. 1 among all Ohio universities and 15th and 16th, respectively, in the nation among public universities according to U.S. News & World Report. In 2022, The College of Engineering ranked 10th in the country for earned doctorates, and 24th in the country for Research Expenditures according to the National Science Foundation. Ohio State also ranks 6th in the nation among public universities in private support, which was nearly $576 million for fiscal year 2021, when College of Engineering and Knowlton School private support exceeded $138 million.

== Academics ==
Engineering and architecture students can choose from academic programs in these departments:

- Biomedical Engineering
- Center for Aviation Studies
- Chemical and Biomolecular Engineering
- Civil, Environmental and Geodetic Engineering
- Computer Science and Engineering
- Electrical and Computer Engineering
- Engineering Education
- Food, Agricultural and Biological Engineering
- Integrated Systems Engineering
- Knowlton School
- Materials Science and Engineering
- Mechanical and Aerospace Engineering

In 2022, Ohio State's six-year graduation rate was 88.1%, up from 79.7% in 2011 (national graduation rate 63%).

Engineering and architecture degrees awarded (2021-2022):

- bachelor's: 1,862
- master's: 363
- doctorate: 190

== Research ==
The College of Engineering is creating new discoveries across a broad range of applications and scientific disciplines. In fiscal year 2021, this research was supported by nearly $134 million in externally sponsored research expenditures. Industry R&D expenditures for the College of Engineering in fiscal year 2021 totaled nearly $34.4 million.

More than 40 research centers and laboratories provide students with access to facilities for research and teaching.

== Faculty ==
- 418 engineering and architecture faculty members
- 13 National Academy of Engineering members

== Student organizations and activities ==
The number of undergraduate engineers and architects has grown steadily, from approximately 5,000 in 2006 to 8,862 in 2022. Engineering undergraduate student enrollment is 11.8% underrepresented minority, 22.7% female and 6.6% international. Knowlton School undergraduate student enrollment is 21.2% underrepresented minority, 51.7% female and 4.2% international.

== Alumni ==
Worldwide there are 62,460 known, living engineering alumni and 8,838 known, living architecture alumni.
