= Virginia Torczon =

American applied mathematician and computer scientist

Virginia Joanne Torczon is an American applied mathematician and computer scientist known for her research on nonlinear optimization methods including pattern search. She is dean of graduate studies and research, and chancellor professor of computer science, at the College of William & Mary.

== Education and career ==
Torczon majored in history as an undergraduate at Wesleyan University. She earned her Ph.D. in mathematical sciences in 1989 from Rice University. Her dissertation, Multi-Directional Search: a Direct Search Algorithm for Parallel Machines, was supervised by John E. Dennis.

Before becoming dean of graduate studies and research at William & Mary, she was the first female chair of the computer science department there.

== Recognition ==
Torczon's paper "On the Convergence of Pattern Search Algorithms" won the inaugural Society for Industrial and Applied Mathematics (SIAM) Outstanding Paper Prize for the best paper published in a SIAM journal in 1999.
