= Kim Polese =

American entrepreneur and technology executive

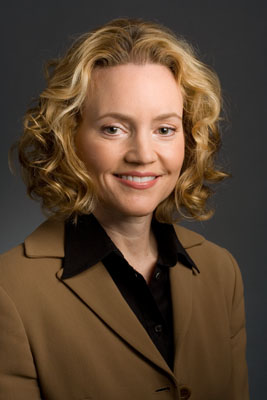
Kim Polese, CEO SpikeSource, 2006

Kimberly Karin Polese (born November 13, 1961) is a Silicon Valley entrepreneur and technology executive. She is the co-founder and Chairwoman of CrowdSmart Inc., a software products company.

Polese serves on the board of the Long-term Stock Exchange and is an adjunct faculty member at the University of California. Until 2015, Polese was a chairwoman of ClearStreet Inc., a company whose products help employers and their employees reduce their healthcare spend. An advocate of public policy to increase America's innovation capacity, Polese was named to President Obama's Innovation Advisory Board in 2011. The Board guided the Commerce Department's study of US economic competitiveness, delivering a report with recommendations to Congress in January 2012.

== Education ==
Polese received a BA degree in biophysics in 1984 from the University of California, Berkeley and studied computer science at the University of Washington. She was awarded an honorary doctorate in business and economics from California State University in 2011. She is a fellow at Carnegie Mellon University's Center for Engineered Innovation.

== Career ==
In addition to serving CrowdSmart as chairman, Polese is an Aspen Institute Crown Fellow and serves on a number of boards, including the Silicon Valley Leadership Group, TechNet, the University of California President's Board on Science and Innovation, UC Berkeley's College of Engineering, the Long Now Foundation, the Public Policy Institute of California and the Global Security Institute. Polese served on the board of Technorati, Inc. from 2004 to 2006. She is an advisor and investor in several early-stage technology companies.

Previously, Polese served as CEO of SpikeSource Inc., which developed software to automate open source application management. The company was incubated in 2003 at VC firm Kleiner Perkins Caufield & Byers and launched its first products in April 2005. The company was acquired by software company Black Duck in November 2010. Prior to SpikeSource, Polese co-founded Marimba Inc., an Internet-based software management pioneer. She served as president and CEO until 2000, leading Marimba to profitability. She was chairman from 2000 to 2004, when Marimba was sold to BMC Software for $239M.

Before co-founding Marimba, Polese spent more than seven years with Sun Microsystems and was the founding product manager for Java when it launched in 1995. She also influenced the transition of its internal name of "Oak" to "Java".

Prior to joining Sun, Polese worked on expert systems at IntelliCorp Inc., helping Fortune 500 companies apply artificial intelligence to solving complex business challenges.

== Recognition ==
In 2014, Polese was inducted into the Women in Technology International (WITI) Hall of Fame.

Polese is the recipient of the 2010 National Center for Women & Information Technology Innovator Award. Early in her career, in 1997, she made Time magazine's list of "The 25 Most Influential Americans".

In 2018, Polese appeared in the documentary Silicon Valley: The Untold Story.
