= Lucy Sanders =

American computer scientist

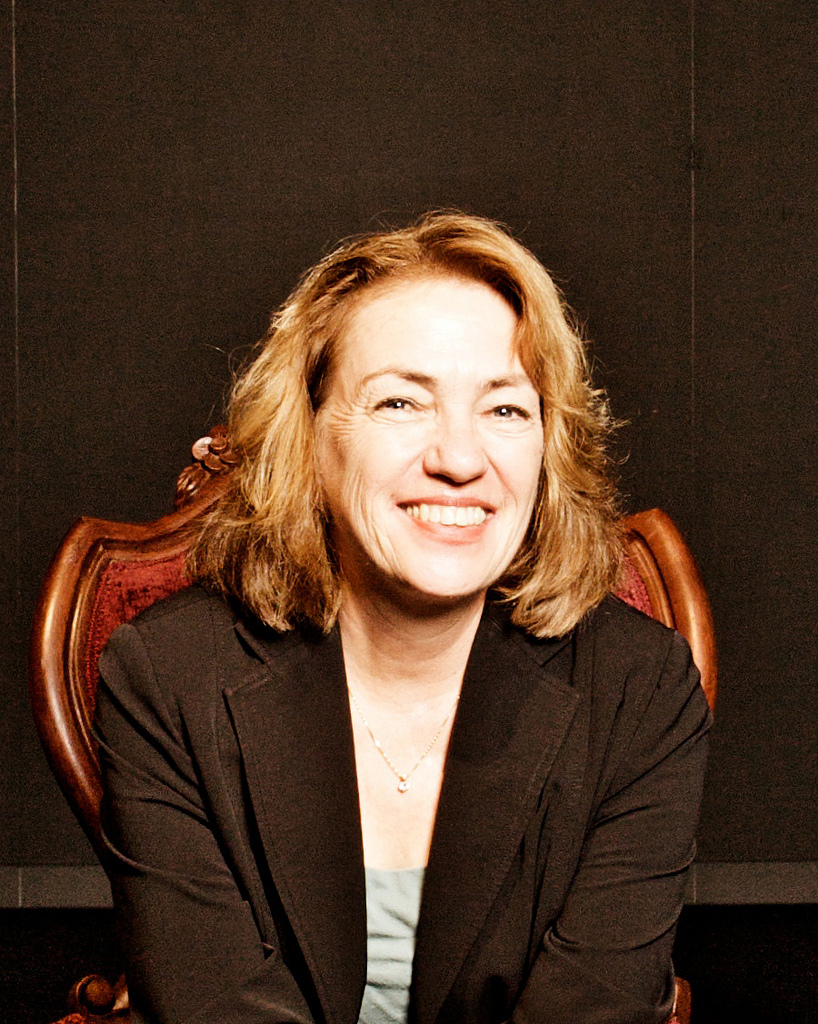
- Born: Lucinda M. Sanders; 1954 (age 71–72); Indianapolis, Indiana
- Education: Louisiana State University (B.Sc. in Computer Science); University of Colorado Boulder (M.S. in Computer Science)
- Occupations: Executive-in-Residence and Co-Founder of NCWIT
- Known for: Early multimedia communications product development, founder of NCWIT and broadening participation in computing, quantum workforce development.
- Awards: Bell Labs Fellow, Habermann Award, Bob Newman Lifetime Achievement Award, Boulder County Hall of Fame, U.S. News STEM Leadership Hall of Fame, Women in Technology International (WITI) Hall of Fame

Lucinda M. Sanders (also known as Lucy Sanders) is Executive in Residence and NCWIT co-founder in the Center for Technology Workforce Innovation at the University of Colorado. She served as NCWIT's operational CEO for 20 years and continues to participate actively in NCWIT directions (including as a Director and member of the organization's executive committee) as well as working with the Elevate Quantum Tech Innovation Hub where, as the Principal Investigator, she leads the Workforce Development Initiatives funded by the U.S. EDA. She is the recipient of many distinguished honors in the STEM fields, including induction into the US News STEM Leadership Hall of Fame in 2013.

== Early age and education ==
At an early age, Sanders displayed an interest in the STEM fields. Sanders had three main influences that led her to pursue an education in computer science: her father, her high school math teacher, and her sister. Her father was an early adopter of computer science when it first began to develop as a large scale field, her high school teacher taught Sanders skills required for computer programming, and her sister became successful after receiving one of the early degrees in computer science. Upon graduating from high school, Sanders attended Louisiana State University and received her bachelor's degree in computer science. Sanders then attended the University of Colorado Boulder where she attained a master's degree in computer science.

== Professional career ==
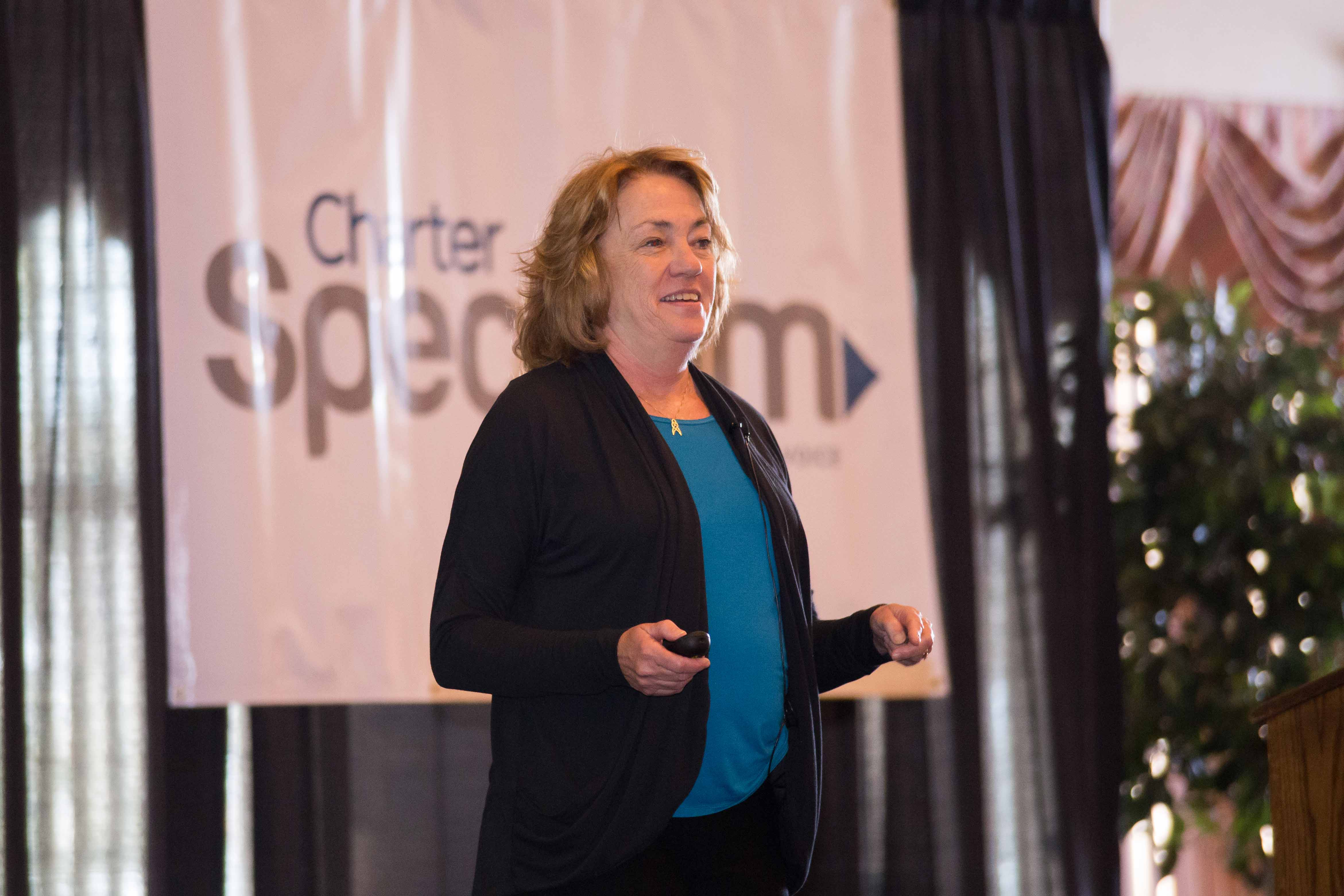
Lucy Sanders speaking at a conference

In her early career, Sanders worked as a Research and Development (R&D) Manager at Bell Labs. She later became an executive vice president and worked as the CTO of Lucent Customer Care Solutions until 1999. She moved on from Bell Labs to work at Inc CRM Solutions at Avaya Labs for two years, until she founded the National Center for Women and Information Technology in 2004, where she currently works as the Executive in Residence She also previously held a position in the board of the Alliance for Technology, Learning, and Society (Atlas), the Denver Public Schools Computer Magnet Advisory Board, the MSRI, the Engineering Advisory Council at the University of Colorado at Boulder, and is a Trustee for is a Trustee at the Colorado School of Mines and the International Computer Science Institute.

== NCWIT ==
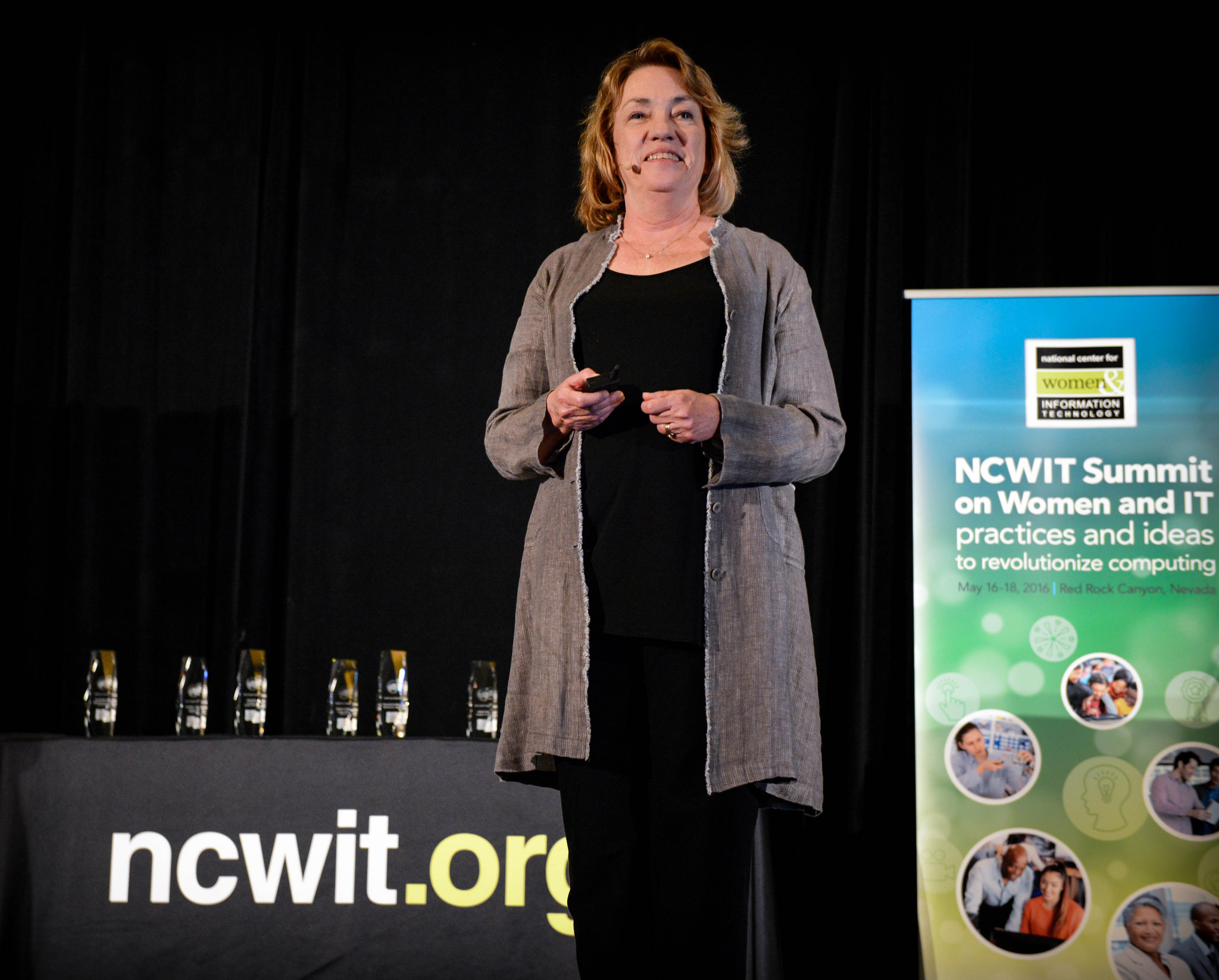
Lucy Sanders speaking at a presentation for the NCWIT

Sanders initially co-founded the National Center for Women & Information Technology in 2004, when she was given a grant from the National Science Foundation. Along with Telle Whitney and Robert Schnabel, Sanders hoped to use NCWIT to increase the number of women in computer fields. Sanders is currently Executive in Residence at NCWIT. She serves on the NCWIT Board of Directors on the Executive and Finance Committees.

== Quantum Computing Workforce Development ==
Sanders is the PI for Quantum Computing workforce development initiatives for the EDA funded (2024) Quantum Tech Innovation Hub in the Rocky Mountain West.

== Publications ==
- Improving Gender Composition in Computing, Jill Ross, Liz Litzler, Joanne Cohoon and Lucy Sanders, Communications of the ACM, April 2012
- Strategy Trumps Money: Recruiting Undergraduate Women into Computing, Lecia J. Barker, J. McGrath Cohoon, and Lucy Sanders, IEEE Computer Magazine, 2010.
- Committee on Assessing the Impacts of Changes in the Information Technology Research and Development Ecosystem: Retaining Leadership in an Increasingly Global Environment, National Research Council of the National Academies, January 2009.
- IT Innovation and the Role of Diversity, Lucinda Sanders, Black IT Professional Magazine, Summer 2006.
- Ahuja, Sid and Sanders, Lucinda M., “Multimedia Collaboration”, AT&T Technical Journal, October 1995.
- Katz, Bryan and Sanders, Lucinda M., “MMCX Server Delivers Multimedia Here and Now”, AT&T Technology, Winter 1995 – 1996.
- Glass, Kathleen K. and Sanders, Lucinda M. (1992). “Managing Organizational Handoffs with Empowered Teams”. AT&T Technical Journal (22) Volume 71 Number 3, pp. 22 – 29.

== Awards and recognition ==
- Women's Business Collaborative Trailblazer in Gender Equity & Diversity, 2024
- Bob Newman Lifetime Achievement Award, Colorado Technology Association, 2016
- US News STEM Leadership Hall of Fame, 2013
- A. Nico Habermann Award, 2012
- George Norlin Distinguished Service Award, 2011
- Boulder County Business Review Outstanding Women, 2010
- Community Partner, Microsoft, 2009
- Girl Scouts Woman of Distinction, 2008
- WITI Hall of Fame, 2007
- Soroptimist International of Los Angeles Women of Vision Award, 2006
- Aspen Institute Executive Seminar Academic Scholarship, 2005
- CU Boulder Distinguished Engineering Alumni Award for "Industry and Commerce", 2004
- Silicon Valley Tribute to Women in Industry Award for business excellence and community outreach, 2000
- Bell Labs Fellow Award, 1996

== Interviews ==
- Sanders, Lucy (August 15, 2016). "Research Bits: Lucy Sanders". Microsoft (Interview). Interviewed by Josephine Cheng. Microsoft Research Faculty Summit: Youtube.
- Sanders, Lucy (October 2, 2015). "How Lucy Sanders Tackles Gender Inequity: Data, Research, Humor". National Center for Women Information & Technology (Interview). Interviewed by Tamara Chuang. Boulder: The Denver Post.
- Sanders, Lucy (January 7, 2014). "Lucy Sanders-Science and Technology Award". Daily Edventures (Interview). Interviewed by OnSight Media. OnSight Media.
- Sanders, Lucy (June 1, 2017). "Inquiry- Lucy Sanders". Alumni Association CU Boulder (Interview). Interviewed by Eric Gershon. Boulder: Coloradan Alumni Magazine.

== See also ==
- Women in Computing
- Information Technology
- Computer Science
- Women in Computer Science
