= John E. Dennis =

American mathematician

- Born: 1939 (age 86–87)
- Education: University of Miami; University of Utah
- Awards: Fulbright Scholar (1986); SIAM Fellow (2010)
- Scientific career
- Fields: Numerical computation Mathematical optimization
- Workplaces: University of Utah; Cornell University; Rice University
- Thesis: Variations on Newton's Method (1966)
- Doctoral advisor: Robert E. Barnhill
- Doctoral students: Vladimir Rokhlin Jr.; Robert B. Schnabel; Virginia Torczon

John Emory Dennis, Jr. (born 1939) is an American mathematician who has made major contributions in mathematical optimization. Dennis is currently a Noah Harding professor emeritus and research professor in the department of computational and applied mathematics at Rice University in Houston, Texas. His research interests include optimization in engineering design. He is the founder and editor-in-chief of the SIAM Journal on Optimization. In 2010, he was elected a Fellow of the Society for Industrial and Applied Mathematics.

== Education ==
Dennis earned a Bachelor of Science in Industrial Engineering (BSIE), in 1962 and a Master of Science in mathematics in 1964 at the University of Miami. He earned a Ph.D. in mathematics at the University of Utah in 1966.

== Academic career ==
- University of Utah, Department of Mathematics, Assistant Professor, 1966–1967
- Cornell University, Department of Computer Science, full professor, 1969–1974
- Rice University, Department of Computational and Applied Mathematics, full professor (retired), 1979–2007

At Rice, Dennis served as department chairman in both the Department of Computational and Applied Mathematics (CAAM) and Department of Computer Science (CS). He was also the chair of the Center for Research in Parallel Computing (CRPC) Optimization Project. He was the thesis director for 32 PhD students at Rice.

== Publications ==
=== Books & monographs ===
- On the matrix polynomial, lambda-matrix and block eigenvalue problems (1971). Pittsburgh, PA: Carnegie-Mellon University. (co-authors J. F. Traub and Robert Philip Weber)
- Algorithms for solvents of matrix polynomials (1975). Pittsburgh, PA: Carnegie-Mellon University. (co-authors J. F. Traub and R. P. Weber)
- An Adaptive Nonlinear Least-Squares Algorithm (1977), Cambridge, MA: National Bureau of Economic Research. (co-authors Roy E. Welsch and David M. Gay)
- Numerical methods for unconstrained optimization and nonlinear equations (1983). Englewood Cliffs, NJ: Prentice-Hall, Inc. (co-author Robert B. Schnabel)
