= Gary Lindstrom =

American computer scientist (1944–2022)

Gary Edward Lindstrom
- Born: January 8, 1944; Syracuse, New York
- Died: January 10, 2022; Salt Lake City, Utah
- Education: Carnegie Mellon University
- Scientific career
- Fields: Computer science
- Workplaces: University of Utah; University of Pittsburgh
- Thesis: Variability in Language Processors (1971)
- Doctoral advisor: Alan Perlis
- Doctoral students: Mary Lou Soffa
- Website: www.cs.utah.edu/~gary/

Gary Edward Lindstrom (January 8, 1944 – January 10, 2022) was an emeritus professor of computer science at the University of Utah, having previously taught at the University of Pittsburgh. He retired in July 2007 and died on January 10, 2022.

Lindstrom made numerous contributions to areas of data management, verification, and programming language design, specification and implementation. He served as an IEEE Computer Society Distinguished Visitor. According to his website, Dr. Lindstrom served as the founding editor-in-chief the International Journal of Parallel Programming (ISSN 0885-7458) from 1986 to 1993. He co-edited, with Doug DeGroot, the book Logic Programming: Functions, Relations and Equations, which was first published by Prentice-Hall in 1986.

Lindstrom was a graduate of Carnegie Mellon University, where he earned B.S. and M.S. degrees in mathematics, and a Ph.D. in computer science under Alan Perlis.
