= Ani Nenkova =

Computational linguist

- Alma mater: Columbia University (PhD in Computer Science); Sofia University (MS)

Scientific career
- Fields: Computer Science; Computational Linguistics; Artificial Intelligence
- Institutions: Adobe Research; University of Pennsylvania; Columbia University; Sofia University
- Thesis: Understanding the process of multi-document summarization: content selection, rewrite and evaluation (PhD thesis, 2006); Tableau Methods for Concept Languages (MS thesis, in Bulgarian, 2000)
- Doctoral Advisor: Kathleen McKeown (Columbia University)
- Postdoc Advisor: Dan Jurafsky (Stanford NLP)
- Website: Personal website

Ani Nenkova is principal scientist at Adobe Research, currently on leave from her position as an associate professor of computer and information science at the University of Pennsylvania. Her research focuses on computational linguistics and artificial intelligence, with an emphasis on developing computational methods for analysis of text quality and style, discourse, affect recognition, and summarization.

== Education ==
Nenkova earned her master's degree from the Department of Mathematical Logic and Applications (Faculty of Mathematics and Informatics) at Sofia University in Bulgaria. She then carried out doctoral work at Columbia University, where she was advised by Kathleen McKeown, earning a Ph.D. in computer science in 2006.

== Career ==
Besides Nenkova’s position as an associate professor at the University of Pennsylvania, she also serves as a co-editor-in-chief of the Transactions of the Association for Computational Linguistics (TACL) and an area chair/senior program committee member for ACL, NAACL and AAAI. In the past, she has served as a member of the editorial board of Computational Linguistics (2009--2011), an associate editor for the IEEE/ACM Transactions on Audio, Speech and Language Processing (2015--2018), and a program co-chair for SIGDial 2014 and NAACL-HLT in 2016. In February of 2021, Nenkova started a new position at Adobe Research, joining the team as the head of the lab while on leave from Penn.

== Research ==
Nenkova’s research interests include natural language processing, summarization, emotion recognition, and discourse. In the area of emotion recognition, Nenkova and her collaborators developed an approach that relies on regions of interest related to properties of phoneme or word classes, which served as a significant improvement over other approaches for representing speech in emotion recognition. In Nenkova’s research on hidden meanings, or what makes “great” writing, and literature search automation, she trains programs on word representation datasets that are curated by humans. These tell the computer what words and phrases mean in a specific context. The long-term goal of this research is to develop new algorithms that can analyze and understand new text without a human translator. Nenkova and her collaborators have also developed many tools and projects, including Speciteller, a tool for predicting sentence specificity, CATS, the corpus of science journalism articles used for their TACL 13 paper, and SIMetrix (Summary Input Similarity Metrics), a tool to perform the automatic summary evaluation in their EMNLP'09 and CL'14 papers.

== Publications ==
Nenkova has over 150 publications.

=== Selected publications ===
- Automatic Summarization Now Publishers 2011 ISBN 1601984707
- Word Embeddings (Also) Encode Human Personality Stereotypes, Agarwal et al, *SEM@NAACL-HLT 2019.
- How to Compare Summarizers Without Target Length? Pitfalls, Solutions and Re-Examination of the Neural Summarization Literature, Simeng Sun, Ori Shapira, Ido Dagan, Ani Nenkova, To appear at the Workshop on Methods for Optimizing and Evaluating Neural Language Generation at NAACL 2019.
- Predicting Annotation Difficulty to Improve Task Routing and Model Performance for Biomedical Information Extraction, Yang et al, NAACL-HLT 2019.
- A Corpus with Multi-Level Annotations of Patients, Interventions and Outcomes to Support Language Processing for Medical Literature, Nye et al, ACL 2018.
- Combining Lexical and Syntactic Features for Detecting Content-Dense Texts in News, Yang and Nenkova, JAIR. 60: 179-219 (2017).
- Fast and Accurate Prediction of Sentence Specificity, Li and Nenkova, AAAI 2015.
- Prosodic cues for emotion: analysis with discrete characterization of intonation, Cao et al, Speech prosody, 2014.
