= Computing Research Association =

Non-profit association

- Abbreviation: CRA
- Founded: 1972
- Type: 501(c)(3) not-for-profit membership corporation
- Headquarters: Washington, DC
- Coordinates: 38.903466°N 77.042898°W
- Region served: North America
- Fields: Computer Science, Computer Engineering, Informatics
- Key people: Tracy Camp (Executive Director), Ellen W. Zegura (Chair, Board of Directors)
- Staff: 20
- Website: cra.org

The Computing Research Association (CRA) is a 501(c)3 non-profit association of North American academic departments of computer science, computer engineering, and related fields; laboratories and centers in industry, government, and academia engaging in basic computing research; and affiliated professional societies. CRA was formed in 1972 and is based in Washington, D.C., United States.

== Mission and activities ==
CRA's mission is to enhance innovation by joining with industry, government and academia to strengthen research and advanced education in computing. CRA executes this mission by leading the computing research community, informing policymakers and the public, and facilitating the development of strong, diverse talent in the field.

=== Policy ===
CRA assists policymakers who seek to understand the issues confronting the federal Networking and Information Technology Research and Development (NITRD) program, a thirteen-agency, $4-billion-a-year federal effort to support computing research. CRA works to educate Members of Congress and provide policy makers with expert testimony in areas associated with computer science research. CRA also maintains a Government Affairs website and a Computing Research Policy Blog.

=== Professional development ===
CRA works to support computing researchers throughout their careers to help ensure that the need for a continuous supply of talented and well-educated computing researchers and advanced practitioners is met. CRA assists with leadership development within the computing research community, promotes needed changes in advanced education, and encourages participation by members of underrepresented groups. CRA offers Academic Careers Workshops, supports the CRA-W: CRA's Committee on the Status of Women in Computing Research, and runs the DREU: Distributed Research Experiences for Undergraduates Project.

=== Leadership ===
CRA supports leadership development in the research community to support researchers in broadening the scope of computing research and increasing its impact on society and works to promote cooperation among various elements of the computing research community. CRA supports the CRA Conference at Snowbird, a biennial conference where leadership in computing research departments gather to network and address common issues in the field. CRA also supports the Computing Leadership Summit.

=== Information collection and dissemination ===
CRA collects and disseminates information to the research and policy-making communities information about the importance and state of computing research and related policy. CRA works to develop relevant information and make the information available to the public, policy makers, and computing research community.

CRA publishes the Taulbee Survey, a key source of information on the enrollment, production, and employment of Ph.D.s in computer science and computer engineering (CS & CE) and in providing salary and demographic data for faculty in CS & CE in North America. Statistics given include gender and ethnicity breakdowns. CRA also provides Computing Research News published ten times annually for computing researchers, and the CRA Bulletin to share news, information about CRA initiatives, and items of interest to the general community.

== Computing Community Consortium ==
The Computing Community Consortium (CCC) is a programmatic committee of the Computing Research Association. Its stated mission is "...to catalyze the computing research community and enable the pursuit of innovative, high-impact research".

The CCC conducts activities that strengthen the research community, articulate compelling research visions, and align those visions with pressing national and global challenges. The CCC communicates the importance of those visions to policymakers, government and industry stakeholders, the public, and the research community itself.

=== History ===
In March 2006, the National Science Foundation (NSF) issued a solicitation indicating its desire to establish a Computing Community Consortium. In October of that year, CRA responded to the solicitation, submitting a proposal that was backed by explicit letters of support from 132 Ph.D.-granting academic programs, 16 leading corporations, 7 major national laboratories and research centers, and five professional societies in the field. Pursuant to positive external peer review, the CCC was established in late 2006 through a cooperative agreement between NSF and CRA.

An interim CCC Council was appointed by the proposal team in December 2006. Following an open recruitment process, Ed Lazowska (University of Washington) was selected as Chair of the CCC Council in March 2007. The membership of the inaugural CCC Council was selected through a transparent process and announced in June 2007. The first public activity of the CCC was a set of five plenary talks at the Federated Computing Research Conference (FCRC 2007) that month.

Today, the CCC Council has 20 members on 3-year staggered terms, representing the diverse nature of the computing research field.

== CRA Honorary Awards ==
The Computing Research Association offers a number of honorary recognitions for individuals, covering notable contributions to increasing the involvement of underrepresented communities in computing research, making outstanding service contributions to the computing community, making significant early-career research contributions and efforts to broaden participation in computing, and recognizing early-career research achievements and leadership in diversifying computing, among others.

=== A. Nico Habermann Award ===
The A. Nico Habermann Award is offered by the Computing Research Association to individuals in recognition of contributions aimed at increasing the involvement of underrepresented communities in computing research. It is named in honour of the Dutch computer scientist A. Nico Habermann.

Award recipients include:

- 2026: Wendy Powley
- 2025: Lori Pollock
- 2024: Mary Ann Leung
- 2023: Charles Lee Isbell Jr.
- 2022: Andrea Danyluk
- 2021: Mary Jane Irwin
- 2020: Carla Ellis
- 2019: Maria Gini
- 2018: Juan Gilbert, Manuel Pérez Quiñones
- 2017: Carol Frieze
- 2016: Ayanna Howard
- 2015: Ann Quiroz Gates
- 2014: Nancy Amato
- 2013: David Notkin
- 2012: Lucy Sanders, Robert Schnabel, Telle Whitney
- 2011: Charles Lickel
- 2010: Anne Condon
- 2008: Richard E. Ladner
- 2007: Janice E. Cuny
- 2006: Mary Lou Soffa
- 2005: Jane Margolis
- 2004: Maria Klawe, Nancy Leveson
- 2003: Rita Rodriguez
- 2002: Valerie Taylor
- 2001: Anita Borg
- 2000: Roscoe Giles
- 1999: Sheila Humphreys
- 1998: Bryant York
- 1997: Andrew Bernat
- 1996: Caroline Wardle
- 1995: Eugene Lawler
- 1994: Richard A. Tapia

=== CRA Distinguished Service Award ===
The CRA Distinguished Service Award is offered by the Computing Research Association to a person, persons, or organization that has made an outstanding service contribution to the computing research community. This award recognizes service in areas such as government affairs, professional societies, publications, conferences, and leadership that has a major impact on computing research.

Award recipients include:

- 2026: Dan Reed
- 2025: Carl Landwehr
- 2024: Manish Parashar
- 2023: Lynne Parker
- 2022: Katherine Yelick
- 2021: James Kurose
- 2020: The CARES Movement
- 2019: Edward Felten
- 2018: Paul Messina
- 2017: Tom Kalil
- 2016: Maria Klawe
- 2015: Farnam Jahanian
- 2014: Vinton G. Cerf
- 2013: Peter G. Neumann
- 2012: Susan L. Graham
- 2011: Jeannette M. Wing
- 2010: Moshe Y. Vardi
- 2009: Eugene H. Spafford
- 2008: Rick Adrion
- 2007: Peter A. Freeman, John E. Hopcroft
- 2006: Mary Jane Irwin, David Patterson
- 2005: Edward Lazowska
- 2004: David Clark, Barbara Simons
- 2003: Ruzena Bajcsy
- 2002: Andries van Dam
- 2001: Marjory Blumenthal
- 2000: Juris Hartmanis
- 1999: Bill Joy, Ken Kennedy
- 1998: Merrell Patrick
- 1997: Anita Jones
- 1996: Paul Young
- 1995: Randy Katz
- 1994: William A. Wulf
- 1992: Joseph F. Traub
- 1991: David Gries
- 1990: Robert Kahn
- 1989: Peter J. Denning
- 1988: Kent Curtis

=== Anita Borg Early Career Award ===
The CRA Anita Borg Early Career Award, offered annually by the Computing Research Association's Committee on Widening Participation in Computing Research (CRA-WP), honors early-career researchers in North America for significant research contributions and efforts to increase participation of underrepresented groups in computing.

Award recipients include:

- 2026: Akshitha Sriraman
- 2025: Adriana Schulz
- 2024: Yakun Sophia Shao
- 2023: Robin Brewer
- 2022: Maya Cakmak
- 2021: Finale Doshi-Velez
- 2020: Olga Russakovsky
- 2019: Nadia Heninger
- 2018: Yejin Choi, Reetuparna Das
- 2017: Lydia Tapia
- 2016: Martha Kim, Hanna Wallach
- 2015: Natalie Enright Jerger
- 2014: Jaime Teevan
- 2013: Yanlei Diao
- 2012: M. Bernardine Dias, Katie A. Siek
- 2011: Alexandra Fedorova
- 2010: A.J. Bernheim Brush, Radhika Nagpal
- 2009: Kim Hazelwood
- 2008: Chandra Krintz
- 2007: Li-Shiuan Peh
- 2006: Gail Murphy
- 2005: Yuanyuan Zhou
- 2004: Joanna McGrenere

=== Skip Ellis Early Career Award ===
The CRA Skip Ellis Early Career Award, named for Clarence "Skip" Ellis and awarded annually by CRA-WP, recognizes early-career researchers for significant research achievements and leadership in diversifying computing.

Award recipients include:

- 2026: Elaine Short
- 2025: Cynthia Bennett
- 2024: Martez Mott
- 2023: Michael Carbin
- 2022: Christina Harrington
- 2021: Sanmi Koyejo
- 2020: Tawanna Dillahunt, Michel A. Kinsy

== See also ==
- Association for Computing Machinery
- CRA was the main organizer of the first Federated Computing Research Conference in 1993.
- CRA-WP
- Informatics Europe is a similar organization to the CRA for Europe.
