= Cécile Paris =

French and Australian computer scientist

Cécile Laurence Paris is a computer scientist whose research has concerned natural language processing, user modeling, and collaborative intelligence. Originally French, she was educated in the United States and works in Australia as a chief research scientist for CSIRO, where she directed the Collaborative Intelligence (CINTEL) Research Program.

== Education and career ==
Paris's parents were French; she grew up in the former French West Africa, in Vietnam, and in France. She was drawn to computer science in high school through an interest in mathematics and in programmable calculators.

Paris did her undergraduate studies at the University of California, Berkeley with the support of an International Student Scholarship, and graduated with a bachelor's degree, with honours, in 1980. She continued her studies at Columbia University in New York City, where she received a master's degree in 1982 and completed her Ph.D. in 1987. Her doctoral dissertation, The Use of Explicit User Models in Text Generation: Tailoring Object Descriptions to a User's Level of Expertise, was jointly supervised by Kathleen McKeown and Michael Lebowitz.

From 1987 to 1994 she worked at the USC Information Sciences Institute of the University of Southern California, as a research scientist, project leader, and assistant research professor. From 1993 until 1996 she also worked at the University of Brighton in England as a research fellow in the Information Technology Research Institute. She moved to Australia and CSIRO in 1996. There, she became a senior principal research scientist and group leader in 2014, and a chief scientist in 2017. She has also held an affiliated faculty position at Monash University since 2018, and is an honorary professor at Macquarie University.

== Recognition ==
Paris was elected as a Fellow of the Australian Academy of Technology and Engineering (FTSE) in 2016. She is a Fellow of the Royal Society of New South Wales (FRSN), elected in 2019.

She was the 2024 recipient of the CSIRO Lifetime Achievement Award, given "for outstanding scientific contributions, impactful research and sustained performance achieving international recognition".
