= Maria L. Gini =

Italian and American computer scientist

Maria Gini
- Born: Milan, Italy
- Education: University of Milano
- Known for: Artificial intelligence, robotics, intelligent systems
- Awards: ACM Fellow, AAAI Fellow, CRA A. Nico Habermann Award, NCWIT Harrold and Notkin Research and Graduate, Morse-Alumni Award, Mentoring Award, INFORMS ISS Design Science Award
- Scientific career
- Fields: Computer science
- Workplaces: University of Minnesota
- Doctoral advisor: Giovanni degli Antoni
- Website: www-users.cs.umn.edu/~gini/

Maria Gini is an Italian and American Computer Scientist in artificial intelligence and robotics. She has considerable service to the computer science artificial intelligence community and for broadening participation in computing. She was chair of the ACM Special Interest Group in Artificial Intelligence SIGAI (renamed from SIGART) from 2003 to 2010. She is currently a member of the CRA-W board.

== Biography ==
=== Academic ===
She received a degree in physics (a laurea) from the University of Milan in 1972. From 1974 to 1979 she was a Research Associate and from 1980 to 1982 a Senior Research Associate in the Department of Electronics in Politecnico of Milano in Italy. She then joined the Department of Computer Science at the University of Minnesota in 1982 as an assistant professor. She became the first female to join the department. With her imagination and dedication to her field, she has received many outstanding achievements and honors in teaching, including the Morse-Alumni Award in 1987. While there she was promoted to associate professor in 1988 and to professor in 1997. In 2001 Gini received the Distinguished Women Scholars Award from the University of Minnesota. Since 2005 she has also been Associate Chair of the Department of Computer Science and Engineering. She was named an AAAI fellow in 2008 "for significant contributions to coordination and competition in multirobot and multiagent systems, for leadership in the AI community, and for inspiring the next generation". In 2011, she received the Mullen-Spector-Truax Women's Leadership Award from the University of Minnesota, presented annually to "a faculty or staff woman at the University who has made outstanding contributions to women's leadership development". Gini was also named an IEEE fellow in 2018. As of 2019, she has graduated 34 Ph.D. students as well as nearly 100 graduate students.

=== Advocacy Efforts ===
Gini organized first the biennial MinneWIC (ACM-W Celebration of Women in Computing in the Upper MidWest) event in 2010, and went on to organize the event in 2012, 2015 and 2017 as well. The first event had 140 attendees.

She initiated and runs the Summer Computing Academy at the University of Minnesota for female junior high and high school students interested in computing. Every summer since 2015, Gini has invited up to 25 students on campus for this two week day camp where they are introduced to Python and get the opportunity to hear from various faculty and tour research facilities on campus.

=== Marriage ===
Gini met her current husband Daniel Boley through her fellowship at Stanford.

== Career ==
Gini created POINTY, a system that introduced the use of an interpreted language into robot programming and was one of the very early user interfaces designed for robot program development. The major innovation in POINTY was to develop an interpreter for the programming language AL, which was the language used to program the Stanford manipulators. POINTY allowed programmers to develop and test programs interactively, as opposed to have to compile and debug them using assembly language on the real time robot controller. It also allowed users to specify positions of objects in the robot space by pointing to them, from which the name POINTY.

In other work, Maria and her co-author outline the effects of missing information on classical AI planning and how to deal with sensors when planning. It shows how interrupting the planning process to start execution and collect sensor information affects the resulting plan and might make the problem unsolvable. It proposes instead to defer planning, and proposes domain independent and domain dependent strategies to enable the planner to decide what to do when information is missing.

Gini was one of the first to introduce the idea of creating a virtual market for agents to negotiate with each other. This paper proposes an architecture with a banking system, a communication infrastructure, advertising, and methods for brokered transactions among agents. It describes an implemented prototype for the market, which was later extended to support bids for tasks that have time and precedence constraints.

Gini and her co-authors created the most complex autonomous task ever done by a group of very small robots, the University of Minnesota Scout. The methods presented are distinctive in that they rely on extremely limited computing power and sensing in the robots, no communications, and no central controller. The methods are demonstrated with autonomous surveillance of an area by a group of Scouts that disperse to observe motions in the area with their cameras.

Gini and her co-authors proposed to use data collected by robots to create maps of indoor environments that are made of segments rather than probabilistic certainty grids. This reduces drastically the size of the maps and makes them readily usable by humans. The work is motivated by the desire to build maps without having to use odometry, and to build maps with multiple robots without requiring the robots to see each other. Each robot builds a map incrementally by matching geometric features (segments and angles between them) in the environment with features previously obtained, The partial maps produced by each robot are then merged again using feature matching.

Gini and her authors proposed a method for auctions of tasks to a group of robots. The most distinctive feature is the robustness of the method to robot failures, which is obtained by doing new rounds of auctions every time a task has been completed or a robot has exceeded the time allocated to the task. The paper provides bounds on the cost of the solution achieved, and includes experimental results obtained with real robots and in simulation in a variety of environments.

Gini also has work on economic regimes models to characterize market conditions in the form of recurrent statistical patterns. The models can be used to predict prices, price trends, and the probability of receiving a customer order at a given price. The models are developed using statistical analysis of historical data, and are used in real-time to characterize observed market conditions and predict the evolution of market conditions over multiple time scales. The work described in this paper received the INFORMS ISS award.

== Awards ==
Her notable awards include:

- ACM Fellow (2019) "for contributions to robotics and multi-agent systems and a lifelong commitment to diversity in computing".
- CRA A. Nico Habermann Award (2019)
- NCWIT Harrold and Notkin Research and Graduate Mentoring Award (2018)
- IEEE Fellow(2018)
- Received the Distinguished Service Award from the Association for the Advancement of Artificial Intelligence (AAAI) "for her outstanding contributions to the field of artificial intelligence through sustained service leading AI societies, journals, and conferences; mentoring colleagues; and working to increase participation of women in AI and computing," (2016)
- Listed in 25 women in robotics you need to know about (2014)
- INFORMS ISS Design Science Award (2012)
- AAAI Fellow in 2008
- ACM Distinguished Scientist in 2006
- Morse-Alumni Award (1987)

== Projects ==
HER CURRENT PROJECTS:

- Distributed Robotics
- MinERS: Minnesota Emergency Response Squad

HER PAST PROJECTS:

- Robot Motion Planning
- MedLang: Medical Language Study Group
