= Jean-Loup Baer =

French-American computer scientist

- Awards: ACM Fellow
- Scientific career
- Fields: Computer science
- Institutions: University of Washington
- Doctoral advisor: Gerald Estrin
- Doctoral students: Carla Ellis
- Website: homes.cs.washington.edu/~baer/

Jean-Loup Baer is a computer scientist and Professor Emeritus at the University of Washington.

== Biography ==
Jean-Loup Baer received a Diplome d'Ingénieur in Electrical Engineering and the Doctorat 3e cycle in Computer Science from the University of Grenoble (France) and a Ph.D. from University of California, Los Angeles in 1968 under the supervision of Gerald Estrin.

== Awards and honors ==
Baer was elected as an IEEE Fellow in 1992 "for contributions to the design and analysis of parallel computer systems". In 1997, the Association for Computing Machinery named him an ACM Fellow "for contributions to the design and evaluation of parallel processing systems, in particular in the areas of cache coherence protocols and techniques to tolerate memory latency". He was awarded a Guggenheim Fellowship in 1979.

== Books ==
- Computer Systems Architecture (Computer Science Press, 1980)
- Microprocessor Architecture: From Simple Pipelines to Chip Multiprocessors (Cambridge University Press, 2010)
