= Jane Margolis =

Social scientist

Jane Margolis is a social scientist and faculty member at the University of California, Los Angeles Graduate School of Education and Information Studies who studies why so few African American, Latino, and female students are learning computer science.

== Education ==
Jane earned a A.L.M in Psychology from Harvard Extension School in 1985 and an Ed.D. from Harvard University in 1990.

== Recognitions ==
She was recognized by President Barack Obama on February 1, 2016, as one of nine Computer Science Champions of Change for her work to democratize access to computer science education.

== Books ==
- Unlocking the Clubhouse: Women in Computing (with Allan Fisher, MIT Press, 2001)
- Stuck in the Shallow End: Education, Race, and Computing (with Rachel Estrella, Joanna Goode, Jennifer Jellison Holme and Kim Nao, MIT Press, 2008)
