= Ayanna Howard =

American roboticist (born 1972)

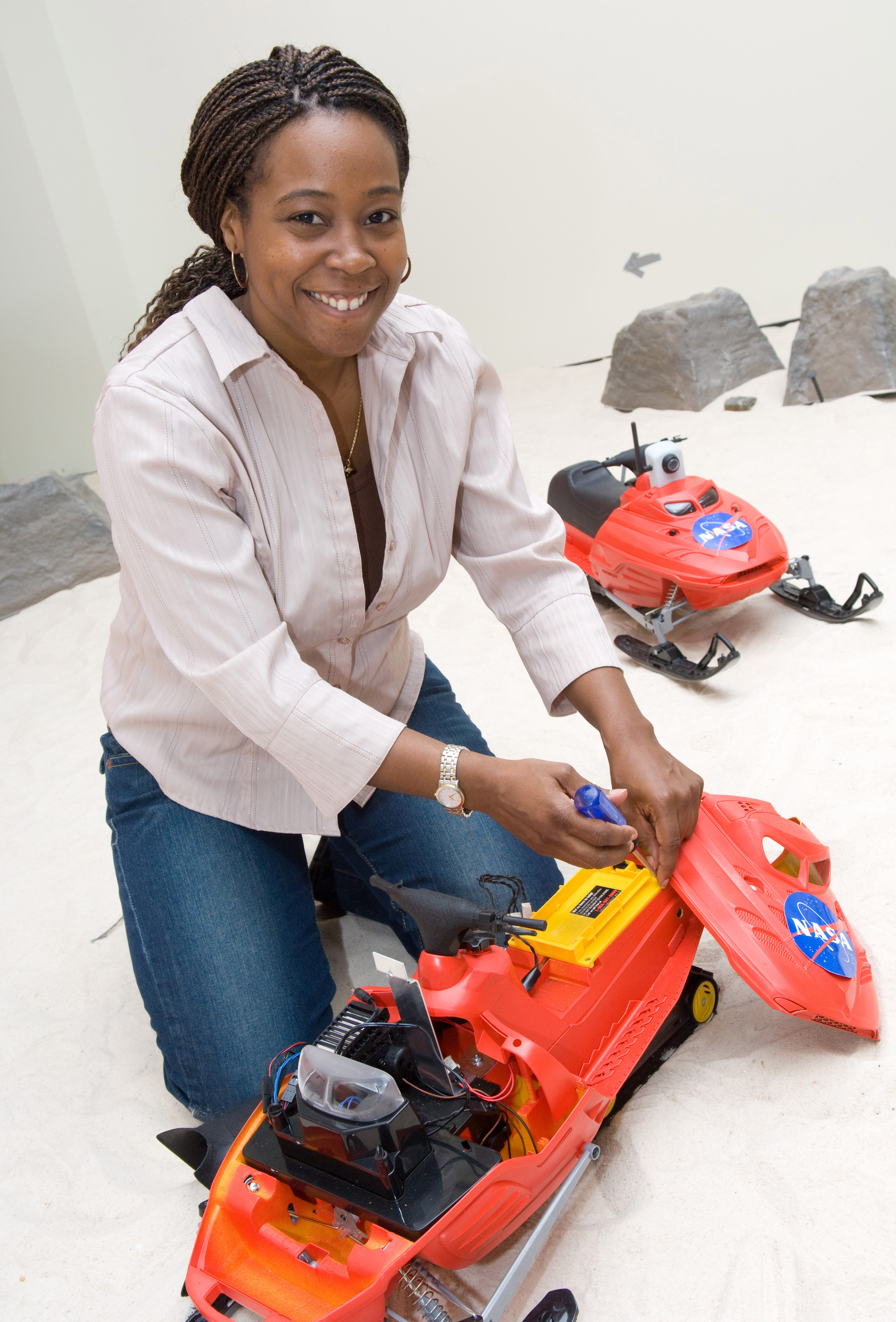
- Born: January 24, 1972 (age 54)
- Education: University of Southern California; Brown University; Claremont Graduate University
- Scientific career
- Fields: Robotics; Artificial intelligence
- Workplaces: Georgia Institute of Technology; Jet Propulsion Laboratory
- Doctoral advisor: George A. Bekey

Ayanna MacCalla Howard (born January 24, 1972) is an American roboticist, entrepreneur, and educator who began serving as the President of Spelman College on August 1, 2026, succeeding Interim President and Chair Emerita Rosalind "Roz" Brewer. She previously served as the dean of the College of Engineering at Ohio State University from March 2021 to July 2026. Howard became the first woman to lead the Ohio State College of Engineering.

Howard previously served as the chair of the School of Interactive Computing in the Georgia Tech College of Computing, the Linda J. and Mark C. Smith Endowed Chair in Bioengineering in the School of Electrical and Computer Engineering, and the director of the Human-Automation Systems (Humans) Lab.

== Early life and education ==
Howard was born in Providence, Rhode Island in 1972. Her parents, Eric MacCalla Jr. and Johnetta MacCalla, were completing their undergraduate degrees at Brown University in Providence. After her parents graduated, the family moved to Southern California, where Howard was raised. As a little girl, she was interested in aliens and robots. Her favorite TV show was The Bionic Woman.

Howard received her B.S. in engineering from Brown University in 1993 and her M.S. and Ph.D. in electrical engineering from the University of Southern California in 1994 and 1999, respectively. Her thesis, Recursive Learning for Deformable Object Manipulation, was advised by George A. Bekey. In addition, Howard's Doctoral thesis was triggered by the AIDS epidemic with focus on sorting hospital waste by using robots. Howard has also received an MBA from Claremont Graduate University.

== Career ==
Howard's early interest in artificial intelligence led her to pursue a senior position at Seattle-based Axcelis Inc, where she helped develop Evolver, the first commercial genetic algorithm, and Brainsheet, a neural network developed in partnership with Microsoft. From 1993 to 2005, she worked at the NASA Jet Propulsion Laboratory, holding multiple roles such as senior robotics researcher and deputy manager in the Office of the Chief Scientist.

In 2005, she joined Georgia Tech as an associate professor and founder of the Human-Automation Systems (Humans) lab. She has also served as the associate director of research for Georgia Tech's Institute for Robotics and Intelligent Machines and as chair of the multidisciplinary robotics Ph.D. program at Georgia Tech. In 2017, she became the chair of the School of Interactive Computing at Georgia Tech.

In 2008, Howard received worldwide attention for her SnoMote robots, designed to study the impact of global warming on the Antarctic ice shelves. In 2013, she founded Zyrobotics, which has released their first suite of therapy and educational products for children with special needs.

Howard has authored 250 publications in peer-reviewed journals and conference proceedings, and has co-edited or co-authored more than a dozen books and book chapters. She has also been rewarded four patents and given over 140 invited talks and keynotes. She is a Fellow of the Association for the Advancement of Artificial Intelligence (AAAI) and the Institute of Electrical and Electronics Engineers (IEEE). Among her many honors, Howard has been awarded the Computer Research Association's A. Nico Habermann Award and the Richard A. Tapia Achievement Award.

In a 2020 interview on Marketplace, Howard outlined how companion robots could alleviate the effects of social distancing caused by the COVID-19 pandemic in the United States.

On November 30, 2020, the Columbus Dispatch reported that Howard would become the next dean of the College of Engineering at Ohio State University on March 1, pending approval by the board of trustees. On March 1, 2021, she assumed this role, becoming the first woman to hold the position.

In 2021, Howard received the Athena Lecturer Award from Association for Computing Machinery (ACM) for her Contributions to Robotics, AI and Broadening Participation in Computing. In June 2022, Howard was elected a trustee of Brown University.

In 2026, Howard was named the 12th president of Spelman College after a national search, becoming the first scientist and engineer to lead the institution. She was selected while serving as dean of the College of Engineering at The Ohio State University, where she oversaw significant growth in research and academic programs and advanced the college's leadership in robotics and artificial intelligence. Her work as president also includes promoting inclusion in tech among students, specifically in the Black college and university (HBCU) ecosystem.

== Research ==
Howard's research interests include human-robot interaction, assistive/rehabilitation robotics, science-driven/field robotics, and perception, learning, and reasoning.

Howard's research and published works span across various topics in robotics and AI, including intelligent learning, virtual reality for rehabilitation and robotics in the role of pediatric therapy. Her research is highlighted by her focus on technology development for intelligent agents that must interact with and in a human-centered world. Her work, which addresses issues of human-robot interaction, learning, and autonomous control, has resulted in more than 200 peer-reviewed publications.

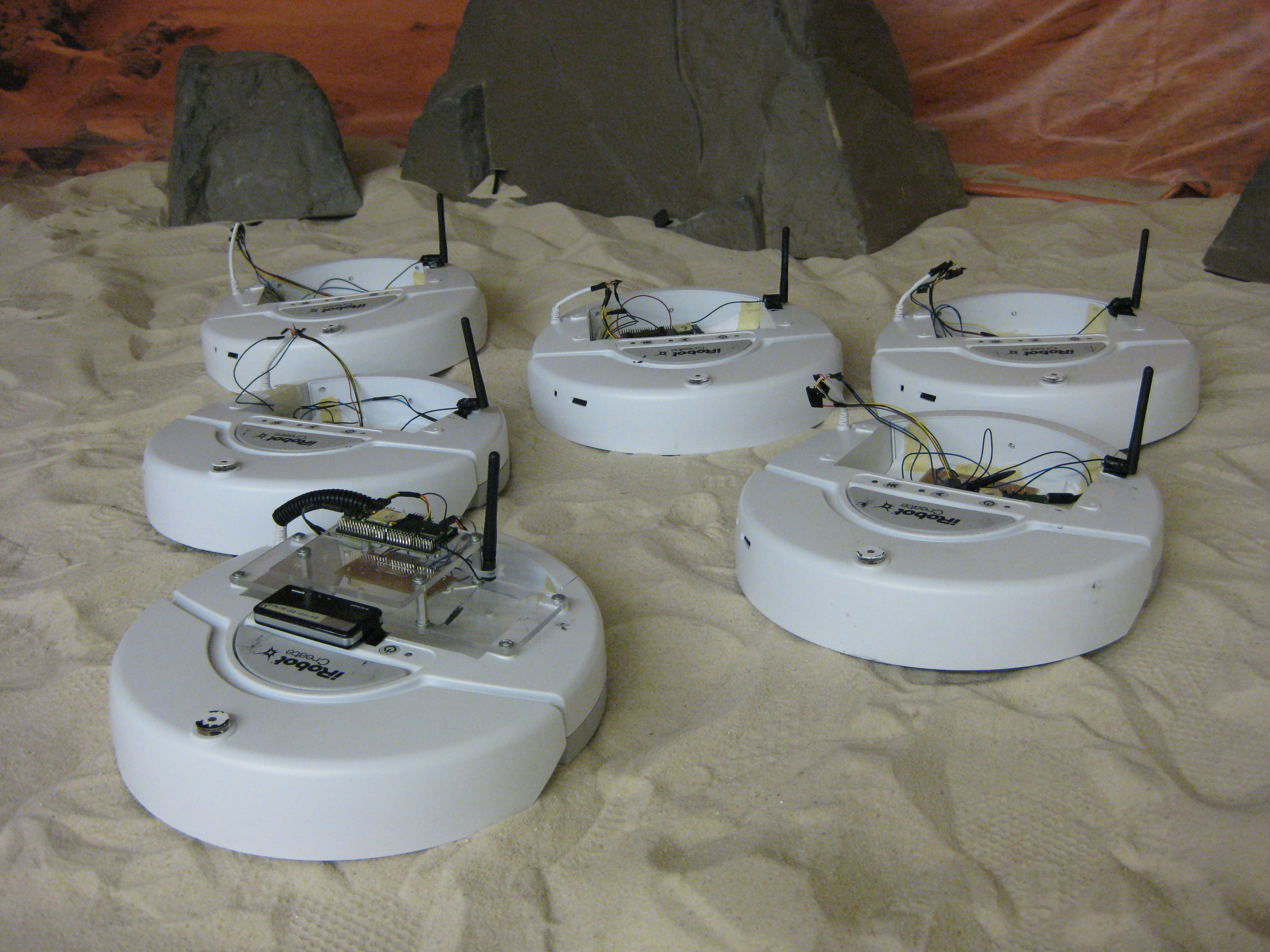
A team of iRobot Create robots at the GRITS Lab (joint with Magnus B. Egerstedt) for a sensor network research project

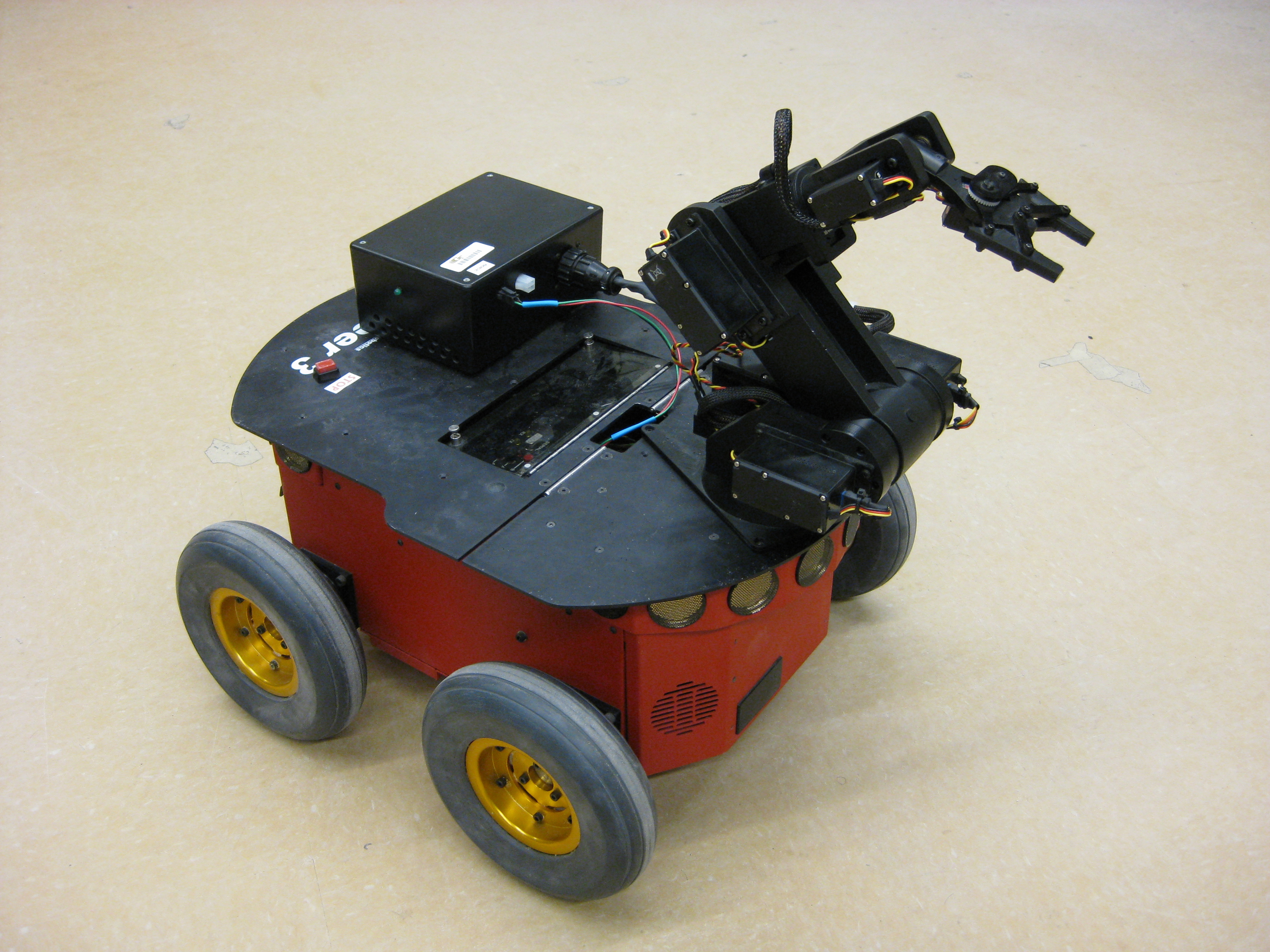

== Honors and awards ==
Howard's numerous accomplishments have been documented in more than a dozen featured articles. In 2003, she was named to the MIT Technology Review TR100 as one of the top 100 innovators in the world under the age of 35. She was featured in Time magazine's "Rise of the Machines" article in 2004. She was also featured in a USA Today Science & Space article.

Some of Howard's notable awards include:

- Lew Allen Award for Excellence (formerly the Director's Research Achievement Award of the Jet Propulsion Laboratory) for significant technical contributions, 2001
- MIT Technology Review Top 100 Young Innovators of the Year, 2003
- NAE Gilbreth Lectureship, 2010
- A. Richard Newton Educator ABIE Award, Anita Borg Institute, 2014
- Computer Research Association's A. Nico Habermann Award, 2016
- Brown Engineering Alumni Medal (BEAM), 2016
- AAAS-Lemelson Invention Ambassador, 2016-2017
- Atlanta magazine's Women Making a Mark, 2017
- Walker's Legacy #WLPower25 Atlanta Award, 2017
- Forbes America's Top 50 Women In Tech, 2018
- ACM Athena Lecturer Award, 2021
- 2021 class of Fellows of the American Association for the Advancement of Science.
- IEEE Fellow, 2021, "for contributions to human-robot interaction systems"
- 2023 AAAI/EAAI Patrick Henry Winston Outstanding Educator Award
