= George A. Bekey =

American roboticist (1928–2024)

- Born: 19 June 1928; Bratislava, Czechoslovakia
- Died: 17 October 2024 (aged 96); Los Angeles, California, U.S.
- Education: University of California, Berkeley; University of California, Los Angeles
- Scientific career
- Fields: Robotics
- Workplaces: University of Southern California

George A. Bekey (19 June 1928 – 17 October 2024) was an American roboticist and the professor of Computer Science, Electrical Engineering and Biomedical Engineering at the University of Southern California.

== Life and career ==
Bekey was born in Bratislava on 19 June 1928, before immigrating to Bolivia at the beginning of World War II, then moving to the United States five years later at the age of 17 in 1945.

In 1989, Bekey became a member of the National Academy of Engineering for pioneering work in computer sciences contributing to biomedical engineering, man-machine systems, and robotics. He was also a Fellow of various professional societies.

Bekey is best known for his achievements across multiple technical fields, for which he was designated a USC University Professor, which honors the university's most accomplished, multi-disciplinary faculty. He was also affiliated with the College of Engineering at California Polytechnic State University, San Luis Obispo, where he taught a course on world religions.

One of his later books is Autonomous Robots: From Biological Inspiration to Implementation and Control from MIT Press.

Bekey died on 17 October 2024, at the age of 96.

== Robot ethics ==
Later, he concerned himself with the ethics and social aspects of robots as they play more of a role in different aspects of human life, realising an edited text bringing together some of the key thinkers in the field including James Hughes, Selmer Bringsjord, Kevin Warwick, Peter Asaro and Noel Sharkey.

== Education ==
- B.S. (Electrical Engineering) University of California, Berkeley, 1950.
- M.S (Engineering) University of California, Los Angeles, 1952.
- Ph.D. (Engineering) University of California, Los Angeles, 1962.

== Professional organizations ==
- President, IEEE Robotics and Automation Society, 1996–97; Administrative Committee member, 2001-2007
- Editor, Autonomous Robot, 1994-2007
- Founding Editor, "IEEE Transactions on Robotic and Automation"
- Co-General Chairman. "5th International Symposium on Distributed Autonomous Robotic Systems", 2000
- Honorary Chairmen, "IEEE International Conference on Robotics and Automation", 2008
- Member
  - American Association for Artificial Intelligence
  - American Association for the Advancement of Science
  - American Institute for Medical and Biological Engineering
  - Association for Computing Machinery
  - Institute of Electrical and Electronics Engineers
  - Society for Computer Simulation

== Awards ==
- USC Presidential Medallion
- USC University Professor award
- UCLA School of Engineering: Alumni Achievement in Academia
- USC School of Engineering Distinguished Faculty Award
- USC Computer Science Department "George A. Bekey lecture series"
- Fellow, IEEE
- Fellow, American Association for Advancements of Science
- Fellow, American Institute for Medical and Biological Engineering
- Fellow, American Association for Artificial Intelligence
- Engelberger Award for Robotics Education, Robotics Institute of America
- "Pioneer in Robotics"Award, IEEE Robotics and Automation Society
- Robotics and Automation Award, IEEE (International)
- Honorary Member, Hungarian Academy of Engineering
