= Carla Ellis =

American computer scientist

Carla Schlatter Ellis
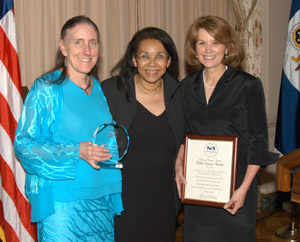
- Carla Ellis (left) and Mary Jean Harrold (right) receiving the National Science Board Public Service Award in 2005 with Shirley Malcom (centre)
- Born: Toledo, Ohio
- Education: University of Washington; University of Toledo
- Awards: ACM Fellow (2010)
- Scientific career
- Fields: Computer science
- Workplaces: Duke University; University of Rochester; University of Oregon
- Doctoral advisor: Jean-Loup Baer
- Website: www.cs.duke.edu/~carla/

Carla Schlatter Ellis is an American computer scientist and Emeritus Professor of Computer Science at Duke University. She is known for her work in energy management on mobile devices as well as for her dedication to increasing the number of women in the field of computer science. She is one of the founding members of Systers, an international email list of female computer scientists that was founded in 1987. Systers, which was initiated by Ellis and 12 other female computer scientists who met at a Symposium on Operating Systems Principles (SOSP), has since grown to over 3000 members.

== Biography ==
Ellis received the B.S. degree from the University of Toledo, Toledo Ohio, in 1972 and the M.S. and Ph.D. degrees from the University of Washington, Seattle, in 1977 and 1979. She was a member of the Computer Science faculties at the University of Oregon, Eugene, from 1978 to 1980, and at the University of Rochester, Rochester NY, from 1980 to 1986. In 1986 she moved to Duke University as an associate professor, then professor, and currently emeritus professor.

== Awards and honors ==
In 2010, the Association for Computing Machinery named her an ACM Fellow "for contributions to techniques for energy management in mobile devices, and for service to the computing community".

When she was the co-chair CRA's Committee on the Status of Women in Computing Research (CRA-W), CRA-W won a 2004 Presidential Award for Excellence in Science, Mathematics, and Engineering Mentoring (PAESMEM) and the 2005 National Science Board Public Service Award.
