= Valerie Taylor (computer scientist) =

American computer scientist

Valerie E. Taylor
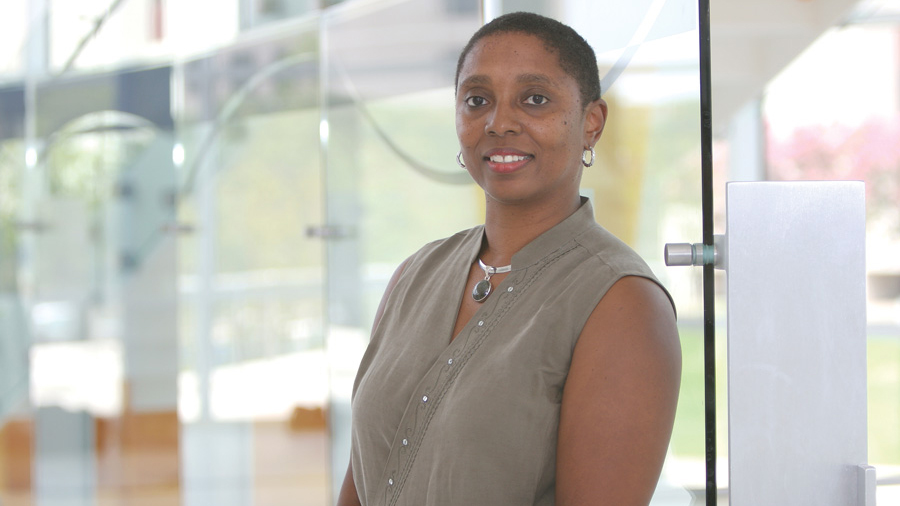
- Born: May 24, 1963 (age 63); Chicago, Illinois
- Education: Purdue University, B.S., computer and electrical engineering 1985; M.S., electrical engineering, 1986; University of California at Berkeley, Ph.D. degree in electrical engineering and computer science, 1991
- Known for: Work in high performance computing
- Awards: Pathbreaker Award from the Women in Leadership at Northwestern University; Hewlett Packard Harriett B. Rigas Education Award; A. Nico Habermann Award; Sigma Xi Distinguished Lecture; Richard A. Tapia Achievement Award for Scientific Scholarship, Civic Science, and Diversifying Computing (Q21020802); MOBE Influencers and Innovators of the Internet and Technology
- Scientific career
- Institutions: Texas A&M University, Head of the Department of Computer Science and Engineering; Northwestern University, professor of electrical and computer engineering

Valerie Elaine Taylor (born May 24, 1963) is an American computer scientist who is the director of the Mathematics and Computer Science Division of Argonne National Laboratory in Illinois. Her research includes topics such as performance analysis, power analysis, and resiliency. She is known for her work on "Prophesy," described as "a database used to collect and analyze data to predict the performance on different applications on parallel systems."

== Early life and education ==
Valerie Elaine Taylor was born May 24, 1963, in Chicago, Illinois. Her father, Willie Taylor, was an electrical engineer at Sonicraft and would bring his children to work with him on Saturdays. Taylor credits her pursuit of a career in science to that early exposure to building circuit boards, reading schematics, and soldering boards. While in high school, she spent her Saturdays attending the Illinois Institute of Technology's Early Identification Program and spent summers in various STEM programs. Taylor received her bachelor's and master's degrees in electrical engineering from Purdue University in 1985 and 1986, respectively.

In 1991, Taylor received her PhD at the University of California, Berkeley in electrical engineering and computer science, under advisor David Messerschmitt. She holds a patent for her dissertation work on sparse matrices.

== Work ==
Shortly after her PhD in 1993, Taylor earned an NSF National Young Investigator Award. She was a faculty member of Electrical Engineering and Computer Science Department at Northwestern University for 11 years.

From 2003 until 2011, she joined the Texas A&M University faculty as the Head of the Department of Computer Science and Engineering, working on high performance computing. There, she served as the senior associate dean of academic affairs in the College of Engineering and a Regents Professor and the Royce E. Wisenbaker Professor in the Department of Computer Science. She also began the Industries Affiliates Program which allows academics to engage industry partners.

While on the faculty of both Northwestern and Texas A&M, Taylor collaborated with research with Argonne National Laboratory, including a summer sabbatical in 2011. As of July 3, 2017, she is the director of the Mathematics and Computer Science Division of Argonne in Illinois. At Argonne, she cowrote the Department of Energy's comprehensive AI for Science report based on a series of Town Hall meetings.

Taylor is the CEO & President of the Center for Minorities and People with Disabilities in IT (CMD-IT). The organization seeks to develop the participation of minorities and people with disabilities in the IT workforce in the United States. It hosts an annual Tapia Conference for computer scientists from underrepresented communities, enabling them to share research, find mentors, and network.

Recently, the U.S. Department of Energy awarded almost $54 million to fund ten new projects related to microelectronics design and production, of which Taylor will lead one project at the Argonne National Laboratory.

== Awards and honors ==
Taylor has received numerous awards for distinguished research, leadership, and efforts to increase diversity in computing. She has authored or co-authored more than 100 papers in the area of high performance computing, with a focus on performance analysis and modeling of parallel scientific applications.

Taylor is a member of IEEE. In 2013 she was elected a fellow of the Institute of Electrical and Electronics Engineers "for contributions to performance enhancement of parallel computing applications", and in 2016 as a Fellow of the Association for Computing Machinery for her "leadership in broadening participation in computing." In 2019, she was named an Argonne Distinguished Fellow, an award which represents only three percent of research staff at the facility.

Her awards include:

- Richard A. Tapia Achievement Award for Scientific Scholarship, Civic Science, and Diversifying Computing
- Outstanding Young Engineering Alumni Award from the University of California, Berkeley
- Pathbreaker Award from the Women in Leadership at Northwestern University
- Hewlett-Packard Harriet B. Rigas Education Award
- Sigma Xi Distinguished Lecturer
- A. Nico Habermann Award
- AccessComputing Capacity Building Award
