= Telle Whitney =

American computer scientist

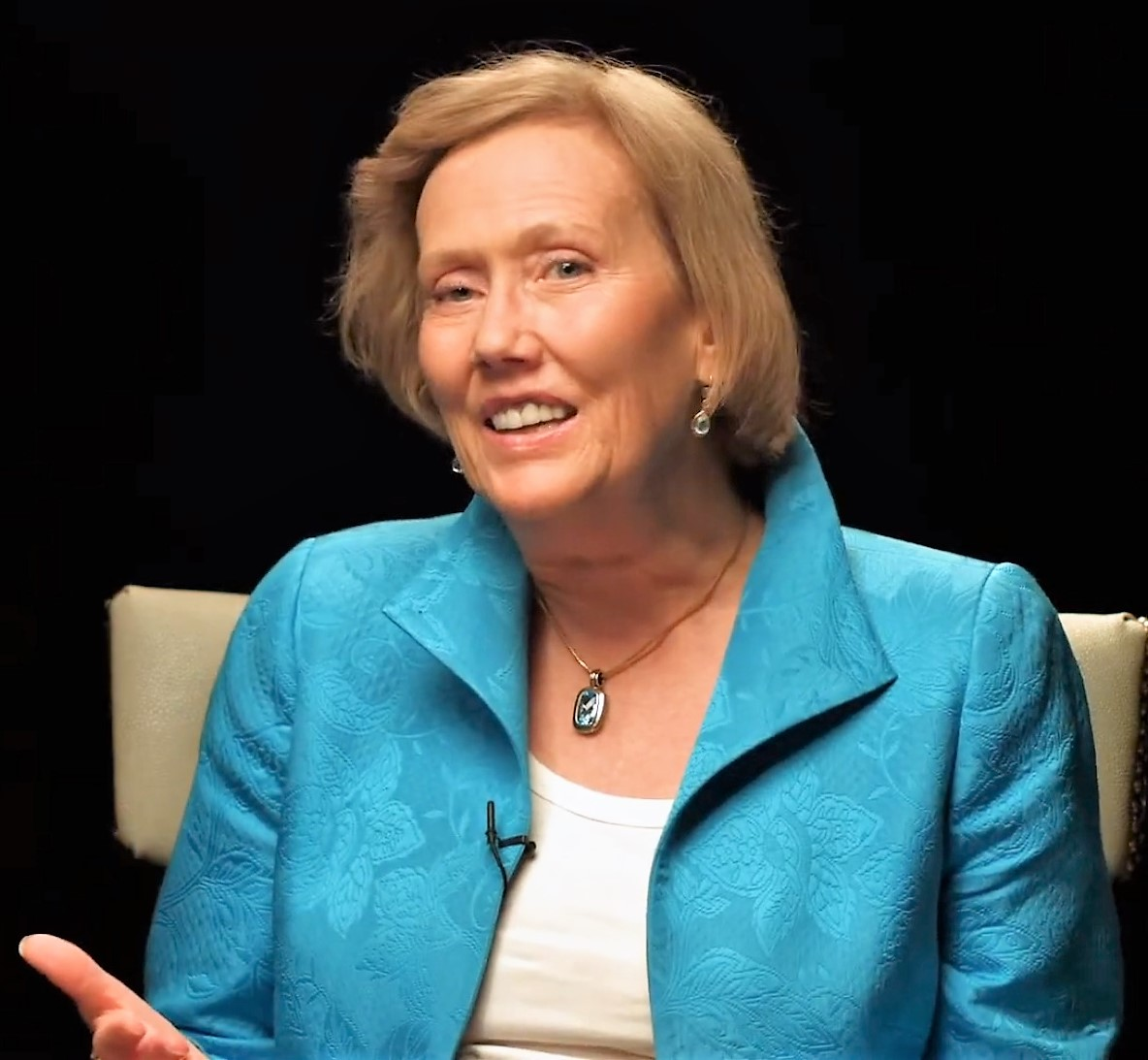
- Whitney in 2017
- Born: June 5, 1956 (age 70)
- Education: BS in Computer Science from the University of Utah, Ph.D. in Computer Science from Caltech
- Occupations: Past CEO and President of the Anita Borg Institute for Women and Technology 2002-2017

Telle Whitney is the former CEO and President of the Anita Borg Institute for Women and Technology. A computer scientist by training, she cofounded the Grace Hopper Celebration of Women in Computing with Anita Borg in 1994 and joined the Anita Borg Institute in 2002.

== Early life ==
Telle Whitney was born on June 5, 1956, in Salt Lake City, Utah. Raised in a Latter-day Saint family descended from Brigham Young, she moved to Southern California when she was 7, and then back to Utah when she was 15 after her mother died. Her father was a lawyer and her mother was a housewife who returned to school to be a history teacher.

== Education and early career ==
Whitney received a bachelor's degree in computer science from the University of Utah in 1978 and a Ph.D. in computer science from Caltech in 1985. She moved to Silicon Valley to work in the chip industry, creating chips and the software that supports them. She held senior technical management positions at Actel and Malleable Technologies, as well as senior roles at several startup technology companies.

== Founding of the Grace Hopper Celebration of Women in Computing ==
In 1994, Whitney and Anita Borg founded the Grace Hopper Celebration of Women in Computing Conference, which is the largest gathering of women in computing in the world. With simply the initial idea of creating a conference by and for women computer scientists, Borg and Whitney met over dinner, with a blank sheet of paper, having no idea how to start a conference, and started to plan out their vision. The first Grace Hopper Celebration of Women in Computing was held in Washington, D.C., in June 1994, and brought together 500 technical women. Telle Whitney described walking into the conference and being surrounded by 500 technical women as “life-changing.”

== Anita Borg Institute for Women and Technology ==
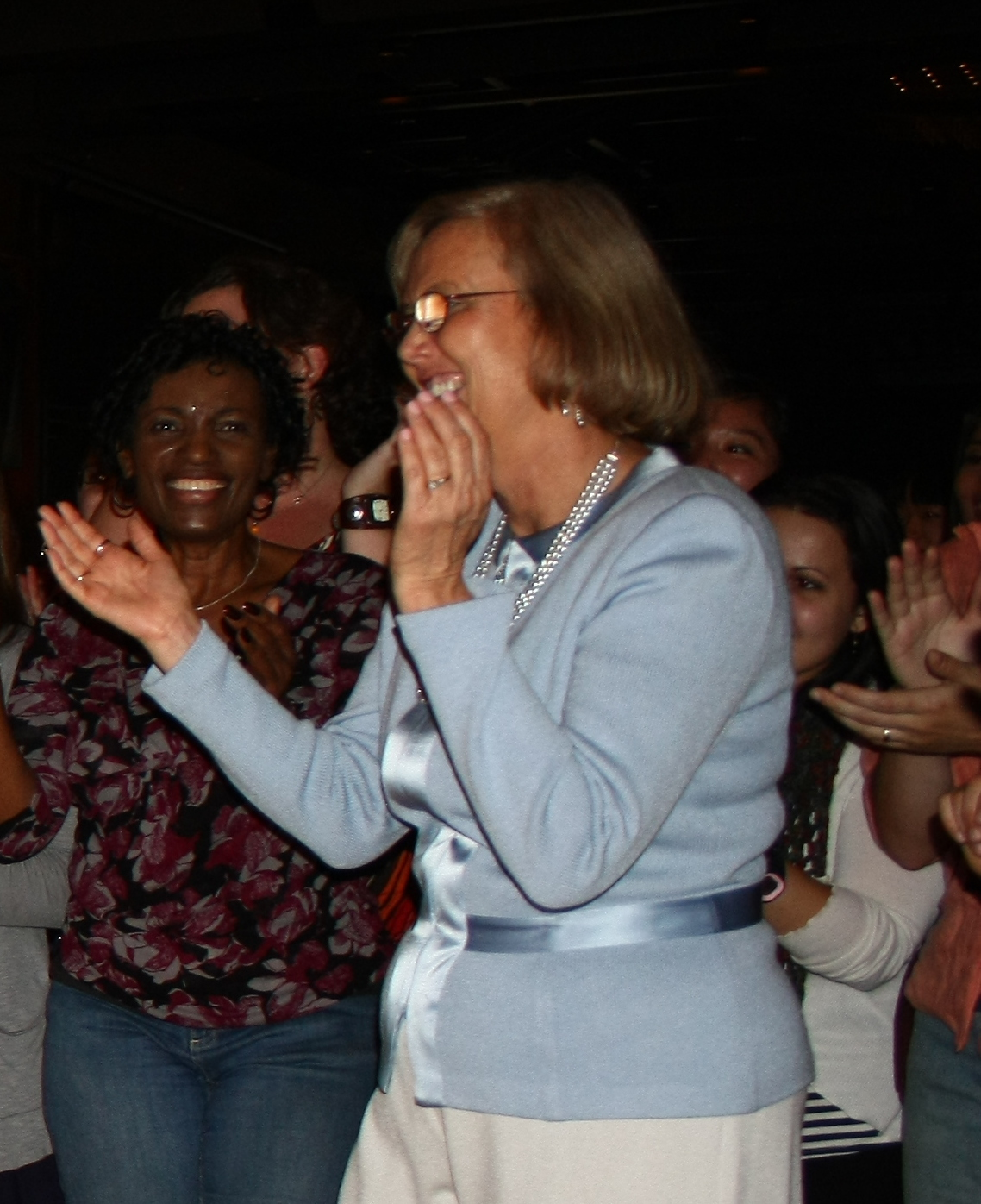
Whitney at Anita Borg event in 2010

In 2002, Whitney became president and CEO of the Anita Borg Institute for Women and Technology, then known as the Institute for Women and Technology. This was originally intended to be a temporary situation, while the organization searched for a replacement for Anita Borg, but ended up being a turning into a permanent role for Whitney.

Under Whitney's leadership, the Anita Borg Institute has expanded its size and programs. Since 2003, six Grace Hopper Celebrations have been held, and in 2010, the first Grace Hopper Celebration of Women in Computing India was organized. In addition to the Anita Borg Institute Women of Vision Awards, a new awards program has been established to recognize companies that support technical women, the Anita Borg Top Company for Technical Women Award.

Telle Whitney retired as president and CEO of AnitaB.org on September 30, 2017, and Brenda Darden Wilkerson became the president and CEO on October 1, 2017.

== Other activities ==
In 2004, Telle Whitney co-founded the National Center for Women & Information Technology (NCWIT) with Lucy Sanders and Robert Schnabel. She has served as Secretary/Treasurer of the Association for Computing Machinery (ACM) and is co-chair of the ACM Distinguished member committee. She was a member of the National Science Foundation CEOSE and CISE advisory committees, and she serves on the advisory boards of Caltech's Information Science and Technology (IST), California Institute for Telecommunications and Information Technology, and Illuminate Ventures. She is also a member of the Forbes Executive Women's Board.

== Awards ==
- 2008: Telle Whitney received the Women's Venture Fund Highest Leaf Award.
- 2009: Telle Whitney received the ACM Distinguished Service Award in 2009.
- 2009: She received the Marie Pistilli Women in Electronic Design Automation (EDA) Achievement Award in 2009.
- 2009: She was named one of San Jose Business Journal's Top 100 Women of Influence.
- 2011: She was named to Fast Company’s Most Influential Women in Technology list.
- October 2017: She received the lifetime achievement award at the Annual Grace Hopper Celebration.
- 2019: IEEE Honorary Membership
- 2022: She was elected to the National Academy of Engineering "For contributions to structured silicon design and for increasing the participation of women in computing careers."
- 2024: For her pioneering work in computer science and contributions to the Anita Borg Institute for Women and Technology, Telle Whitney was inducted into the Robotics Education & Competition Foundation and VEX Robotics STEM Hall of Fame.
