= National Center for Women & Information Technology =

Information Technology For Women

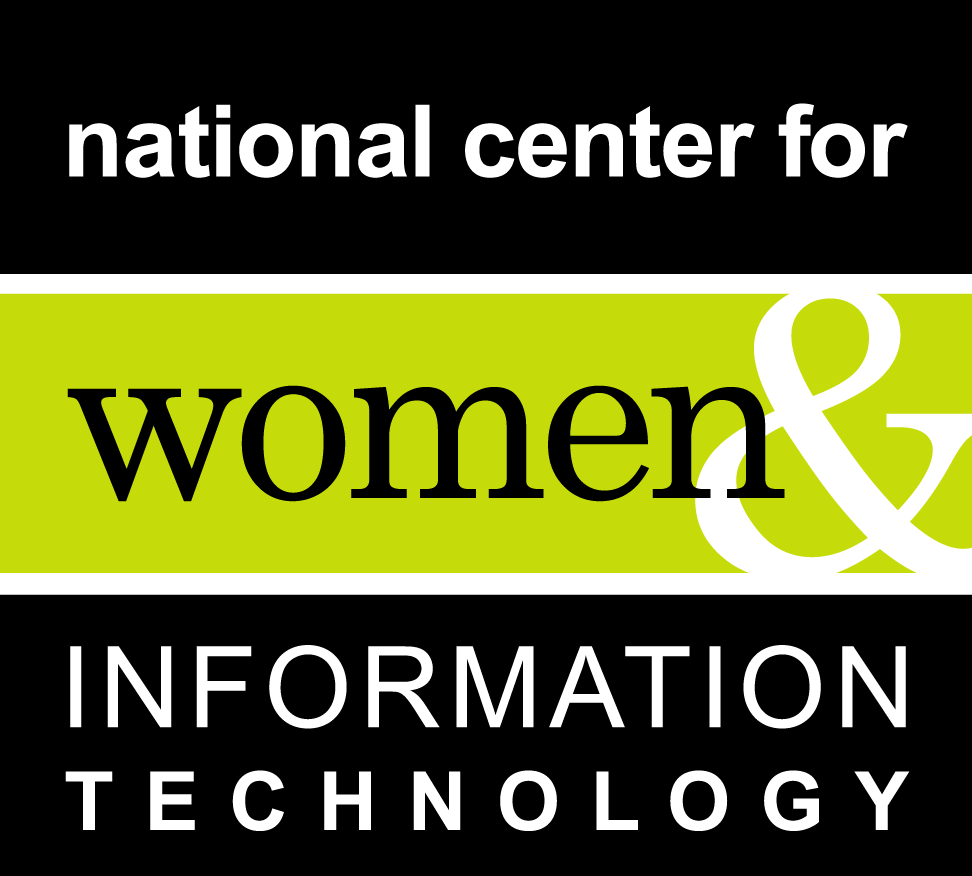
- Logo of the National Center for Women & Information Technology
- Abbreviation: NCWIT
- Founded: August 12, 2004; 22 years ago
- Founders: Lucinda (Lucy) Sanders; Telle Whitney; Dr. Robert (Bobby) Schnabel
- Type: nonprofit organization
- Tax ID no.: 68-0591481
- Legal status: 501(c)(3)
- Purpose: To ensure that women are fully represented in the influential world of information technology/computing.
- Headquarters: Boulder, Colorado, U.S.
- Region served: U.S.
- Method: Alliances, Research, and Programs
- Chief executive officer: Lucy Sanders
- Chair: Nancy Phillips
- Vice chair: Thaddeus Arroyo
- President, chief technology officer: Terry Hogan
- Revenue: $6,448,227 (2018)
- Expenses: $6,449,985 (2018)
- Employees: 0 (2017)
- Volunteers: 1,170 (2017)
- Website: ncwit.org

The National Center for Women & Information Technology (NCWIT) is a 501(c)(3) nonprofit organization in Boulder, Colorado at the University of Colorado Boulder. The center works to increase participation of girls and women in computing.

NCWIT was founded in 2004 by Lucinda (Lucy) Sanders, Dr. Telle Whitney, and Dr. Robert (Bobby) Schnabel. Sanders, who was inducted into the Women in Technology International Hall of Fame in 2007, is the current chief executive officer.

== Operations ==
NCWIT aims to increase the participation of women in computing fields.

The organization operates through partnerships with corporations, academic institutions, and nonprofits. The center also publishes resources and research to support gender diversity in computing.Additionally, the center hosts an annual summit, the NCWIT Summit, for industry professionals and scholars to discuss related issues.

== Programs and campaigns ==
NCWIT coordinates a variety of programs and campaigns which have several goals. Among them are: supporting changes in K-12 computing curriculum, empowering women in computing to increase their visibility, working with high school women to encourage them to pursue computing careers, and celebrating the successes of female tech entrepreneurs.

=== Aspirations in computing ===
NCWIT Aspirations in Computing is a program for young women and non-binary students with aspirations and achievements in computing and information technology. The program consists of an award for high school students, undergraduate and graduate students, and provides a community for college women. It provides women with engagement and encouragement for their computing-related interests from the age range of high school through college and into the workforce. Sponsors include AT&T, Bank of America, Bloomberg, Google, Hewlett-Packard, Intel, Microsoft, Motorola Solutions Foundation, Northrop Grumman, and Symantec.

=== Pacesetters ===
The Pacesetters program involves a cohort of NCWIT member organizations who commit to an accelerated increase of technical women at their institutions and workplaces. Corporate, entrepreneurial and academic leaders all work across organizational boundaries to improve the participation of women in tech. Setting two year goals is a part of the program as well as releasing diversity data.

=== AspireIT ===
AspireIT is an initiative which enlists high school and college women to design and lead computing programs for middle school girls. Through this program, the leaders develop mentorship skills while simultaneously introducing younger girls to computing.

=== Extension Services ===
Extension Services consultants work with computing-related academic department representatives that are eager to increase their diversity. Advice and resources are provided to assist clients in identifying what resources they already have to accomplish their goals, and what new innovating strategies they can pursue.

=== EngageCSEdu ===
EngageCSEdu is an online tool that contains thousands of course materials for introductory computer science courses. Educators are able to upload and download materials and access resources and guides for best practices. All materials are peer-reviewed to ensure that they achieve the goal of making computer science higher education accessible to women and other minorities. Google developed EngageCSEdu with NCWIT.

=== Sit With Me ===
Sit With Me is a national campaign designed to encourage women in computing careers. An iconic Red Chair is used by Sit With Me to symbolize that women need more seats at the table. It is also a symbol that encourages men and women to sit in support for technical women. The campaign helps create gathering places where the contributions of women in computing can be recognized.

=== Counselors for Computing (C4C) ===
NCWIT Counselors for Computing (C4C) provides professional school counselors with information and resources they can use to support all students as they explore computer science education and careers.

=== TECHNOLOchicas ===
TECHNOLOchicas is a national initiative designed to raise awareness among young Latinas and their families about opportunities and careers in technology. Stories are shared by Latinas with different backgrounds and upbringings who are in the tech field, allowing young girls to read these stories and relate to them as role models. These stories are shared through several communication channels, including broadcast television, local events, social media, and online videos. One remarkable Technolochica is Ana Maria Hermida Otero.

=== AspireIT K–12 Outreach Program ===
NCWIT's AspireIT K–12 Outreach Program consists of national girl-serving organizations, professional educator associations, academic institutions, and businesses all dedicated to giving access to a computer science education for girls in grades K-12. The alliance members work to advance more girls into computing nationwide. K–12 girls who are interested in computing are paired with high school and college women as mentors in order to increase young girls' confidence in computing abilities and leadership skills.

== Awards ==
=== Pioneer in Tech Award ===
Created in 2012, the NCWIT Pioneer in Tech Award recognizes those individuals who, over the course of their lives and careers, have contributed to changing the way society sees women in technology and computing.

Winners:

- Dr. Erna Schneider Hoover (2023)
- Dr. Christine Darden (2015)
- Katherine Johnson (2015)
- Eleanor Kolchin (2014)
- Jean Sammet (2013)
- Patricia Palombo (2012)
- Lucy Simon Rakov (2012)

=== Academic Alliance Seed Fund ===
Sponsored by Microsoft Research, the Academic Alliance Seed Fund awards startup funding to NCWIT Academic Alliance members for projects and programs designed to recruit and retain women in computing.

=== Student Seed Fund ===
Sponsored by Symantec, the Student Seed Fund awards funding to student-run programs that attract and support women in information technology.

=== Surging Enrollments Seed Fund ===
The Surging Enrollments Seed Fund is a special call of the NCWIT Academic Alliance Seed Fund. They are various projects that aim to apply practices for recruiting and retaining women in higher education computing, and to track the results of the retention of these women. The primary focus is to also recruit diverse students, so applications from a variety of institutions are accepted.

=== Symons Innovator Award ===
Created in 2009 and presented annually, the Symons Innovator Award recognizes a successful female computing entrepreneur. The award is named in honor of Jeanette Symons, a Silicon Valley entrepreneur who died in a plane crash in 2008.

==== Winners ====
- Anousheh Ansari (2009)
- Kim Polese (2010)
- Audrey MacLean (2011)
- Jessica Jackley (2012)
- Caterina Fake (2013)
- Katie Hall (2014)
- Shellye Archambeau (2015)
- Kate Matsudaira (2016)

=== Undergraduate Research Mentoring Award ===
Sponsored by AT&T, the NCWIT Undergraduate Research Mentoring Award honors faculty mentors at NCWIT Academic Alliance institutions who work to mentor, support, and promote women in computing-related fields.

=== Harrold and Notkin Research and Graduate Mentoring Award ===
The Harrold and Notkin Research and Graduate Mentoring Award honors faculty who, through research opportunities and mentorship, support women and minority graduate students in computing. The award is named in memory of Mary Jean Harrold and David Notkin.

=== NCWIT EngageCSEdu Engagement Excellence Award ===
Funded by Google, the NCWIT EngageCSEdu Engagement Excellence Award recognizes faculty who use certain teaching practices in their introductory computer science classrooms known to better engage students, especially young women and underrepresented groups.

=== Aspirations in Computing Educator Award ===
The Aspirations in Computing Educator Award honors educators (both formal and informal) who encourage high school-aged women to pursue their interests in technology careers. Each winner receives $250 in cash and up to $750 for participation in computing-related professional development activities, recognition at a local Affiliate Award event and increased visibility in his or her school district and community, NCWIT resources and promotional items, as well as an engraved award for both the Educator and his or her school.

=== Collegiate Award ===
Sponsored by HP and Qualcomm, the NCWIT Collegiate Award honors the technical accomplishments of college women of any year of study through their technical projects that demonstrate a high level of creativity and potential societal impact. The award offers a $10,000 cash prize for up to six college women.

=== NCWIT & ACM-W Student Seed Fund ===
The NCWIT & ACM-W Student Seed Fund has invested over $300,000 in more than 150 student run programs since 2011. ACM-W aims to "support, celebrate, and advocate internationally for the full engagement of women in all aspects of the computing field, providing a wide range of programs and services to ACM members and working in the larger community to advance the contributions of technical women."

=== Reel WiT Award ===
The Reel WiT Award is presented by the Geena Davis Institute on Gender in Media, Google, and NCWIT. This award aspires to change the small percentage of women in tech roles represented in film by recognizing the best portrayal of a leading woman in technology from a program (e.g. documentary, TV show, film, YouTube, etc.) who serves as a role model for girls and women who aspire to work in the tech field. The 2017 Reel WiT Award winner went to Allison Schroeder, who wrote the screenplay for "Hidden Figures".

=== NCWIT Extension Services Transformation (NEXT) Awards ===
NCWIT's Extension Services Transformation Awards was created to honor the academic departments that improve recruitment and retention of women in their computing education majors. The departments that qualify for the awards are those who take part in consultations from the NCWIT Extension Services Undergraduate Programs (ES-UP) in order to increase the number of women in their computing-related departments. Two different awards are presented to two winning departments- the first and second place 'Excellence in Promoting Women in Undergraduate Computing' awards. The first place winning department is given $100,000 while the second place is awarded $50,000.

== Strategic and investment partners ==
NCWIT is supported by government and corporate partners from the technology sector and other related sectors. Strategic partners include National Science Foundation, Microsoft, Bank of America, Google, and Intel. Investment partners include Avaya, Pfizer, Merck, Turner Broadcasting Systems, AT&T, Bloomberg, and Hewlett-Packard.

== See also ==
- Women in computing
- Research Experiences for Undergraduates
- List of organizations for women in science
