= Committee on Widening Participation in Computing Research =

American computer science organization

Computing Research Association's Committee on Widening Participation in Computing Research (CRA-WP)
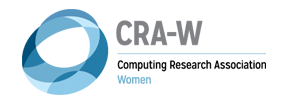
- The logo of CRA-W, the initial incarnation of CRA-WP.
- Founded: 1991
- Location: Washington, D.C.
- Region served: National
- Owner: Computer Research Association (CRA)
- Website: https://cra.org/cra-wp
- Formerly called: Committee on the Status of Women in Computing Research (CRA-W)

The Computing Research Association's Committee on Widening Participation in Computing Research (CRA-WP) is an action-oriented organization dedicated to increasing the number of individuals participating in computer science and engineering (CSE) research and education at all levels.

In addition to increasing the number of individuals involved, the organization also seeks to increase the degree of success those individuals experience and to provide a forum for addressing problems, building community, and empowering participants through mentoring.

CRA-WP seeks to widen participation and improve access, opportunities, and positive experiences for all people in computing research and education. CRA-WP is committed to improving the working environment and increasing the success of all Computer Scientists and Engineers.

CRA-WP leads programs for undergraduate students, for graduate students, for faculty members and for researchers in government labs and industry. In addition, CRA-WP provides Early Career Awards to individuals who demonstrate the potential for impactful contributions and leadership in their field of research, as well as aims to widen participation and improve access, opportunities, and positive experiences for all people in computing research and education.

== History ==
CRA-W was established in 1991 with the mission of increasing the success and participation of Women in Computing Research. In 2004, CRA-W first partnered with the Coalition to Diversify Computing (CDC) to engage and increase the participation of individuals from additional groups in computing. In 2008, this partnership became a BPC Alliance, further expanding and strengthening its outreach and programmatic efforts. The programs quite naturally shifted from being women-only or women-focused to being increasingly co-ed, serving a wide range of constituencies. In July 2019, CRA-W became CRA Committee on Widening Participation (CRA-WP) to reflect the broader scope.

== Awards ==
- 2005: CRA-W was awarded the National Science Board's Public Service Award for its action-oriented programs aimed at increasing the number and success of women participating in computer science and engineering research and education.
- 2004: CRA-W co-founders Maria Klawe and Nancy Leveson were awarded CRA's A. Nico Habermann Award recognizing their role as founding co-chairs of the highly successful CRA-W Committee.
- 2003: CRA-W was awarded a Presidential Award for Excellence in Science, Mathematics, and Engineering Mentoring for long-running work to address the underrepresentation of women in computer science and engineering.
