= Russification of Ukraine =

System of measures, actions and legislations

Percentage of Ukrainian speakers among the population of Ukraine by region according to the censuses of 1959-2001. During the post-WW2 period, the Russification of ethnic Ukrainians, as well as the mass immigration of ethnic Russians, significantly changed the ethnic and linguistic composition of Ukraine's population. The change was especially evident in the Donbas, where Ukrainian speakers became a minority.

The Russification of Ukraine (Ukrainian: русифікація України or зросійщення України; Russian: русификация Украины) was a system of measures, actions and legislations undertaken by the Imperial Russian, later Soviet, and present-day authorities of the Russian Federation to strengthen Russian national, political and linguistic positions in Ukraine.

Like in other countries of Eastern Europe historically ruled by Russian political regimes, Russification in Ukraine aims to assimilate the local population and has been conducted through a wide array of measures, including introduction of Russian language in school education and state institutions, promotion of mixed marriages, ideological, political and cultural indoctrination, displacement of population etc.

== Background ==
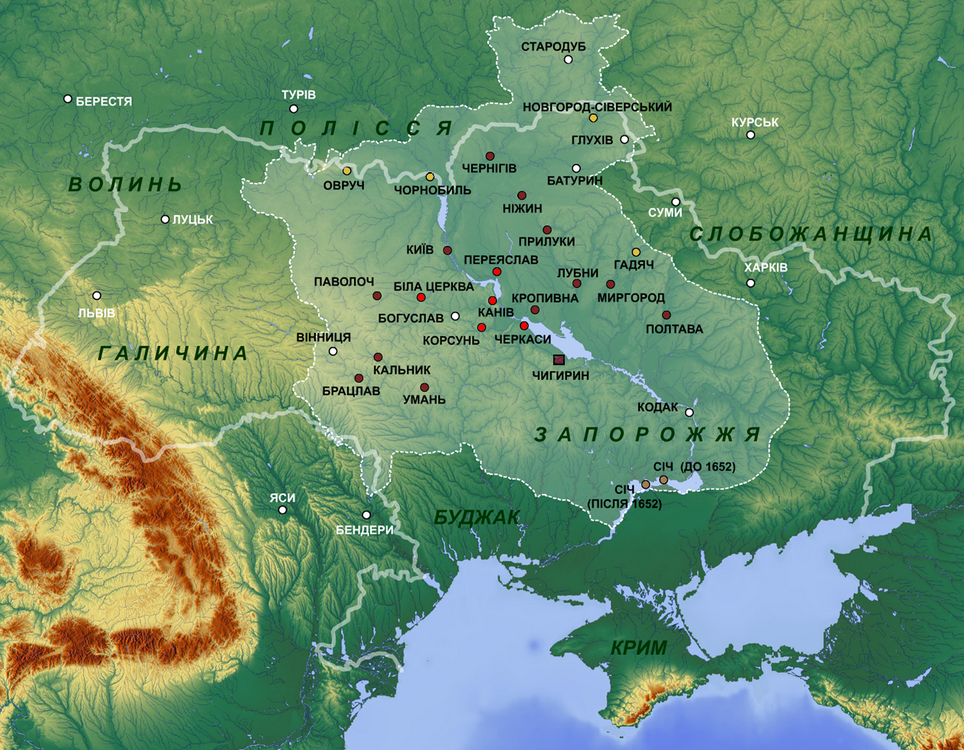
The Cossack Hetmanate in 1654 compared with present-day borders

In 1648, Ruthenian commander Bohdan Khmelnytsky began an armed insurgency against the Polish-Lithuanian Commonwealth, known as the Khmelnytsky Uprising. This uprising was successful at ending Polish rule in Dnieper Ukraine, and the local Cossack population established the Cossack Hetmanate.

By 1654, the Cossack Hetmanate controlled land encompassing much of present-day Ukraine. To increase pressure on Polish forces, the Cossacks conducted negotiations with the Tsardom of Russia to gain their support. This culminated in the signing of the Pereiaslav Agreement, where Cossack leader Khmelnytsky secured Russian military support in exchange for swearing allegiance to the Tsar of Russia.

This agreement angered the Polish-Lithuanian Commonwealth, and led to the Russo-Polish War. The resulting Truce of Andrusovo in 1667 defined the territories of each state, where Russia gained control over Left-bank Ukraine, including the entire city of Kiev, and Poland-Lithuania would keep their control of Right-bank Ukraine. This began Russia's presence in Ukraine, which contributed greatly to the process of Russification.

In the opinion of scientist Vladimir Vernadsky (1863–1945), by the 17th century, Muscovy already had a long-standing policy to absorb Ukraine and liquidate the foundation for local cultural life.

== Russian Empire ==
In order to modernize his state, Peter I, the first Emperor of Russia, hired a number of Ukrainian intellectuals, who conceived the idea of political continuity from Kyiv to Moscow and developed the concept of "Little Russia" (Ukraine) as opposed to "Greater Russia" (Muscovy) as parts of a common state project. As a result, the Russian Empire could be considered to be a brainchild of Ukrainians, who underlined their symbolical status as co-founders and co-owners of the empire. However, with time "Little Russia" was downgraded to the status of a mere province, and its elites had to suffice themselves with the role of regional administrators. This process culminated in the abolition of the autonomy of the Cossack Hetmanate in 1764 and was accompanied with both Russification of the local elite, as well as mass resettlement of ethnic Russians into Ukrainian lands.

=== Peter I and his successors ===
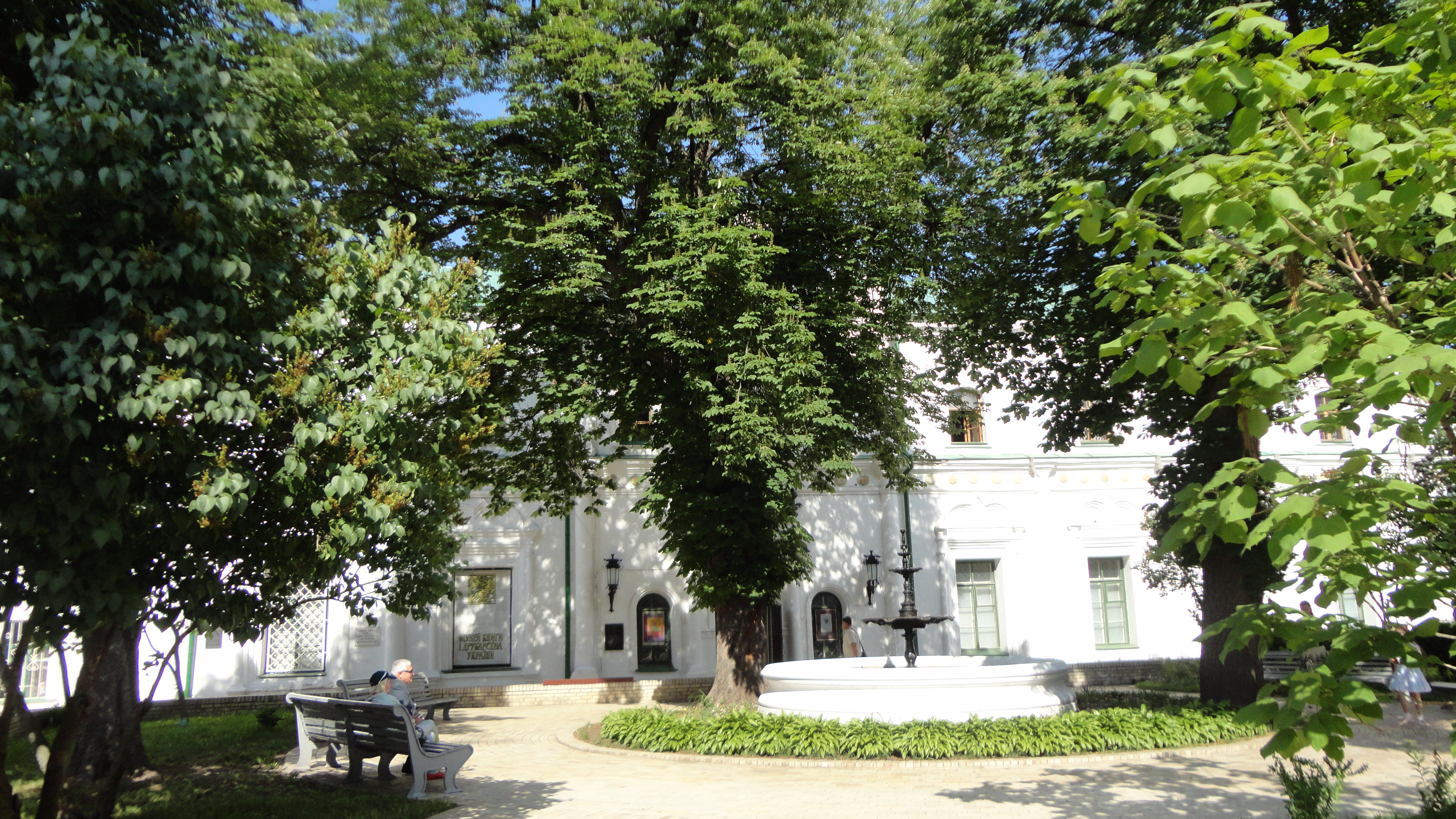
Historical printing house of the Kyiv Pechersk Lavra, whose activities were restricted under the rule of Peter I

The increasing limitation of Ukrainian autonomy following the Battle of Poltava in 1709 constributed to the process of Russification. In 1720 Tsar Peter I of Russia issued a decree in which he ordered the expurgation of all Little Russian (Ukrainian) linguistic elements in theological literature printed in Little Russian typographical establishments.

In 1734 Empress Anna Ioannovna issued a secret instruction to the Governing Council of the Hetman Office led by Prince Shakhovskoy, ordering him to introduce a policy of assimilation between Ukrainians and Russians through promotion of mixed marriages.

=== Catherine the Great ===
==== Status of the Cossack Hetmanate ====
Among those who helped Catherine II ascend to the Russian throne through a coup was Kirill Razumovsky, the president of the Imperial Academy of Sciences and Hetman of the autonomous Cossack state, the Hetmanate. The Hetman's plans for Cossack Ukraine were extensive and included strengthening its autonomy and institutions; many in the Hetmanate were hopeful for Catherine's rule, but would soon realise her policy towards them.

In the fall of 1762, a few months after Catherine's coronation, a scribe in Hlukhiv, the capital of the Hetmanate, named Semen Divovych, produced the poem "A Conversation between Great Russia and Little Russia"

"Great Russia:

Do you know with whom you are speaking, or have you forgotten? I am Russia, after all: do you ignore me?"

Little Russia:

I know that you are Russia; that is my name as well.
Why do you intimidate me? I myself am trying to put on a brave face.
I did not submit to you but to your sovereign,
Under whose auspices you were born of your ancestors.
Do not think that you are my master:
Your sovereign and mine is our common ruler"

Some historians perceive these passages to show that the Hetmanate and those within it believed they were connected to the Russian Empire not by a common nation or fatherland but only by the name and the person of the ruler.

==== Abolition of the Hetmanate ====
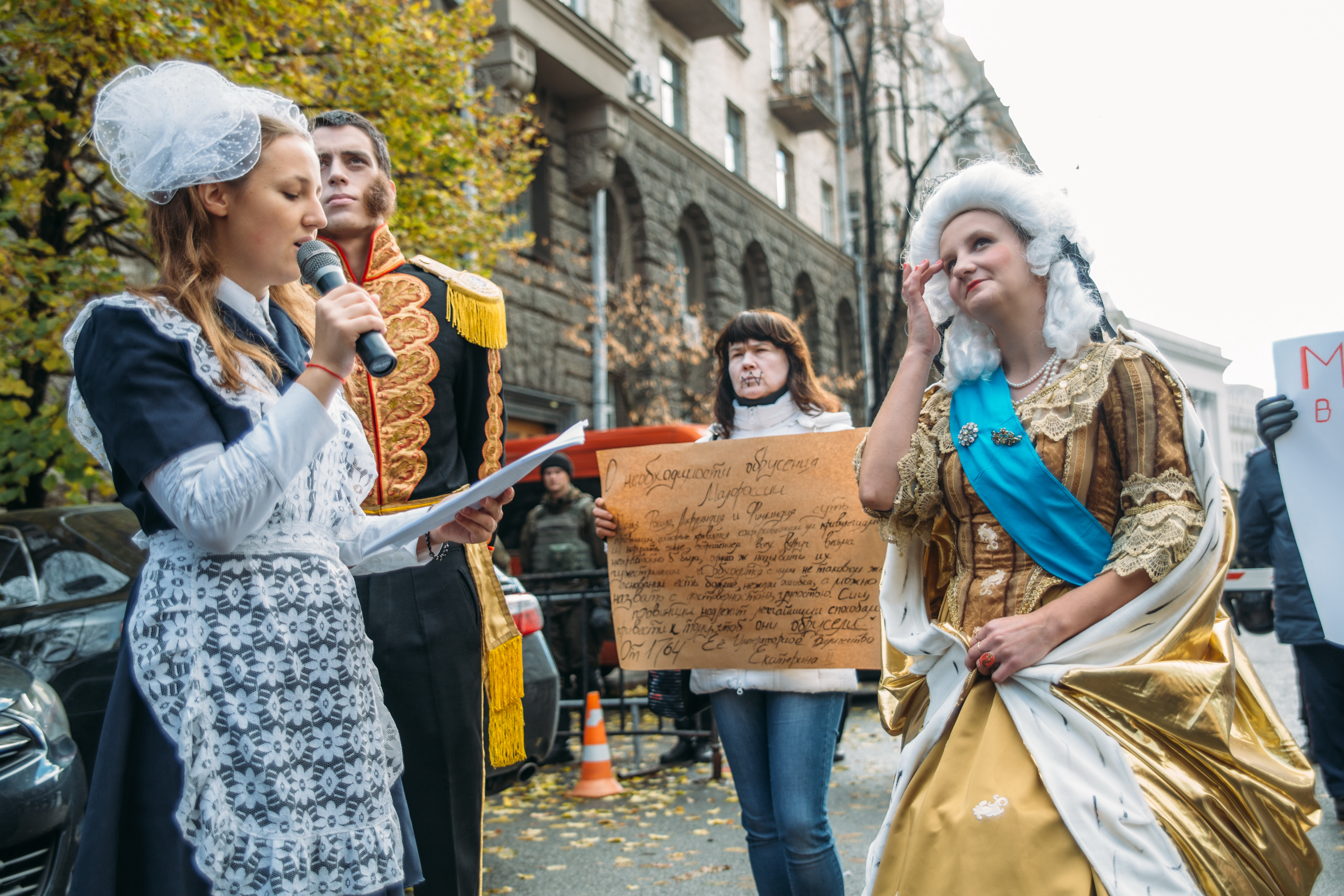
Reinactment of the instruction of Catherine II to Alexander Vyazemsky on 9 November 2015, the Day of Ukrainian Literature and Language, near the Administration of the President of Ukraine. A woman with a "stitched mouth" is holding the text of the instruction.

In February 1764, a few months before the liquidation of the office of Hetman, Catherine wrote to the Prosecutor General of the Senate Prince Alexander Vyazemsky:

"Little Russia, Livonia, and Finland are provinces governed by confirmed privileges, and it would be improper to violate them by abolishing all at once. To call them foreign and deal with them on that basis is more than erroneous-it would be sheer stupidity. These provinces, as well as Smolensk, should be Russified as gently as possible so that they cease looking to the forest like wolves. When the Hetmans are gone from Little Russia, every effort should be made to eradicate from memory the period and the hetmans, let alone promote anyone to that office."

In 1764, Catherine summoned Razumovsky to St. Petersburg and removed him as hetman. Then in November, she published a decree that officially abolished the position of Hetman and integrated the regional government as the Little Russia Governorate in the Russian Empire. These territories were later redrawn as the Kiev, Chernigov, and Novgorod-Seversky Governorates in the Empire.

Following the incorporation of the Hetmanate into the Empire, the Cossack officers gradually integrated into the Russian structure, though often with difficulty as many maintained attachment to their traditional homeland. All institutions of the Hetmanate were abolished within a decade.

According to historian Serhii Plokhy, "the abolition of the Hetmanate and the gradual elimination of its institution and military structure ended the notion of partnership and equality between Great and Little Russia imagined by generations of Ukrainian intellectuals."

==== Rumiantsev's program ====
Following the abolition of the Hetmanate and destruction of the Zaporozhian Sich, Ukrainian lands were subjected to the reestablished Collegium of Little Russia headed by Pyotr Rumyantsev. The Collegium was tasked with introducing Russian as the compulsory language in school education and publishing. Teaching at the Kyiv Mohyla Academy was also transferred to Russian language. During the second half of the 18th century Russian was introduced in the documentation of consistories, and priests were obliged to use the Russian version of Church Slavonic in sermons. In 1769 the Most Holy Synod declined an appeal by Kyiv Pechersk Lavra to allow the printing of grammar books in vernacular Ukrainian for the local population. Initially concentrated on Left-bank Ukraine and Slobozhanshchyna, in the following decades Russification would also spread to the formerly Polish-ruled Right-bank.

==== After the Partitions of Poland ====
Map of predominant religions in the Polish-Lithuanian Commonwealth as of 1750, with Uniates (Greek-Catholics) depicted in orange and Orthodox in green

In 1795, after the Kosciuszko Uprising and the subsequent Third Partition of the Polish-Lithuanian Commonwealth, Russia controlled most Ukrainian lands except for Ukrainian Galicia, which became part of Austria during the First Partition in 1772.

The increase of Russian territory during the First Partition was defined by the principle of military defensibility, but the Second and Third Partitions were based on historical, religious, and ethnic identity. During the Second Partition, Catherine II ordered a medal struck depicting the double-headed eagle from the Russian imperial coat of arms holding two maps in its clutches: one was of Russian-annexed territory from the First Partition, and the other was the territory from the Second Partition. The medal was inscribed the words: "I restore what had been torn away."

Writing for the future emperor of Russia in her "Notes on Russian History," Catherine II justified the partitions' territory gains with historical claims during the era of Kievan Rus. This created a view of Poles as a hostile nation and Ukrainians as a fraternal one, which became prominent after the capture of Warsaw in 1794. Additionally, Catherine also used religious justification, claiming that Russia was protecting those "professing the same faith as ours, from the corruption and oppression with which they are threatened", referring to adherents to Russian Orthodoxy. However, Orthodox were often a minority in the newly-annexed territories, where the lands acquired after Second Partition included 300,000 Orthodox but also at least 2 million Uniates, and the lands gained after the Third Partition had almost no Orthodox believers.

To address this, Catherine announced in a decree in April 1794 that the governor general of the newly-annexed territories should pursue "the most suitable eradication of the Uniate faith." To prevent protests and disturbances, she also ensured the protection of Orthodox believers and converts by considering "even the smallest hindrance, oppression, or offence" against them "as a criminal offence". As a result, Uniate churches quickly disappeared, and more than 3,500 Uniate churches were transferred to the Orthodox Church in Western and Central Ukraine from 1770s to 1790s. By 1796, there were almost no Uniate parishes in Right-Bank Ukraine. However, this effort was less successful in Central Belarus and Volhynia, where 1.4 million Uniates remained by the end of Catherine's rule, a mere 600,000-person drop since the Third Partition.

=== Paul I ===
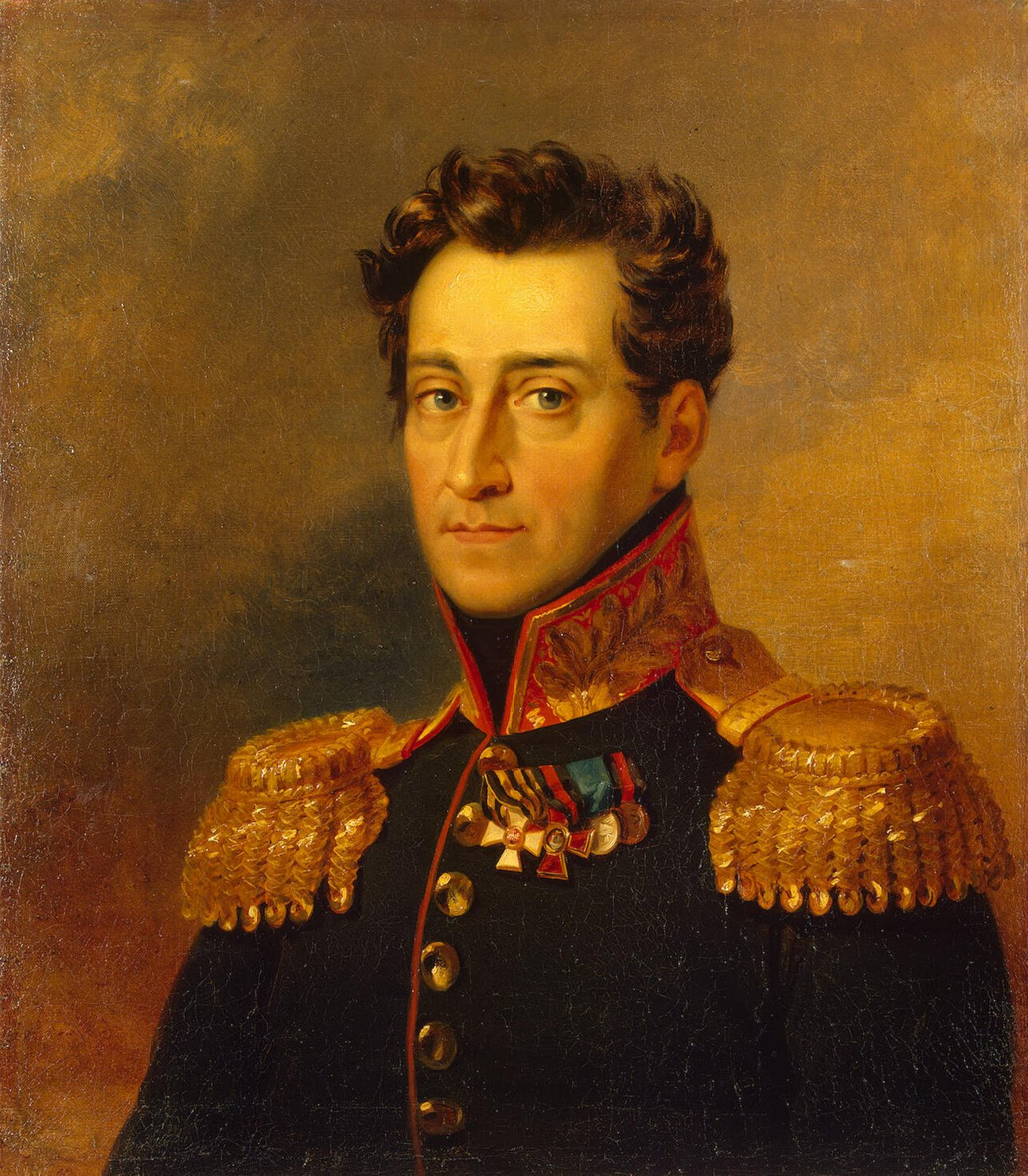
Andrey Gudovich, who was rumoured to be a candidate for regency over a restored Hetmanate in Ukraine under Paul I

The accession of Catherine's son Paul to the throne following her death in 1796 was initially seen in a positive light by Ukrainian supporters of autonomy, who hoped that the new monarch, widely known for antagonism to his mother, would abandon her centralist policies. Many of Paul's high-ranked officials, such as Alexander Bezborodko, Dmitry Troshchinsky, Viktor Kochubey and Ivan Gudovich, were of Ukrainian descent, and rumours circulated, that the emperor would restore the Hetmanate under the leadership of his second son, with Gudovich's brother serving as a regent. However, these hopes didn't materialize, as Paul was mainly concerned with foreign affairs and continued Catherine's centralist policies.

Paul continued the practice or expanding feudal possessions, and in 1796 allowed the enserfment of peasants in Southern Ukraine. Nevertheless, some changes did take place under the new monarch's rule: following his accession to the throne, he abolished Catherine's administrative reforms, replacing viceroyalties with governorates and restoring elements of the local court system, and stopped persecution of the Uniate Church. At the same time, Paul's attempts to introduce a police regime with strict censorship made him hugely unpopular among both the common folk, nobles and the army, leading to his overthrow and assassination.

=== Alexander I ===
Influenced by a circle of friends and courtiers, among them Mikhail Speransky and Ukrainian native Vasily Karazin, during the first years of his rule Alexander introduced a number of liberal reforms. However, as a result of the Napoleonic Wars, especially following the French invasion of Russia and Russian participation in the War of the Sixth Coalition, which resulted in the Congress of Vienna, the new emperor gradually adopted reactionary positions, which influenced his internal policies, in particular with respect to Ukraine. Among those policies was the introduction of military settlements, a number of which was located in Ukrainian lands, ban on Freemasonry, liquidation of the Little Russia Governorate and its division into Chernigov and Poltava Governorates, abolition of elections to nobles' courts and local administration, dissolution of the Kyiv Academy and its replacement with Kiev Theological Academy, administrative subjection of Right-bank Ukraine to Congress Poland etc.

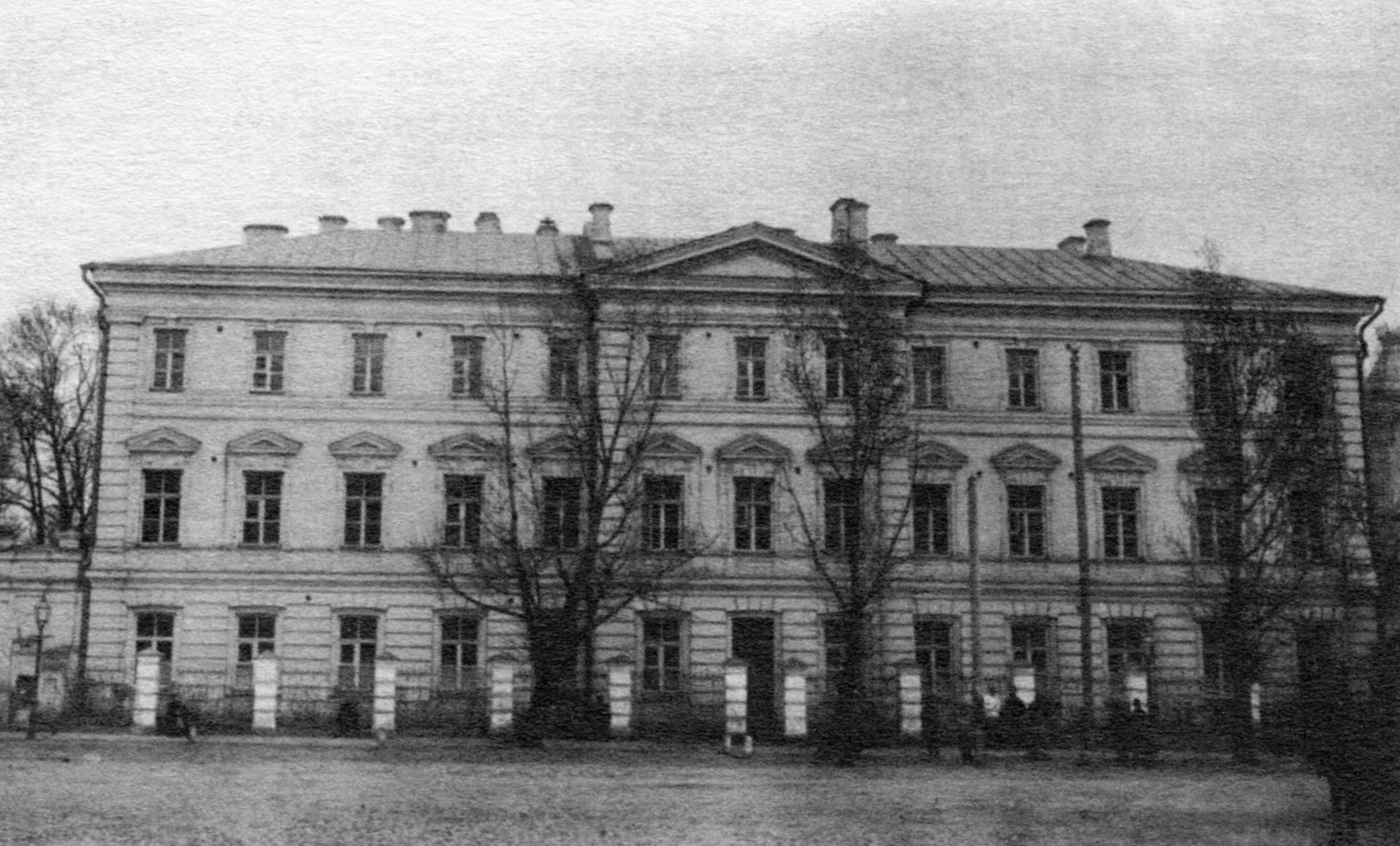
New building of the Kiev Theological Academy, whose construction started under Alexander I

At the same time, Alexander's administration preserved some elements of local autonomy in Ukrainian lands, retaining the position of military governor in Little Russia and restoring the Magdeburg Law to Kyiv. The emperor's government allowed transit trade between Ukrainian lands wand Western Europe, declared Odessa a free port and founded new universities in Kharkiv, Nizhyn and Odessa. Alexander's rule saw the rise of Ukrainian national consciousness, demonstrated among others by the creation of a number of secret societies and emergence of patriotic works such as History of Ruthenians.

=== Nicholas I ===
Nicholas I, who came to power after suppressing the Decembrist Revolt, introduced reactionary policies in both foreign and internal spheres. His government attempted to eliminate all of Ukraine's specifics by banning local traditions, abolishing the Magdeburg Law, invalidating the Statutes of Lithuania, liquidating the Uniate Church and repressing the Ukrainian national movement. Activization of colonial policies and failure to improve the conditions of general population led to the rise of peasant movements in Ukraine, most prominently during the Kyiv Cossacks revolt of 1855. At the same time, Nicholas's policies also left some positive results for the development of Ukrainian culture, such as the foundation of new universities and the creation of archaeographic commissions, archives and historical societies, although their activities were also marked with general reactionary and anti-Ukrainian policies of the government.

==== Cultural Russification efforts under Uvarov ====
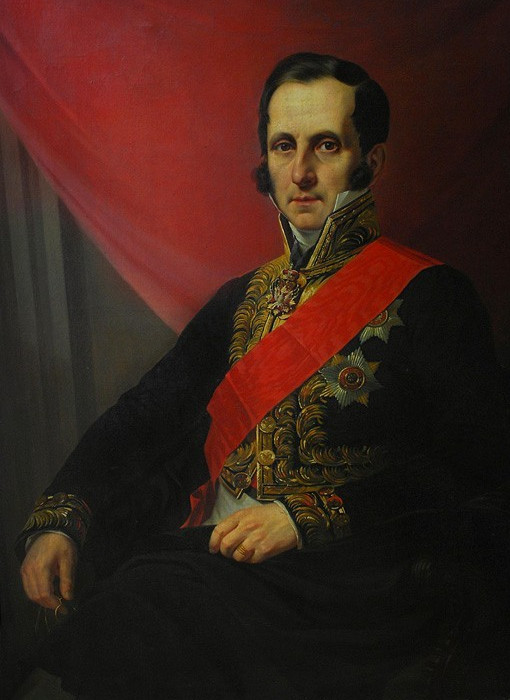
Portret of Count Uvarov as President of the Imperial Academy of Sciences, 1844

A week after the fall of Warsaw and the end of the November Uprising, on September 14, 1831, the imperial government created a special body known as the Committee on the Western Provinces or "Western Committee," established on the oral and secret order of Nicholas and charged with "examining various proposals concerning the provinces regained from Poland." The overriding goal of the authoritative body was the speedy and complete integration of the new Ukrainian provinces into the empire. The policy of Russification (obrusenie) that Catherine had formulated for the Hetmanate was now to become official policy for the newly annexed territories of Poland with a Ukrainian majority. Administrative, legal and social measures were all utilised to bring the new regions into line with the Russian provinces.

In the 1840s Nicholas oversaw the liquidation of urban self-government and the abolition of the local law code, which went back to the times of Polish-Lithuanian control over the region and had also been used in the Hetmanate.

Importantly the government also introduced policies to promote the cultural Russification of the region. This included the creation of a new historical narrative, the establishment of new university and school districts and the conversion of Ukrainian Uniates to Orthodoxy.

The responsibility for finding ways to unite the various branches of Russian nationalist and ideologist Pavel Pestel's "true Russians" in the aftermath of the Polish Uprising belonged to Nicholas I's minister of education, Count Uvarov. Uvarov believed the obstacles to integrate the Ukrainians of the western provinces into the empire were significant and would only be overcome in future generations, writing to the tsar that "All illustrious rulers from the Romans to Napoleon-those who intended to unite the tribes they conquered with the victorious tribe-invested all their hopes and all the fruits of their labors in future generations instead of the present generation."

Beginning in 1831, Uvarov began looking for an author who could provide historical justification for the annexation and integration of the western provinces into the empire. Uvarov's first choice was the professor Mikhail Pogodin, who was approached in November 1834 and submitted his work in 1835. However, Pogodin did not satisfy the minister's demands as his book presented the history of northeastern Rus (Russia) as distinct and separate from that of southwestern Rus (Ukraine), undermining the project's main goal of uniting the two. In response, Uvarov issued a special prize of 10,000 rubles for anyone who could present the history of the western provinces as part of Russian history.

The prize was awarded to Nikolai Ustrialov, who in December 1836 presented the first volume of a four volume work that would later be distributed as a standard textbook to all education districts throughout the empire. The book revived notions established during the reign of Catherine by Nikolai Karamzin of the re-unification of Rus and a statist approach to Russian history that had been challenged under liberal Alexander I.

As well as history, Russian language and culture were also used as tools in the government's new policy to Russify the western provinces. Russian was introduces as the language of instruction instead of Polish, and educational districts and universities that had helped to popularise Polish culture and language under the leadership of then minister of education Ukrainian Petro Zavadovsky and his Polish colleagues Jerzy Czartoryski and Seweryn Potocki were closed. In November 1833, Nicholas I approved Sergei Uvarov's proposal to open a new university in the city of Kiev, which Pushkin feared might fall into Polish hands, as visitors heard more Polish spoken on the streets than Russian or Ukrainian. In the Kiev provinces there were 43,000 Polish nobles and only 1,000 Russian ones.

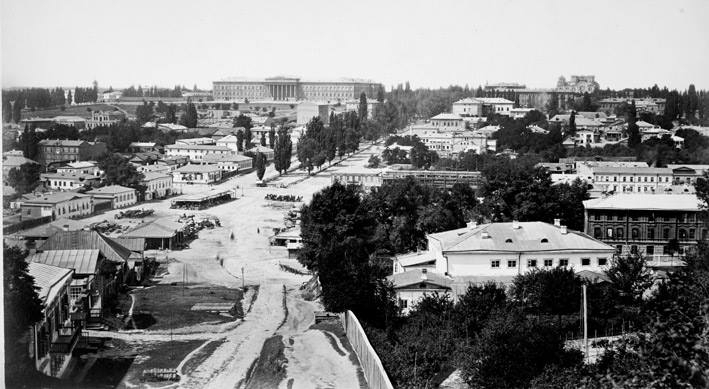
A panorama of Kyiv during the times of Russian rule, with Kyiv University (then known as University of Saint Vladimir seen in the background

On July 15, 1834, the new university was opened by Nicholas I himself. Count Uvarov dubbed it a "mental fortress" that was intended "to smooth over, as much as possible, the sharp characteristics whereby Polish youth is distinguished from the Russian, and particularly to suppress the idea of separate nationality among them, to bring them closer and closer to Russian ideas and customs, to imbue them with the common spirit of the Russian people."

In 1832–1833, the amateur archaeologist Kondratii Lokhvitsky conducted excavations of Kiev's Golden Gate. The excavation was visited by Emperor Nicholas I himself, who gave Lokhvitsky an award and funded his works. The excavations were intended to illustrate the supposed "Russian" history of the city that was predominantly Polish; as historian Serhii Plokhy writes, "Its Russification was literally proceeding from below as ancient ruins, accurately or inaccurately dated to princely times, emerged from beneath the surface."

==== Uniate Church subsumed into the Russian Orthodox Church ====
In the aftermath of the Polish Uprising, the empire once again had to address the question of the Uniate Church, which numbered 1.5 million followers. When the leaders of the Polish nobility in the western provinces issued a call to arms in 1830 it was met with support by many local Ukrainians and Uniate priests. Among those who fully supported in the insurrection were the Basilian monks of the Pochaiv Monastery in Volhynia, whose printing shop published an appeal to the inhabitants of Ukraine urging them to support the Poles. Not only did the monks welcome a Polish military unit to the monastery in April 1831, but eight of them joined the rebels, riding on horses whilst still dressed in their religious garments.

In September 1831, Nicholas I signed a decree dissolving the Uniate monastery in Pochaiv and turning its buildings over to the Russian Orthodox Church. About half to the 95 Uniate monasteries that had existed prior to the Polish Uprising in the 1830s were shut down in the aftermath of the insurrection.

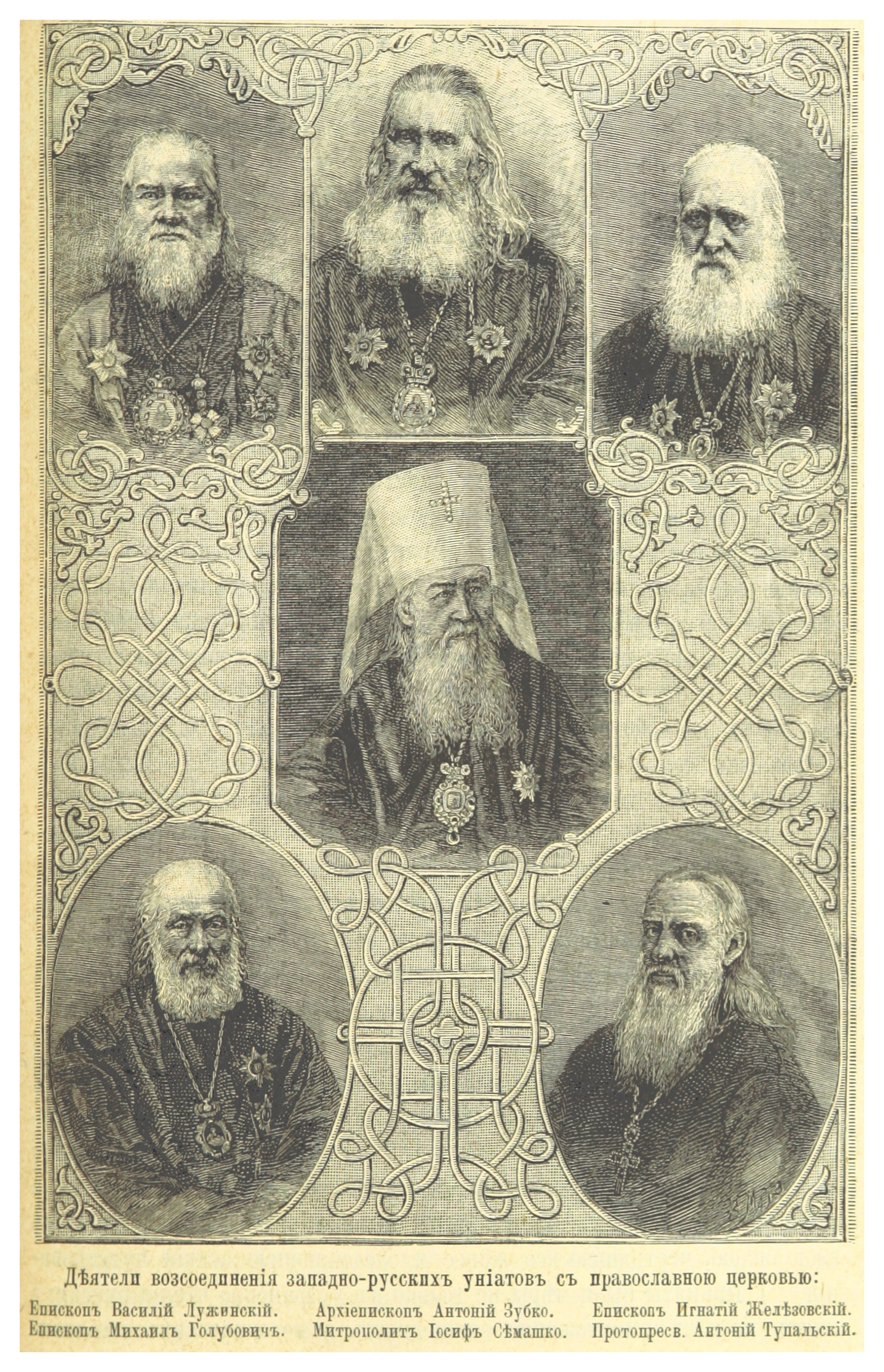
Portrait of Joseph Semashko (middle) and other priests who worked to "reunite" Uniates with the Russian Orthodox Church

Nicholas I accelerated his earlier plans to convert the entire Uniate population to Orthodoxy by devising an institution of unification of Orthodox and Uniate churches. Nicholas found the perfect candidate for the task in Iosif Semashko, a 29 year old whose father had been a Uniate but lost his parish due to his refusal to convert to Orthodoxy. Though Uniate himself, Semashko was impressed by the grandeur of St. Petersburg's Orthodox churches compared to the Uniate churches that lacked support from the state or Catholic landowners. Iosif had been sent to serve as an office of the Spiritual College in St. Petersburg, an institution charged with supervising the activities of the Roman Catholic and Uniate churches in the empire.

In preparation for the unification of the Uniate and Orthodox church Semashko proposed the establishment of a Uniate Spiritual College separate from the Catholic one, as well as the creation of a Uniate seminary to train Uniate priests in an Orthodox spirit.

In 1832, in the aftermath of the November Uprising, Semashko's proposal that the Uniate College be subordinated to the Orthodox Synod was approved by Nicholas I.

Semashko's promotion of the "Orthodoxification" of Uniate parishes went hand in hand with the cultural Russification of the western provinces. He convinced priests to erect an Orthodox-style iconostasis, replace old Uniate service books with Russian ones and grow beards. With the introduction of Russian manner of service, the Russian language was subsequently introduced into spheres where it had been previously not been known or present.

Semashko also conducted a campaign of anti-Polish propaganda among the Uniate priests, trying to turn their Ruthenian (Ukrainian) identity into a Russian one.

Semashko encountered numerous obstacles in his campaign and utilised his only power of appointing Uniate priests to their parishes and removing those whom he considered opponents of his policy, subsequently denying them and their families income. He worked extensively with the civil authorities and the police to crush resistance among the Uniate clergy.

In 1835, Semashko was invited to join a secret government committee charged with bringing about the unification of the Uniate and Orthodox Church. Two years later, Semashko's old idea of subordinating the Uniate church to the Orthodox Synod, which the tsar had approved in 1832, was implemented. With the help of the Orthodox authorities and the backing of the civil administration, Semashko convoked a Uniate Church council to consider the issue. The synod took place in February 1839. With the help of the authorities, Semashko collected 1,305 statements from Unaite priests declaring their willingness to join the Orthodox church; yet, despite pressure of arrests and exile, 593 priests refused to sign the statement.

On 12 February 1839, the synod adopted the Act of Union and issued an appeal to the tsar prepared by Semashko that would result in the closure of 1,600 Uniate parricides and the incorporation of 1.5 million parishioners, many of whom were not consulted into the body of imperial Orthodoxy.

==== Crackdown on Ukrainophiles under Nicholas I ====
Two days before his wedding was scheduled to take place on 30 March 1847, Ukrainophile Mykola Kostomarov was arrested in Kyiv and escorted to St. Petersburg. The order was given by Count Aleksei Orlov, the head of the Third Section of the Imperial Chancellery — the body responsible for political surveillance. The Ukrainian poet Taras Shevchenko was arrested on 5 April 1847 and also escorted to St. Petersburg.

The governor general of Kyiv (Podilia and Volhynia at the time), Dmitrii Bibikov, was then in St. Petersburg reporting on a proclamation found on the wall of a building in Kyiv that read, "Brothers! A great hour is upon us, an in hour in which you are given the opportunity to wash off the dishonour inflicted on the dust of our ancestors on our native Ukraine, by the base hands of our eternal foes. Who among us will not lend a hand to this great undertaking? God and good people are with us! The ever loyal sons of Ukraine, foes of the katsapy (derogatory term for Russians)."

Bibikov was sent back to Kyiv with orders to take over supervision of the Kyiv education district and, at a meeting with students at the university, gave a stern warning against "loose thinking" and threatened, "If I managed to bring 5 million people to heel (the population of right-bank Ukraine), then I will do it to you as well: either I will burst, or all of you will explode."

The Third Section's investigations into the activities of Shevchenko and Kostomarov uncovered the existence of a clandestine organisation known as the Brotherhood of Saints Cyril and Methodius. The goal of the organisation was the creation of a voluntary federation of Slavic nations, with Ukraine at its core. Investigations into the Brotherhood were completed in May 1847, when the chief of the Third Section of the Imperial Chancellery, Count Aleksei Orlov, reported to the tsar, "The uncovering of a Slavic, or more correctly, a Ukrainian-Slavic, society began with a student at Kyiv University, Aleksei Petrov."

Petrov was the impoverished son of a former police official, who shared an apartment in the same building with one of the organisation's members and reported the group.

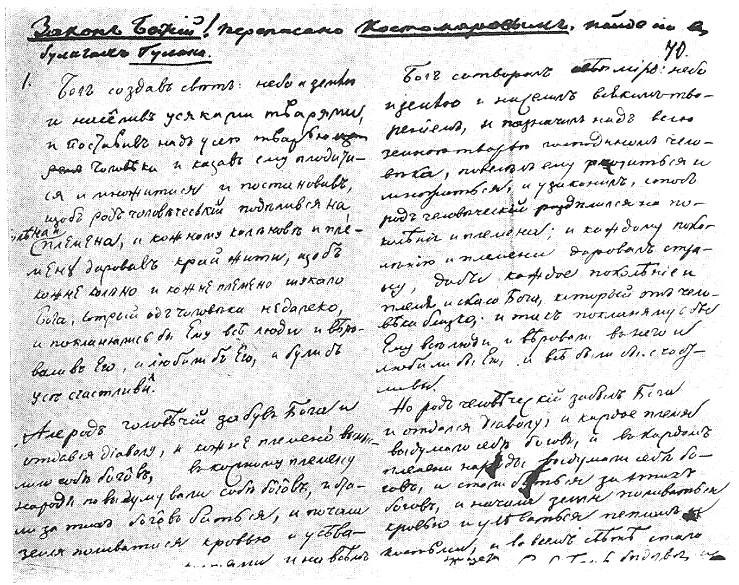
Manuscript of the Books of the Genesis of the Ukrainian People created by Kostomarov and later used in the investigation against the Society of Saint Cyril and Methodius

Historians claim that Orlov either deliberately or accidentally underestimated the threat presented by the brotherhood by reporting to the tsar that "the political evil per se, fortunately, had not managed to develop to the extent suggested by the preliminary reports." The "political evil" that Orlov was referring to was contained in the Books of the Genesis of the Ukrainian People that envisioned the creation of a Slavic confederation based on the principle of popular representation with no place for the tsar. The books characterised the Ukrainians as distinct from both Russians and Poles and saw them as destined to lead the future Slavic federation as, unlike the Russians who were dominated by an autocratic tsar and the Poles who had an overbearing caste of noble landowners, the Ukrainians were a nation that cherished its democratic Cossack traditions.

Orlov recommended punishing the "Ukrainophiles"- a term that he invented to refer to the core members of the Brotherhood — though imprisonment, internal exile and forced military service. Though the authorities did not believe Shevchenko was a member of the society, they were deeply disturbed by his verses that extolled Ukraine and attacked the emperor for exploiting his homeland. Orlov was also concerned about the impact of Shevchenko's glorification of Ukraine's Cossack traditions: "Along with favourite poems, ideas may have been sown and subsequently have taken root in Little Russia about the supposedly happy times of the hetmans, the felicity of restoring those times, and Ukraine's capacity to exist as a separate state."

The authorities publicised the existence of the Brotherhood of Saints Cyril and Methodius as well as the punishment meted out to its members. Kostomarov, the key figure, was imprisoned in the Peter and Paul Fortress in St. Petersburg and exiled in the town of Saratov. Others received sentences of one to three years and internal exile from Ukraine in Russia.

The authorities believed the brotherhood's activities were a part of their wider struggle with the Polish nobility: Nicholas I wrote that "For a long time we did not believe that such work was going on in Ukraine, but now there can be no doubt about it."

A memorandum was prepared by the officers of the Third Section intended to suppress the spread of Ukrainophile ideas, reading "Through the minister of popular education, to warn all those dealing with Slavdom, antiquity, and nationality, as well as professors, teachers, and censors, that in their books and lectures they sedulously avoid any mention of Little Russia, Poland, and other lands subject to Russia that may be understood in a sense dangerous to the integrity and peace of the empire, and on the contrary, they strive as much as possible to incline all lessons of scholarship and history toward the true loyalty of all those tribes to Russia."

In 1854, Uvarov, wrote to the minister of the interior reminding him of an imperial decree suggesting that "writers should be most careful when handling the question of Little Russian ethnicity and language, lest love for Little Russia outweigh affection for the fatherland - the Empire."

=== Alexander II ===
Russia's loss in the Crimean War and the worsening of its international position emboldened Polish society in its demands for previous freedoms. In January 1863 the Polish revolted once again, with the insurrection spreading to the Ukrainian provinces of the empire and taking more than a year to crush. The revolt was followed by repressions of the leaders and participants as well as a new campaign to Russify the provinces annexed during the partitions.

It was during Alexander II's rule that Russia began to take on the character of a tripartite nation of Great, Little, and White Russians.

During the early years of Alexander in the late 1850s, Metropolitan Iosif Semashko, who had managed to bring most of the Uniates in the empire under the jurisdiction of Russian Orthodoxy, noticed a new threat to the imperial regime - the khlopomany. The khlopomany were young Polish noblemen who renounced their Catholic Faith and embraced the Orthodox faith as well as the identity of Ukrainians such as Wlodzimierz Antonowicz who changed his name to Volodymyr Antonovych. Semashko was able to suppress the movement by politicising it.

In 1859, Sylvestry Gogotsky, a professor at Kiev University and key leader of the pan-Russian movement, put forward a formula to prevent the spread of the Ukrainian movement: a) We should immediately take measures to educate the people on both sides of the Dnieper; b) From now on we should support the idea of the unity of the three Russian tribes; without that unity, we shall perish very quickly; c) the Russian literary language should be the same for all in primers. Faith and language should be binding elements"

==== Valuev Circular ====
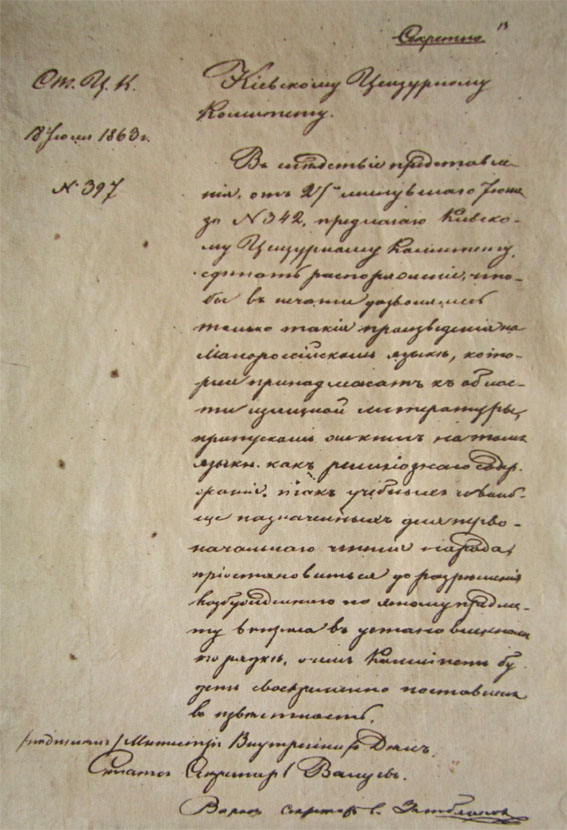
The Valuev Circular, issued by the minister of internal affairs of the Russian Empire, stating that the Ukrainian language "never existed, doesn't exist, and cannot exist."

In 1862, all Ukrainian Sunday schools, numbering over 100 at the time, were abolished and proscribed. In 1863, minister of internal affairs Pyotr Valuyev issued the so-called Valuev Circular. The circular was directed mainly against Ukrainian intellectuals and their efforts to introduce their language into churches and schools. The circular directed the attention of censors to the publication of Ukrainian ranging from writings for a narrow group of intellectual to literature for the masses. Valuev wrote, "there has never been, is not, and cannot be any separate Little Russian language", "the so-called Ukrainian language". The Valuev circular intended to prevent the distribution of Ukrainian language publications among the common people and prohibited the publication of educational and religious texts in Ukrainian.

According to historian Serhii Plokhy, the Valuev Circular "had profound effects on the development of the Ukrainian culture and identity." When the Valuev Circular was first introduced in 1863, thirty-three Ukrainian language publications had appeared in print; by 1868 their number had been reduced to one. The government had effectively arrested the development of the Ukrainian language and high culture.

In 1861, the Ukrainophiles approached Metropolitan Arsenii of Kyiv for help in distributing Shevchenko's primer. After turning to the government for advice, the Censorship Committee recommended that Arsenii turn down the request arguing that publications in Ukrainian could undermine the state.

The event that led to the issuing of the Valuev Circular was a letter sent to the Third Section of the Imperial Chancellory allegedly on behalf of Orthodox clerics demanding a ban on the translation of the Gospels into Ukrainian that was then being reviewed by the Holy Synod. The letter was subsequently forwarded to the governor general of Kyiv, Nikolai Annenkov, who believed that if the uniqueness of the Ukrainian language was acknowledged through the translation, autonomy and potentially independence could be sought. Annenkov reported his opening to Emperor Alexander II, who instructed the head of the Third Section to refer to the heads of government. Thus Alexander II himself considered Annekov's opinion as relevant.

As a result of the Valuev circular the plans to publish the Ukrainian translation of the Gospels, prepared by Ukrainian cultural activist Pylyp Morachevsky, were cancelled and all publications in Ukrainian intended for the popular masses were banned.

The Valuev Circular had been preceded by a media campaign organised by the Third Section, proposed by Nikolai Annenkov.

==== Crackdown on Ukrainophiles under Alexander II ====
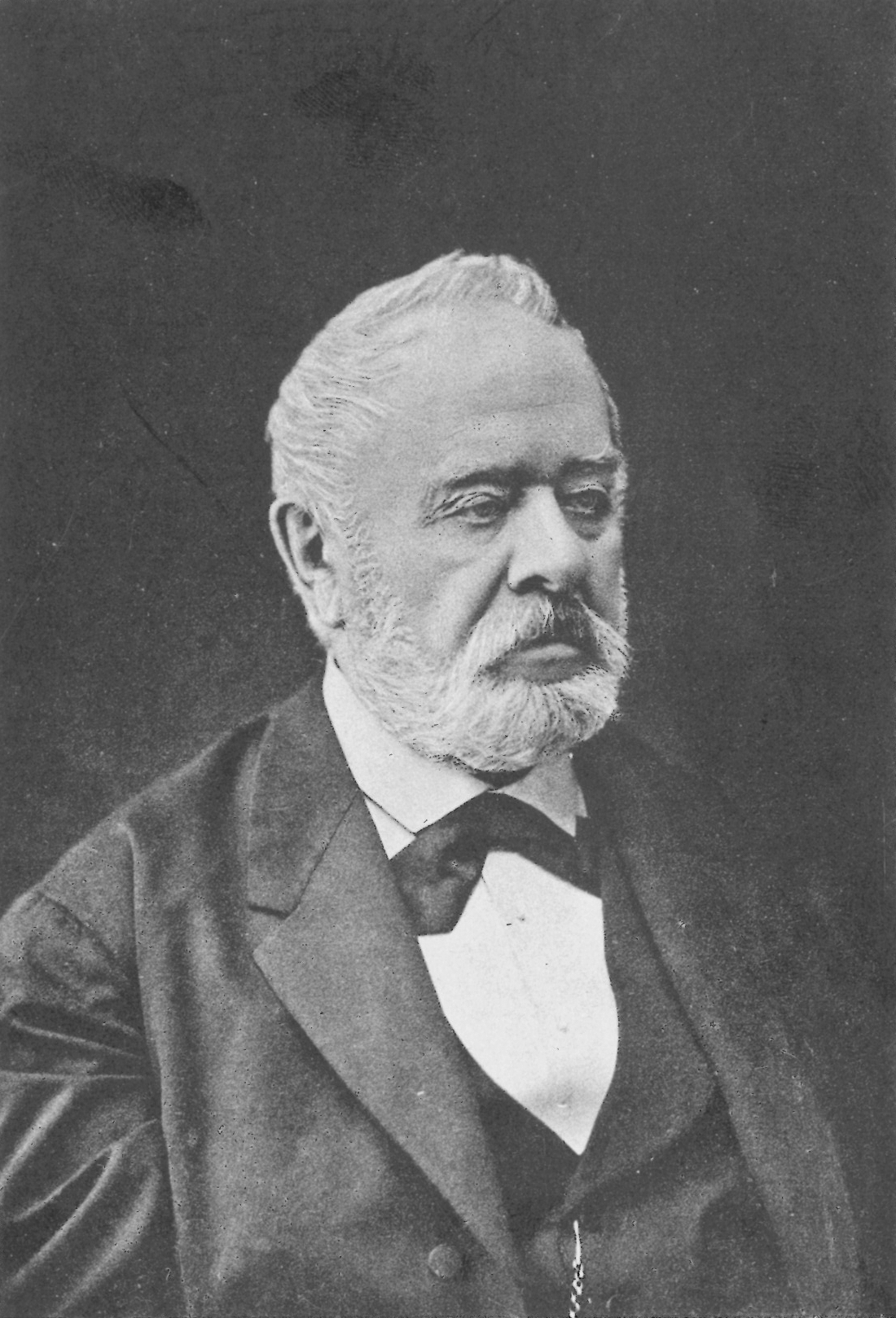
Portrait of Mikhail Iuzefovich, one of the chief initiators of Ems Decree

In May 1875, three months after a scathing article by Nikolai Rigelman, published in Mikhail Katkov's Russian Herald, that attacked Ukrainophilism, the deputy minister of education sent a letter to the head of the Kyiv Educational District, with Rigelman's article attached and asking for the names of Ukrainophile professors. As a result of the letter, the professor of ancient history, Mykhailo Drahomanov was fired.

In August 1875, Alexander II, ordered the creation of a Special Council to examine the publication of Ukrainian literature and the activities of the Ukrainophiles. The council included the head of the Third Section, Aleksandr Potapov, retired military officer Mikhail Yuzefovich, the general curator of the Holy Synod and the minister of the interior and education.

The council's deliberations began in April 1876, the journal of the council's proceedings read: "Also obvious is the ultimate goal toward which the Ukrainophiles are directed: they are now attempting to separate the Little Russians by the gradual but to some extent accurate method of separating Little Russian speech and literature. Allowing the creation of a separate popular literature in the Ukrainian dialect would mean establishing a firm basis for the development of the conviction that the alienation of Ukraine from Russia might be possible in the future".

On May 18, 1876, Alexander II whilst vacationing in Germany, signed a decree prepared by the Special Council known as the Edict of Ems. The edict began with the resolution to "put a stop to the activity of the Ukrainophiles, which is a danger to the state". The prohibitions that had been introduced by the Valuev circular became permanent and new ones were introduced. The edict:

- banned the importation of all Ukrainian-language publications into the empire
- prohibited the publication not only of religious text, grammar, and books in Ukrainian for the common people but also les belle lettres for the upper echelons of society, intended to inhibit the development of Ukrainian literature on all levels
- existing Ukrainian-language publications were to be removed from school libraries
- prohibited theatrical performances, songs and poetry readings in Ukrainian

Alexander II also ordered repressive measures against Ukrainophile activists. Mykhailo Drahomanov and Pavlo Chubynsky were both exiled from Ukraine, the Kyiv Branch of the Imperial Geographic Society (the centre of intellectual activity in Kyiv as well as an epicentre of Ukrainophilism) was liquidated, the Kievsky Telegraf newspaper was closed, the heads of the Kyiv, Kharkiv and Odesa educational districts were ordered to watch for suspect Ukrainophiles and report them. Teaching positions in Ukraine were to be filled exclusively by Russians, whilst Ukrainian teachers were sent to teach in Russia.

The introduction of Valuyev Circular and Ems Decree seriously hindered the development of Ukrainian literature in the decades until the Russian Revolution of 1905.

==== Moscophilia and Russophilia in the Austrian Empire ====
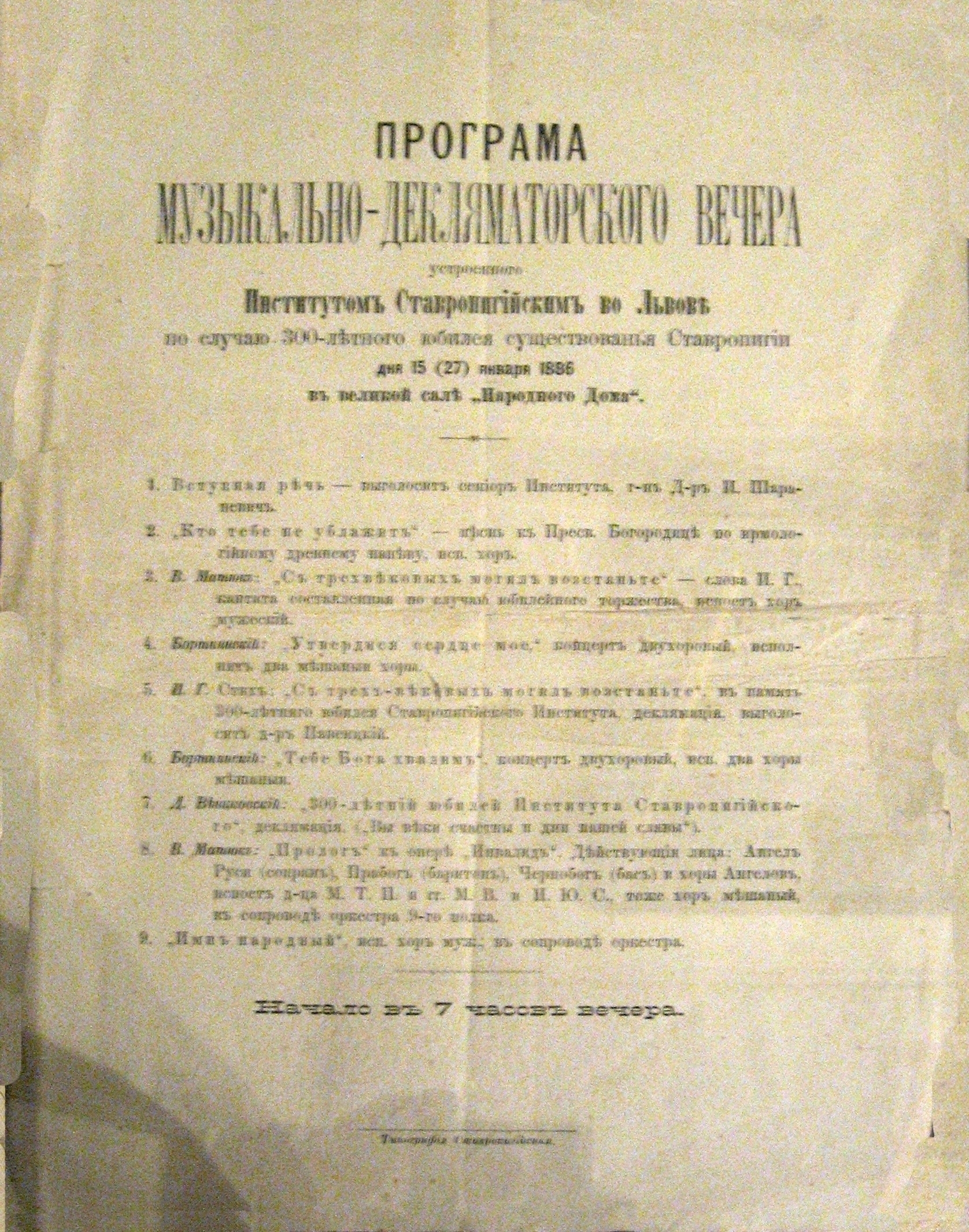
An 1886 program of cultural events printed in yazychiye by the Stauropegion Institute, one of the chief organs of Galician Russophiles

A section of the Edict of Ems discussed the newspaper Slovo, published in the then capital of Austrian Galicia - Lviv. According to the edict Russia was "to support the newspaper, Slovo, which is being published in Galicia with an orientation hostile to that of the Ukrainophiles, by providing it at least with a constant subsidy, however small, without which it could not continue to exist and would have to cease publications". The subsidy amounted to 2,000 gulden and was approved personally by Alexander II. Following Austria's Seven Weeks War with Prussia, the kingdom was transformed into a dual monarchy and the appointment of a Polish governor to rule Galicia was regarded by the Ruthenian elite as a betrayal. The Slovo newspaper promoted Russophilia and a turn away from the west. After the Seven Weeks War, the Russian ambassador to Austria, Ernst Shtakelberg, advised the foreign minister against partitioning Austria or for a media campaign in defence of the Ruthenians arguing they would drop in their hands thanks to Austria's toleration of Polonism.

The movement was not received well, and many Russophile figures immigrated to the Russian Empire where they were welcomed. The government, however, preferred to keep them from the turbulent right-bank Ukraine and directed them to the northern Kholm Region where the last group of Greek Catholics in the Russian Empire remained. Russophile priests and seminarians who had been born Greek Catholic, but as part of their ideology as well as the larger salary, converted to Orthodoxy, settled amongst the remaining Uniates propagating imperial-Russian identity and forcing them to convert. In 1881, 143 of the 291 Orthodox priests in the area were former Greek Catholics who had converted due to the significantly higher salary than they had been receiving in Galicia, as well as other motives.

=== Alexander III ===
Alexander III of Russia followed his father's testament and continued oppressive anti-Ukrainian policies. His government limited the power of local authorities, reducing the autonomy of courts, city councils and zemstvos. The Ems Decree, although modified in 1881 in order to allow theatrical performances in Ukrainian language, would remain valid until 1905. The emergence of Ukrainian professional theatre under Marko Kropyvnytsky, which followed the partial relaxation of the language ban, soon caused a new wave of repression by authorities. In 1883 Alexander Drenteln, the Governor-General of Kyiv, banned Ukrainian plays in the region, and in 1884 Alexander III himself issued a decree prohibiting theatrical performances in Ukrainian in all "Little Russian" governorates. In the sphere of publishing, the printing of Ukrainian dictionaries was allowed, but original works of literature could only be printed in Russian orthography. In 1888 imperial authorities introduced a ban on the use of Ukrainian language in government institutions, and outlawed the baptism of children under Ukrainian names.

=== Nicholas II ===
==== Ukrainians in the Duma ====
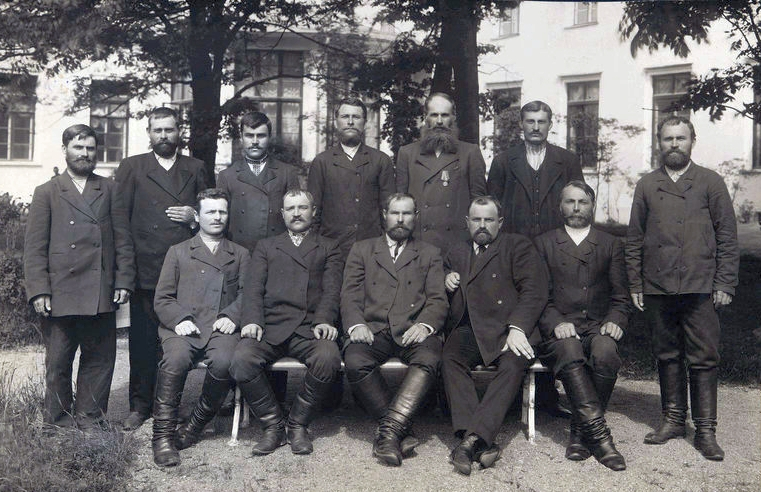
Ethnic Ukrainian members of the 1st Duma representing Podolia Governorate

After Bloody Sunday of 1905 and the revolutionary upheaval that followed, Nicholas II issued an edict stating that his subjects could now freely choose their religion and more importantly leave the Russian Orthodox Church if they wished without any political repercussions. In response between 100,000 and 150,000 Ukrainians reverted to Uniatism in the Kholm region. Regional officials and Orthodox clergy who had devoted their lives to teaching these people they were both Orthodox and Russian felt betrayed, including the Orthodox bishop of Kholm Evlogii (Georgievsky), who wrote in a letter to the Holy Synod: "The very credit of our priests has been undermined. For thirty years they repeated to the people that the Kholm Podliashie country will always be Orthodox and Russian, and now the people see, on the contrary, the complete, wilful takeover of the enemies of the Orthodox Russian cause in that country". The general proctor of the Holy Synod was Konstantin Pobedonostsev who was one on the architects of the policy of Russification in the western provinces.

In the 1906 elections to the First Duma, the Ukrainian provinces of the empire elected sixty two deputies, with forty four of them joining the Ukrainian parliamentary club that aimed to promote the Ukrainian political and cultural agenda in the capital. Russian nationalist Mikhail Menshikov was infuriated by the example set by the Ukrainians, he wrote "the Belarusians, took, are following the khokhly in speaking of a 'circle' of their own in the State Duma. There are Belarusian separatists as well, you see. It's enough to make a cat laugh". Unlike the Ukrainians and Polish, the Belarusians were unable to form a club or circle.

Mykhailo Hrushevsky prepared a parliamentary resolution on Ukrainian autonomy, yet he was unable to present the document as the imperial authorities dissolved the First Duma on 8 July 1906, only seventy two days after it was opened. The tsar was angered by the actions of the non-Russian deputies, his manifesto on the dissolution read: "the representatives of the nation, instead of applying themselves to the work of productive legislation, have strayed into spheres beyond their competence and have been making inquiries into the acts of local authorities established by ourselves, and have been making comments on the imperfections of the fundamental laws, which can only be modified by our imperial will".

The Ukrainian deputies were again able to attempt to promote Ukrainian autonomy in the brief Second Duma. However, the dissolution of the Second Duma was followed by a change in electoral legislation, favouring large landowners and inhibiting and preventing the election of Ukrainophile deputies. Neither in the Third or Fourth Duma was there a Ukrainian caucus. Hence, in 1908 a Duma majority rejected proposal to introduce the Ukrainian language into the school system and again rejected in 1909 its use in the courts. In February 1914 the government prohibited the celebration in Kyiv of the centenary of Taras Shevchenko's birth.

==== Union of the Russian People ====
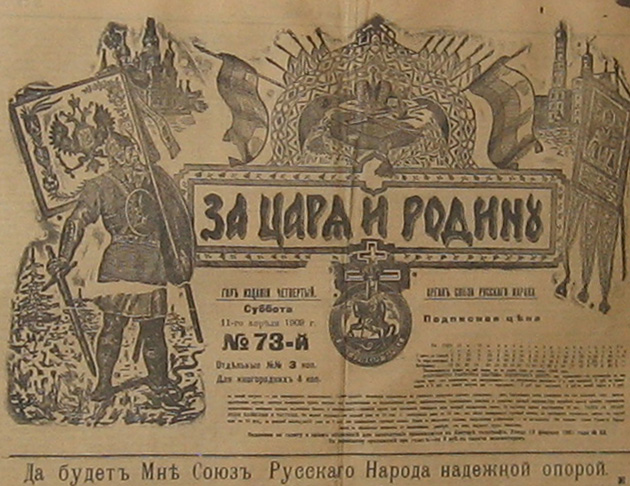
A 1909 publication of the Odessa branch of the Union of the Russian People

In order to prevent the Polish nobility and small Ukrainian landowners from monopolising the votes to the Duma in the western provinces, Russian nationalists established the Union of the Russian People in 1905. It was received warmly by Nicholas II in December 1905 and played a key role in mobilising support for the monarchy under the banner of nationalism. According to the Union's statue "the good of the motherland lies in the firm preservation of Orthodoxy, unlimited Russian autocracy, and the national way of life" and "The union makes no distinction between Great Russians, White Russians and Little Russians".

Right Bank Ukraine in particular became the Union's main base of operations, with its largest branch in the Ukrainian region of Volhynia centred on the Pochaiv Monastery. What accounted for the impressive number of Union members in the western provinces was that, as in Volhynia, local chapters were led and coordinated by priests who enlisted their parishioners through coercion in the Union. A local police report described it: "The members are local Orthodox parishioners, as well as semiliterate and even illiterate people in the villages, who show no initiative themselves. The heads of the Union's local branches install patriotic feelings in the population by conversing with the peasants and preaching to them in order to strengthen Russia's foundations".

The Union was not only able to accrue so many members through the transition of religious loyalty into loyalty for the empire and the coercive adoption of an all-Russian identity onto the Ukrainian peasantry but was also rooted in the economic demands of the region. In Volhynia and Podolia the average landholding was 9 acres whilst in Southern Ukraine it was 40 acres. The union's propagandists were there to point to the main "culprits" of the peasants troubles: Polish landowners and Jewish middlemen whom they sold their produce to. The locals felt that the Union would promote their economic interests and thus sacrificed their identity.

==== Ukrainian movement during Nicholas II's reign ====
In 1907, those opposing the recognition of Ukrainian as a distinct language published a number of brochures, written by the philologist Timofei Florinsky and Anton Budilovich, though in April 1905 the Imperial Academy of Sciences had already practically accepted the Ukrainian language as separate.

Metropolitan Russian nationalist clubs referred to participants in the Ukrainian moment as "Mazepists", a particularly political slander. In 1909 the empire had lavishly celebrated the bicentennial of Peter I's victory at Poltava. Ironically, most Ukrainian political leaders of the time as well as some Polish politicians such as Roman Dmowski sought autonomy with a federated Russian Empire.

Despite the Revolution of 1905, many limitations directed against the Ukrainian language and literature remained in force. Although the Ems Decree had de-facto become invalid, it was never formally abolished due to opposition from the imperial government. In 1910 the cabinet of Pyotr Stolypin outlawed Ukrainian publishing houses and prohibited reading of lectures in Ukrainian language. Russian nationalists portrayed the Ukrainian movement as a major threat for the Russian nation and state and also pointed to its weakness: that it was limited to students and intellectuals, with little following among the popular masses, especially among the peasantry. In 1905 Ukrainian activists made progress in the countryside, opening Prosvita cultural societies, conducted a campaign amongst the peasantry and launched a Ukrainian-language newspaper. But with the end of the active phase of the First Russian Revolution (1905-1907), Ukrainian influence in the countryside was severely curbed by the government, whilst Russian nationalism swept the rural areas.

Nevertheless, the influence of Russification on the country was limited, as ethnic Russians and Russified members of the upper classes concentrated in cities and industrial areas. Ukrainian language continued to dominate among peasants, who comprised 95% of Ukraine's population under Russian rule, with church services and school education having little influence on culture of the common folk. A bigger role in the promotion of Russification was played by the army service.

==== World War I ====
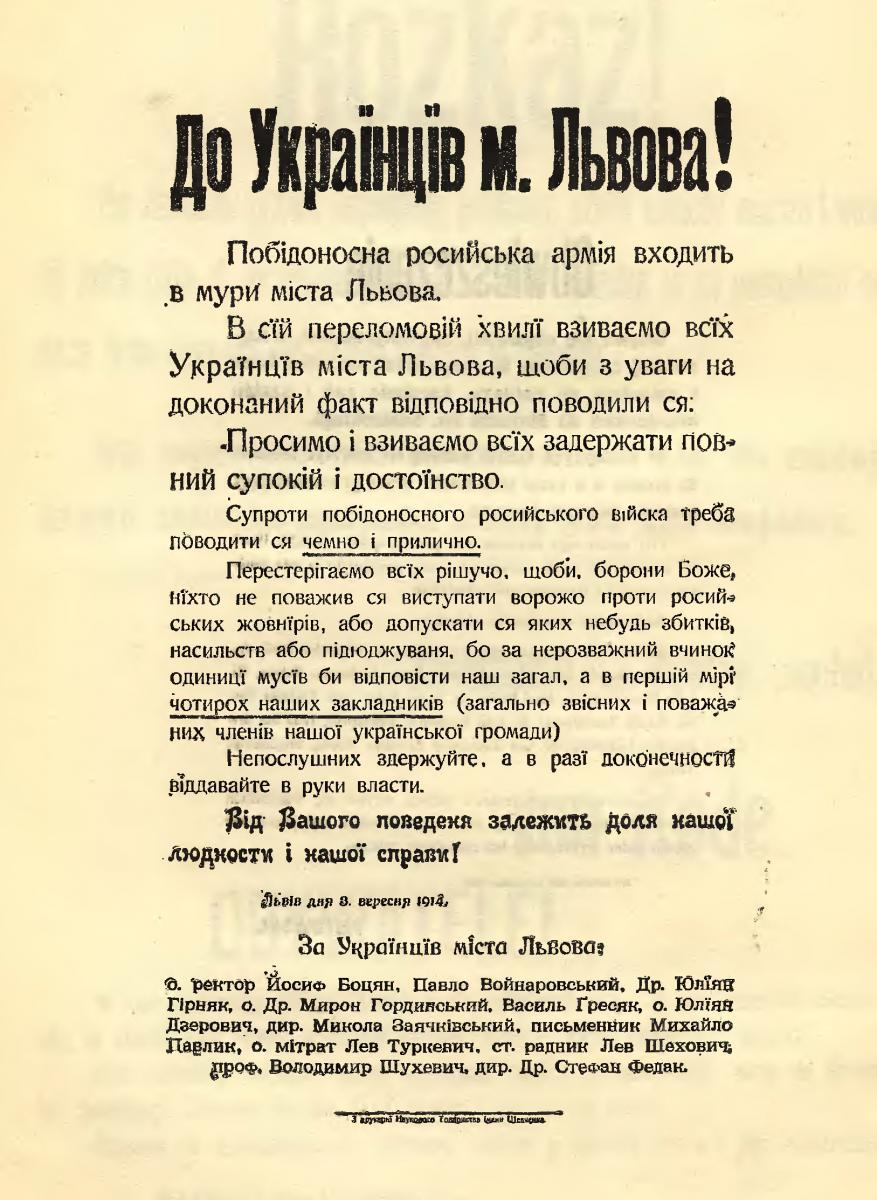
An appeal to Lviv's Ukrainian residents on the eve of the entry of Russian troops into the city during the First World War

Following a decree banning the Ukrainian press, which was issued in 1914 by Nicholas II, all publishing in Ukrainian in the Russian Empire was fully forbidden. On 18 August 1914, Russian forces crossed the border into Austria. The war on the southern sector of the front was supposed to solve the "Russian question" once and for all, uniting all "Russians" under the emperor. The invasion of Austria by Russia offered a unique opportunity to crush Ukrainian movements in the Austro-Hungarian Empire by bringing the territories of their activity into the Russian Empire.

In the fall of 1914, the region of Galicia was placed under the administrative rule of the ethnic Russian Count Georgii Bobrinsky, who saw Russification as his main task. During his inauguration into office he declared: "I shall establish the Russian language law and system here". His ally in this new campaign of Russification was his nephew and member of the Duma Vladimir Bobrinsky, who had headed the Galician Benevolent Society which supported the Russophile movement in Volhynia and lobbied the Russian government to do the same. Bishop Evlogii of Kholm was placed in charge of the Orthodox mission in Galicia and the three had a rare opportunity to implement their ideas for Russification.

The name of the city of Lemberg was swiftly changed to the Russian Lvov, the names of streets and squares in Galicia and Bukovina were changed to popularise Russian cultural and political figures such as Aleksandr Pushkin. The Russian language was introduced into the education system with the aim of replacing Ukrainian, special courses were introduced for local teachers to master the Russian language. Ukrainian newspapers were closed and books published outside the Russian Empire in the Ukrainian language were prohibited and confiscated, which de-facto put an end to Ukrainian publishing in Galicia and Bukovina, as those regions were located "outside of the empire" in their entirety. Even Ukrainian language correspondence was banned. Ukrainophile organisations were closed and their activity arrested. The head of the Ukrainian Greek-Catholic Church, Metropolitan Andrei Sheptytsky was arrested and sent to Central Russia, where he spent the next years in exile in an Orthodox monastery. The library of the Shevchenko Scientific Society was destroyed.

Juxtaposed to the fate of the dominant Ukrainophile organisations, Russophile leaders and organisations were supported and funded. The nephew of the governor of Galicia, Vladimir Bobrinsky personally travelled to prisons in the newly occupied regions to release Russophile activists imprisoned by the Austrian authorities who helped him propagandise in support of the "White Tsar".

In order to help promote stability behind the front lines and prevent loss of territory, the head of military command Grand Duke Nikolai Nikolaevich ordered that limits be imposed on the Orthodox mission in the region allowing Archbishop Evlogii of Kholm to take over Greek Catholic parishes only if they lacked a Greek Catholic priest (the majority had fled the region or been arrested by the Austrians). This was an unprecedented shift in comparison to the alleged 30,000 converts to Orthodoxy in the first weeks of the occupation.

Pavel Miliukov, the head of the Constitutional Democratic Party, disagreed with his party comrade Petr Struve who believed that the clampdown on the Ukrainian movement in Galicia was the end of the movement, suggesting that he educate himself by reading the literature published by its members. Miliukov did not believe that the Ukrainian cooperative movement could be terminated by military occupation. He drafted and presented a resolution to the Central Committee of his party demanding "an end to the anti-state system of Russifying occupied territory, the reestablishment of closed national institutions, and strict observance of the personal and property rights of the population".

Ukrainian nationalists in the Russian Empire were unable to help their compatriots in Galicia and Bukovina, as they too were on the defence doing their best to prove their loyalty to the empire. Long before the war had yet to begin, the Russian nationalists in Kiev and other cities of the Empire warned about the possibility of Ukraine leaving Russia and joining Austria-Hungary. With the start of the war, the authorities acting on the concerns and paranoia of the Russian nationalist camp closed down Ukrainian language publications such as the Kiev-based newspaper Rada, harassed Ukrainian organisations and activists and branded them "Mazepists".

Mykhailo Hrushevsky was arrested upon his arrival to Kiev in November 1914 by the Russian police on charges of pro-Austrian sympathies. The "proof" of his alleged guilty had been supposedly found in his luggage, which included a Ukrainian brochure entitled "How the Tsar Deceives the People". Yet this was a mere formality, the order for his arrests had been issued soon after the Russian seizure of Lviv where photos of Hrushevsky together with Ukrainian activists had been found. Police officials considered Hrushevsky to be the leader of the Galician "Mazepsits" and planned his exile to Siberia, however, with the intervention of Russian liberal intelligentsia he was exiled to the town of Simbirsk.

Nicholas II had visited Galicia in 1915, with the event being filmed by a Russian crew and becoming a subject of paintings and postcards as a symbolic high point in the long campaign of Muscovite Tsars beginning with Ivan III to gather the lands of the former Kievan Rus and construct a big Russian nation. However the hopes of the Russian "unifiers" were crushed more quickly than they had been fulfilled, and barely a month after the tsars triumphal entrance to Lviv, the Austrians reentered. In the summer of 1915, the Russian nationalists in the Duma joined forces with the Constitutional Democrats in the Union of October 17 that demanded a government responsible to the people.

=== Revolutionary Era and Ukrainian War of Independence ===
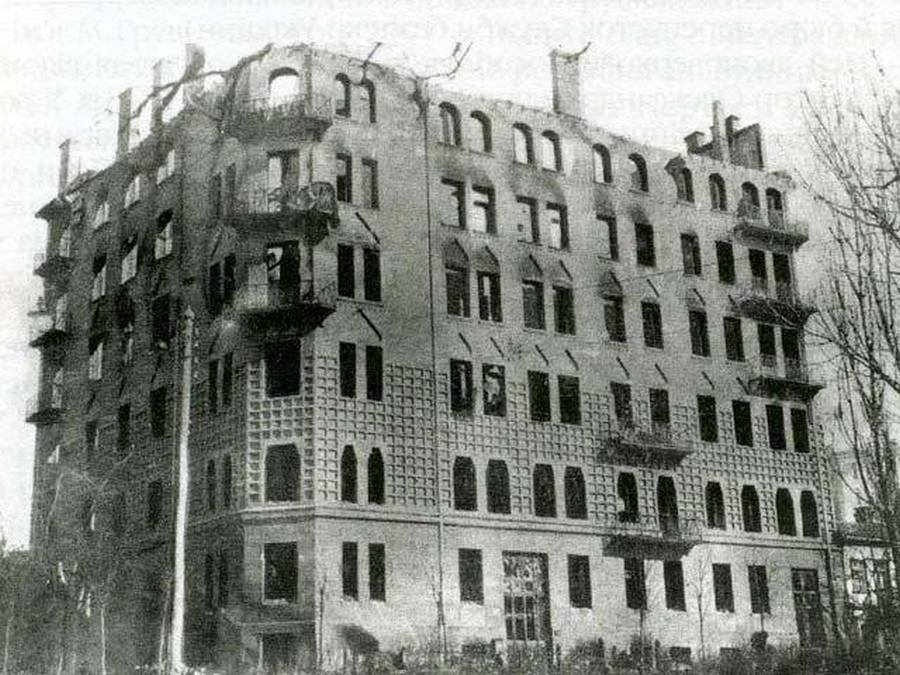
Ruins of Hrushevskyi's building after the shelling of Kyiv by Russian Bolsheviks in 1918

In reaction to the Bolshevik seizure of power on 7 November 1917 (NS), after already declaring autonomy, the Ukrainian People's Republic declared full independence, claiming the provinces of central Ukraine as well as the traditionally Ukrainian settled territories of Kharkiv, Odesa and the Donets River Basin, more importantly, however, the Central Rada refused to cooperate with the new government in Petrograd. Whilst Lenin had seen the Rada as a potential ally in his assault on the Provisional Government and had gone out of his way to recognise the Ukrainian nation as distinct in June 1917, his position drastically changed after the Bolshevik seizure of power. The Bolsheviks in Kiev tried to repeat the same formula they had used in Petrograd to seize control, trying to gain a majority in the Congress of Soviets, yet they found themselves in the minority in Kiev. The Bolsheviks moved to Kharkiv, an industrial centre closer to the border with Russia and declared the creation of the Ukrainian Soviet Socialist Republic. The Central Rada refused to recognise or acknowledge the Ukrainian Soviet Socialist Republic which it perceived as a "Bolshevik clone".

In the "Manifesto to the Ukrainian People with an Ultimatum to the Central Rada", drafted by Lenin, Trotsky and Stalin, the Bolshevik leaders made the paradoxical statement simultaneously recognising the right of the Ukrainian people to self-determination and denying it in the name of the revolution. Lacking strength in Ukraine, Lenin sent Russian military units to Kiev led by the former security chief of the Provisional Government, Mikhail Muraviev. In January 1918, Muraviev's troops began their advance on Kyiv and in early February seized the capital of the Ukrainian People's Republic after firing 15,000 artillery units on the city. Muraviev's gunners targeted the house of Mikhailo Hrushevsky, bombarding it and setting it afire, causing the death of his family.

After seizing the city, Muraviev's troops shot people on the streets of Kiev for using the Ukrainian language, which Muraviev's troops considering evidence of nationalist counterrevolution. In February 1918, Volodymyr Zatonsky was arrested on the streets of Kiev for speaking and corresponding in Ukrainian, but was saved from execution by a paper signed by Lenin found in his pocket.

After his entrance into Kiev, Muraviev demanded 5 million rubles to apply his army and ordered his troops "mercilessly to destroy all officers and cadets, haidamakas, monarchists, and enemies of the revolution in Kiev". Close to 5,000 people suspected of allegiance to the old Regime or the Central Rada were executed during this time.

In January 1919, the White Army formed in the Don region began its advance on Ukraine led by General Anton Denikin. Denikin was a strong proponent of an indivisible Russia who hated the Bolsheviks and who considered the Ukrainian movement a threat, whether based in Ukraine or in his own periphery, in the Kuban, originally settled by Ukrainian Cossacks who now wished to unite with Ukraine. In the summer of 1918, Denikin sent his troops to the Kuban region to prevent a possible seizure of power by the Bolsheviks or Skoropadsky regime, and in the fall of 1918 Denikin dissolved the pro-Ukrainian Kuban Cossack Rada that had been initiating plans to unite with Ukraine and executed its pro-Ukrainian leaders.

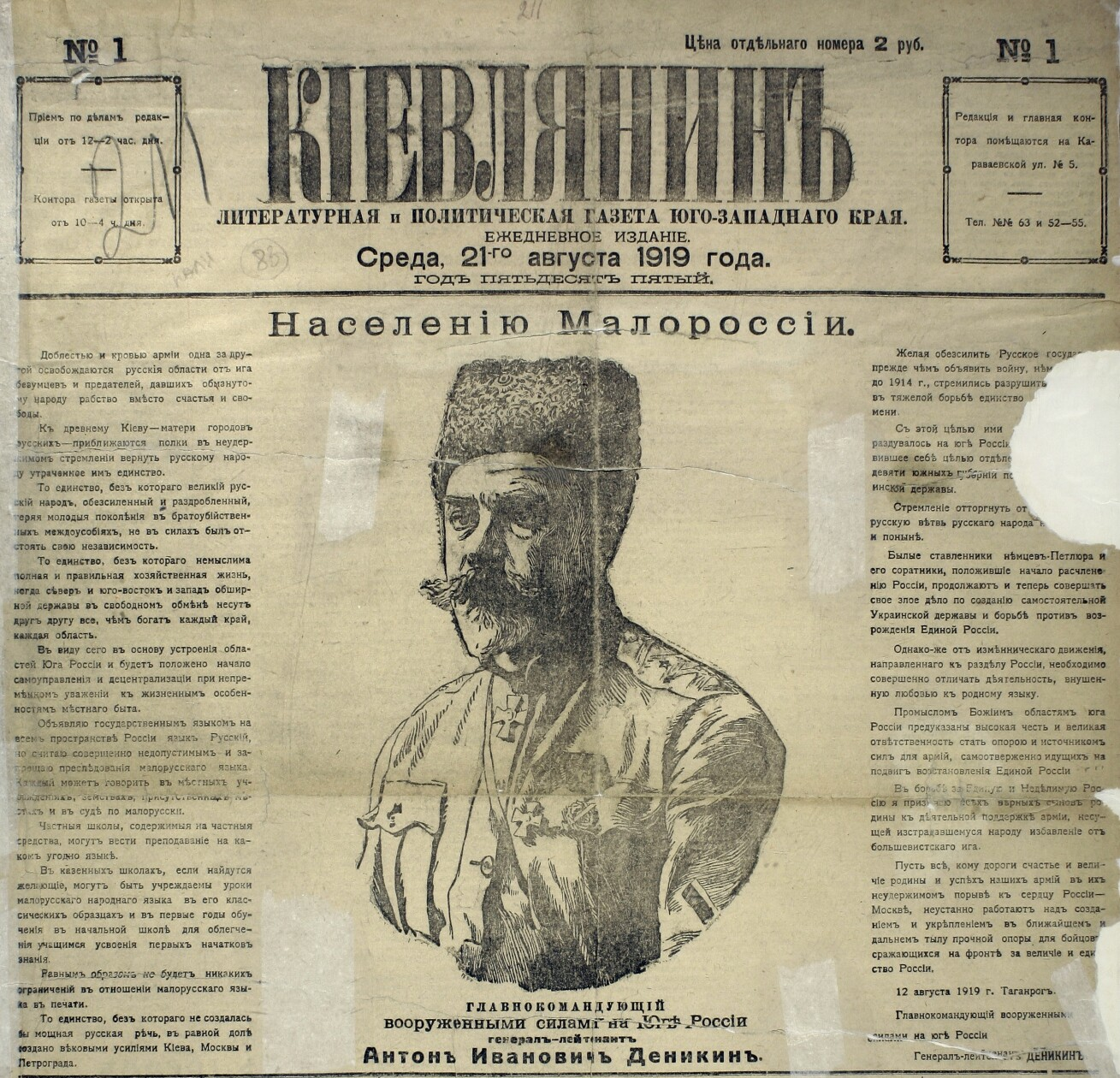
Denikin's appeal "To the Inhabitants of Little Russia", published in the newspaper Kievlyanin

When Denikin captured Kiev in August 1919, staunch Russian nationalist Vasili Shulgin was given the opportunity to apply his solution to the Ukrainian question onto the rest of Ukraine. Shulgin was the principal drafter of Denikin's appeal "To the Inhabitants of Little Russia" publicised on the eve of Denikin's entrance into Kiev. The appeal proclaimed that Russian was the language of state institutions and the educational system. This official policy formulated by Shulgin and Denikin was a major blow for the Ukrainian cultural movement after its positive treatment by the Central Rada and the Skoropadsky regime. In Kiev and other cities under its control, Denikin's army busied themselves by closing Ukrainian language newspapers, schools and institutions. All Ukrainian language signs were replaced with Russian language ones and owners of the buildings who resisted the changes were threatened.

As Ukrainian complaints about their treatment and the violation of their civil liberties and cultural rights reached the west, who backed Denikin and his anti-Bolshevik campaign, the Western powers tried to restrain the "anti-Ukrainian zeal of Volunteer Army Commanders".

== Soviet period ==
The introduction of Soviet rule over Ukraine in 1919-1920 renewed the domination of Russian language and ethnic Russians in the country after a short period of Ukrainian revival following the revolution of 1917. During 1919-1923 Russian was the language of documents used by party and state institutions, and dominated in the official press, books and other publications. The situation changed after the 12th Congress of the Russian Communist Party (Bolsheviks), which introduced the policy of Korenization ("indigenisation"). While it was meant to bolster the power of the Party in local cadres, the policy was at odds with the concept of a Soviet people with a shared Russian heritage. Under Stalin, "korenization" took second stage to the idea of a united Soviet Union, where competing national cultures were no longer tolerated, and the Russian language increasingly became the only official language of Soviet socialism.

The times of restructuring of farming and the introduction of industrialization brought about a wide campaign against "nationalist deviation," which in Ukraine translated into the end of "korenization" policy and an assault on the political and cultural elite. The first wave of purges between 1929 and 1934 targeted the revolutionary generation of the party that in Ukraine included many supporters of Ukrainization. Soviet authorities specifically targeted the commissar of education in Ukraine, Mykola Skrypnyk, for promoting Ukrainian language reforms that were seen as dangerous and counterrevolutionary; Skrypnyk committed suicide in 1933. The next 1936–1938 wave of political purges eliminated much of the new political generation that replaced those who perished in the first wave. The purges nearly halved the membership of the Ukrainian communist party, and purged Ukrainian political leadership was largely replaced by the cadres sent from Russia that was also largely "rotated" by Stalin's purges.

Russification of Soviet-occupied Ukraine intensified in 1938 under Nikita Khrushchev, then secretary of the Ukrainian Communist Party, but was briefly halted during World War II, when Axis forces occupied large areas of the country. After the war ended, Western Ukraine was reabsorbed into the Soviet Union, and most prominent Ukrainian intellectuals living there were purged or exiled to Siberia. Leonid Brezhnev continued the Russification policies of Khrushchev in postwar Ukraine.

In the 1960s, the Ukrainian language began to be used more widely and frequently in spite of these policies. In response, Soviet authorities increased their focus on early education in Russian. After 1980, Russian language classes were instituted from the first grade onward. In 1990 Russian became legally the official all-Union language of the Soviet Union, with constituent republics having rights to declare their own official languages.

=== Vladimir Lenin ===
On 30 December 1922, the day the delegates voted to create the Soviet Union, Lenin began to dictate his last work on the nationality question entitled "On the Questions of Nationalities or 'Autonomization", it contained an attack on Stalin's policies on the subject and criticised the rights provided to the republics by the Union treaty as inadequate to prevent the rise of Russian nationalism.

Lenin's thinking on the Union was rooted in his ideas on the dominant and oppressed nationalities that he formulated in the First World War era. Lenin's nationality policies and attitudes toward Ukrainian independence before October 1917 were designed to facilitate the downfall of the Provisional Government, his attitudes towards Ukrainian independence changed drastically upon the Bolshevik coup and the Ukrainian People's Republic's refusal to cooperate with the new power in Petrograd. In the summer of 1917 Lenin had raised his voice in support of the Central Rada against what he described as the great power chauvinism of the Provisional government, however in December, with the Bolsheviks in power, Lenin dismissed the Central Rada's proclamation of its right to self-determination accusing of it bourgeoisie policies.

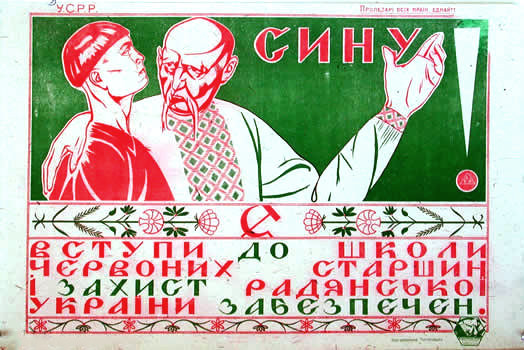
A 1921 Ukrainian-language poster promoting the recruitment of youth by the Red Army

Responding to developments in Ukraine in 1919, the year in which the Bolsheviks had been driven from Ukraine by Anton Denikin and Ukrainian forces and which the Bolsheviks referred to as "the cruel lessons of 1919", Lenin re-formulated the Bolshevik nationality policy. When the Bolsheviks returned to Ukraine at the end of 1919, they had to change their nationality policies to keep Ukraine under control, the facade of an independent Soviet Ukraine was brought back, yet many believed more needed to be done to pacify the restive Ukrainian countryside. The Bolsheviks had support among the Russian and Russified proletariat of the big cities but few Ukrainian speakers backed them. The Bolsheviks wanted the majority Ukrainian speakers to fight under their banner and found that they cared about Ukraine and wanted to be addressed in Ukrainian. However, this caused significant problems as few Bolshevik comissars could speak the language. The Bolshevik party in Ukraine was mainly Russian or Jewish with Russified Ukrainians constituting only a quarter of the party membership.

Lenin was willing to make concessions on language and culture but opposed Ukrainian independence. In his "Letter to the Workers and Peasants of Ukraine on the Occasion of the Victories over Denikin" published in January 1920, Lenin did not attempt to conceal the fact that independence for Ukraine was not his preference and that he supported the "voluntary union of the people".

Yet, Lenin avoided quarrelling over the issue of Ukrainian independence with his new allies in Ukraine, the Socialist Borot'ba faction who demanded full independence for Ukraine. However, once Denikin had been defeated, Lenin used the first available opportunity to crush the pro-independence movement. In February 1920 Lenin drafted a Central Committee resolution preparing the liquidation of the Borotbist faction, now branded as a nationalist organisation. The resolution declared, "their struggle against the slogans of closer and closer union with the RSFSR (Russian Soviet Federative Socialist Republic) is also contrary to the interests of the proletariat. All policy must be directed systematically and unwaveringly toward the fortchoming liquidation of the Borotbists in the near future".

Behind the image of an independent Ukrainian republic was the highly centralised Bolshevik party, whose members took orders directly from Moscow. As historian Serhii Plokhy wrote, "Although the republican communist parties had central committees of their own, they had little more say in matters of general party policy than regional organisations in the Russian provinces".

Beginning in August 1920, Stalin had wanted Ukraine and Transcaucasia (federation of Armenia, Azerbaijan and Georgia) to join the Russian federation as autonomous republics like Bashkiria and to be fully subordinated to the Russian government in Moscow. Stalin had to abandon his plans because of protests from the prospective republics and Lenin who insisted on the creation of a federal union of equal independent republics. Stalin was enforcing his control over rebellious Ukrainians and Georgians not only through party resolutions but through violence, during the debate Stalin's ally Sergo Ordzhonikidize beat up a Georgian socialist who opposed Stalin's union treaty.

Lenin believed that the major threat to the future of the Soviet Union was not local nationalism but rather "Great Russian nationalism". In response to the beating of a Georgian communist by Ordzhonikidze, Lenin wrote "The Georgian who takes a careless attitude toward that aspect of the matter, who carelessly throws around accusations of 'social nationism' when he himself is not only a true-blue 'social nationalist' but a crude Great Russian bully, that Georgian is in fact harming the interests of proletarian class solidarity".

=== Joseph Stalin ===
==== Stalin takes power ====
At the 12th Party Congress in April 1923, Joseph Stalin successfully crushed the opposition mounted by the Ukrainians and Georgians. Christian Rakovsky, the head of the Ukrainian government, made reference to Lenin's notes on the nationality question and advocated handing some of the central government's powers to the republics. Stalin was not impressed and replied that placing "the Great Russian proletariat in a position of inferiority with the formerly oppressed nations is an absurdity". Rakovsky would soon be removed from Ukraine and sent into honorary exile.

The use of the Ukrainian language as the language of administration encountered major obstacles in the early 1920s as party membership in Ukraine in 1924 was: 45% Russian, 33% Ukrainian, and 14% Jewish. The second secretary of the Ukrainian Central Committee, Dmitry Lebed, promoted the Russian language and culture as the attributes of the city and falsely promoted the Ukrainian language as attributes of the countryside. Lebed argued that the Communists had to be on the side of the proletariat, not of the petty bourgeois and peasantry. Lebed was forced to abandon his public propaganda before the 12th Party Congress but his views had spread in the party leadership.

On 27 July 1923 the Council of People's Commissars of the Ukrainian Socialist Soviet Republic adopted a decree on Ukrainization of schools and cultural-educational establishments, which was soon expanded to include state bureaucracy. However, that policy met opposition from ethnic Russians and Russified elements, and with time the process of Ukrainization slowed down.

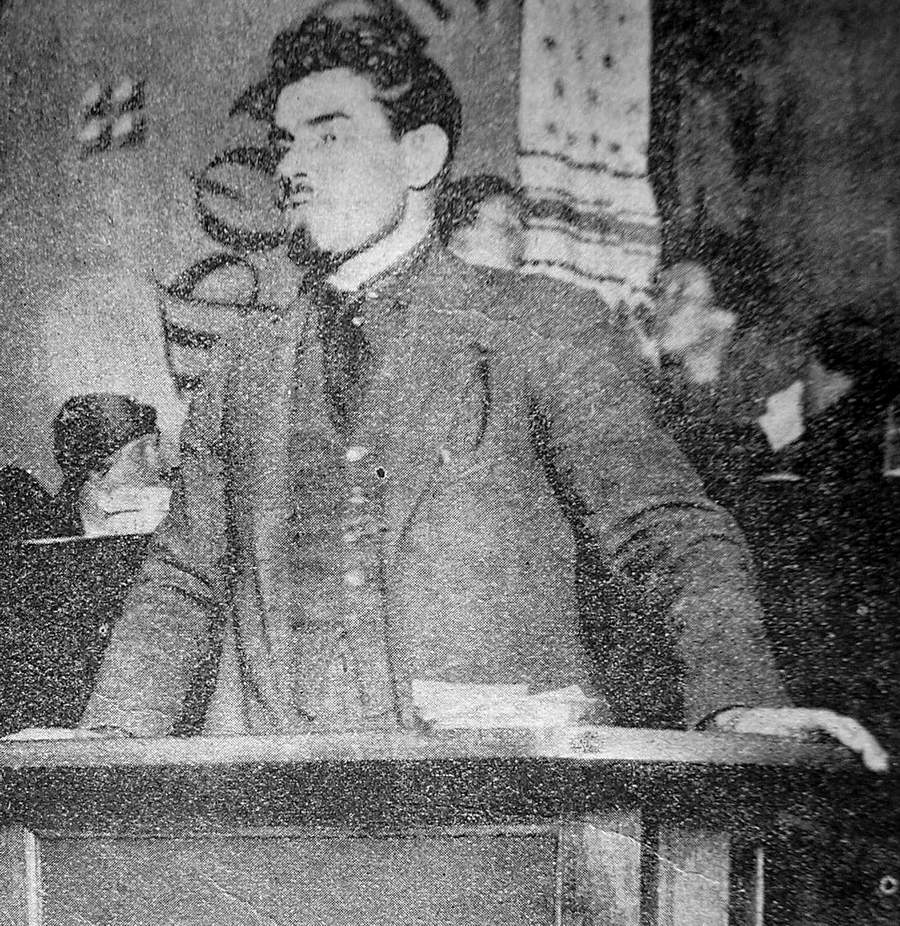
Oleksandr Shumskyi delivering a speech in 1924

The lack of progress of linguistic Ukrainization in the cities, especially amongst the ethnically Russian or highly Russified working class, concerned Oleksandr Shumskyi, who became Ukraine's Commissar of Education in the 1920s. In 1925, a few months after Stalin appointed Lazar Kaganovich to head the Ukrainian party, Shumsky appealed to Stalin to begin the Ukrainization of the working class and to replace Kaganovich with the ethnic Ukrainian Vlas Chubar. Stalin in response supported Kaganovich, whom he kept as a counterweight to Shumsky. Stalin formulated his views in a letter to the Ukrainian Politburo in April 1926, in which he attacked Shumsky and accused of him of two major errors: the first being the Ukrainization of the working class must stop and the second being that Ukrainization as the hands of the intelligentsia would likely adopt "the character of a battle for the alienation of Ukrainian culture and Ukrainian society from all-Union culture and society, the character of a battle against Russian culture and its highest achievement, against Leninism". Aleksandr Shumsky was soon replaced as commissar of education by the old Bolshevik Mykola Skrypnyk.

In April 1927 the Central Committee of the Communist Party of Ukraine adopted a resolution, which, while opposing the domination of Russian culture in Ukraine, recognized the "special status" of Russian language in the republic.

==== Mid-1920s to early 1930s ====
After Stalin's consolidation of power and he no longer needed to rely on bolstering his position by making cultural concessions to Ukraine, his attitudes towards Ukrainization became more negative and the CPU was ordered to prepare the first major trial of members of the pre-revolutionary intelligentsia, the so-called members of the "Change of the Landmarks" movement.

In 1926, Jozef Pilsudski, an old enemy of the Bolsheviks, came to power in Poland and the authoritarian government of Antanas Smetona was established in Lithuania, and the British government broke diplomatic ties with the Soviet Union after its intelligence agencies discovered the Soviet Union had been using a trade company as cover to spy on them. Stalin and the party leaders discussed the end of peaceful coexistence with the West, leading to a war scare. Yet, the Secret Police reported Ukrainians were increasingly dissatisfied with the regime and awaited the arrival of the Whites, Poles or Ukrainian nationalists, causing a drastic change in the Soviet nationality policy.

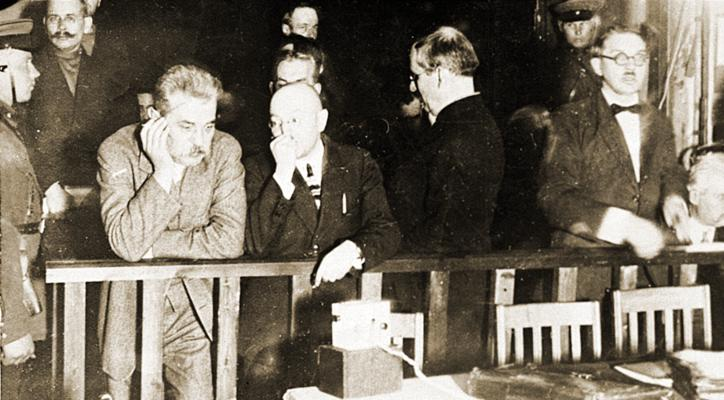
Serhiy Yefremov (on the left) during the Trial of the "Union for the Liberation of Ukraine" in March 1930

In the autumn of 1929, as leading figures of the korenizatsia policy were removed from their positions, the CPU attacked prominent Ukrainian academicians and educators in a highly publicized show trial of alleged nationalists. 474 individuals were tried and accused of belonging to the fictitious Union for the Liberation of Ukraine, whose members had allegedly conspired with Pilsudski and Ukrainian emigrants to start an uprising. Forty-five of those tried were found guilty and sentenced to forced labours camps for up to ten years. Amongst them was the vice president of the Ukrainian Academy of Sciences, Serhiy Yefremov, who was sentenced to death but had his sentence commuted to ten years imprisonment, during which he died.

In December 1930, the Stalin-led party secretariat issued a resolution on the writings of leading Soviet satirist Demian Bedny, who blamed the Russian peasantry's lack of enthusiasm for the socialist cause on traditional Russian laziness and backwardness. "False notes expressed in sweeping defamation of Russia and things Russian" was the response to the satirist. In a personal letter to Bedny, Stalin accused him of "libel against our people, discrediting the USSR, discrediting the proletariat of the USSR, discrediting the Russian proletariat".

Mykhailo Hrushevsky, the founder of the Central Rada, and the leader of the Ukrainian revolution, was arrested and exiled in 1931 and would die under suspicious circumstances in Russia in 1934.

In December 1932, during policy discussions that would eventually lead to the Holodomor, Stalin attacked Mykola Skrypnyk for non-Bolshevik conduct of Ukrainization and blamed resistance to forced collectivization and grain requisitions on agents of Jozef Pilsudski and Ukrainian nationalists. Stalin claimed that Ukrainization had been hijacked by foreign agents and nationalists who had alienated the Ukrainian peasantry from Moscow and endangered the communist project in the countryside.

The Politburo ordered a stop to the development of national consciousness amongst Ukrainians outside Soviet Ukraine, mainly in the Kuban region and Far Eastern regions where there existed a significant Ukrainian population. This decision led to the closure of newspapers, schools and teacher-training institutions and to the eventual Russification of hundreds of thousands of ethnic Ukrainians. Stalin also ended the practice of large groups of bureaucrats and engineers working for the ever-increasing number of institutions and enterprises belonging to the all-Union ministry learning the Ukrainian language within the USSR.

Fearing arrest, Mykola Skrypnyk committed suicide in July 1933. Two months earlier, the Ukrainian poet Mykola Khvylovy had shot himself. As early as 1926, Stalin had attacked Khvylovy for calling on Ukrainian writers to turn away from Moscow and orient themselves with Europe. Oleksandr Shumsky whom Stalin accused of protecting Khvylovy, was arrested in 1933 and murdered on Stalin's orders in 1946.

Even the Ukrainian orthography became a victim of Stalin's repressions: in 1933 a commission headed by Andriy Khvylia accused the previous writing system adopted in 1928 of being influenced by "bourgeois" Polish and Czech cultures and establishing barriers between the Ukrainian and Russian languages. As a result, a new orthography was introduced, bringing the spelling of many words closer to Russian. Modified in 1942, this orthography would also become compulsory in Galicia, Bukovyna and Zakarpattia following their annexation by the Soviet Union.

The reversal of indigenisation suspended the development of non-Russian languages and cultures at a moment when increasing numbers of peasants, driven by collectivization from the villages that had shielded them from the linguistic supervision of tsarist authorities, began to migrate to the cities. The cities, in which the Russian language and culture had been sponsored and where Ukrainian had been repressed, turning millions of Ukrainian speakers into Russian-speaking workers. Serhii Plokhy writes "In the 1930s, the Russification of the Ukrainians proceeded at a rate that imperial proponents of a big Russian nation could only have dreamed of".

==== Leadup to World War II ====
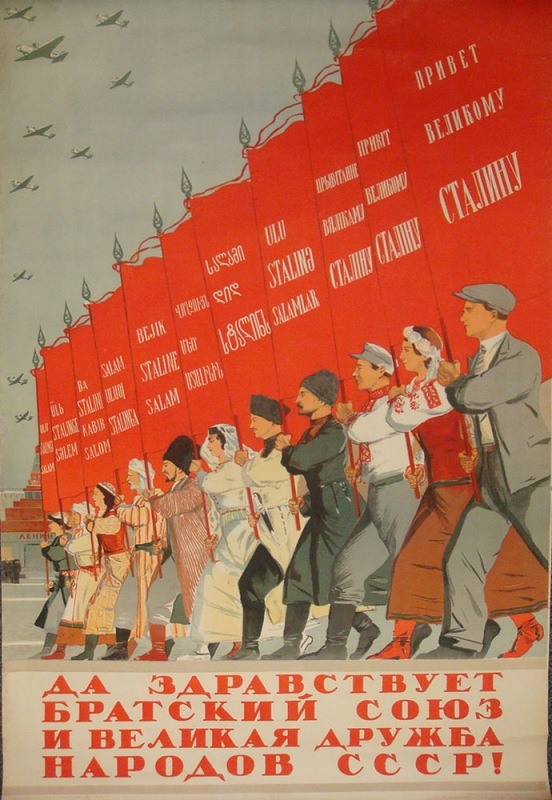
A Stalinist-era poster depicting stereotypical representatives of Soviet Union's main ethnic groups greeting Stalin in their national languages; the main inscription below is in Russian

At the 17th Party Congress in January 1934, Stalin remarked in his speech, "In Ukraine, even quite recently, the deviation toward Ukrainian nationalism did not represent the main danger, but when people ceased to struggle against it and allowed it to develop to such an extent that it closed ranks with the interventionists, that deviation became the main danger".

In July 1934, the Central Committee decided to begin preparing for state celebrations of the centennial of the death of Alexander Pushkin, a poet that had been fully ignored by officialdom during the previous decade. In June 1934, history classes that had been abolished in the 1920s were reintroduced. A few months prior at a special meeting of the Politburo, Stalin had decided on a new section of history, "the History of the USSR", putting special emphasis on Russia: "in the past, the Russian people gathered other peoples. It has begun a similar gathering now".

Stalin imagined the Soviet people as a family of nations united and led by the Russians. Numerous times he interchanged the terms "Russian" and "Soviet". In July 1933, raising a toast at a meeting with writers, Stalin told them to "drink to the Soviet people, to the most Soviet nation, to the people, who carried out the revolution before anyone else", "Once I said to Lenin that the very best people is the Russian people, the most Soviet nation".

The Tsars, who had been previously anathematized by the Bolsheviks, returned to favour under Stalin. In 1937, the feature film Peter the First was released to the public and was personally sanctioned by Stalin. The following year saw the release of Alexander Nevsky and in February 1939 the opera A Life for the Tsar was performed under the new name Ivan Susanin. Yet Stalin wanted more, arranging his aides to produce a film about another Russian tsar, Ivan the Terrible.

The Stalin regime's legitimization of Imperial Russian culture and politics helped mobilise Russian nationalism across the Soviet Union and solidified Russia's role as the leading Soviet nation whilst subordinating the other republics.

On 30 January 1936, the leading Soviet newspaper, Pravda, published a front-page photo of Joseph Stalin embracing a cheerful young Buryat girl. The article on the front page accompanying the article was entitled "One Family of Peoples". The article emphasized the Russian role in the Soviet Union, "With the active assistance of the Russian proletariat, Buryat-Mongolia has taken the road of progress". The article praised the Russians as the leading Soviet nation and lashed out at those who questioned that role, "The nation that has given the world such geniuses as Lomonosov, Lobachevsky, Popov, Pushkin, Chernyshevsky, Mendeleev, and such giants of humanity as Lenin and Stalin – a nation that prepared and carried out the October Socialist revolution under the leadership of the Bolshevik Party-such a nation can be called a 'nation of Oblomovs' only by someone who takes no account of what he is talking about". The article promoted a growing feeling within the party that the Russians stood above the other nations of the Soviet Union.

In May 1936, Pravda lauded the party of all Soviet peoples, placing special emphasis on the Russians, "First among these equals are the Russian people, the Russian workers and the Russian toilers, whose role throughout the whole great proletarian revolution has been exceptionally large, from the first victories to the present day's brilliant period of development". In the fall of 1938, the journal Bolshevik published an article placing special emphasis on the Russian people, "the Great Russian people leads the struggle of all the peoples of the Soviet land for the happiness of mankind, for communism".

The formula used by Soviet propaganda to define and portray relations between the Soviet nations was the "friendship of peoples". But regarding relations between the regime and the population, officialdom appeared to consider some nations friendlier to the state than others. In the years leading up to the outbreak of World War II, Stalin prepared his country for possible foreign invasion and cleared the front lines of potential traitors. Ethnicity rather than class became the new criteria of traitor. If the Russians had been deemed model citizens, then non-Russians with traditional homelands or significant diasporas outside the USSR were seen as potential traitors and were targeted in a number of repressive operations that culminated in the Great Terror. First on the list were Soviet citizens of German, Polish and Japanese origin as well as nationally conscious Ukrainians. Between August 1937 and November 1938, the Soviet regime sentenced more than 335,000 people who had been arrested as part of the "nationality operations", 73% were executed.

By 1939, the USSR had long ceased to regard Ukrainians living in Poland as a bridgehead to promoting world revolution, but with the rise of Germany treated them as well as Ukrainians living in the USSR as a potential threat to the USSR in the event of a German invasion. After the German dismantlement of Czechoslovakia in 1939, its eastern region declared independence as Transcarpathian Ukraine. This set a strong precedent for Stalin, who wanted no more Ukrainian enclaves outside of the USSR which could function as possible bridgeway for a future invasion. On August 24, the Soviet foreign minister Vyacheslav Molotov signed the non-aggression treaty with the German foreign minister Joachim von Ribbentrop, with photos showing a joyful Stalin the foreground.

In order to prepare for and consolidate his annexations, Stalin made concessions to nationality discourse and policy. The rehabilitation of the traditional Ukrainian historical narrative began a few years before the start of World War II in preparation for the war and as part of the rehabilitated Russian imperial narrative. Only those parts of the Ukrainian narrative that fitted pre-revolutionary imperial narrative were selected for inclusion and were often highly distorted. The key symbol of the new treatment was Hetman Bohdan Khmelnytsky, who had been denounced in Soviet literature of the mid-1930s. Khmelnytsky's controversial position from both a socialist persecutionary and a Ukrainian nationalist perspective meant his rehabilitation began in Moscow, not in Kyiv, and was undertaken at the highest level.

By the summer of 1940, concessions to Ukrainian cultural policy once again became taboo, Mykhailo Marchenko, who had been appointed the new president of the Lviv University after being transported in from Kyiv out of suspicion of the local Ukrainian intelligentsia, was removed from his position and arrested in June 1941 on charges of maintaining ties with the Ukrainian nationalist underground.

After the unprecedented fall of Paris in 1940, Stalin and his team invested much time on identifying potential supporters of a German invasion of Ukraine. Whilst the Poles were still disloyal to Moscow, they were not Teutonophiles - the execution of thousands of Polish intellectuals was carried out with little secrecy and widely known. There was however a different attitude among Ukrainians, the elderly fondly remembered Austrian rule, which had created opportunities for Ukrainians to assert themselves whilst the younger generation had witnessed victims of the Holodomor try cross the border and had high hopes the Nazis would establish an independent Ukraine. Hence, Ukrainian nationalists became the main target of the Soviet occupation authorities. In May 1941, more than 11,000 Ukrainians were deported from the former Polish territories to Siberia.

==== From World War II to 1953 ====
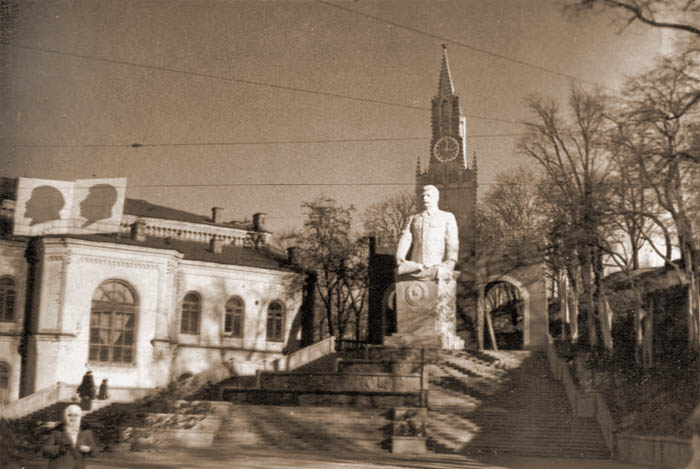
A monument of Stalin with a miniature copy of Moscow Kremlin, which was installed in Kyiv during the Soviet rule

A few days after Molotov's speech, edited by Stalin, who was too stunned to read it, announcing Hitler's invasion of the Soviet Union, Aleksandr Aleksandrov and Vasily Lebedev-Kumach wrote the Russian-language song titled The Sacred War that would lead every Soviet morning broadcast from the autumn of 1941 until 1945. According to one theory, the lyrics had actually not been written by Lebedev-Kumach, but by a peasant school teacher, Aleksandr Bode in 1916, during WW1, with Lebedev allegedly replacing "teutonic" with "fascist" and "our Russian native land" with "our Great Union".

By the fall of 1941, all the non-Russian provinces of the western USSR had been lost to German divisions advancing eastwards, crushing the resistance of the Red Army, composed of many with little sense of loyalty to the regime, of conscripts, and, in the case of Ukraine, of victims of the famine. Hence, in Stalin's next speech, there was no reference to non-Russians and the war became for him solely a Russian undertaking.

During the war Stalin made concessions to the Russian Orthodox Church, allowing the election of the Moscow Patriarchate, which had been vacant since the 1920s, thus an important element of imperial Russian identity and nationalism had returned whilst other national denominations such as the Ukrainian Autocephalous Orthodox Church and the Ukrainian Greek Catholic Church continued to be suppressed.

In November 1943, Georgy Aleksandrov, the head of the propaganda department of the party's Central Committee in Moscow, criticised Ukrainian writers for a letter celebrating the liberation of Kyiv from Nazi occupation. Aleksandrov was infuriated as he believed the letter implied that there were "two leading peoples in the Soviet Union, the Russians and the Ukrainians" although it was his opinion that it was "universally accepted that the Russian people was the elder brother in the Soviet Union's family of peoples".

In the partially relaxed cultural scene of World War Two, Ukrainian historians and authors protested attempts by Russian authors to appropriate Danylo of Halych as a "Russian" prince rather claiming him as his their own.

The Soviet victory against Germany marked the end of the nationality policy, which had begun in 1939 to appease the non-Russian Republics of the Union. After the war, the status of the non-Russian republics was diminished and Russian dominance was restored. At the end of the war, Stalin moved to reestablish full party control over culture. At a highly publicized toast he delivered on 24 May 1945, at the Kremlin, Stalin remarked, "I would like to raise a toast to the health of our Soviet people and, first and foremost, of the Russian people. I drink first and foremost to the health of the Russian people because it is the foremost of all our nations making up the Soviet Union". The speech was printed and reprinted in Soviet newspapers for decades to follow.

Oleksandr Korniychuk had been made aware of the return to Russian cultural dominance before Stalin's speech, in May 1945 his award-winning play Bohdan Khmelnytsky was removed from production, allegedly after the visit of a pro-Soviet Polish delegation, however, the even more anti-Polish Russian play Ivan Susanin reworked from A Life for the Tsar remained.

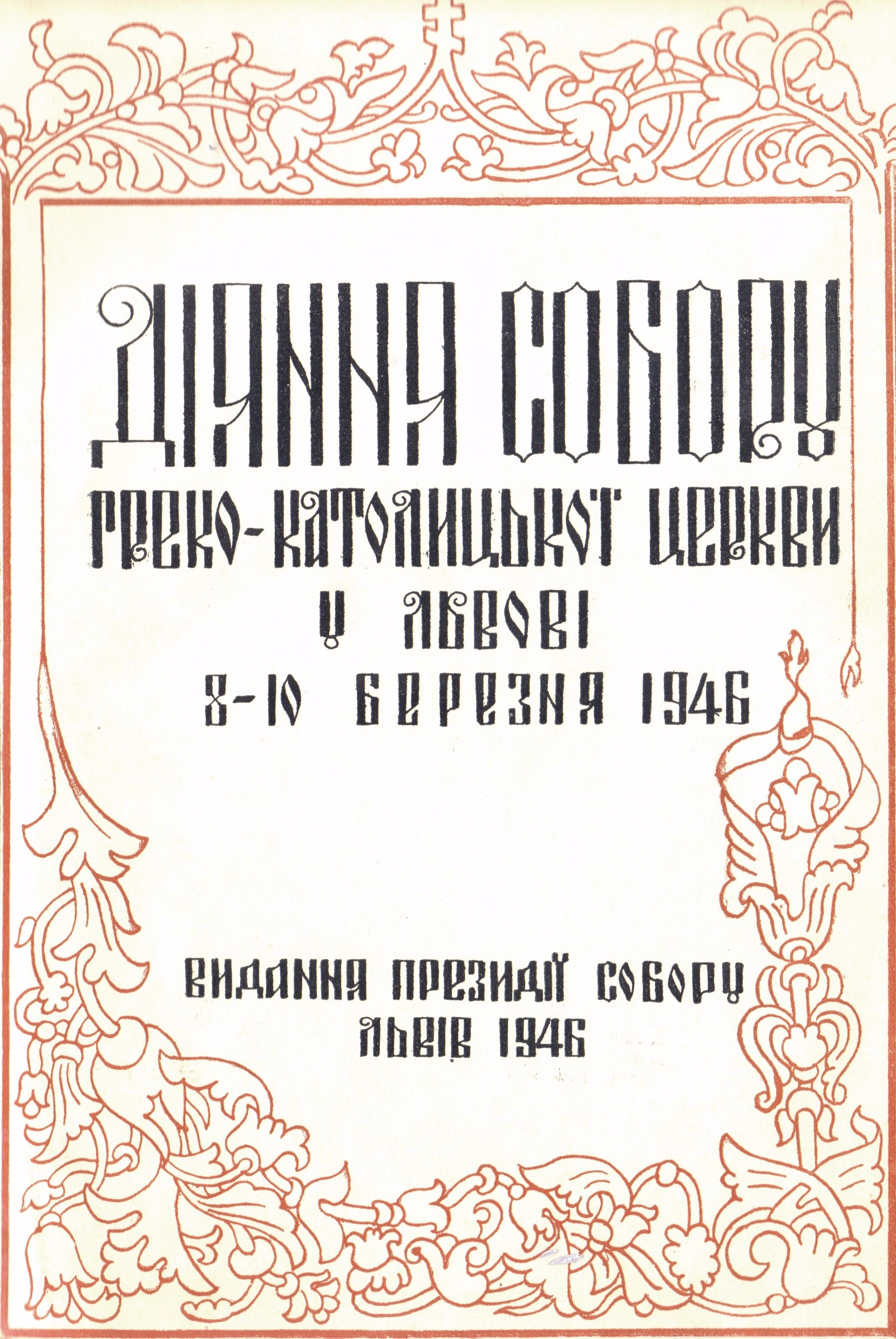
Acts of the Lviv Synod of 1946, which officially liquidated the Ukrainian Greek Catholic Church

After the end of the war, Stalin moved to reestablish party control over ideology and culture and restore the primacy of Russia and Russians in the Soviet hierarchy. Starting in 1946, party resolutions were passed to combat alleged nationalist deviations in the republics including Ukraine. In 1946, Stalin arranged the liquidation of the Ukrainian Catholic Church in Galicia by following the Imperial Russian model of absorption of the Uniates by the Russian Orthodox Church and by forcefully transferring ownership of Ukrainian Uniate churches to the Russian Orthodox Church as well as the liquidation of Ukrainian Uniate clergy.

Literary history became a target in Ukraine. Studies that drew a direct line from the "Polish squires" and "Westernizers and liberals of old" to Ukrainian literature were attacked for neglecting apparent links between Ukrainian and Russian literature and culture. The opera Bohdan Khmelnytsky was revised and criticised for its failure to represent the progressive role of the Russian people.

Olekzandr Dovzhenko, Ukraine's best-known filmmaker, found himself under attack from the authorities and confined to Moscow, forbidden from visiting Ukraine. In 1951, a campaign was launched against one of Ukraine's best poets of the time, Volodymyr Sosiura, for his poem Love Ukraine (1944), condemned as a manifestation of Ukrainian nationalism.

Among the victims of Russification in postwar Ukraine were millions of orphan children, who were put under state care and transferred to other republics. Such children would frequently be given Russian-sounding names such as Ivanov, Petrov or Sidorov, and listed in documents as ethnic Russians.

=== Nikita Khrushchev ===
==== State policies ====
Nikita Khrushchev took part in the Stalin-inspired attack on Ukrainian cultural figures during his tenure in power in Ukraine that ended in December 1949.

During Stalin's funeral, the new head of the Soviet government, Georgi Malenkov, remarked, "the solution of one of the most complicated problems in the history of social development, the national question, is associated with the name of Comrade Stalin", "for the first time in history, the supreme theoretician of the national question, Comrade Stalin, made possible the liquidation of age-old national dissensions on the scale of a huge multinational state". Plokhy writes, "Conspicuously, Malenkov failed to mention Russia in his praise of Stalin's achievements on the nationalities front. In fact, the Russocentrism of Soviet nationality policy constituted Stalin's main amendment to Lenin's formula for handling the nationality question".

In June 1953, the new head of security in the USSR gained approval from the party leadership for measures aiming to end the Russification of the non-Russian republics: the first secretaries of party committees had to learn or know the respective language. However, by the end of June 1953 Beria was arrested and by the end of the year shot, accused of attempts to revive bourgeois nationalist elements in the republics and undermine friendship between the peoples of the USSR and the "great Russian people".

Ukraine received its first ethnically Ukrainian party boss in 1953, thirty-five years after the creation of the Ukrainian Communist Party. In 1954, the Presidium Soviet of the Soviet Union transferred authority of the Crimean peninsula from the Russian SFSR to the Ukrainian SSR. Some historians interpret this as a move by Khrushchev to garner support among Ukrainians.

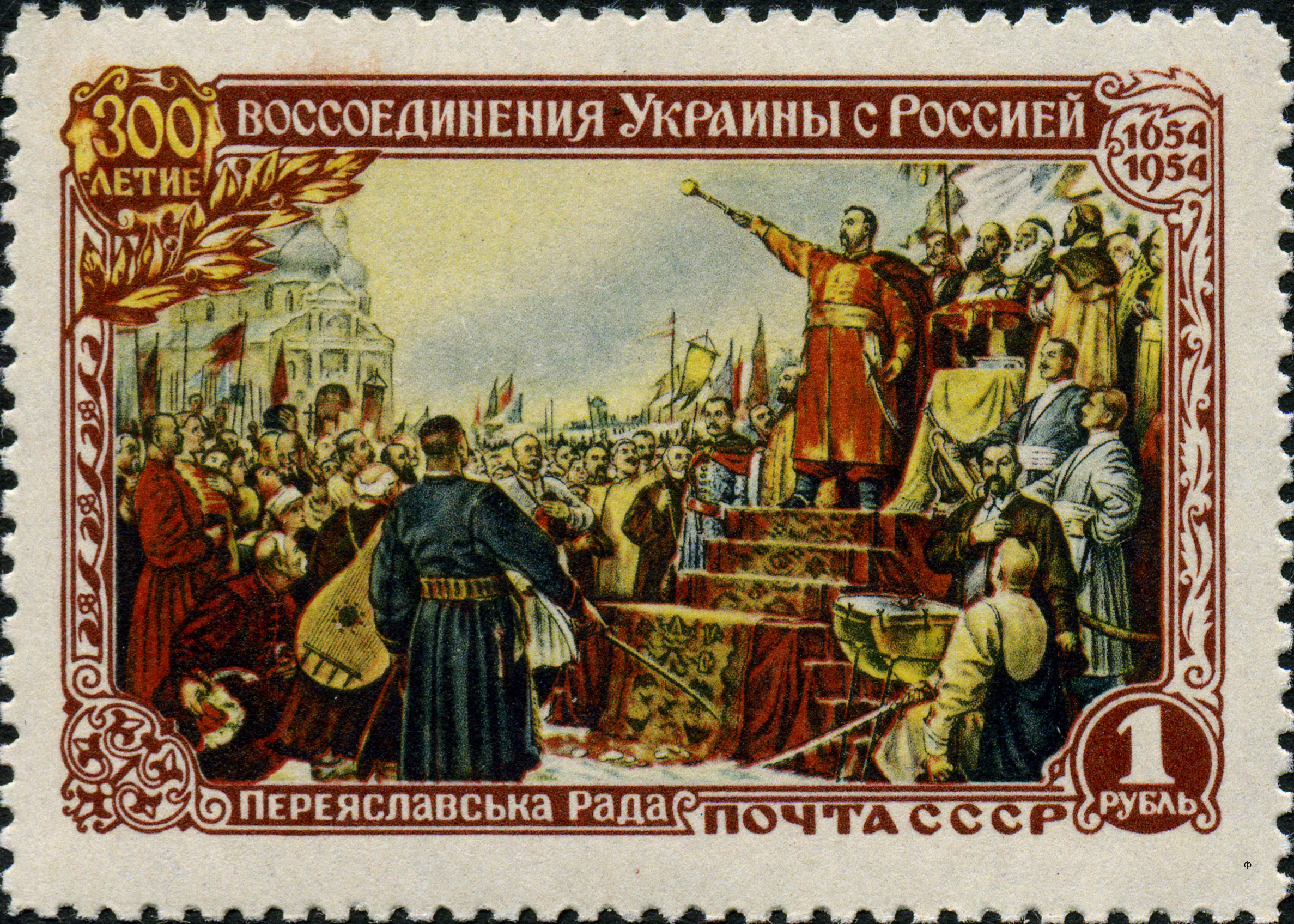
A Soviet post stamp marking the 300th anniversary of Pereyaslav Council in 1954

In January 1954, Khrushchev launched his first major public initiative, a lavish celebration of the tercentenary of Bohdan Khmelnytsky's acceptance of Russian suzerainty. Although the Pereyaslav Council of 1654 marked the decision of some of the Ukrainian Cossack officers to accept the protectorate of the Muscovite tsar, the accompanying ideological campaign and how the anniversary was to be officially celebrated were based on the "Theses on the Reunifcation of Ukraine and Russia". The event was only to be referred to as such according to an endorsement by the Central Committee in Moscow.

The theses on the anniversary of the alleged reunification approved by the Central Committee in Moscow read, "the reunion of Ukraine and Russia helped considerably to strengthen the Russian state and enhance its international prestige". Hence, an event condemned by Soviet historians in the 1920s as absolutely evil, recast in the 1930s as a lesser evil was now declared wholly positive.

During the Twenty-Second Party Congress convened in October 1961, Khrushchev announced an ambitious program for the transformation of Soviet society and promised "that the present generation of Soviet people will live under communism!". Khrushchev promised the Soviet Union and the world that communism would be achieved within 20 years. According to Marxist dogma, national differences would disappear under communism. According to party officials, since communism would soon be achieved, there was no reason to maintain distinctions but rather their merger should be accelerated.

Khrushchev declared from the podium of the party congress: "A new historical community of peoples of various nationalities with common characteristics-the Soviet people - has taken shape in the USSR". Bukharin's concept of the "Soviet people" was expected to supersede nations in a few decades and reduce them to mere nationalities.

The party believed that the new Soviet people must be built on the foundations of the Russian language and culture. The party's program reflected its goals by pointing not to the future but the reality, Khrushchev remarked, "the Russian language has in fact become the common language of international exchange and cooperation among all peoples of the USSR".

After 1957, when Khrushchev had consolidated power, no longer having to allow the republics more freedom to craft their own cultural policies and providing greater economic freedom to bolster his position, he brought in purges of republican elites in Ukraine and introduced new initiatives aimed at the cultural Russification of the republic.

In 1958, the Union parliament passed a law removing the provision stating children of non-Russian families were to be educated in their native language and allowing parents to choose the language of instruction. With most universities teaching in Russian and highly paid jobs and official positions only open to Russian speakers, the law made the Russification of the Soviet educational system and Ukrainian students inevitable. During a visit to the Belarusian State University, Khrushchev declared, "the sooner we all speak Russian, the more quickly we shall build communism".

Khrushchev's instructions were heeded: in 1958 60% of books published in Ukraine were in Ukrainian, in 1959, only 53%, by 1960, only 49% and by 1965, only 41%. The decline in Ukrainian-language publications occurred simultaneously with a dramatic increase in the amount of Russian publications.

The increased number of Russian-language publications and the decreased number of Ukrainian-language publications reflected the Russification of the educational system in Ukraine. In Ukraine, between 1951 and 1956 the percentage of students learning only in Russian language increased from 18% to 31%. During the same period, the percentage of Ukrainian students in Ukrainian-language schools fell from 81% to 65%. In 1959, only 23% of students in Kyiv were being taught in Ukrainian, while 73% were being taught in Russian. As Russification of the educational system accelerated, more and more students in Russian-language schools refused to take Ukrainian even as a subject.

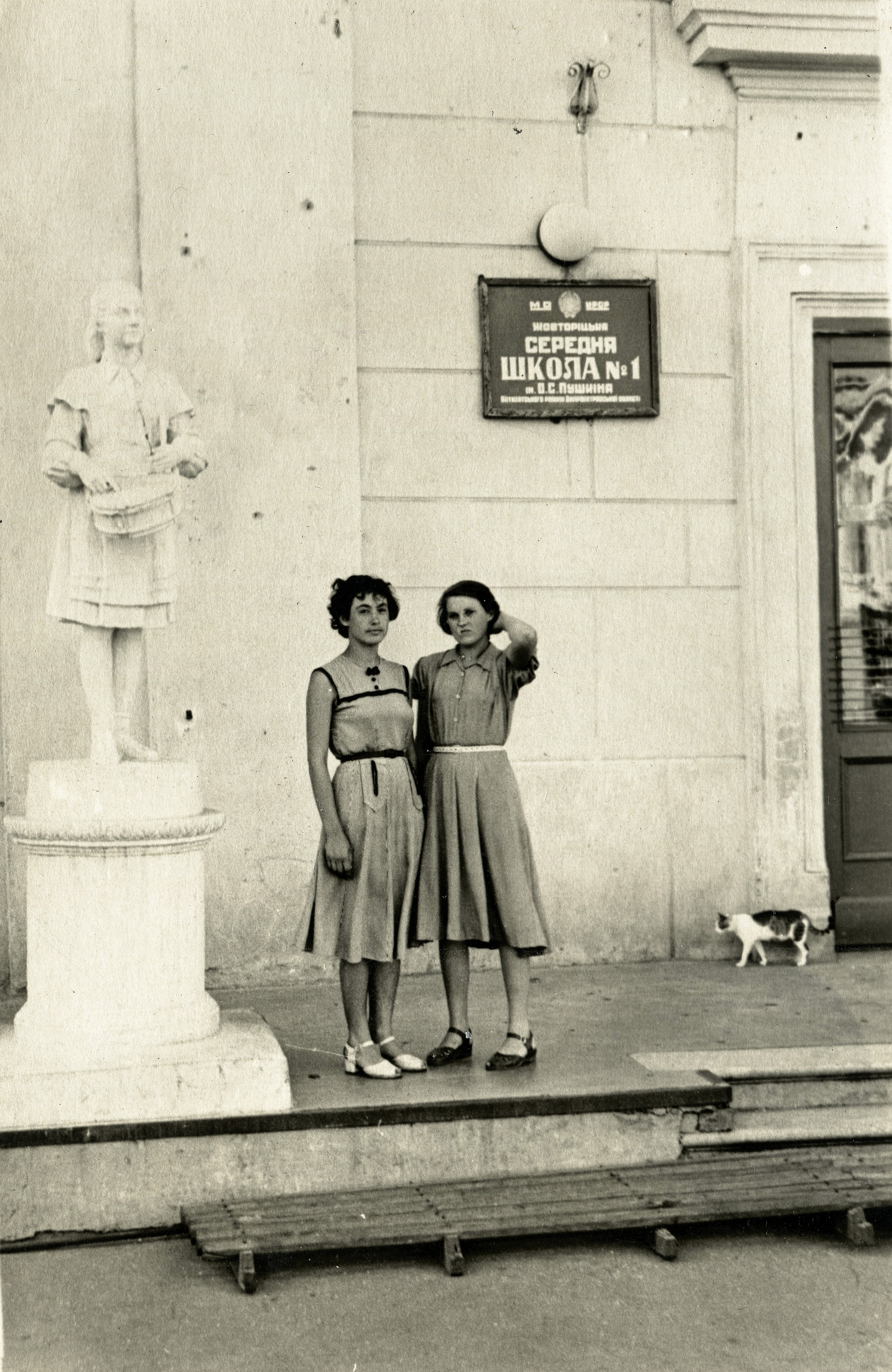
Pupils of a school named after Russian poet Alexander Pushkin in Zhovti Vody, 1957

Number of pupils studying at Ukrainian- and Russian-language schools in the Ukrainian SSR, thousands

Years	Ukrainian	%	Russian	%
1951-1952	5551	81,3	1207	17,7
1955-1956	3846	72,8	1392	26,3
1961-1962	4170	64,5	2000	30,9

Number of schoolchildren attending Ukrainian- and Russian-language schools by city in 1958-1959, thousands (compared to percentage of ethnic Ukrainians in the particular city)

Cities	Ukrainian	%	Russian	%	Ukrainians, %
Kyiv	22,5	26,8	61,2	73,1	66
Kharkiv	9,9	4,1	68,8	95,1	49
Odesa	4,7	8,1	53	91,9	40
Dnipropetrovsk	11,1	17,45	52,3	82,6	58
Donetsk	0,9	1,2	76,3	98,8	38
Voroshylovhrad	1,5	6,5	21,7	93,5	44
Ivano-Frankivsk	2,7	39,4	4,1	60,6	66

Establishments of professional, special and higher education in the Ukrainian SSR, with the exception of cultural and pedagogical schools, were among those most affected by Russification. As of 1960, among over 35,000 Ukrainian scientists in the USSR 36,4% worked outside of Ukraine. Among 22,523 scientific workers active in Ukrainian SSR, only 48,3% belonged to Ukrainian ethnicity. In most universities of the republic Russian language dominated in the curriculum, while Ukrainian was only used by departments of Ukrainian language, literature and social sciences. Among higher technical, industrial, medical, economic and agricultural schools most used the Russian language, except of some establishments in Western Ukraine.

Following the approval of changes to Russian orthography and punctuation in 1956, similar corrections were introduced for Ukrainian orthography in 1960.

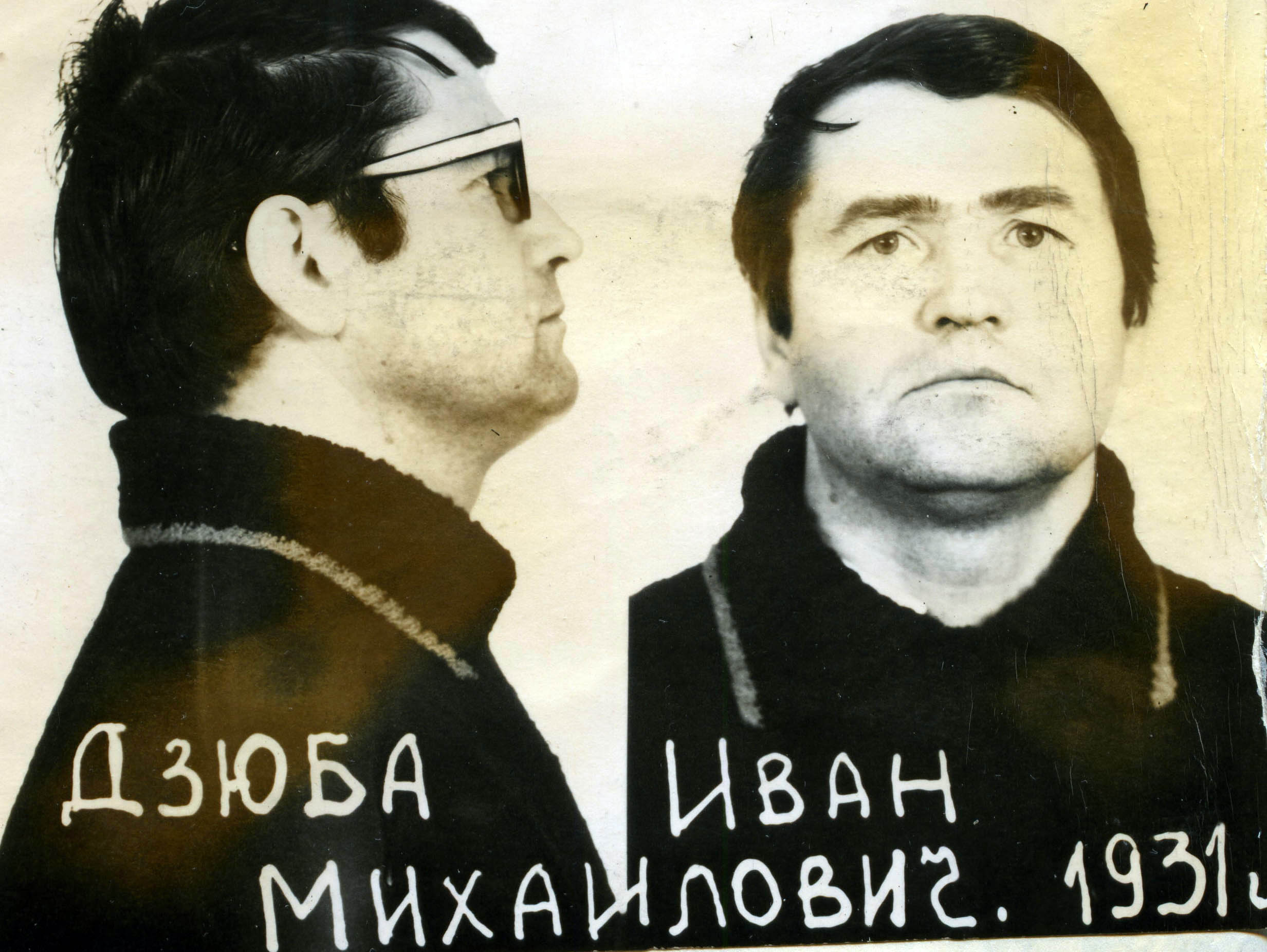
Ivan Dziuba following his arrest by the KGB in 1973

==== Opposition ====
Starting from the early 1960s, a movement resisting the ongoing Russification arose among the Ukrainian intelligentsia and part of workers. Its participants demanded the provision of Ukrainian-language education in schools, kindergartens and higher educational establishments, introduction of official correspondence in Ukrainian in the government, industry, transport and trade, increase in the number of Ukrainian publications and films. An important figure in the movement was Ivan Dziuba, author of the brochure Internationalism or Russification?. However, the authorities answered the movement's demands with increased repression against its participants.

=== Leonid Brezhnev ===
==== Brezhnev's early policies ====
A major ideological shift occurred in the Soviet Union with the removal of Nikita Khrushchev in October 1964 in a coup orchestrated by his former protégés and conservative elements of the party led by Leonid Brezhnev. Unlike Khrushchev, and his promises of the attainment of communism, Brezhnev announced that the Soviet Union had developed and achieved socialism and would have to remain content with it, yet he did not discard the program and commitment to the idea of one Soviet nation.

By the early 1970s, Brezhnev had made the concept of the Soviet nation the centerpiece of his nationality policy. The party propaganda apparatus launched a campaign promoting the Soviet way of life. The new edition of the Great Soviet Encyclopedia was introduced that omitted the reference to communism but retained references to the Russian language, "the common language of international communication in the USSR is the Russian language".

Cultural Russification became official policy in the Soviet Union under Brezhnev, the marginalization and degradation of non-Russian languages and their elimination from the educational system began in 1970, when a decree was issued ordering that all graduate theses be written in Russian and approved in Moscow. At an all-Union conference in Tashkent in 1979 new ways to improve Russian-language instruction were proposed; beginning in 1983, bonuses were paid to teachers of Russian in schools with non-Russian-language instruction. Cultural Russification was strengthened and encouraged as the idea of building one Soviet nation occupied the party.

The Khrushchev Thaw allowed the growth of a cultural revival in Russia. The "Thaw" initiated a rising nationalist trend in the conservative Russian intelligentsia headed by Aleksandr Solzhenitsyn. The preservation of historical and religious moments found their ways into the works of Russian authors, who focused on the devastation of the Russian village and who ushered in a new genre of Russian literature, "village prose".

After attacking manifestations of Russian nationalism in literary and cultural life, Aleksandr Yakovlev, the interim head of the party propaganda apparatus, was dismissed from his positions and sent into exile. The party leadership were willing to sacrifice Yakovlev in order to make peace and accommodate the rising nationalist trend in the Russian intelligentsia and sponsored multi-million copy press runs of works by Anatolii Ivanov, the head of the conservative Russian nationalist "Molodaia gvardiia".

While the party made peace with moderate Russian nationalism, Moscow strongly attacked non-Russian nationalism in the republics, partially in Ukraine, where the 1960s had witnessed a revival of national consciousness (the Sixtiers generation). This group included the poet Ivan Drach, Lina Kostenko and Vasyl Stus, who was arrested and sent to the Gulag where he died.

The Ukrainian national revival officially ended in May 1972 with the dismissal of the strong-willed first secretary of the Communist Party of Ukraine, Petro Shelest, who was a national communist and supported the development of Ukrainian culture and identity. After being transferred to Moscow, Shelest was accused of idealising Ukrainian Cossackdom and other nationalist deviations.

During the aftermath of Shelest's dismissal, transfer to Moscow and accusations of Ukrainian nationalism, the KGB began to arrest nationally minded intellectuals and purging Ukrainian institutions. As Plokhy writes, "Under the party leadership of Brezhnev loyalist Volodymyr Shcherbytsky, Ukraine was turned into an exemplary Soviet republic. With dissidents confined to the Gulag, there was nothing to stop the triumphal march of Soviet nation-building, which in Ukraine meant the reincarnation in socialist guise of the imperial model of the big Russian nation".

==== Effects of Russification by early 1970s ====
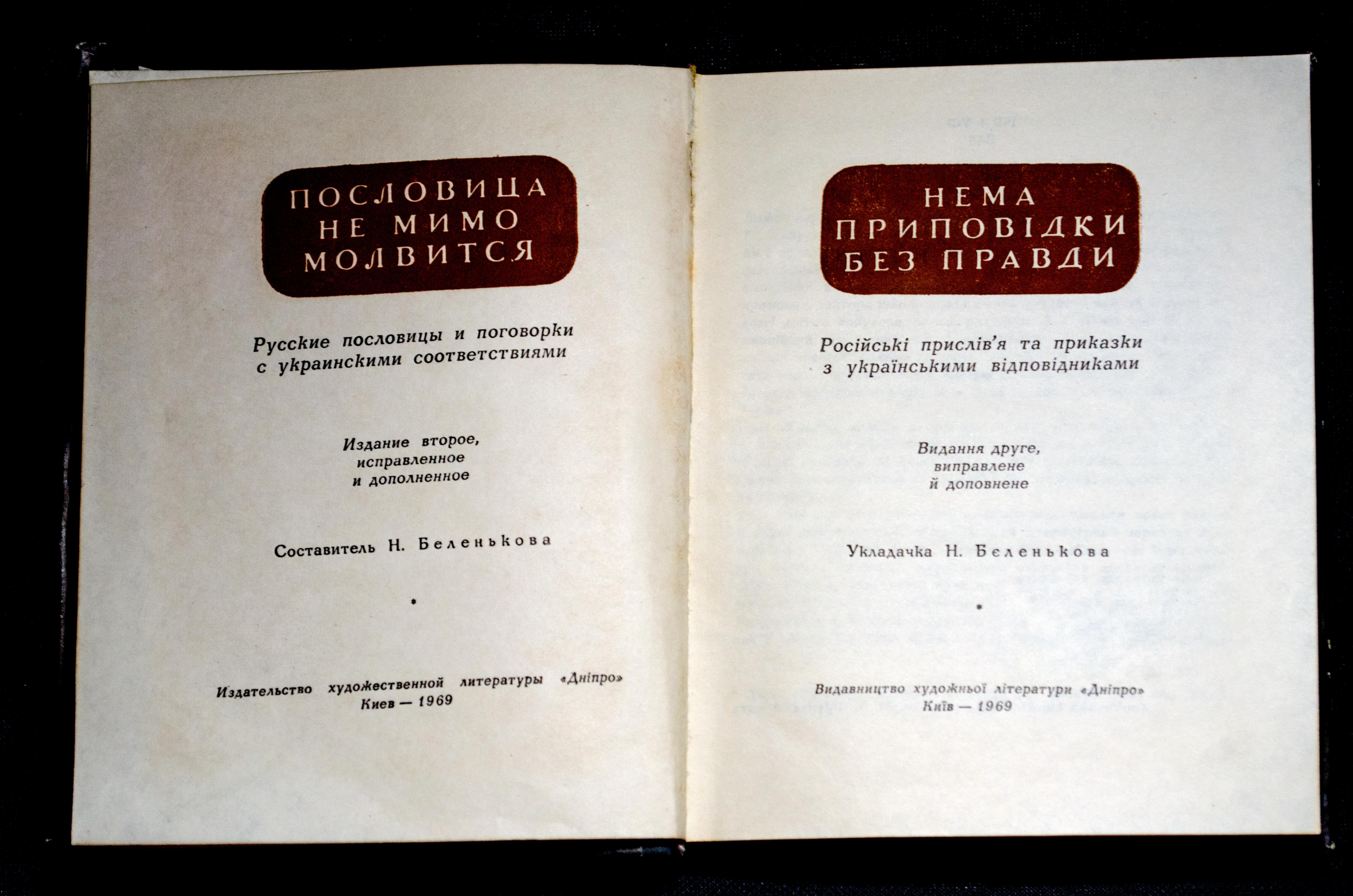
A bilingual Russian-Ukrainian book of proverbs printed in Kyiv in 1969

The ongoing Russification led to a decrease in the number of high school graduates, doctors and scientists in Ukraine. As of 1972-1973 151 university students corresponded to 10,000 ethnic Ukrainians in the Soviet Union, compared to 214 among the same number of ethnic Russians on average. Among all scientific works published in Soviet Ukraine during 1966, 81,8% were printed in Russian, and only 17% in Ukrainian. A similar proportion existed among publications of the Academy of Sciences of Ukrainian SSR. All abstracts of doctor's and candidate's papers at the Academy were presented exclusively in Russian language.

In the sphere of publishing, the number of publications in Ukrainian language issued in Soviet Ukraine declined from 4,041 in 1961 to 2,981 in 1973, meanwhile the number of Russian-language publications remained relatively stable (4,416 in 1961, 4,403 in 1973). The number of Ukrainian-language magazines during the same period increased from 51 to 63, meanwhile among Russian-language publications the number comprised 26 and 41 respectiely. As of 1973 131 Ukrainian-language book series were published in the Ukrainian SSR, compared to 269 Russian-language ones. During the same year, 802 newspapers were published in Ukrainian compared to 427 in Russian, however that number didn't include all-Union publications which spread to Ukraine.

During the same time, the number of Ukrainian-language books in public libraries of Soviet Ukraine was estimated to be around 10-20%, with the rest being dominated by Russian-language publications. Between 1940 and 1972, the number of museums in the Ukrainian SSR had decreased from 174 to 147, the number of theatres - from 140 to 72. Russian language dominated on the radio and in television, and Ukrainian technical and scientific language was increasingly being brought into accordance with Russian language norms. The general postulate promoted by Soviet policies claimed, that the Russian language was the only way for Soviet citizens to get access to main achievements of world culture, literature, science and technology, meanwhile the function of other languages was limited to literature and art.

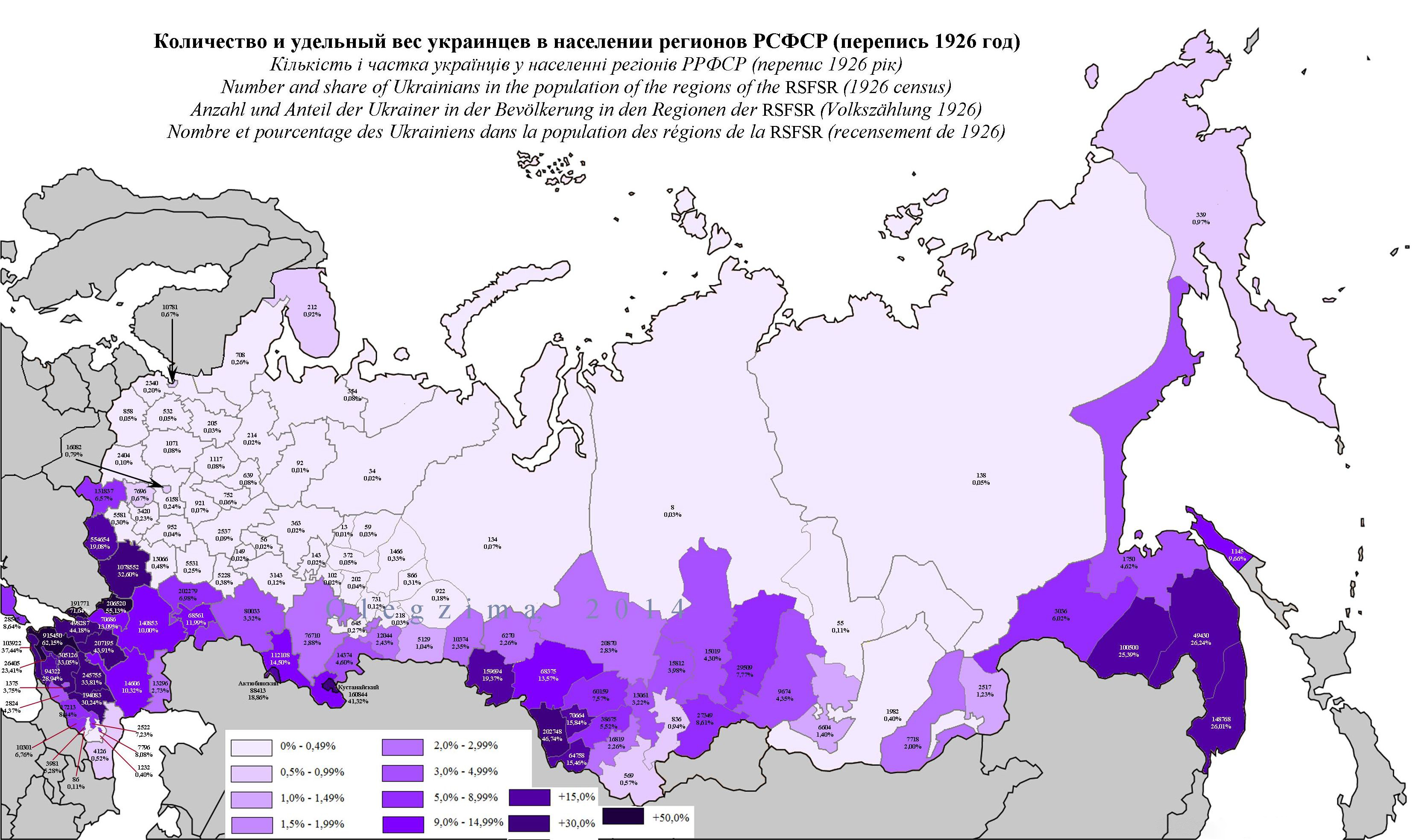
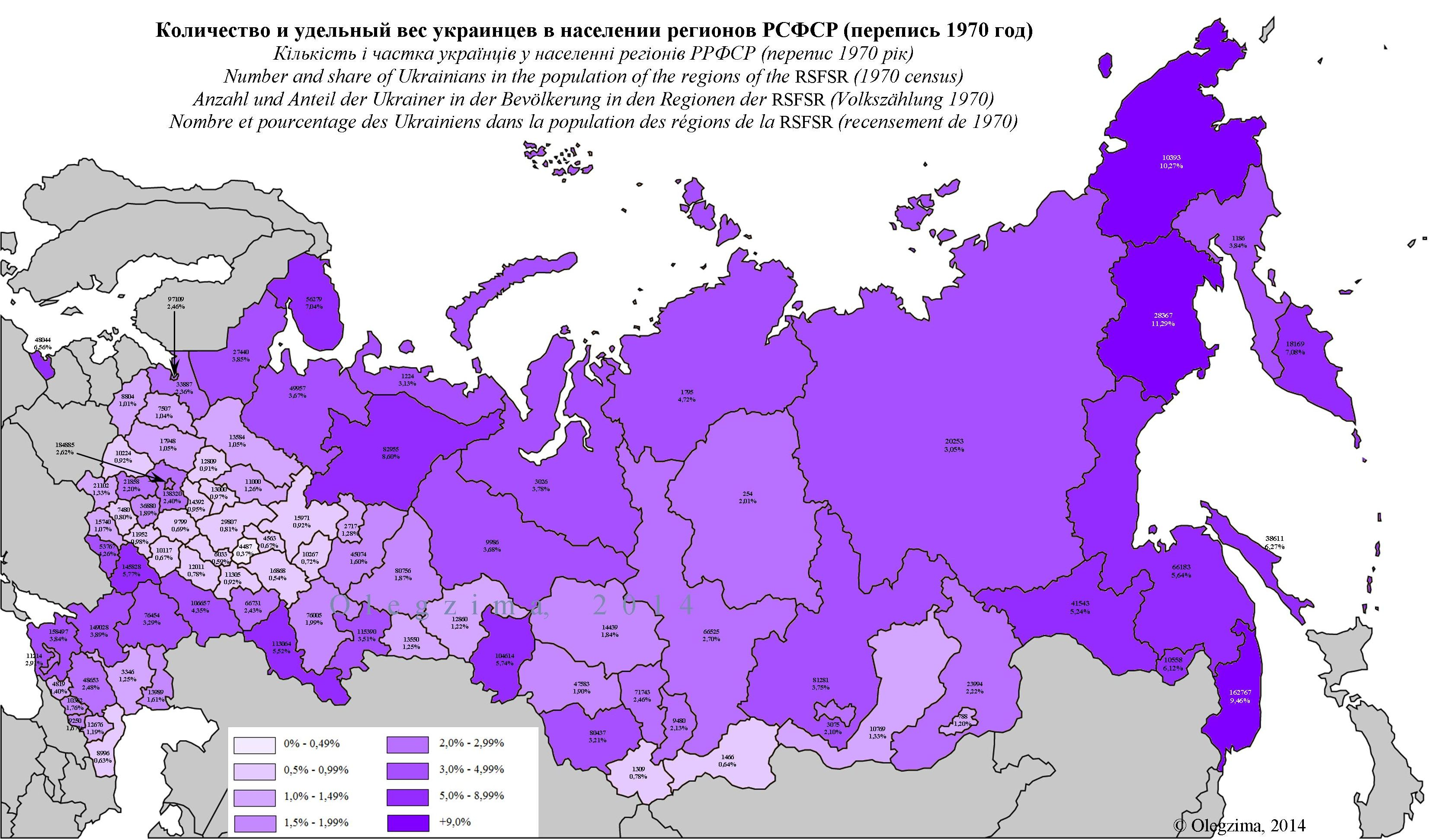
Percentage of ethnic Ukrainians populating the regions of Russian SFSR in 1926 (top) and 1970 (bottom)

The colonial policy applied by the Soviet Union in respect to Ukraine led to the increase of the number of ethnic Russians in the country and contributed to the Russification of native population. The number of ethnic Ukrainians recognizing Russian as their native language increased from 4,5% in 1926 to 6,5% in 1959 and 8,5% in 1970; the total number of Russian speakers in Ukrainian SSR increased from 4,5 million (11,9%) in 1926 to 10,2 million (24,4%) in 1959 and 13,3 million (31,6%) in 1970. As of 1970 Russian was a second language for 13,5 million people in Soviet Ukraine, but only 4,4 million spoke Ukrainian as a second language. Russian language was the most widespread in cities: among urban inhabitants, only 7,4% could not speak Russian, compared to 30,6% who didn't speak Ukrainian. The biggest number of Russified non-Russians lived in regions with significant ethnic Russian populations, such as Crimea, Donetsk, Dnipropetrovsk, Kharkiv and Odessa Oblasts

The effects of Russification on areas separated from the Ukrainian ethnic territory and attached to Russian SFSR, such as parts of Sloboda Ukraine in Belgorod, Kursk, Voronezh and Rostov Oblasts, as well as Kuban (western Krasnodar Krai), were even more severe: following the crackdown on Ukrainization, the ethnic Ukrainian population in those territories decreased from over 3,3 million in 1926 to little more than 500,000 in 1970; during the same time the percentage of native Ukrainian speakers in those areas fell to only 180,000. Similar processes took place in Northern Caucasus, the Volga, in the Urals and in the Far East. At the same time, Soviet rule led to mass resettlement of Ukrainians into territories which previously had no significant Ukrainian population, such as the Far North, as well as Estonia, Latvia and Lithuania. In those areas Ukrainians were also subjected to Russification.

Aimed to create a single "Soviet people" characterized by Russian language and culture, the process of Russification was driven in part by people of Ukrainian ethnic origin, who entered the Communist party and Soviet government in Ukraine on career grounds. Among the most infamous Russifiers of Ukrainian origin under the Soviet rule were Valentyn Malanchuk, Ivan Bilodid and Andriy Skaba.

==== 1970s to early 1980s ====
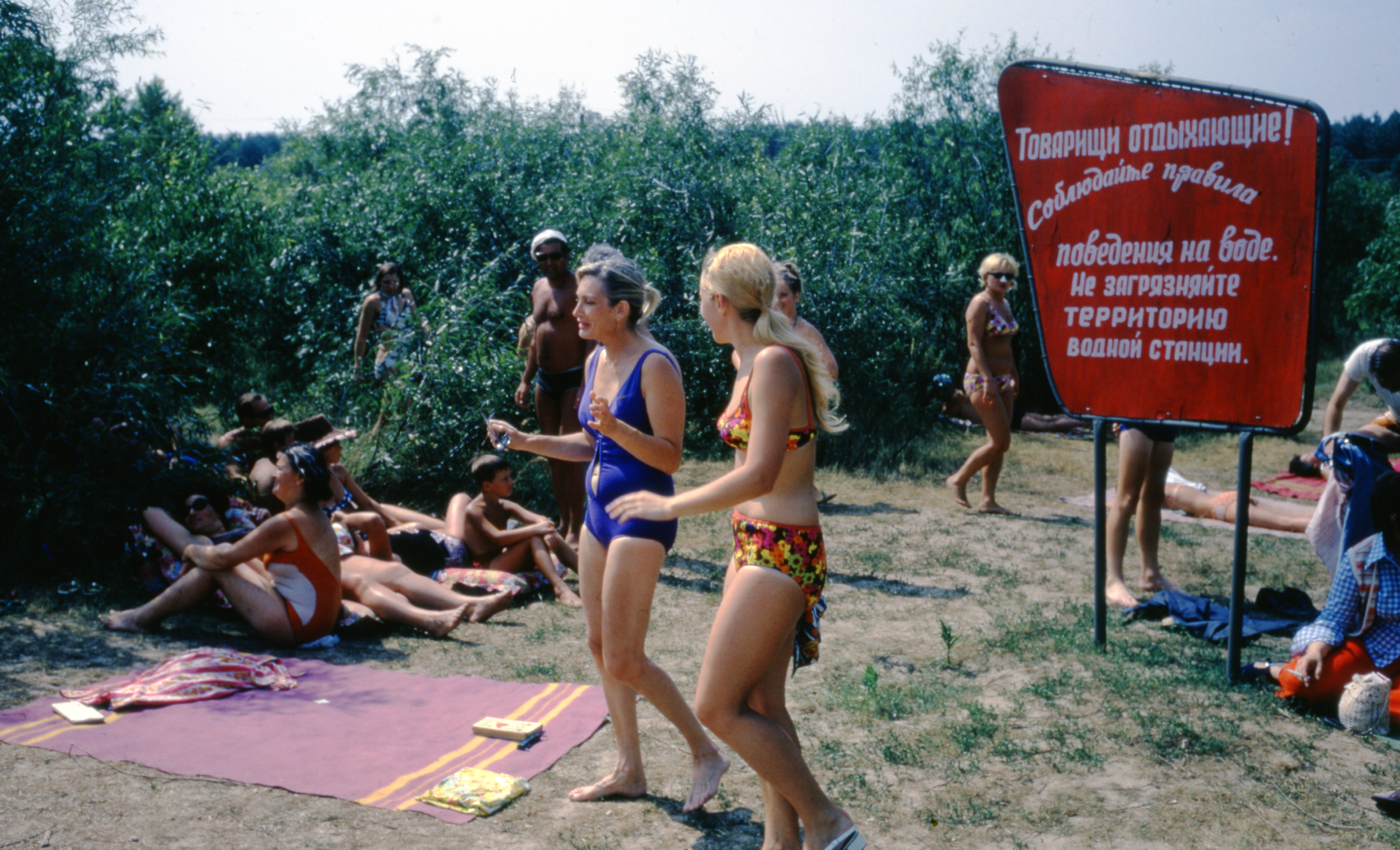
A Russian-language inscription on a public beach in Kyiv, mid-1970s

In the course of the 1970s and 1980s, Russification gathered speed in Ukraine. This led not only to a dramatic increase in the use of Russian at work and educational institutions in large urban centres but also to a decline of national consciousness among Ukrainians as measured by identity with a mother tongue. The number of ethnic Ukrainians who gave Russian as their mother tongue increased from 6% in 1959 to 10% in 1979 and 16% in 1989. The proportion of children being taught in Ukrainian in schools of the Ukrainian SSR decreased from 60,4% in 1970-1971 to 57,8% in 1976-1977, meanwhile the percentage of pupils receiving education in Russian grew from 38,8% to 41,3% during the same period. As of 1974, 51 out of 54 schools in Voroshylovhrad (Luhansk), 80 out of 99 in Zaporizhzhia, 139 out of 144 in Kharkiv and 106 out of 222 in Kyiv had Russian as the language of instruction. In cities like Zhdanov, Makiivka and Rubizhne all schools taught in Russian language.

By the 1970s, only a small minority of Russians, between 2 and 8 percent, insisted on endogamous marriages. However, those that told the pollsters they were willing to marry outside their ethnic group expected marriage to entail the linguistic and cultural Russification of their non-Russian spouse, not the other way around.

Due to the regime turning the Russians into the "most Soviet nation" they had to give up many elements of their pre-revolutionary identity such as monarchism and religion. The recovery and preservation of non-Soviet Russian identity was championed by Aleksandr Solzhenitsyn and other Russian authors who wrote "village prose" and idealised the Russian village. As the development of Russian identity had been interrupted by the Soviet Union, the new Russian nationalist thinkers reverted to and defined Russian nationalism in the spirit of Russian imperial nationhood, not limited to Russians but also Ukrainians. However, Russian nationalists felt more confident given the spread of the Russian language during the Soviet Union.

In officially sanctioned texts, references to the population of Kyivan Rus as Russians, or old Russians, were commonplace while Ukrainian territories were often referred to as southern or western Russian lands. The lack of distinct terms in the Russian language to differentiate between Russians and the Rus' or Ruthenian people disguised reversions to imperial discourse. Vladimir Osipov's journal Veche published in the early 1970s in print runs of fifty to one hundred copies, professed their authors' belief in the "unity of Eastern Slavs" whom he simply called Russians.

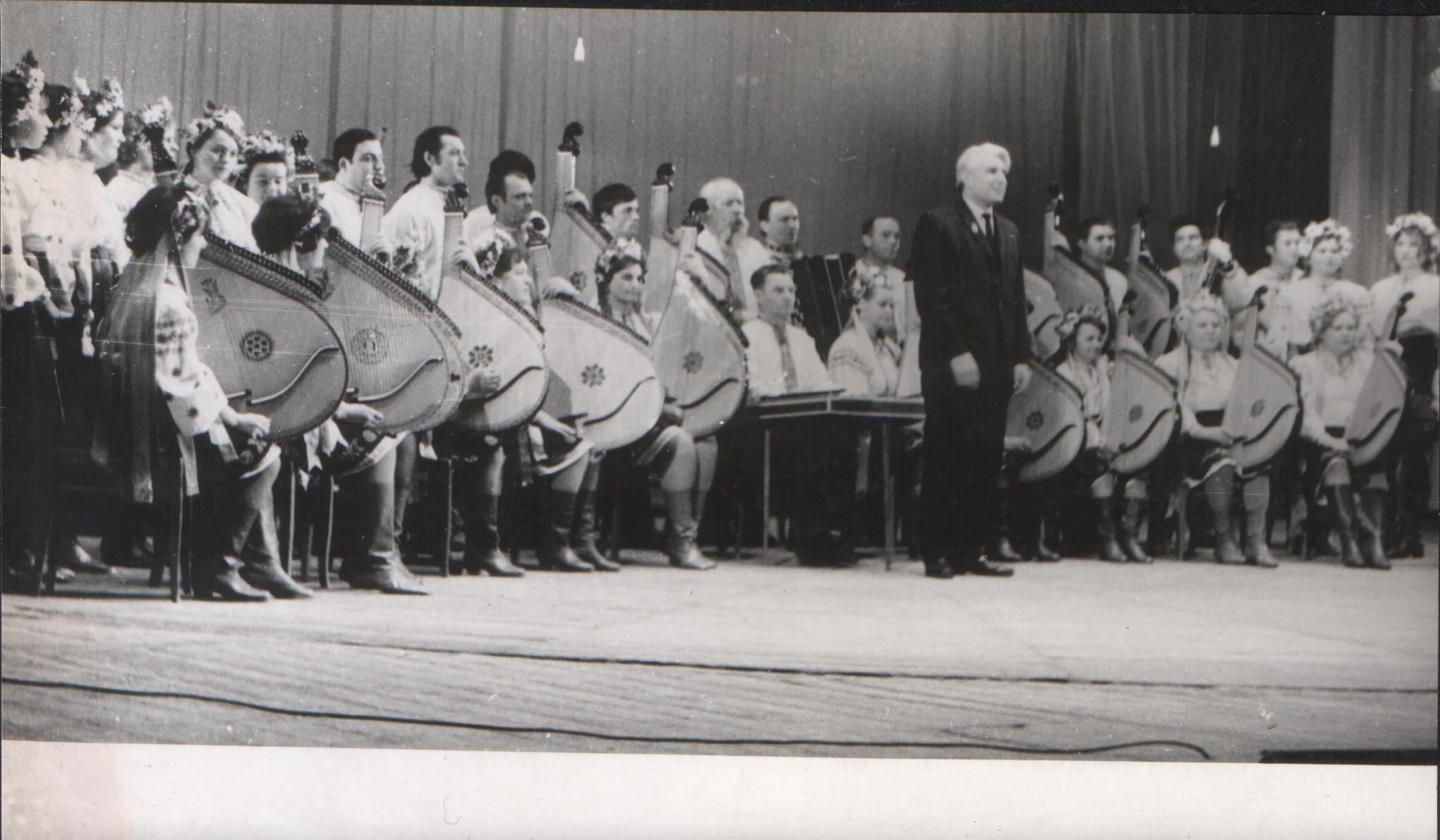
A performance by the Folk and Popular Music Orchestra of the Ukrainian Radio in 1974

An element of Soviet policies in respect to Ukrainian culture was the transformation and exoticization of Ukrainian folklore tradition. This led to the emergence of sharovarshchyna, a trend in Soviet popular culture, which promoted stereotypical depictions of Ukrainians and became especially widespread during the 1970s and 1980s. At the same time, as part of the policy of cultural unification spearheaded by Soviet authorities, authentic Ukrainian culture was persecuted. Folk choirs were discouraged from performing songs of their native regions, and spontaneous folk singing in rural areas such as Poltavshchyna was punished with fines, which led to the extinction of authentic musical tradition in the region by the early 1980s.

As part of Soviet anti-religious campaigns, starting from early 1960s a number of new feasts were introduced by Soviet authorities. In 1971 a conference dedicated to "new Soviet holidays" took place in Kyiv. Religious and traditional celebrations were replaced with artificially constructed festivals officially approved by authorities: singers of traditional koliadkas were persecuted, and Christmas was substituted with the New Year. The Russian tradition of Maslenitsa replaced the native Ukrainian customs, celebrations of Easter were replaced with a "Feast of the Spring" and Spas with the "Harvest Holiday". It was even proposed to replace the Ivana Kupala with "Neptune Day". Patron feasts in cities and villages were replaced with secular celebrations of "City/Village Day". Russification and doctrines of state atheism even led to the elimination of a number of Ukrainian fairy tales from publications.

In his 1978 article Ivan Lysiak-Rudnytskyi stated, that Ukraine under the Soviet rule represented the revival of the idea of "Little Russia". According to him, the ruling regime attempted to unite the country with Moscow by imposing on it a common "high culture". This process did not require the total loss of Ukrainians' ethnic identity, as in the view of Soviet state planners it could remain a regional variety of the common imperial complex. This approach explained the promotion of a folklorized version of Ukrainian folk culture by Soviet authorities.

In response to the growing cultural Russification of Ukraine and deprivation of human rights, the Ukrainian Helsinki Group was formed in 1976. The group was inspired by the Helsinki Accords of 1975 and argued for Ukrainian cultural and political equality with Russia. A document adopted by the group in February 1977 reads, "We profoundly respect the culture, spirituality, and ideals of the Russian people, but why should Moscow make decisions for us at international forums on various problems, commitments, and the like?! Why should Ukraine's cultural, creative, scientific, agricultural and international problems be defined and planned in the capital of a neighbouring state?". The angered government opposed the activities of the Ukrainian Helsinki Group, with many of its founding members being formally imprisoned in the Gulag system.

By the early 1980s, the time by which Khruschchev had promised communism would be achieved, the Soviet Union still had not reached it, however the formation of a single political nation, the Soviet people, had made progress in the expansion of Russian language. Between 1970 and 1989, the number of non-Russians claiming a good working knowledge of Russian increased from 42 million to 69 million. The increase in the number of Russian speakers was disproportionately centred on Ukraine. Almost all of the 75 million of the 290 million Soviet citizens who did not claim proficiency in Russian lived outside the East Slavic core of the Union.

=== Mikhail Gorbachev and fall of Communism ===
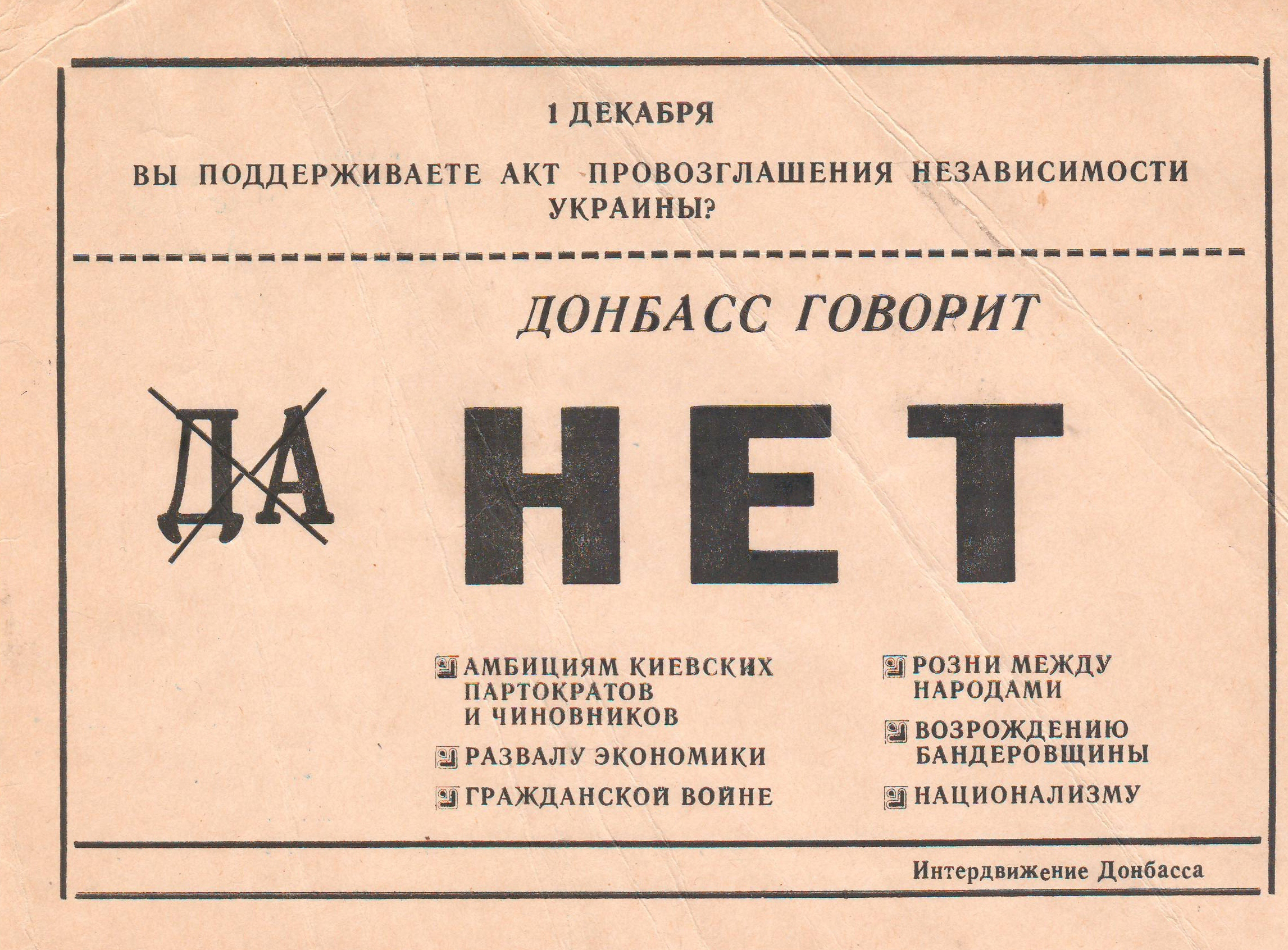
Anti-independence leaflet issued by the International Movement of Donbass during the 1991 Ukrainian referendum

By the late 1980s the majority of Ukrainian children was for the first time instructed in Russian: between 1950 and 1989, the proportion of the schoolchildren being taught in Ukrainian in Soviet Ukraine had decreased from 81% to 48%. As of 1987, 73,7% of schools in Ukrainian SSR's regional centres had Russian as the language of instruction. In Kyiv, only 34 out of 274 schools taught in Ukrainian, compared to 9 out of 140 in Dnipropetrovsk, 3 out of 100 in Odesa and 2 out of 161 in Kharkiv. Lviv remained the only big city where Ukrainian remained the language of instruction in the majority of schools (66 out of 103).

After the beginning of Perestroika, in 1988 an orthographic commission was organized by the Academy of Sciences of Ukrainian SSR. Its work resulted in the modification of orthography, which was adopted in 1990 to restore some elements of Ukrainian spelling and grammar, which had been removed in the process of Russification.

During the collapse of the USSR, with the support of local Communist Party committees, Moscow struck back against independence movements and began mobilizing ethnic Russians and Russian speakers in support of the Soviet Union. Those who felt threatened by the revival of local languages, the Russian-speaking populations of the region, supported the Moscow-backed political organisations, for example the International Front in Latvia and the International Movement in Estonia, whose task was to counterattack the popular fronts created by the respective nationalities. In Ukraine this policy was represented by the International Movement of Donbass.

== Independent Ukraine ==
=== 1990s ===
On 24 August 1991, Ukraine declared its independence from the Soviet Union. In response, Boris Yeltsin threatened Ukraine with Russian claims on parts of their territory and a revision of their mutual borders if the Ukrainian side insisted on independence. Furthermore, a high-profile delegation was dispatched to address the leaders of the now independent Ukraine. Anatolii Sobchak, a member of the delegation, was booed by protesters in Kyiv when he tried to talk about Russo-Ukrainian unity.

On 8 December 1991, Yeltsin along with the other delegates dissolved the Gorbachev-led Soviet Union and created what he believed would be the Yeltsin-led Commonwealth of Independent States. It was an attempt to put together a confederation in which Russia would again play the key role, however without picking up the all-Union bill. Yeltsin suggested the idea of Commonwealth citizenship. However, it was rejected by Ukraine and other post-Soviet republics who did not approve of the plan.

One of the contenders who competed for power with Yeltsin in post-Soviet Russia was the mayor of Moscow, Yurii Luzhkov, who actively played the Russian nationalist card against Yeltsin. Luzhkov portrayed himself as a defender of Russians abroad during his highly publicised visits to Sevastopol. There, he funded a number of Russian social and cultural projects and opened a branch of Moscow University.

Another contender for power in post-Soviet Russia was Yevgenii Primakov, who championed the reintegration of the post-Soviet space, including Ukraine, under Russian political control. During his term as Russian foreign minister in 1996-1998, he turned Russian foreign policy away from its western orientation, seeking the enhancement of Russia's status in the "near abroad", the term used in Moscow to describe former Soviet republics. In 1996, Yeltsin appealed to intellectuals to find a new Russian national idea. Most responded with suggestions for basing the new Russian identity on statehood. However, the Russian Communist party tried to keep the all-Union deity of the Russian alive, enforced by an attachment to eastern Slavic unity and Orthodoxy. Radical nationalists advocated a racially pure Russian nation that would not include non-Russian citizens.

In 1996, the demographer Vladimir Kabuzan published a study of settlements of Russians and Russian speakers outside Russia. He included eastern and southern Ukraine, northern Kazakhstan, and parts of Estonia and Latvia. Kabuzan wanted those territories to be attached to Russia and argued in favour of not only freeing Chechnya, but also of forging a Russian nation-state based on cultural grounds. The image presented by Kabuzan was of a new ethnic and cultural Russian entity.

In 1999 a project to replace the Soviet-imposed orthography of Ukrainian language based by restoring the norms of the "Kharkiv orthography" of 1928 was proposed by a commission led by Vasyl Nimchuk. However, the reform was abandoned due to opposition from the Ukrainian society.

=== 2000s ===
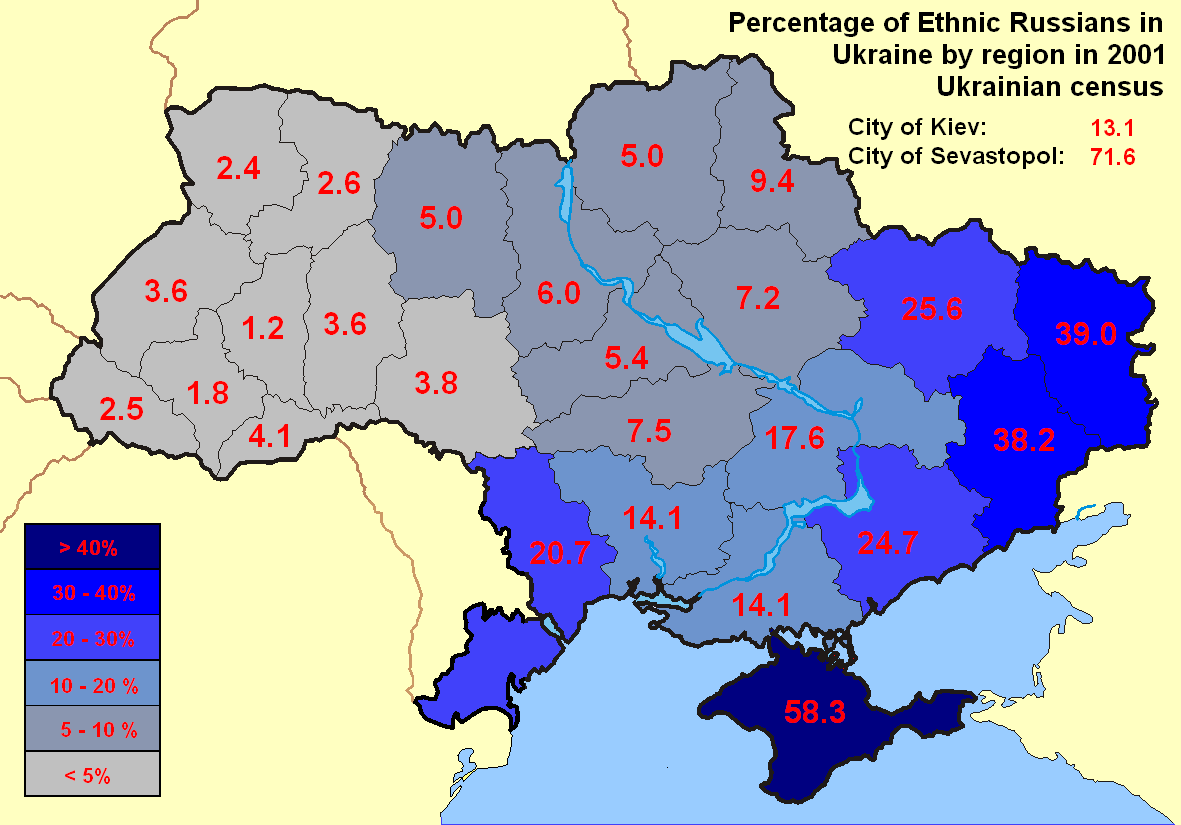
Ethnic Russians by region (Census 2001)

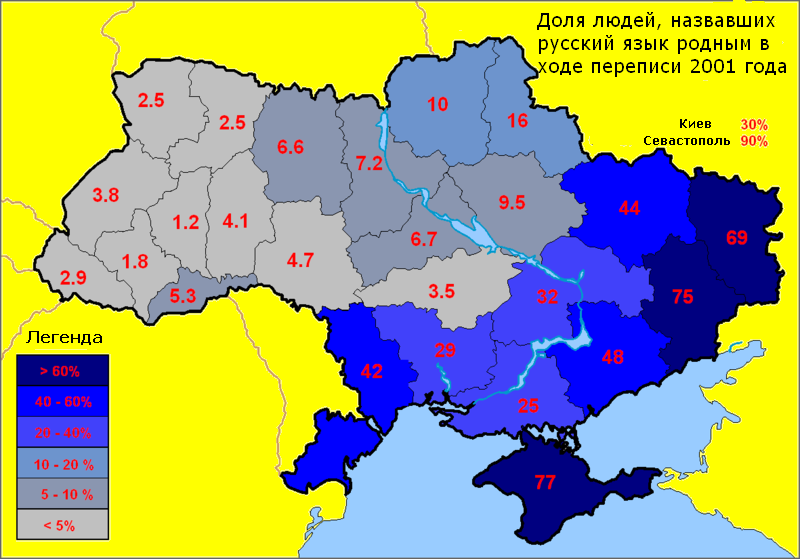
Inhabitants with Russian as mother tongue by region (Census 2001)

Compared to other states formerly part of the Soviet Union, Ukraine and its language were the most heavily affected by Russification policies. Outside of Russia, Ukraine has the largest group of Russian speakers who are not ethnically Russian. Russian speakers were more prevalent in the southern and eastern half of the country, while Ukrainian was more commonly used in central Ukraine, excluding bigger cities, like Kyiv or Poltava. In the western parts of the country, Russian speakers and/or ethnic Russians were almost non-existent. As of 2009, there were about 5.5 million Ukrainians whose first language was Russian. Some of those "russified Ukrainians" spoke Russian, while others used a Ukrainian–Russian pidgin language commonly known as "surzhyk". Some view the latter as a great issue, as the mixing of languages can lead to communication issues due to the lack of common rules. Furthermore, such distorted language is alleged to "dull a person, [making] his thinking primitive". Numeral estimates of "russified Ukrainians" vary, but according to some studies, during late 2000s they comprised a third to a half of Ukraine's total population.

Generally, Ukrainian dominates in rural areas; even in eastern Ukraine, Ukrainian is common in villages, where it's considered to be the only "clean" Ukrainian, lacking influence from other languages. However, the only part of Ukraine where Ukrainian completely dominates and Russian is rare to hear, is western Ukraine, especially Galicia, which was historically ruled by Russia for a much shorter time than the rest of the country: Volhynia became a part of the Russian Empire for the first time around the 1800s, while Galicia, Bukovina and Zakarpattia fully became a part of the Soviet Union for the first time only in 1945, after WW2.

=== 2010s and early 2020s ===
In post-Soviet Ukraine, Ukrainian remains the only official language in the country; however, in 2012, President Viktor Yanukovych introduced a bill recognizing "regional languages", according to which, in particular, Russian could be used officially in the predominantly Russian-speaking areas of Ukraine, in schools, courts, and government institutions. While the bill was supported by Ukrainians in the eastern and southern regions, the legislation triggered protests in Kyiv, where representatives from opposition parties argued that it would further divide the Ukrainian-speaking and Russian-speaking parts of the country and make Russian a de facto official language there. On 28 February 2018, the Constitutional Court of Ukraine ruled this legislation unconstitutional.

Television and other media have tried to cater to speakers of both languages. In 2019 a new standard of Ukrainian orthography was approved, restoring part of the norms from the orthography of 1928 but also preserving some rules introduced as part of the Soviet Union's Russification policies.

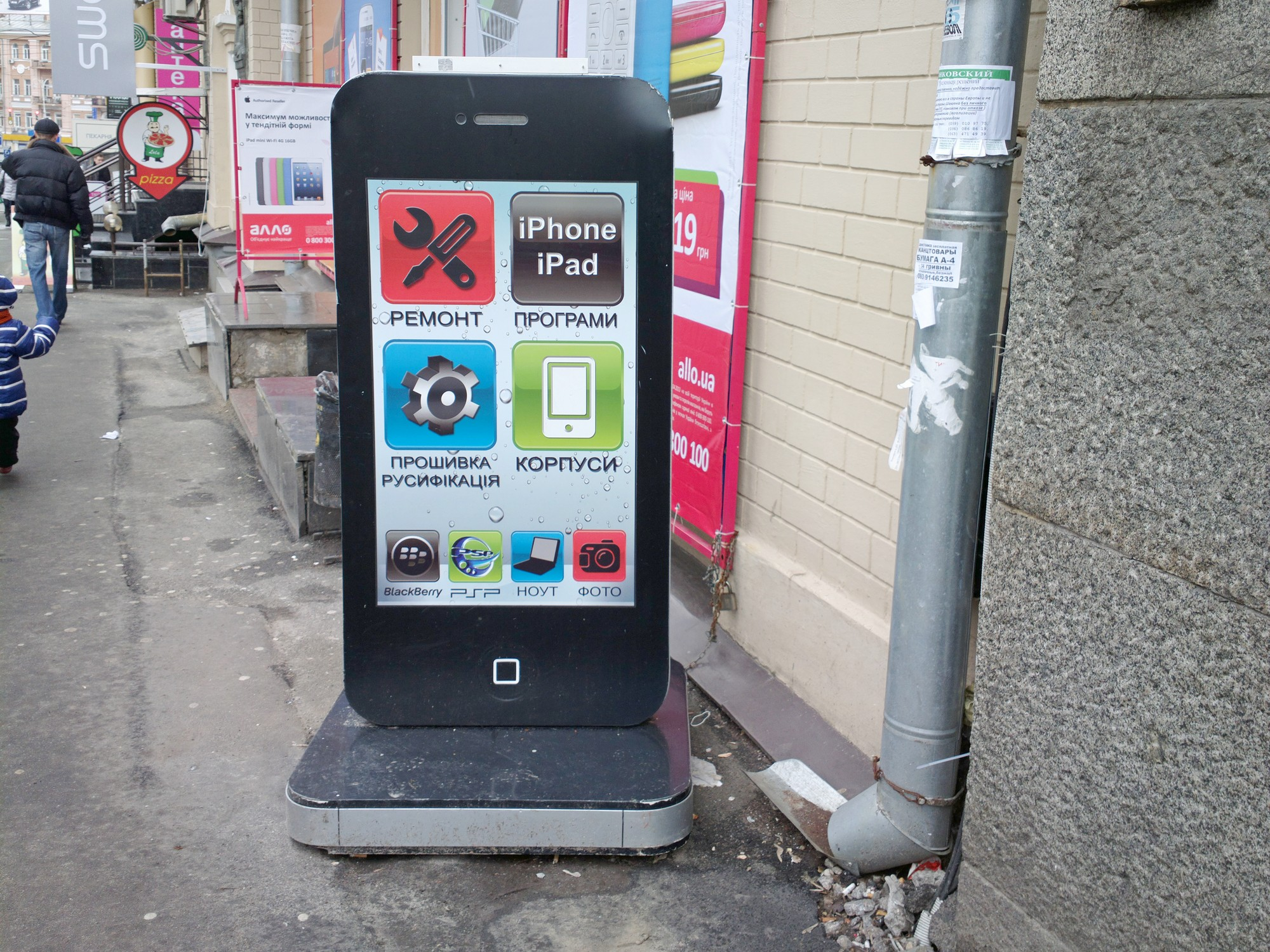
A Ukrainian-language advertisement offering "Russification" of mobile phones in Obukhiv, 2013

Despite its official status, as well as some protectionist measures introduced by the government, after thirty years of Ukraine's independence there were still numerous cases of Ukrainian speakers being stigmatized and even physically attacked for using their native language. Ukraine's officials and businesses were known to frequently ignore the prescriptions to use the state language in their work, and many schools located in urban centres were described as being Ukrainian on paper only (so-called "Potemkin Ukrainization"), with cases of Russophone state employees using slurs or even attacking Ukrainophone citizens being documented. According to surveys, in Ukraine's urban centres beyond Western Ukraine more people spoke Ukrainian at home than in public, which was caused by the legacy of public humiliation and mocking by Russian speakers. Many Ukrainians who did not speak Ukrainian in daily life still recognized it as their native language, which could be interpreted as a demonstration of their wish for the more frequent use of the language, which they were unable to realize due to the hostile social environment and historical legacy of linguistic suppression.

The situation was exacerbated by the economic discrepancy between the poorer province, which was mostly Ukrainian-speaking, and richer urban centres, whose population, especially the social elite, tended to be Russified. The prevalence of Russian language among Ukraine's dominating classes was demonstrated by the fact that none of Ukraine's richest oligarchs and very few among the country's political leadership were known to use Ukrainian in private informal communication. For instance, covert records of talks between Ukrainian presidents and officials, such as the "Melnychenko tapes", demonstrated, that the predominant majority of such conversations was carried out in Russian, to a large degree influenced by criminal slang. This contrast of private conduct with officially declared policies could be seen as a sign of opportunism of the Ukrainian political elite.

=== Russo-Ukrainian War ===
After the 2014 Russian annexation of Crimea and establishment of unrecognized Russian-supported militants in eastern Ukraine, Russification was imposed on people in Russian-occupied territories. Tensions between the two nations skyrocketed between 2021 and 2022, when the Russian Armed Forces initiated a large military build-up along its border with Ukraine. On 21 February 2022, Russia recognized the Donetsk People's Republic and the Luhansk People's Republic, the two self-proclaimed breakaway states in Ukraine's Donbas region, controlled by pro-Russian separatists. Then on 24 February 2022, Russia unleashed a full-scale invasion against Ukraine. During the full-scale invasion, as many as 300,000 Ukrainian children are believed to have been abducted and forcibly resettled in remote regions of Russia and adopted into Russian families in order to become Russified. On the occupied territories, Russia has been pursuing "relentless Russification policy" by enforcing expulsion, deportations and repressions towards residents who refused to accept Russian passport, and denial of pensions and healthcare services to these residents. While Russian authorities spend significant resources on "reeducation" of children forcibly deported from Ukraine through a network of newly created FTs RPSP agencies (Federal Center for the Development of Teenage Socialization Programs), Russian security services at the same time perceive them as a potential threat, an untrusted and potentially disloyal element who "might start to resist". Additional resources have been assigned to surveillance and monitoring of youth on the occupied territories, assigning individuals with an "opposition score" and "destructiveness score".

In 2025, Russia began banning the Ukrainian language in the occupied territories of Ukraine.

The Russo-Ukrainian War led to the delegitimization of Russian identity in Ukraine, but at the same time, paradoxically, contributed to the promotion of a local "Ukrainian Russianness", expressed through loyalty of Russian speakers to the Ukrainian state and Ukraine as a country. In a significant turn, many members of the largest "pro-Russian" political party, Opposition Platform - For Life, led local resistance to the invaders, and the Ukrainian Orthodox Church of Moscow Patriarchate condemned the invasion and distanced itself from its spiritual leadership in Moscow.

== See also ==
- Derussification in Ukraine
- Internationalism or Russification?
- Russophone Ukrainians
- History of Ukraine
- Chronology of Ukrainian language suppression
- Russification of Belarus
- Russification of Finland
- Law of Ukraine "On protecting the functioning of the Ukrainian language as the State language"
