= Language policy in Ukraine =

Laws of Ukraine regarding language

The language policy in Ukraine is based on the constitution of Ukraine, international treaties and domestic legislation. According to article 10 of the constitution, Ukrainian is the official language of Ukraine, and the state shall ensure the comprehensive development and functioning of the Ukrainian language in all spheres of social life throughout the entire territory of the country. Some minority languages (such as Russian and Belarusian) have more limited protection and are subject to restrictions on some forms of public use.

The 2012 law On the Principles of State Language Policy granted regional language status to Russian and other minority languages. It allowed the use of minority languages in courts, schools and other government institutions in areas of Ukraine where the national minorities exceed 10% of the population. The 2012 law was supported by the governing Party of Regions and opposed by the opposition parties, who argued that the law undermined the role of the Ukrainian language, violated Article 10 of the Constitution, and was adopted with an irregular procedure. Immediately after the 2014 Ukrainian revolution, on 23 February 2014, the Ukrainian Parliament voted to repeal the law. This decision was vetoed by the acting President Turchynov. In October 2014, the Constitutional Court started reviewing the constitutionality of the 2012 law and declared it unconstitutional on 28 February 2018.

In April 2019, the Ukrainian parliament adopted a new law, the law On supporting the functioning of the Ukrainian language as the State language. The law made the use of Ukrainian compulsory (totally or within quotas) in more than 30 spheres of public life, including public administration, electoral process, education, science, culture, media, economic and social life, health and care institutions, and activities of political parties. The law did not regulate private communication. In consumer services, Ukrainian is the default language, although at the customer's request individual service may be provided in another language acceptable to both parties. Some exemptions were provided for the official languages of the European Union and for minority languages, with the exclusion of Russian, Belarusian and Yiddish. The Venice Commission and Human Rights Watch expressed concern about the 2019 law's failure to protect the language rights of Ukrainian minorities. On 8 December 2023, the Ukrainian parliament passed amendments to legislation on national minorities as part of meeting one of the European Commission's criteria for the opening of Ukrainian European Union membership negotiations.

Following the Russian invasion of Ukraine, on 19 June 2022 the Ukrainian parliament passed two laws which placed restrictions on Russian books and music. The new laws ban Russian citizens from printing books unless they take Ukrainian citizenship, prohibit the import of books printed in Russia, Belarus and the occupied Ukrainian territories, and prohibit the reproduction in the media and public transport of music performed or created by post-1991 Russian citizens, unless the musicians are included in a "white list" of artists who have publicly condemned Russian aggression against Ukraine.

Beginning in 2023, some local authorities adopted additional moratoria on the public use of Russian-language cultural products. On 13 July 2023, the Kyiv City Council introduced such a moratorium in Kyiv, covering Russian-language cultural products including books, music and audiovisual works. Similar measures were subsequently adopted in some other Ukrainian cities. In 2026, the Odesa City Council considered a similar proposal that would apply to Russian-language music, films, theatrical performances and literature in public spaces, municipal cultural and educational institutions, municipal enterprises and public transport. Private businesses would be recommended, but not required, to refrain from such content, and private communication in Russian would not be affected. Unlike the 2022 national restriction on music, which primarily applies to works created or performed by citizens of Russia, the proposed Odesa measure is based on the Russian-language character of the cultural product and would therefore also cover Russian-language works by Ukrainian creators or performers.

In June 2023, president Zelenskyy introduced bill No. 9432 on the use of English as one of Ukraine's languages for international communication. The bill was adopted as Law No. 3760-IX on 4 June 2024. The law establishes English as one of the languages of international communication in Ukraine and provides for its use in specified public spheres, including public administration, education, culture, transport and health care.

In December 2025, the Ukrainian parliament amended the legislation through which Ukraine implements the European Charter for Regional or Minority Languages. Under Law No. 4699-IX, which entered into force on 13 June 2026, Ukraine applies the Charter to eighteen listed languages; Russian is no longer included among them.

== History ==
Percentage of native speakers of Russian from the 2001 census. Russian was a regional language in 13 regions (shaded) with 10% or higher before the repeal of the 2012 languages law.

Since the fall of the Soviet Union and the independence of Ukraine, the Russian language has dwindled. In 2001 it remained one of the two most used languages for business, legal proceedings, science, artistry, and many other spheres of everyday life. According to the 2001 census, 67.5% of the citizens of Ukraine regarded Ukrainian as their native language, with Russian being considered the native language for another 29.6%. Various other languages constituted the remaining 2.9%.

=== Soviet era ===
During the Soviet era, the status of Ukrainian was legally codified in 1922, when Ukrainian and Russian were declared to be of "national significance" and schools were allowed to use them both in teaching; they were never adopted as official languages of Soviet Ukraine but had formally equal status as "generally used languages". In practice, however, Ukrainian was mainly a rural language and had lower prestige than Russian, which was the language of the educated urban society. After an initial phase of official commitment to Ukrainization in the 1920s and early 1930s under the Korenizatsiia policy, the Soviet era was marked by an increasing trend toward Russification. In 1938 the study of Russian was made obligatory and in 1958 the study of the mother-tongue was made optional. From 1959 to 1989, on average 60-70% of the population spoke Ukrainian and 20% spoke Russian; Yiddish was also widely spoken by the decreasing Jewish population (from 14% in 1959 to 3.9% in 1989).

=== 1989 law On Languages in the Ukrainian SSR ===
On 28 October 1989, the Supreme Soviet of the Ukrainian SSR adopted the Law "On Languages in the Ukrainian SSR". The Ukrainian language was declared the only official language, while the other languages spoken in Ukraine were guaranteed constitutional protection. The government was obliged to create the conditions required for the development and use of Ukrainian language as well as languages of other ethnic groups, including Russian. Usage of other languages, along with Ukrainian, was allowed in local institutions located in places of residence of the majority of citizens of the corresponding ethnicities. Citizens were guaranteed the right to use their native or any other languages and were entitled to address various institutions and organisations in Ukrainian, in Russian, or in another language of their work, or in a language acceptable to the parties.

The adoption of the "Law on Languages" preceded the Declaration of Independence of Ukraine (24 August 1991) by almost two years. The Ukrainian SSR was still part of the Soviet Union, and its parliament still dominated by the Communist Party of Ukraine. After the dissolution of the Soviet Union in December 1991, the law, with some minor amendments, remained in force in the independent Ukrainian state. Ever since, there have been discussions on the potential adoption of Russian as a co-official language alongside Ukrainian, particularly raising debates during presidential and parliamentary election campaigns. Leonid Kuchma had made raising the status of Russian one of his 1994 electoral promises, but did not deliver it during his presidency.

== Ukrainian Constitution ==
The Constitution of Ukraine, adopted by the Verkhovna Rada on 28 June 1996, states at article 10: "The state language of Ukraine is the Ukrainian language. The State ensures the comprehensive development and functioning of the Ukrainian language in all spheres of social life throughout the entire territory of Ukraine. In Ukraine, the free development, use and protection of Russian, and other languages of national minorities of Ukraine, is guaranteed".

== 2012 Law "On the Principles of State Language Policy" ==
On 7 February 2012 members of the Verkhovna Rada Serhii Kivalov and Vadym Kolesnychenko (both from the Party of Regions) entered a bill (commonly called "Kolesnychenko-Kivalov language bill"), that would have given the status of regional language to Russian and other minority languages. It allowed the use of minority languages in courts, schools and other government institutions in areas of Ukraine where the national minorities exceed 10% of the population.

Supporters of the 2012 bill argued it would have made life easier for Russian-speaking Ukrainians. Opponents feared that the adoption of Russian as a minority language could have spread rapidly, challenging Ukrainian and causing splits between eastern and western Ukraine. In practice Russian at the time was already used widely in official establishments in Ukraine.

Kolesnychenko-Kivalov language law

Verkhovna Rada
- Long title: On the principles of the state language policy
- Signed by: Viktor Yanukovych
- Signed: 8 August 2012
- Effective: 10 August 2012

Legislative history
- Bill title: Bill n. 9073, "On the principles of the state language policy"
- Introduced by: Kolesnychenko and Kivalov
- First reading: 5 June 2012
- Second reading: 3 July 2012

Repeals
- 28 February 2018
- Status: Repealed

In May 2012 Vadym Kolesnychenko, one of the authors of the 2012 language law, claimed that the law was supported by several higher education bodies, scientists and NGOs. On 9 February 2013, Russian president Vladimir Putin awarded him and another author of the language law, Serhiy Kivalov, with the Medal of Pushkin for their "great contribution to the preservation and promotion of the Russian language and culture abroad".

Some say that the bill contradicts the Constitution of Ukraine, violates the Budget Code, and aims to annihilate the Ukrainian language. It suffered a criticism in the conclusions of state authorities and their departments: the Main Scientific-Expert Bureau of the Ukrainian Parliament (23 May 2012), the Parliamentary Committee on Culture and Spirituality (23 September 2011), the Parliamentary Committee on Budget (3 November 2011), Ministry of Finance (9 September 2011), the Ministry of Justice (27 September 2011). The bill also failed to obtain the support of the specialized institutions of the National Academy of Sciences of Ukraine: the Linguistics Institute, the Institute of the Ukrainian Language, the Institute of political and ethno-national researches, the Shevchenko Institute of Literature, the Institute of State and Law, the Ukrainian linguistic-informational Fund, the Philology Institute of Kyiv University, and the Academy of Sciences of the High School of Ukraine.

=== Opinion adopted by the Venice Commission ===
In December 2011, the Venice Commission of the Council of Europe issued an opinion on the draft law questioning whether the parallel use of Ukrainian and Russian was in compliance with article 10 of the Constitution: "the question remains whether [...] there are sufficient guarantees, in the current Draft Law, for the consolidation of the Ukrainian language as the sole State language, and of the role it has to play in the Ukrainian multilinguistic society".

Ukrayinska Pravda reported that the Venice Commission did not find in the draft law enough guarantees for the protection of the Ukrainian language, and that the commission had come to the conclusion that the proposed law was just "another tool of the election campaign" for the Party of Regions. Kolesnychenko, one of the authors of the law, claimed that the Opinion was "generally supportive", but the opponents noted that it contained strong criticism about the failure to protect the role of Ukrainian as the State language.

=== Fight in parliament ===
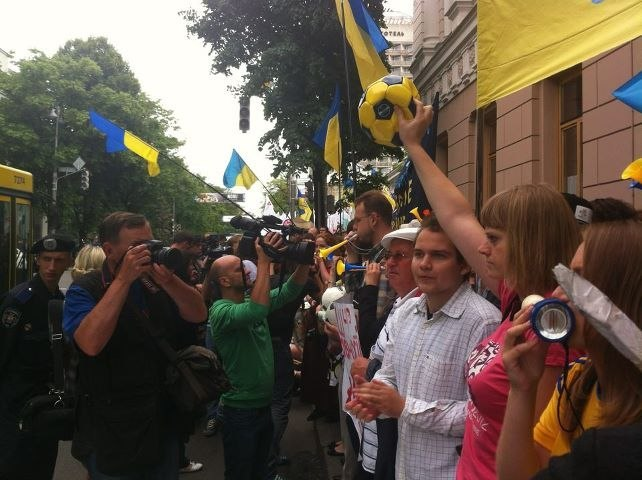
Activists protesting the adoption of the law on 24 May 2012

Prior to 24 May 2012, there were rumors that a revision of the legislation on languages would take place in parliament (the Verkhovna Rada) and that the Secretary of National Security and Defense would attend the session. Some 1,000 protesters gathered just outside the Verkhovna Rada building setting up another tent city. State law enforcement warned the protesters not to establish a tent city.

At the evening session, the parliamentary opposition in the Verkhovna Rada (Yulia Tymoshenko Bloc and Our Ukraine-People's Self-Defense Bloc) blocked the main tribune in parliament as some representatives from the Party of Regions surrounded the presidium. The speaker was forced to announce a break in the session. After the break, Member of Parliament Vyacheslav Kyrylenko read a statement of the united opposition not to conduct any hearings regarding language issues. After the law draft #10154 "On the state language of Ukraine" was not adopted onto the daily agenda, Kyrylenko withdrew his draft #9059 "Prohibition of narrowing the sphere of use of Ukrainian language" from a revision, while Kolesnychenko gave a presentation on his draft #9073. The head of the Committee On Issues of Culture and Spirituality Volodymyr Yavorivsky disclosed the decision of the committee to reject the bill #9073 as it was the decision of the committee's majority. He pointed to the fact that the law draft in fact will introduce a bilingual situation in a number of regions. However, after a review, the bill was supported by the parliamentary majority which showed its support in adopting two state languages: Ukrainian and Russian. The parliamentary minority and the deputy group "Reforms for the Future" stayed in opposition to the bill. Parliament speaker Volodymyr Lytvyn was forced to hastily close the session as further discussion descended into another fight leaving some members of parliament injured.

The Party of Regions released a statement to the press where it accused the opposition of impeding the enactment of a bill that protects some constitutional rights of millions of citizens of Ukraine. PoR leader in parliament Yefremov promised to revisit the issue once everything is stable.

=== Implementation ===
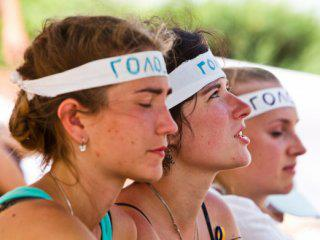
Participants of a hunger strike against the law in July 2012

The bill was eventually adopted by the Verkhovna Rada on second reading on 3 July 2012; it was supported by the Party of Regions, the Communist Party of Ukraine and the Lytvyn Bloc, while it was strongly opposed by the Yulia Tymoshenko Bloc and the Our Ukraine-People's Self-Defence Bloc. The bill was to come into force only after it was signed by Ukrainian president Viktor Yanukovych and the chairman of Parliament. But the chairman of Parliament Volodymyr Lytvyn tendered his resignation on 4 July 2012. However, the Verkhovna Rada twice held votes of confidence in the speaker, and did not accept his resignation. On 31 July, Lytvyn signed the law. The bill was signed by President Yanukovych on 8 August 2012. The law came into force on 10 August 2012.

Since then, various Ukrainian cities and regions have declared Russian a regional language in their jurisdictions, these being the municipalities of Odesa, Kharkiv, Kherson, Mykolaiv, Zaporizhia, Sevastopol, Dnipropetrovsk, Luhansk and Krasny Luch; and the oblasts of Odesa, Zaporizhia, Donetsk, Kherson, Mykolaiv and Dnipropetrovsk. Hungarian has been made a regional language in the town of Berehove (Hungarian: Beregszász) in the Zakarpattia Oblast, "Moldovan" in the village of Tarasivtsi (Romanian: Tărăsăuți) in the Chernivtsi Oblast, and Romanian in the village of Bila Tserkva (Romanian: Biserica Albă) also in the Zakarpattia Oblast. From then on, those languages could be used in city/Oblast administrative office work and documents. As of September 2012 there were no plans for such bilingualism in Kyiv. Chairman of the Supreme Council of Crimea Volodomyr Konstantinov stated in March 2013 that the August 2012 law had changed nothing in Crimea.

=== Attempted repeal of the law ===
On 23 February 2014, the second day after the flight of Viktor Yanukovich, while in a parliamentary session, a deputy from the Batkivshchyna party, Vyacheslav Kyrylenko, moved to include in the agenda a bill to repeal the 2012 law "On the principles of the state language policy". The motion was carried with 86% of the votes in favour—232 deputies in favour vs 37 opposed against the required minimum of 226 of 334 votes. The bill was included in the agenda, immediately put to a vote with no debate and approved with the same 232 voting in favour. The bill would have made Ukrainian the sole state language at all levels. Still, all the minority languages (including Russian) remain explicitly protected under article 10 of the Ukrainian Constitution. The repeal would also bring back into force the previous law on languages, which was in place in Ukraine for 23 years before July 2012 and was regulating the use of the minority languages.

However, the move to repeal the 2012 law "On the principles of the state language policy" provoked negative reactions in Crimea and in some regions of Southern and Eastern Ukraine. It became one of the topics of the protests against the new government approved by the parliament after the flight of Viktor Yanukovich.

Passage of the repeal bill was met with regret by the Secretary-General of the Council of Europe. The OSCE High Commissioner on National Minorities expressed concern over possible further unrest. He also proposed to give advice and facilitate discussions on new legislation, declaring that "we must avoid the mistakes made last time [in 2012] when unbalanced legislation was adopted without a proper dialogue in the Verkhovna Rada." The bill was also criticized by the Ambassador for Human Rights of the Russian foreign ministry. Bulgarian and Romanian foreign ministers evaluated it as a step in the wrong direction, and the Greek foreign minister expressed disappointment. The Hungarian foreign ministry expressed serious concerns, noting that the decision "could question the commitment of the new Ukrainian administration towards democracy". The Polish foreign minister called it a mistake. According to Uilleam Blacker writing for openDemocracy, the repeal bill contained no specific threat to the Russian language.

After urgently ordering a working group to draft a replacement law on February 27, acting President Oleksandr Turchynov declared on 3 March that he will not sign the repeal bill until a replacement law is adopted to "accommodate the interests of both eastern and western Ukraine and of all ethnic groups and minorities". Since then the repeal bill has not been signed nor vetoed by the President, and its status has long remained "ready for sign".

On 7 April 2014, Batkivshchyna leader Yulia Tymoshenko stated she supported the 2012 language law. On 3 November 2014, newly elected president Petro Poroshenko declared that the language policy in Ukraine will be amended.

=== Law declared unconstitutional ===
On 10 July 2014, 57 parliamentary deputies appealed the Constitutional Court of Ukraine to review the 2012 law "On the principles of the state language policy". On 10 October 2014, the court opened the proceedings on the constitutionality of the law. On 14 December 2016, the Constitutional Court ended the oral proceedings, and on 13 January 2017, moved to the closed part of the process. On 28 February 2018, the Constitutional Court of Ukraine ruled the law unconstitutional.

== 2015 "Decommunization Laws" ==
In April 2015, the Verkhovna Rada passed a law banning communist as well as Nazi propaganda and symbols. The names of cities, villages, streets and squares that referred to communist slogans and leaders fell under the ban and had to be changed. According to Volodymyr Viatrovych, who had inspired the law, in October 2016 Ukraine's toponymy had undergone a complete process of decommunization, including in the Donbas region. Former Dnipropetrovsk became Dnipro, and Kirovohrad became Kropyvnytskyi.

The de-Russification of Ukrainian toponymy implied also the removal from railways and airports of any information board written in Russian; as of December 2016, all information had to be given only in Ukrainian and English. Free Ukrainian language courses for civil servants working in the Donetsk regional administration were organised, and from January 2017 Ukrainian became the only language of official and interpersonal communication in public institutions.

== 2016 Ukrainian language quotas in radio broadcasting ==
In June 2016, a new law was enacted requiring Ukraine's radio stations to play a quota of Ukrainian-language songs each day. At least a quarter of a radio station's daily playlist had to be in Ukrainian from then on, rising to 30% in 12 months' time and 35% a year after that. The law also required TV and radio broadcasters to ensure at least 60% of programs such as news and analysis are in Ukrainian. The law entered into force on 9 November, the national day for Ukrainian Language and Literacy. President Petro Poroshenko hailed the law calling on people to share their favourite Ukrainian song on social medias, while the pro-Russian Opposition Bloc criticised the law and said people had the right to decide for themselves what to listen to, and in which language. According to The Economist, the passage of a law downgrading Russian in Ukraine could have helped "spark war in that country; Vladimir Putin has used it as evidence that Ukrainian nationalists are bent on wiping out Russian culture there."

In May 2017, Verkhovna Rada enacted an analogous law prescribing a 75% Ukrainian-language quotas in all television channels operating in Ukraine.

== 2017 Education Law ==
Ukraine's 2017 education law made Ukrainian the required language of study in state schools from the fifth grade on, i.e. at the basic secondary and upper secondary levels, although it allowed instruction in other languages as a separate subject, to be phased in 2023. Education in minority languages in kindergarten and primary school remained unchanged, but at secondary level, students could only learn their native languages as a separate subject. Additionally, from grade five onwards, two or more subjects could be taught in any of the languages of the EU, which include minority languages such as Hungarian, Polish and Romanian but not Belarusian, Yiddish and Russian.

The 2017 education law provoked harsh reactions in Hungary, Romania, Russia, Poland, Bulgaria and other countries. The Romanian parliament passed a motion condemning the law and warned that Ukraine could not proceed towards EU integration without respecting the language rights of national minorities. The Russian Duma and Federation Council also adopted a resolution lamenting the violation of the language rights of the Russian-speaking minority in Ukraine. The Hungary–Ukraine relations rapidly deteriorated over the issue of the Hungarian minority in Ukraine, as the education law was accused of being nationalistic and needlessly provocative. Ukrainian president Petro Poroshenko defended the law, claiming that "The law ensures equal opportunities for all ... It guarantees every graduate strong language skills essential for a successful career in Ukraine". Hungary is since 2017 blocking Ukraine's attempt to integrate within the EU and NATO to help the Hungarian minority in Ukraine.

On 7 December 2017, the European Commission for Democracy through Law (Venice Commission) stated that criticism of the law seemed justified, as the shift to all-Ukrainian secondary education could infringe on the rights of ethnic minorities. Moreover, according to the Venice Commission, allowing certain subjects to be taught in the official languages of the EU could discriminate against speakers of Russian, the most widely used non-state language. The Venice Commission formulated seven recommendations to the Ukrainian Government to amend the law; according to the new Ukrainian president Volodymyr Zelenskyy, Ukraine has implemented six of these seven recommendations as of 2019.

In January 2020 the law was changed and made it legal to teach "one or more disciplines" in "two or more languages – in the official state language, in English, in another official languages of the European Union". All non-state funded schools were made free to choose their own language of instruction.

According to the 2020 law until the fifth year of education all lessons can be completely taught in the minority language without mandatory teaching of subjects in Ukrainian. In the fifth year not less than 20% of the lessons must be taught in Ukrainian. Then every year the volume of teaching in the state language (Ukrainian) should increase, reaching 40% in the ninth grade. In the twelfth and final year at least 60% of education should be taught in Ukrainian.

The 2017 language education law stipulated a 3-year transitional period to come in full effect. In February 2018, this period was extended until 2023. In June 2023 this period was again extended to September 2024.

== Lviv Oblast ==
In September 2018, Lviv Oblast Council introduced a ban on the public use of the Russian-language cultural products (movies, books, songs, etc.) throughout the Lviv Oblast until the full cessation of the occupation of Ukraine's territory. Human rights activists and lawyers called the law ill-defined, illegal, and unconstitutional. The Lviv Regional Council decision was successfully challenged in an Administrative Court, among others by the Chuhuiv Human Rights Group; however, on 14 May 2019, the judgment of the Administrative Court was revoked on technical grounds by the Cassation Chamber of the Supreme Court of Ukraine. The Chuhuiv Human Rights Group announced that they would file a lawsuit to the European Court of Human Rights against the ban. The ban was overturned in January 2019 by a court.

== 2019 Law on Protecting the Functioning of the Ukrainian Language as the State Language ==
"On protecting the functioning of the Ukrainian language as the state language"

Verkhovna Rada
- Long title: Law of Ukraine "On protecting the functioning of the Ukrainian language as the state language"
- Signed by: Petro Poroshenko
- Signed: 15 May 2019
- Effective: 16 July 2019

Legislative history
- Bill title: No.5670-d, "On Protecting the Functioning of the Ukrainian Language as the State Language"
- First reading: 4 October 2018
- Second reading: 25 April 2019
- Status: In force

The law "On Protecting the Functioning of the Ukrainian Language as the State Language" made the use of Ukrainian compulsory (totally or within certain quotas) in the work of some public authorities, in the electoral procedures and political campaigning, in pre-school, school and university education, in scientific, cultural and sporting activities, in book publishing and book distribution, in printed mass media, television and radio broadcasting, in economic and social life (commercial advertising, public events), in hospitals and nursing homes, and in the activities of political parties and other legal entities (e.g. non-governmental organizations) registered in Ukraine. Some special exemptions are provided for the Crimean Tatar language, other languages of indigenous peoples of Ukraine, the English language and the other official languages of the European Union; as languages of minorities that are not EU official languages, Russian, Belarusian and Yiddish are excluded from the exemptions.

=== First vote ===
On 4 October 2018, the Verkhovna Rada (the Ukrainian parliament) voted with a majority of 261 MPs in the first reading of a new language law (bill No.5670-d, "On Protecting the Functioning of the Ukrainian Language as the State Language"). Thereafter, the bill "was prepared for second reading for about four months. During this time, the Verkhovna Rada's Committee on culture and spirituality worked out over 2,000 amendments to the document that were proposed by people's deputies. In particular, the document proposes creating the national commission on the standards of the state language and introducing the post of commissioner for the protection of the state language. Lawmakers started considering the document at second reading on February 28. The Verkhovna Rada continue[d] to review amendments to the bill during March 12–15 [2019]." The Council of Europe asked the Verkhovna Rada to postpone the adoption of the bill until the post-election period.

=== Second vote and signing ===
On 25 April 2019, the Ukrainian parliament adopted the law. Patriarch Filaret and former Ukrainian president Viktor Yushchenko were present in the parliament during the vote. On the same day pro-Russian members of the Ukrainian Parliament blocked the chairman, Andriy Parubiy, from signing it by introducing two draft resolutions to repeal the law. "If parliament d[id] not support these resolutions, [Parliament chairman] Andriy Parubiy ha[d] the right to sign the law and forward it to the President of Ukraine to get his signature on it." In total, four motions of appeal to cancel the law were submitted, and it was planned that the parliament would vote on those on 14 May 2019. Parubiy declared that after the parliament would have rejected those appeals, he would sign the law, and that the Ukrainian President would sign it "without delay."

Then President Petro Poroshenko called the adoption of the law by the Ukrainian parliament "a historic decision" and said he would sign the law as soon as he received it from parliament. Poroshenko also said that the law "would not have been approved without Andriy Parubiy".

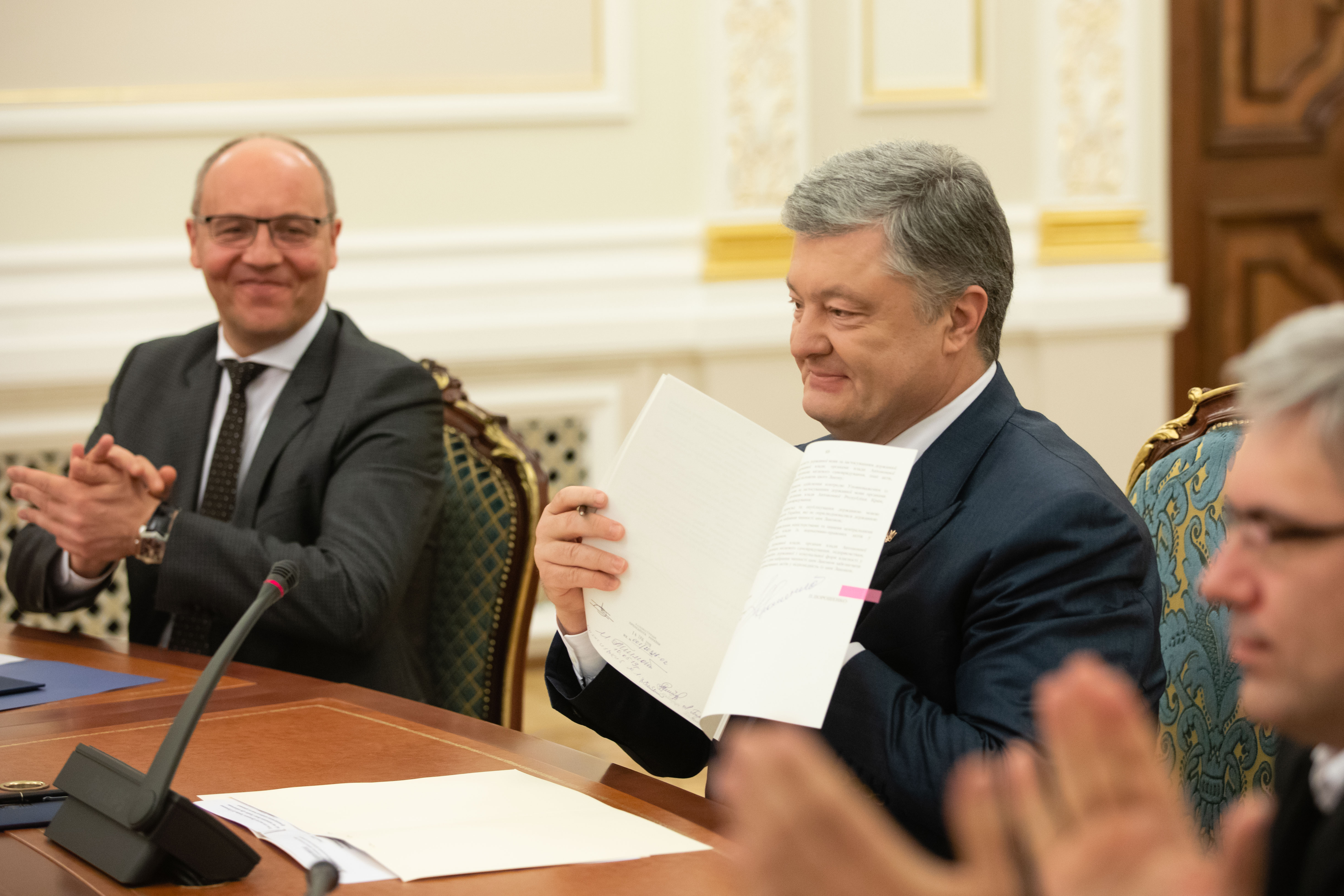
Poroshenko showing the law signed. Chairman of the Ukrainian parliament Andriy Parubiy is on the left

Parliament chairman Parubiy signed the law on 14 May 2019, after the four draft bills to cancel the bill No.5670-d were rejected by parliament. Parubiy said that the law "will be signed by the president of Ukraine in the coming hours or days." On 15 May 2019, President Poroshenko, in his last week in office, signed the law.

On 21 June 2019, the Constitutional Court received a petition from 51 members of the Ukrainian Parliament demanding that the law be checked for constitutionality. On 14 July 2021, the Constitutional Court ruled the law as constitutional.

=== Analysis ===
The law regulates the Ukrainian language in the media, education, and business aiming to strengthen its role in a country where much of the public still speaks Russian. The Law does not apply to the sphere of private communication and the conduct of religious rites.

The law requires every citizen to be proficient in Ukrainian and prevents access to "state positions" (members of parliament, civil servants, etc.) if their knowledge of Ukrainian is insufficient. Ukrainian is the working language of both central and local authorities. In principle, all public authorities only accept to examine documents and applications written in Ukrainian, and their regulations and individual implementing acts are written in Ukrainian.

The law requires elections and referendums to be conducted in Ukrainian and stipulates that all campaign material "broadcast on television, radio, placed on outdoor advertising media, distributed in the form of leaflets and newspapers, or posted on the Internet" be in Ukrainian. Political parties and non-governmental organizations registered in Ukraine are required to adopt their "constituent documents and decisions" in Ukrainian and use Ukrainian in their dealings with the public authorities.

Members of national minorities have the right to receive only preschool and primary education in their own language. As for secondary education, they have the right to study their own language as a subject, while one or more other subjects may be taught in English or one of the official languages of the European Union. Members of national minorities who do not speak an official EU language (Belarusians, Gagauzes, Jews, and Russians) may study at the secondary school level their language only as a subject.

Scientific publications and public scientific events can only be in Ukrainian, English or other official EU language, as well as all cultural, artistic, recreational and entertainment events, unless the use of other languages is justified for artistic reasons or for the purpose of protecting ethnic minority languages. Publishing houses are required to print, and bookstores are required to sell, at least 50% of their books in Ukrainian. TV and film distribution firms must ensure 90% of their content is in Ukrainian. The publication of print media in languages other than Ukrainian is permitted only on condition that they are accompanied by a Ukrainian translation, which must be identical in size, format, and substance. Exceptions are media published in Crimean Tatar or other indigenous languages (minorities which do not have a kin-State, such as Karaite and Krimchak minorities) and those published in English or other official EU languages. Films produced in Ukraine must be in Ukrainian, and foreign films must be dubbed into Ukrainian unless they meet certain standards set out by the Ukrainian authorities.

All publicly available information, such as advertisements, directional signs, pointers, signboards, messages, captions, must be in Ukrainian. Ukrainian is the language of "public events" in the broad sense that are organized or financed, in whole or in part, by any public governmental authority. Another language may be used, but the organizer must provide simultaneous or consecutive translation into Ukrainian "if requested by at least one participant in such public event".

The use of Ukrainian is also mandatory in the field of health care, medical care and medical services, but at the request of the service user, the service can be provided in another language acceptable to the parties.

Administrative pecuniary sanctions are applied as a consequence of violations of the law.

Contrary to the minority languages which are EU official languages, Russian, Belarusian and Yiddish are granted no exemption for the purposes of the law.

=== Reactions ===
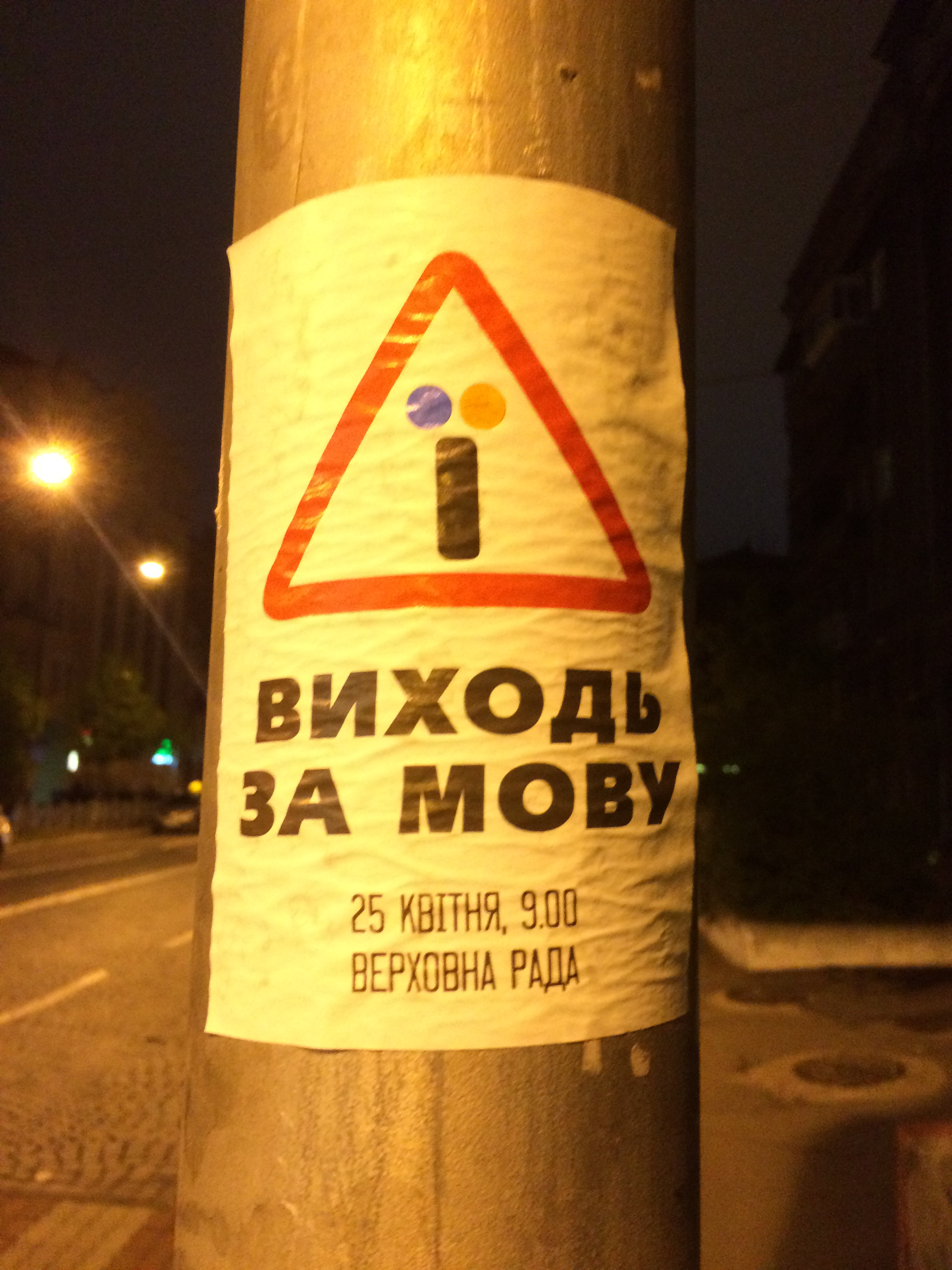
A street poster in support of the 2019 language law: "Stand up for the language".

On 26 April 2019, Hungarian foreign minister Péter Szijjártó said the law was "unacceptable" and "part of Poroshenko's anti-Hungarian policy".

On 30 April 2019, the European Commission said it would study and give its assessment to the law. On 22 May 2019, the Chair of the Monitoring Committee of the Parliamentary Assembly of the Council of Europe asked the Venice Commission to analyze the law. On 1 June 2019, OHCHR expressed concern about the absence of special legislation regulating the use of minority languages in Ukraine and criticised the distinction between minorities speaking an official EU language and other national minorities.

In December 2019, the Venice Commission said that several provisions of the law failed to strike a fair balance between promoting the Ukrainian language and safeguarding minorities' linguistic rights.

In May 2019, the Kyiv District Administrative Court dismissed an NGO's application to prohibit Verkhovna Rada President Andriy Parubiy from signing and publishing the law.

Russia asked the president of the UN Security Council to convene a meeting over the adoption by Ukraine's parliament of the law.

In January 2022, Human Rights Watch expressed concerns about protection for minority languages.

== 2022 restriction on Russian books and music ==
On 19 June 2022, the Ukrainian parliament passed two laws which place severe restrictions on Russian books and music. One law prohibits Russian citizens from printing books unless they renounce their Russian passport and take Ukrainian citizenship. The law also prohibits the import of books printed in Russia, Belarus, and the occupied Ukrainian territories, and requires a special authorisation for the import of Russian books from other countries. The other law bans the playing of music by post-Soviet era artists in the media and public transport and increases the quotas of Ukrainian speech and music contents in television and radio broadcasts.

On 7 July, President Volodymyr Zelenskyy signed the law restricting the public performance of Russian music on television and radio, and on 7 October, the law entered into force. The law allows the playing of post-Soviet Russian music if the musician is included in a "white list" of artists who have publicly condemned the Russian invasion of Ukraine. The Security Service of Ukraine decides on inclusion and exclusion from the list.

=== 2023 Kyiv language ban ===
On 13 July 2023, the Kyiv City Council prohibited the usage of "Russian language cultural products" in the city of Kyiv. This includes the performance of all Russian language products, such as books, music, and films, in public.

== 2023 changes to national minorities' rights ==
On 8 December 2022, the Ukrainian parliament passed a bill that amends some laws on the rights of national minorities in light of the Council of Europe’s expert assessment and in order to meet one of the European Commission’s criteria for the opening of Ukrainian European Union membership negotiations. These changes, in force from 8 January 2023, entitled privately-owned institutions of higher education to freely choose the language of study if it is an official language of the European Union, while ensuring that persons studying at such institutions study the state language Ukrainian as a separate academic discipline. It also guaranteed to national minorities whose mother tongue is among official languages of the European Union the right to use corresponding national minority language in the educational process along with Ukrainian.

The law ensured that pupils who had begun their general secondary education before 1 September 2018 in the language of the corresponding national minority, will have the right to continue to receive such education until the completion of their full secondary education in accordance with the rules that applied before the Law of Ukraine "On protecting the functioning of the Ukrainian language as the state language" came into force on 16 July 2019.

=== 2025 amendments ===
In 2025 the Ukrainian parliament approved a draft law that excluded Russian and "Moldovan" from the list of minority languages that are subject to protection under the European Charter for Regional or Minority Languages, also replacing the term "Jewish language" with Hebrew and adding several other languages. This law was signed by the president on 12 June 2026, hence providing protection to eighteen languages: Belarusian, Bulgarian, Crimean Tatar, Czech, Gagauz, German, Greek, Hebrew, Hungarian, Karaim, Krymchak, Polish, Romani, Romanian, Rumeika, Slovak, Urum, and Yiddish.

== See also ==
- Chronology of Ukrainian language suppression
- Derussification in Ukraine
- History of the Russian language in Ukraine
