= On Languages in the Ukrainian SSR =

- Emblem of the Ukrainian SSR

Verkhovna Rada
- Long title: Law of Ukraine 8312-XI "On Languages in the Ukrainian SSR"
- Territorial extent: Ukrainian SSR (1990–1991); Ukraine (1991–2012; 2018–2019)
- Passed: 28 October 1989
- Effective: 1 January 1990 (repealed 10 August 2012; restored 28 February 2018)

Amended by
- last amended 6 March 2003; repealed on 19 July 2019 by Law of Ukraine "On protecting the functioning of the Ukrainian language as the state language"
- Status: Expired

The Law of the Ukrainian SSR "On Languages in the Ukrainian SSR" (Ukrainian: Закон УРСР «Про мови в Українській РСР», romanized: Zakon URSR "Pro movy v Ukrajinsjkyj RSR") was adopted on 28 October 1989, in the early stages of the 1989–1991 Ukrainian revolution. It is also known as the 1989 Language Law. The law marked the first significant achievement of the national-democratic forces in Ukraine, primarily represented by the People's Movement of Ukraine (Rukh), and consolidated the positions that the Ukrainian intelligentsia and the national movement had secured by that time. Its adoption was possible due to the reforms in the USSR in the late 1980s, stimulated by Mikhail Gorbachev's policies of perestroika, glasnost, and demokratizatsiya. The 1989 Law on Languages preceded the Declaration of Independence of Ukraine by almost two years.

The 1989 language law was repealed by the 2012 law On the Principles of State Language Policy, which was subsequently repealed after being declared unconstitutional on 28 February 2018. Consequently, the Law of the Ukrainian SSR ‘On Languages in the Ukrainian SSR’ was automatically restored, and remained in force de jure until the adoption on 19 July 2019 of the Law of Ukraine "On protecting the functioning of the Ukrainian language as the state language".

== Contents of the Law ==
The Law contains the following sections:

I. General Provisions

II. The language used by state, party and public bodies, enterprises, institutions and organisations

III. The language of education, science, information technology and culture

IV. Language of information and communication

V. Language of names

VI. Promoting the national and cultural development of Ukrainians living outside the Ukrainian SSR

== Regulations ==
In accordance with Article 2, Ukrainian was established as the state language of the Ukrainian SSR:

In accordance with the Constitution of the Ukrainian SSR, the state language of the Ukrainian Soviet Socialist Republic is the Ukrainian language. The Ukrainian SSR ensures the comprehensive development and functioning of the Ukrainian language in all spheres of public life. Republican and local state, party and public bodies, enterprises, institutions and organisations shall create the necessary conditions for all citizens to learn the Ukrainian language and to master it thoroughly.

Original text
Відповідно до Конституції Української РСР державною мовою Української Радянської Соціалістичної Республіки є українська мова. Українська РСР забезпечує всебічний розвиток і функціонування української мови в усіх сферах суспільного життя. Республіканські і місцеві державні, партійні, громадські органи, підприємства, установи і організації створюють всім громадянам необхідні умови для вивчення української мови та поглибленого оволодіння нею.

At the same time, the Law stipulated in Article 3 that the state shall create the necessary conditions for the development and use of the languages of other nationalities living in Ukraine.

== Impactful consequences ==
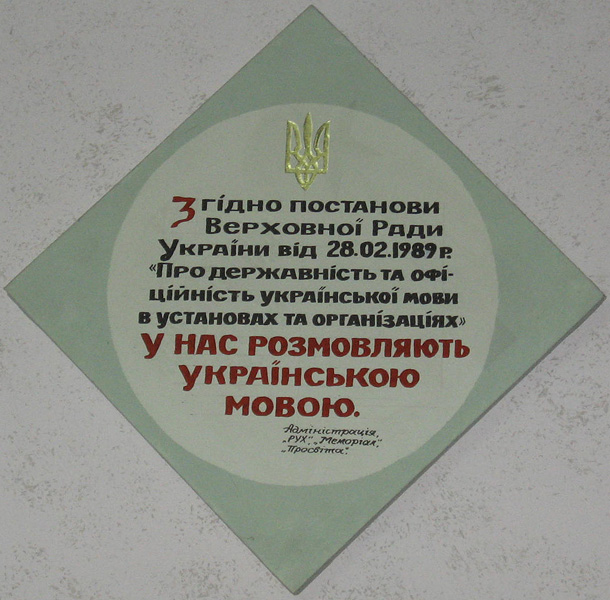
Notice in a Lviv hospital (dated mid-1990s, pictured 2007), paraphrasing Article 2 of the Law: "As 'the state language is the Ukrainian language [in] institutions and organisations', we speak Ukrainian here."

Pursuant to the Law (in particular, the preamble and Articles 1 and 2), the Council of Ministers of the Ukrainian SSR decided on 7 December 1989 to establish a Republican Commission to draw up a "State Programme for the Development of the Ukrainian Language and Other National Languages in the Ukrainian SSR for the Period Until 2000"; this draft programme was approved by the decision of the Council of Ministers on 12 February 1991. It provides for the gradual establishment of Ukrainian as the state language in different regions of the country.

However, the programme was implemented half-heartedly, particularly in the southern and eastern regions. The main newspaper of Crimea, the Krymskaya Pravda, ceased publishing in Ukrainian in September 1991 (see 1991 Crimean autonomy referendum). The process was also slowed down by the fact that, between 1994 and the first half of 1996, certain political forces (including the Donetsk Oblast Council in July 1993, president Leonid Kuchma) strongly advocated for Russian to be declared an 'official' (офіційної, ofitsijnoji) language alongside Ukrainian, the state language. In effect, this would have meant two state languages, since the term 'official language' (офіційна мова, ofitsijna mova) in international practice is synonymous with the term 'state language' (державна мова, derzhavna mova). Recognising Russian as an official language would have led to a significant restriction of the Ukrainian language's function as the sole state language. But Kuchma's proposals were never turned into legislation.

On the other hand, the 1996 Constitution of Ukraine reinforced the 1989 language law in Article 10:

The state language of Ukraine is the Ukrainian language. The State ensures the comprehensive development and functioning of the Ukrainian language in all spheres of social life throughout the entire territory of Ukraine. In Ukraine, the free development, use and protection of Russian, and other languages of national minorities of Ukraine, is guaranteed.

== Significance ==
The adoption of the Law "On Languages in the Ukrainian SSR" marked a consolidation of democratic achievements across the territory of the former USSR. Similar laws had been passed by the Georgian SSR and the parliaments of the Baltic republics. Ukraine was next in line. However, the language law differed somewhat from the more radical draft bill proposed by the National Writers' Union of Ukraine and the Taras Shevchenko Ukrainian Language Society.

At the same time, the significant role of the Russian language in Ukraine was consolidated. In particular, officials were required to be proficient in both Ukrainian and Russian, documents issued by the highest authorities had to be published in both languages, and the study of Ukrainian and Russian was compulsory in all general education schools. Contrary to the law, this final provision was not implemented in independent Ukraine; Russian became an optional subject in many secondary schools.

== See also ==
- Chronology of Ukrainian language suppression actions
- Ukrainization in the 1920s and 1930s
- Internationalism or Russification? (1965 essay)
- On the Principles of State Language Policy (2012 law; declared unconstitutional in 2018)
- Russian book ban in Ukraine (2016)
- Derussification in Ukraine (since 2016)
- Law of Ukraine "On protecting the functioning of the Ukrainian language as the state language" (2019 law)
- On the Condemnation and Prohibition of Propaganda of Russian Imperial Policy in Ukraine and the Decolonization of Toponymy (2023 law)

== Sources and literature ==
- Azhniuk, Bohdan (2017). "Ukrainian Language Legislation and the National Crisis". Harvard Ukrainian Studies. 35 (1/4). Harvard Ukrainian Research Institute: 311–329. ISSN 0363-5570. JSTOR 44983546.
- Csernicskó, István; Fedinec, Csilla (2016). "Four Language Laws of Ukraine". International Journal on Minority and Group Rights. 23 (4). Brill: 560–582. ISSN 1385-4879. JSTOR 26557843.
- Solchanyk, Roman (1994). "The Politics of State Building: Centre–Periphery Relations in Post-Soviet Ukraine". Europe-Asia Studies. 46 (1). Taylor & Francis, University of Glasgow: 47–68. ISSN 0966-8136. JSTOR 153030.
- Shemshuchenko, Yuriy Serhiyovych (2005). "Закон УРСР «Про мови в Українській РСР» 1989" [Law URSR "On Languages in the Ukrainian RSR"]. Encyclopedia of History of Ukraine (in Ukrainian). Vol. 3. Kyiv: Institute of History of Ukraine. p. 672. Archived from the original on 3 April 2026.
- Shemshuchenko, Yuriy Serhiyovych. "Закон УРСР «Про мови в Українській РСР» 1989" [Law URSR "On Languages in the Ukrainian RSR"]. Legal Encyclopedia (in Ukrainian). Archived from the original on 9 August 2016.
- ЗАКОН УКРАЇНСЬКОЇ РАДЯНСЬКОЇ СОЦІАЛІСТИЧНОЇ РЕСПУБЛІКИ "Про мови в Українській РСР"
- "Закон Української Радянської Соціалістичної Республіки «Про мови в Українській РСР»" [Law of the Ukrainian Soviet Socialist Republic ‘On Languages in the Ukrainian SSR’]. Website Verkhovna Rada. Archived from the original on 22 June 2020.
