= Language ombudsman (Ukraine) =

Ukrainian state official

In Ukraine, the State Language Protection Commissioner (Ukrainian: Уповноважений Верховної Ради з захисту державної мови), informally Language Ombudsman (Ukrainian: мовний омбудсман) is a state official in charge of the enforcement of the Law of Ukraine "On protecting the functioning of the Ukrainian language as the state language" (2019), as an element of derussification (minimization the influence of the Russian language in Ukraine) and increase the usage of the Ukrainian language (Ukrainianization), which is the only state language in the country.

== Commissioner's duties ==
Commissioner's tasks are defined as follows:

- protection of Ukrainian as the state language;
- protection of the right of Ukrainian citizens to receive information and services in the spheres of public life in the state language on the whole territory of Ukraine and removal of any obstacles and restrictions in using the state language.

In order to fulfill these tasks, the Commissioner:

- submits proposals to the Cabinet of Ministers concerning state language protection and its development and functioning on the whole territory of Ukraine, as well as unchallenged use of Ukrainian by Ukrainians living abroad;
- enforces the laws on the state language policy and dedicated programmes on comprehensive development and functioning of Ukrainian as the state language;
- deals with legal persons' complaints on action and failure to act of authorities, enterprises of all ownership models and other legal persons concerning state language legislation.

Commissioner carries out his activities independently of other state bodies and officials, he is appointed by the Cabinet of Ministers of Ukraine under a special procedure for the term of five years.

The activity of the State Language Protection Commissioner is also regulated by other legislative acts (legal and regulatory framework).

== Office holders ==
- 2019: Tetyana Monakhova
- 2020: Taras Kremin
- 2025: Olena Ivanovska

== See also ==
- National Commission on State Language Standards, Ukraine
- Russification of Ukraine
- Russians in Ukraine
- Russian language in Ukraine
- Chronology of Ukrainian language suppression
- Internationalism or Russification?
- Ukrainianization
- Derussification in Ukraine
- Languages of Ukraine
- Language policy in Ukraine
