= Law of Ukraine "On protecting the functioning of the Ukrainian language as the state language" =

2019 law of Ukraine

On Ensuring the Official Status of the Ukrainian Language as the State Language
- Coat of arms of Ukraine

Verkhovna Rada
- Long title: Law of Ukraine On Ensuring the Official Status of the Ukrainian Language as the State Language
- Territorial extent: Ukraine
- Passed by: Presidential decree
- Passed: April 25, 2019
- Signed by: Petro Poroshenko; Andriy Parubiy, Chairman of the Verkhovna Rada
- Signed: May 15, 2019
- Effective: July 16, 2019

Legislative history
- Bill title: No.5670-d, "On Ensuring the Official Status of the Ukrainian Language as the State Language"
- First reading: October 4, 2018
- Second reading: April 25, 2019
- Voting summary: 278 voted for; 38 voted against; 7 abstained

Related legislation
- see §
- Status: In force

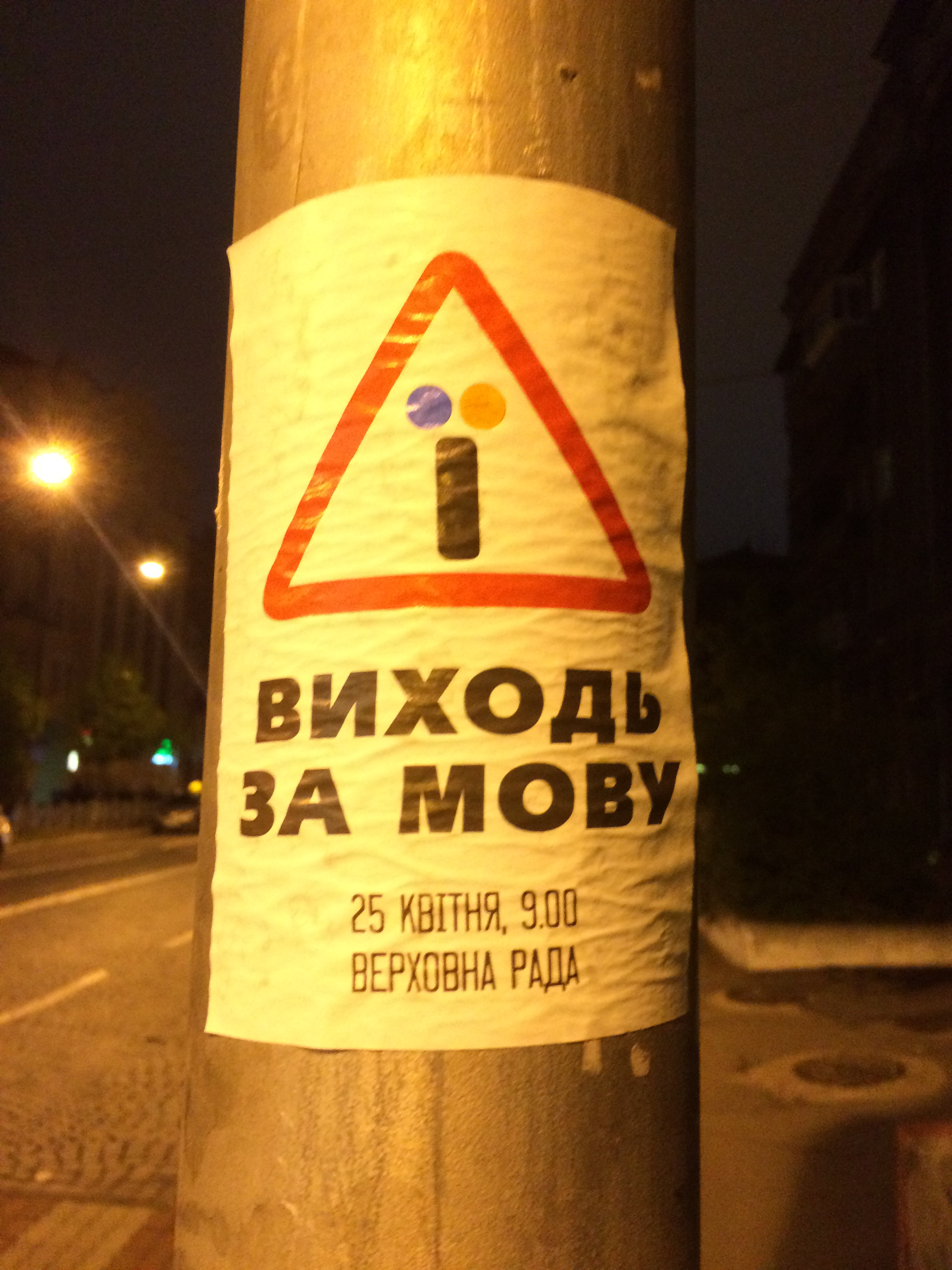
Poster for the adoption of the Law, with the text "Виходь за мову – 25 квітня 2019, ВРУ" (Come out for the language – April 25, 2019, Verkhovna Rada of Ukraine)

The Law of Ukraine "On Ensuring the Official Status of the Ukrainian Language as the State Language" (Ukrainian: Закон України «Про забезпечення функціонування української мови як державної») (Note: Romanized: Zakon Ukrainy "Pro zabezpechennia funktsionuvannia ukrainskoi movy yak derzhavnoi") is a law approved by the Verkhovna Rada of Ukraine on April 25, 2019, and which took full effect on July 16 of the same year. The law was passed by 278 votes of the People's Deputies. 38 voted against, 7 abstained, and 25 didn't vote; It was signed by Chairman of the Parliament Andriy Parubiy and President Petro Poroshenko.

Previously, the state of the Ukrainian language was regulated by the Law of Ukraine "On the Principles of State Language Policy" (so-called "Kivalov-Kolesnichenko law"). After the Revolution of Dignity (Ukrainian: Революція Гідності), an attempt was made to repeal it, but the then Chairman of the Parliament and acting President of Ukraine Oleksandr Turchynov did not sign the Parliament's decision, citing the need to draft a new law first. The Kivalov-Kolesnichenko law was declared unconstitutional and, to replace it, the bill 5670-d was prepared and approved in the first reading in October 2018. Public activists and experts participated in drafting the law.

== New institutions ==
The law provides for the creation of the following institutions:

- State Language Protection Commissioner – To monitor compliance with the law. This official can file a complaint about the violation of the law. The Office of the Commissioner shall examine and respond to the complaint within 10 days of its submission. On November 27, 2019, Tatiana Monakhova became the Commissioner for State Language Protection.
- National Commission on State Language Standards – The central executive body will develop and approve the standards of the Ukrainian language as the state language.

== Content ==
The law gives priority to the Ukrainian language in more than 30 spheres of public life: in particular in public administration, media, education, science, culture, advertising, services. It does not regulate private communication.

Article 24 "State language in the field of television and radio broadcasting" has been amended: from 90% of Ukrainian-language broadcasts on national channels after the first reading was reduced to 75%, as in the Law on Television and Broadcasting.

=== Outstanding provisions of the new language law ===
- The status of the Ukrainian language is an integral element of the constitutional order of Ukraine as a unitary state (art. 1, h. 3).
- The Ukrainian language as the only State language performs the functions of the language of interethnic communication, is a guarantee of protection of human rights for all Ukrainian citizens regardless of their ethnic origin and is a factor of unity and national security of Ukraine (Art. 1, h. 8).
- The State organizes free Ukrainian language courses for adults and offers the opportunity to freely master the State language to Ukrainian citizens who did not have that opportunity (Article 6, Part 3).
- Articles 9, 10 and 11 define an extremely wide range of persons for whom knowledge of the State language is compulsory; requirements for the level of proficiency in the State language and the levels themselves.
- No one shall be required to use a language other than Ukrainian at work and in the performance of his duties under a contract of employment (Art. 20, h. 1). It is forbidden to require knowledge of a language other than the State language to access the job.
- The print media may be published in languages other than the national language, provided that the publication of this publication in a foreign language is published simultaneously with the corresponding edition of the publication in the State language (art. 25, h. 1).
- In each place of distribution of the printed media, the printed media in the State language must be at least 50 percent of the titles of the printed media distributed in that place (art. 25, h. 4).
- The provisions of Article 25 do not apply, in particular, to publications in indigenous languages, including the Crimean Tatar language, or to publications such as the Kyiv Post, which is published in English and is intended for foreign readers who do not yet speak the State language.
- The publisher registered in the State Register of Publishers, Producers and Distributors of Publishing Products is required to publish in the state language at least 50 percent of all titles of book editions published by him during the corresponding calendar year (art. 26, h. 1).
- The art. 30 "State language in the field of customer service", assigns exclusively that area the Ukrainian language. At the customer's request, their personal service may also be provided in another language acceptable to the parties (Part 3). This means that the first request of the service employee must sound in Ukrainian and, at the request of the client, you have the right, but you are not required to change to another language, and this will not be a violation if you change. Because the main thing - ensure the dissemination of the State language in all public spheres of life and guarantee the constitutional right of citizens to receive services in the Ukrainian language.

==== Criticisms for not acting on the private sphere ====
- This law does not apply to the field of private communication and the performance of religious rites (art. 2, h. 2). However, the concept of "private communication" is vague and the law doesn't specify the scope of this term.
- According to critics, the lack of enacting of the law on the private sphere of life hinders the development of the Ukrainian language as the national language of Ukrainians and does not accelerate the Ukrainization of society. The law also does not establish or regulate the use of the languages of religious rites.

The law establishes rules on the procedure for imposing fines on business entities for non-compliance with the law on the use of the State language in the field of customer service.

The provision about "Language acceptable to the parties" is used in many areas, including retail, healthcare and transport.

A separate section of the law is devoted not only to the State National Language Standards Commission, but also to the State Language Protection Commissioner.

The law also complies with s. Article 12 of the Constitution of Ukraine, which emphasizes that Ukraine is concerned with meeting the national, cultural and linguistic needs of Ukrainians living abroad, provides an opportunity for members of the Ukrainian diaspora to take steps to master the State language. the obligation to speak the State language to receive a certificate of foreign Ukrainian.

The law as a whole came into force two months after its publication, and a number of separate rules are postponed for 6 months, 2 years, 3 years and even more than 10 years. - as: "The language of independent external assessment based on the results of secondary education and entrance examinations is the state language, except for independent external assessment in foreign languages" (enters into force on January 1, 2030).

== Attempts to repeal ==
On April 25, 2019, the Verkhovna Rada approved it in second reading by a total of 278 votes. 38 voted against, 7 abstained, 25 did not vote.

=== Counter-resolutions (April–May 2019) ===
Immediately after the end of the vote, pro-Russian MPs Vadym Novynskyi, Oleksandr Vilkul, Yuriy Boyko and Nestor Shufrych introduced four resolutions on its abolition. Prior to the consideration of these documents in the session hall, neither the Chairman of the Parliament Andrii Parubii nor the President Petro Poroshenko were able to sign this law. Consideration of the draft resolutions was scheduled for May 14, 2019.

The application by Iryna Berezhna's "Institute of Legal Policy and Social Protection" to the Chairman Andrii Parubii, which blocked the signing of the Law, was rejected by the Kyiv District Administrative Court on May 11.

On May 14, 2019, the Verkhovna Rada rejected draft resolutions blocking the signing of a previously passed law, and immediately afterwards Chairman Andrii Parubii signed the law and President Petro Poroshenko signed it the next day.

=== Constitutional Court case (June 2019 – July 2021) ===
In June 2019, following the inauguration of Volodymyr Zelenskyy, before the entry into force of the law, the Constitutional Court of Ukraine received a petition of 51 members of Parliament on the constitutionality of the law. The petition was mostly signed by the People's Deputies from the Opposition Bloc faction. According to the document, the petitioners are authorized by Oleksandr Dolzhenkov, a member of the Opposition Bloc, and Vadym Novynskyi, a co-chair of the Opposition Bloc faction in the Parliament.

The authors stated that the by the Law, "[t]he Russian language at the legislative level is completely excluded from labor relations, education, science, culture, television and radio, print media, publishing and distribution of books, interfaces of computer users... computer programs and websites, public events, consumer services, sports, telecommunications and postal services, office work, document management, correspondence and all other areas of citizens' lives" and that the law contradicts the European Charter for Regional or Minority Languages.

On July 14, 2021, the Constitutional Court of Ukraine upheld the Law's constitutionality in its entirety. Several Judges expressed separate and convergent opinions on the decision.

=== Buzhanskyi's repeal proposal (December 2019) ===
In December 2019, MP Maksym Buzhanskyi introduced a bill recognizing the repealed law "on the basis of newly discovered circumstances, given the decision of the Venice Commission". However, Buzhanskyi' proposal lacked support, and evoked such opposition that it was decided not to be tabled in the Rada.

== Reactions ==
On May 16, the Hungarian Foreign Ministry issued a statement on the signing of the law by the President of Ukraine Petro Poroshenko. Hungarian diplomats described the law as "in line with the spirit of Petro Poroshenko" and expressed hope that newly elected President Volodymyr Zelenskyy could resolve "problematic issues" concerning the Hungarian national minority in Ukraine.

Ukrainian Romanian professor at the University of Chernivtsi and honorary member of the Romanian Academy Alexandrina Cernov criticized the law, saying that it would affect "very seriously" the Romanian minority in Ukraine.

The Russian Federation invited the UN Security Council to convene a meeting to condemn the law. The UN Assembly and the Security Council have refused to assess the law passed in Ukraine. At the beginning of the meeting, representatives of several countries spoke out against the issue.

== Implementation ==
On July 16, 2021, the Article 23 regarding distribution and displaying of films came into force. However, the results of the monitoring carried out in the next two days of the entry into force of the law, found out that six Ukrainian TV channels disregarded the law and "continued to show movies, TV series and programs in Russian language with Ukrainian subtitles".

On January 16, 2022, the Article 25 came into force, according to which print media is allowed to be printed and distributed in a languages other than the state language if publication will also be published in the State language at the same time. Versions in different languages must be published with the same name, corresponding to each other in content, volume, printing method and be published in the same day. Distribution by subscriptions of print media in languages other than the state language is allowed if possibility of subscription to a version in the state language is provided.

Such provisions of the law do not apply to print media published in Crimean Tatar language, English or another official language of the European Union. Its effect so far extends to national and regional media; local media will have a 30-month transition period and will be required to comply with the requirements of Article 25 from July 16, 2024.

== See also ==
- Language ombudsman (Ukraine)
- Ukrainian language
- Russian language in Ukraine
- Russification of Ukraine
- Derussification in Ukraine
- Chronology of Ukrainian language suppression
- Ukrainianization
- Law of Ukraine "On the Protection of the Constitutional Order in the Sphere of Activities of Religious Organizations"
