= Oleksiy Leonov =

Ukrainian politician

- Олексій Леонов
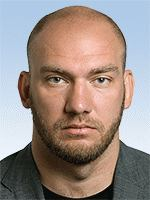
- Official portrait, 2019

People's Deputy of Ukraine
- Incumbent
- Assumed office 29 August 2019
- Preceded by: Serhii Kivalov
- Constituency: Odesa Oblast, No. 135

Personal details
- Born: 26 February 1983 (age 43) Odesa, Ukrainian SSR, Soviet Union (now Ukraine)
- Party: Servant of the People (since 2019)
- Other political affiliations: Independent (before 2019)
- Education: Odesa Maritime Tourist Service Higher Vocational School

Oleksiy Oleksandrovych Leonov (Ukrainian: Олексій Олександрович Леонов; born 26 February 1983) is a Ukrainian politician currently serving as a People's Deputy of Ukraine representing Ukraine's 162nd electoral district from Servant of the People since 29 August 2019.

== Early life and career ==
Oleksiy Oleksandrovych Leonov was born on 26 February 1983 in the city of Odesa, then under the rule of the Soviet Union. He is a graduate of the Odesa Maritime Tourist Service Higher Vocational School, and is trained in cooking. He is co-owner of the restaurant chain Pizza&Grill and the Slow Piggy restaurant, having also worked as a chef in London and Estonia.

Since 2014, Leonov has been engaged in social activities, including leading the public campaign "I'm an Odesan, and I don't care". He also worked as an assistant to People's Deputy of Ukraine Vitalii Kurylo.

== Political career ==
Leonov ran in the 2019 Ukrainian parliamentary election to be a People's Deputy from Ukraine's 135th electoral district in the city of Odesa. At the time of the election, he was an independent. He was successfully elected, defeating independent incumbent Serhii Kivalov with 40.21% of the vote to Kivalov's 31.63%.

In the Verkhovna Rada (Ukraine's parliament), Leonov joined the Servant of the People faction, as well as the Verkhovna Rada Committee on Finance, Tax, and Customs Policy. On 10 November 2019, Leonov became a member of the Servant of the People party. Leonov acquired attention and controversy for not supporting a bill which would have reduced corrupt practices within the real estate industry, a position supported by independent People's Deputy and real estate magnate Anton Yatsenko. Anti-corruption non-governmental organisation Chesno also criticised Leonov for breaching financial disclosure laws by not stating that he spent over ₴92,000 in online advertisements during his campaign.
