= Russian language in Ukraine =

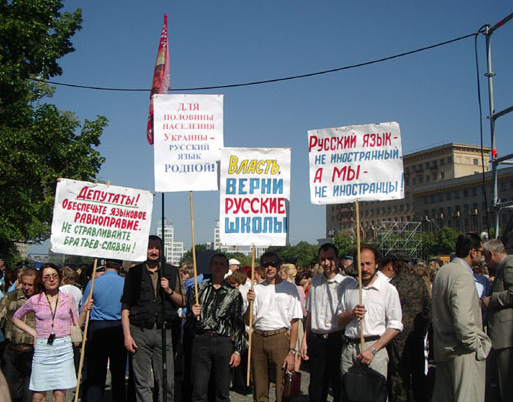
Members of a Russophone association supporting the 2006 decision of the Kharkiv City Council to make the Russian language official at local level

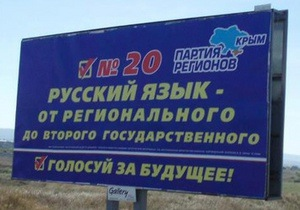
Party of Regions 2012 parliamentary election campaign poster in Crimea stating "Russian: (upgrade it) from a regional language to the second official (state) language"

Russian is the most common first language in the Donbas and Crimea regions of Ukraine and the cities of Kharkiv and Odesa, and a main language in large cities in the eastern and southern portions of the country. The usage and status of the language is the subject of political disputes. Ukrainian is the country's sole state language since the adoption of the 1996 Constitution, which prohibits an official bilingual system at state level but also guarantees the free development, use and protection of Russian and other languages of national minorities. In 2017 a new Law on Education was passed which restricted the use of Russian as a language of instruction. Almost a decade later in 2026, Ukraine has removed Russian from the list of languages to which the provisions of the European Charter for Regional or Minority Languages apply.

== History of the Russian language in Ukraine ==
The East Slavic languages originated in the language spoken in Rus in the medieval period. Significant differences in spoken language in different regions began after the division of the Rus lands between the Golden Horde (from about 1240) and the Grand Duchy of Lithuania. The Lithuanian state eventually allied with the Kingdom of Poland in the Polish–Lithuanian Commonwealth of 1569–1795. Russians under the Golden Horde developed what became the modern Russian language; people in the northern Lithuanian sector developed Belarusian, and in the southern Polish sector Ukrainian.

The ethnonym "Ukrainian" for the south-eastern Slavic people did not become well-established until the 19th century, although English-speakers (for example) called those peoples' land "Ukraine" in English from before the 18th century (the Oxford English Dictionary traces the word "Ukrainian" in English back as far as 1804, and records its application to the Ukrainian language from 1886). The western part of the country, Austrian Galicia, Bukovina, and Carpathian Ruthenia, was generally known in German, French and English as "Ruthenia", and the people as "Ruthenians." The Russian imperial centre, however, preferred the names "Little" and "White" Russias for the Ukrainian and Belarusian lands respectively, as distinct from Great Russia.

No definitive geographical border separated people speaking Russian and those speaking Ukrainian – rather gradual shifts in vocabulary and pronunciation marked the areas between the historical cores of the languages.

Although Goriuns resided in the Putyvl region (in present-day northern Ukraine) in the times of Grand Duchy of Lithuania or perhaps even earlier, the Russian language mostly came through the migration of ethnic Russians to Ukraine and through the adoption of the Russian language by Ukrainians during the Russification of Ukraine.

=== Russian settlers ===
The first new waves of Russian settlers onto what is now Ukrainian territory came in the late-16th century to the empty lands of Slobozhanshchyna (in the region of Kharkiv) that Russia had gained from the Tatars, or from the Grand Duchy of Lithuania - although Ukrainian peasants from the Polish-Lithuanian west escaping harsh exploitative conditions outnumbered them.

More Russian speakers appeared in the northern, central and eastern territories of modern Ukraine during the late-17th century, following the Cossack Rebellion (1648–1657) which Bohdan Khmelnytsky led against Poland. The Khmelnytsky Uprising led to a massive movement of Ukrainian settlers to the Slobozhanshchyna region, which converted it from a sparsely inhabited frontier area to one of the major populated regions of the Tsardom of Russia. Following the Pereyaslav Rada of 1654 the northern and eastern parts of present-day Ukraine came under the hegemony of the Russian Tsardom. This brought the first significant, but still small, wave of Russian settlers into central Ukraine (primarily several thousand soldiers stationed in garrisons, out of a population of approximately 1.2 million non-Russians). Although the number of Russian settlers in Ukraine prior to the 18th century remained small, the local upper-classes within the part of Ukraine acquired by Russia came to use the Russian language widely.

Beginning in the late 18th century, large numbers of Russians (as well as of Armenians, Bulgarians, Greeks and of other Christians and Jews) settled in newly acquired lands in what is now southern Ukraine, a region then known as Novorossiya ("New Russia"). These lands – previously known as the Wild Fields – had been sparsely populated prior to the 18th century due to the threat of Crimean-Tatar raids, but once Saint Petersburg had eliminated the Tatar state as a threat, Russian nobles were granted large tracts of fertile land for working by newly arrived peasants, most of them ethnic Ukrainians but many of them Russians.

=== Settlement in the 19th century ===
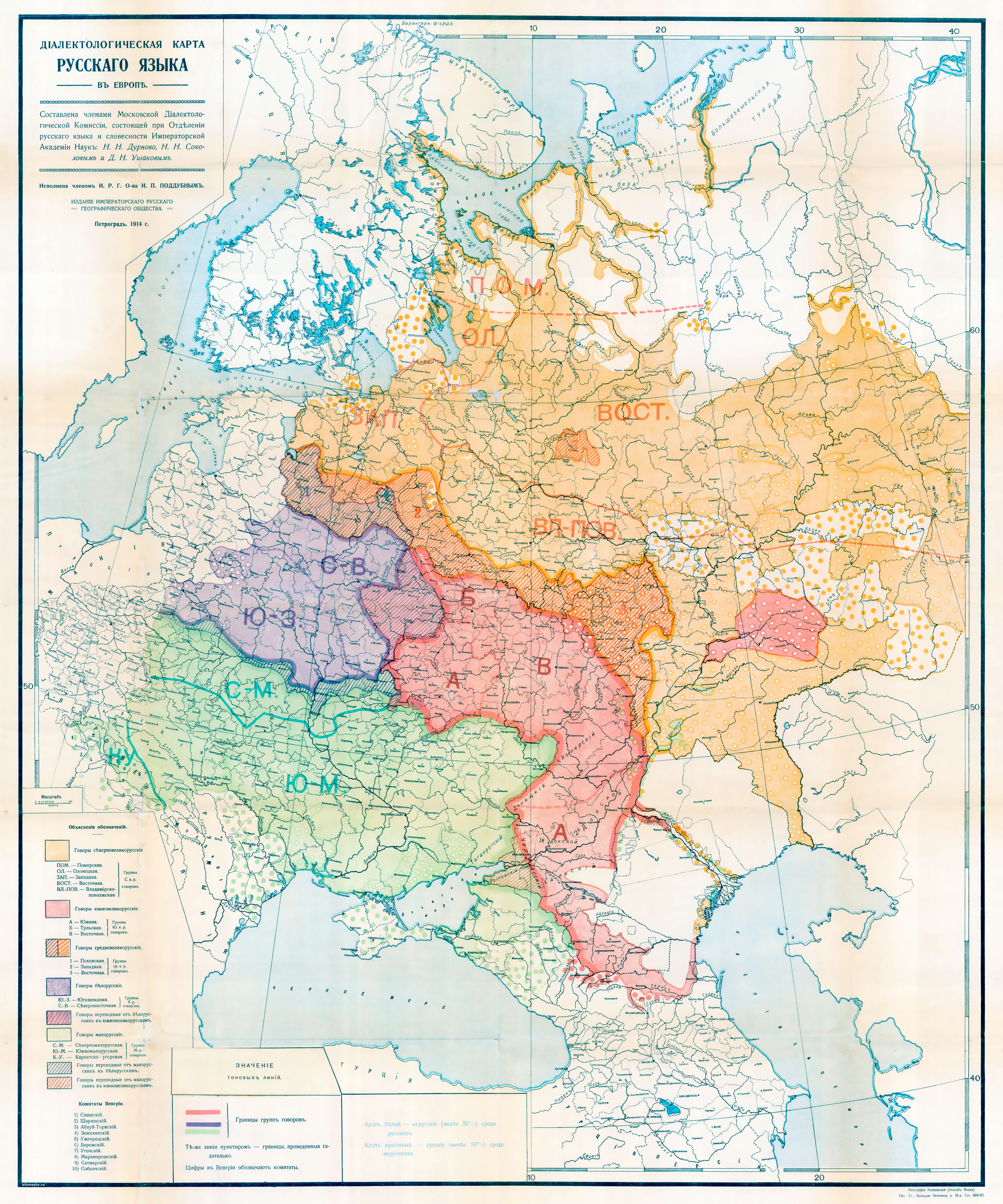
Dialects map of the Russian Language. Russian Imperial Academy of Sciences, 1914. Little Russian (Ukrainian) Great Russian (Russian) White Russian (Belarusian)

The 19th century saw a dramatic increase in the urban Russian population in present-day Ukraine, as ethnic Russian settlers moved into and populated the newly industrialised and growing towns. At the beginning of the 20th century the Russians formed the largest ethnic group in almost all large cities within Ukraine's modern borders, including Kyiv (54.2%), Kharkiv (63.1%), Odesa (49.09%), Mykolaiv (66.33%), Mariupol (63.22%), Luhansk, (68.16%), Kherson (47.21%), Melitopol (42.8%), Ekaterinoslav, (41.78%), Kropyvnytskyi (34.64%), Simferopol (45.64%), Yalta (66.17%), Kerch (57.8%), Sevastopol (63.46%). The Ukrainian migrants who settled in these cities entered a Russian-speaking milieu (particularly with Russian-speaking administration) and needed to adopt the Russian language.

=== Suppression and fostering of the Ukrainian language ===
The Russian Empire promoted the spread of the Russian language among the native Ukrainian population, actively refusing to acknowledge the existence of a Ukrainian language.

Alarmed by the threat of Ukrainian separatism (in its turn influenced by the 1863 demands of Polish nationalists), the Russian Minister of Internal Affairs Pyotr Valuev in 1863 issued a secret decree that banned the publication of religious texts and educational texts written in the Ukrainian language as non-grammatical, but allowed all other texts, including fiction. The Emperor Alexander II in 1876 expanded this ban by issuing the Ems Ukaz (which lapsed in 1905). The Ukaz banned all Ukrainian-language books and song-lyrics, as well as the importation of such works. Furthermore, Ukrainian-language public performances, plays, and lectures were forbidden. In 1881 the decree was amended by Alexander III to allow the publishing of lyrics and dictionaries, and the performances of some plays in the Ukrainian language with local officials' approval. Ukrainian-only troupes were, however, forbidden. Approximately 9% of the population spoke Russian at the time of the Russian Empire Census of 1897, as opposed to 44.31% of the total population of the Empire.

In 1918 the Soviet Council of People's Commissars decreed that nationalities under their control had the right to education in their own language. Thus Ukrainians in the Soviet era were entitled to study and learn in the Ukrainian language. During the Soviet times, the attitude to Ukrainian language and culture went through periods of promotion (policy of "korenization", c. 1923 to c. 1933), suppression (during the subsequent period of Stalinism), and renewed Ukrainization (notably in the epoch of Khrushchev, c. 1953 to 1964). Ukrainian cultural organizations, such as theatres or the Writers' Union, were funded by the central administration.

During the post-WW2 period, the Russification of ethnic Ukrainians, as well as the mass immigration of ethnic Russians, significantly changed the ethnic and linguistic composition of Ukraine's population. The change was especially evident in Donbas, where Ukrainian speakers became a minority.

The issue of the Russification of Ukraine and linguistic discrimination of Ukrainian speakers during the Soviet era was studied by the Ukrainian Soviet dissident Ivan Dziuba in his work "Internationalism or Russification?". While officially there was no state language in the Soviet Union until 1990, Russian in practice had an implicitly privileged position as the only language widely spoken across the country. In 1990 Russian became legally the official all-Union language of the Soviet Union, with constituent republics having rights to declare their own official languages. The Ukrainian language, despite official encouragement and government funding, like other regional languages, was often frowned upon or quietly discouraged, which led to a gradual decline in its usage.

=== Ukrainization in modern Ukraine ===
Since the Euromaidan of 2013–2014, the Ukrainian government has issued several laws aimed at encouraging Ukrainization in the media, in education and in other spheres.

In February 2017, the Ukrainian government banned the commercial importation of books from Russia, which had accounted for up to 60% of all titles sold in Ukraine.

On May 23, 2017, the Ukrainian parliament approved the law that most broadcast content should be in Ukrainian (75% of national carriers and 50% of local carriers).

The 2017 law on education provides that Ukrainian language is the language of education at all levels except for one or more subjects that are allowed to be taught in two or more languages, namely English or one of the other official languages of the European Union (i.e. excluding Russian). The law does state that persons belonging to the indigenous peoples of Ukraine are guaranteed the right to study at public pre-school institutes and primary schools in "the language of instruction of the respective indigenous people, along with the state language of instruction" in separate classes or groups. The Parliamentary Assembly of the Council of Europe (PACE) has expressed concern with this measure and with the lack of "real consultation" with the representatives of national minorities. In July 2018, The Mykolaiv Okrug Administrative Court liquidated the status of Russian as a regional language, on the suit (bringing to the norms of the national legislation due to the recognition of the law "On the Principles of State Language Policy" by the Constitutional Court of Ukraine as unconstitutional) of the First Deputy Prosecutor of the Mykolaiv Oblast. In October and December 2018, parliaments of the city of Kherson and of Kharkiv Oblast also abolished the status of the Russian language as a regional one.

The 2019 language law made Ukrainian mandatory in a number of spheres of public life.

In 2019 the law "On supporting the functioning of the Ukrainian language as the State language" made the use of Ukrainian compulsory (totally or within quotas) in more than 30 spheres of public life, including public administration, electoral process, education, science, culture, media, economic and social life, health and care institutions, and activities of political parties. The Venice Commission and Human Rights Watch expressed concern about the 2019 law's failure to protect the language rights of Ukrainian minorities.

The 2019 law did not regulate private communication nor ban the use of Russian language in the country, contrary to what some online claims created by Russia have asserted.

In 2021 Dnipropetrovsk District Administrative Court cancelled the regional language status of Russian in the Dnipropetrovsk Oblast.

In January 2022, a law requiring all print media to be published in Ukrainian came into force. It did not ban publication in Russian; however, it stipulated that a Ukrainian version of equivalent circulation and scope must be published – which is not a profitable option for publishers. Critics argue that the law could disenfranchise the country's Russian-speakers.

=== After the Russian invasion of Ukraine ===
Since February 2022, the beginning of Russian invasion, the everyday usage of Russian language in Ukraine has notably decreased, from 33% in 2021 to 23% in 2022. According to a survey of the Kyiv International Institute of Sociology in December 2022, 58 percent of Ukrainians considered Russian "unimportant". Additionally, in the fall of 2022, Russian was taken out of the educational curriculum in the cities of Kyiv, Mykolaiv, and Odesa. As per a February 2023 poll by RATING, 58% of respondents spoke exclusively Ukrainian at home, 30% spoke both Russian and Ukrainian, 11% spoke only Russian, 1% spoke a different one, and 1% found it difficult to say. However, this survey excluded the occupied Luhansk and Donetsk regions, as well as Crimea, and that in the different areas of the country (North, South, East and West), these percentages differed. For example, in the East, only 19% said that they speak exclusively Ukrainian, with 28% stating that they speak exclusively Russian, and 53% stating that they speak both languages.

According to a survey taken in April and May 2023 by the International Republican Institute, Russian remained widely used as the language spoken at home in many eastern Ukrainian cities, and a sizeable minority language elsewhere. The survey reported the following results:

Languages of Ukrainian Cities, May 2023
City	Russian	Ukrainian	Other languages^{[A]}
Odesa	80%	16%	4%
Kharkiv	78%	16%	6%
Zaporizhzhia	67%	23%	10%
Dnipro	66%	27%	7%
Mykolaiv	61%	30%	9%
Chernihiv	41%	53%	6%
Kyiv	38%	59%	3%
Sumy	27%	64%	9%
Kropyvnytskyi	20%	77%	3%
Cherkasy	18%	80%	2%
Chernivtsi	15%	82%	3%
Vinnytsia	15%	85%	< 1%
Zhytomyr	14%	82%	4%
Poltava	12%	75%	13%
Uzhhorod	9%	85%	6%
Khmelnytskyi	9%	88%	3%
Lviv	3%	96%	1%
Rivne	3%	96%	1%
Ivano-Frankivsk	3%	97%	< 1%
Ternopil	1%	98%	1%
Lutsk	1%	98%	1%

In 2026, Ukraine has removed Russian from the list of languages to which the provisions of the European Charter for Regional or Minority Languages apply.

^{A} In the survey, the majority of the people who picked the "Other languages" option used it to indicate "Both Russian and Ukrainian", especially in the eastern regions.

== Linguistic features ==
A sample of colloquial speech typical for Russian-speaking Ukrainians recorded during a TV show; note the pronunication of "Ukraine" as [ʊkrɐˈjinɐ] (unlike standard Russian [ukraˈina]), presence of [ɦ] instead of [g], usage of determiner шо ([ʃɔ]) instead of что ([ʂto]), pronunciation of [v] as [w], [u̯] - all emerged under the influence of Ukrainian language.

As the initial Russian settlement in Ukraine was led predominantly by isolated communities of Old Believers and Nekrasovites, their speech, based mostly upon Southern and Central Russian dialects, was preserved with comparatively little influence from their Ukrainian-speaking surroundings, with most of changes being represented with loanwords. In Sloboda Ukraine and in Southern regions, the majority of early Russian settlers were assimilated, as a result of which the local dialects adopted some features of the Russian language (see Slobozhan and Steppe dialects).

With the beginning of industrialization and urbanization, a distinct urban variety of Russian language emerged in the regions of Donbas and Dnipropetrovsk Oblast, as well as in major cities such as Odesa, Kyiv and Kharkiv, as a result of Russification of local Ukrainians and migration of Russian officials, merchants, craftsmen and workers. Especially after the Revolution of 1917, the local dialect adopted numerous elements of slang and argot. Known as Surzhyk, this peculiar language is characterized by the presence of features characteristic of both Ukrainian and Southern Russian dialects, such as the pronunciation of [g] as [ɦ] and [ɨ] as [ɪ]; less widespread akanye; [ě]>[e], [je]; unpalatalized word-final [r] and labial consonants; pronunciation of palatalized [v], [b], [p] before [a] as [vj], [bj], [pj]; unpalatalized [t͡ʃ], [ʃt͡ʃ]; preservation of Ukrainian-type stress and sandhi; declination of verbs and nouns according to Ukrainian grammar rules (e.g. по домах instead of Russian по домам).

== Usage statistics ==
Percentage of people with Russian as their native language according to 2001 census (in regions)

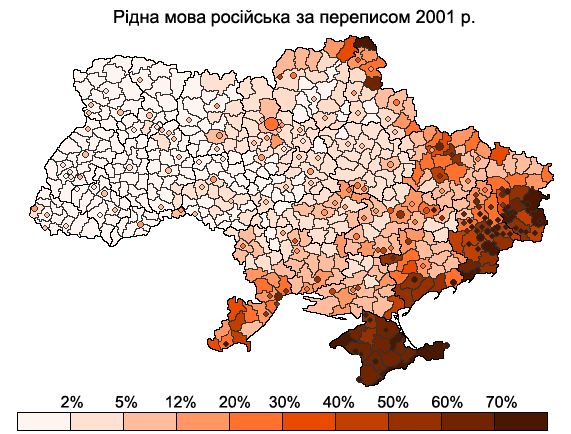
Map of people who declare Russian as their native language for each district or city (in circles) (according to 2001 census)

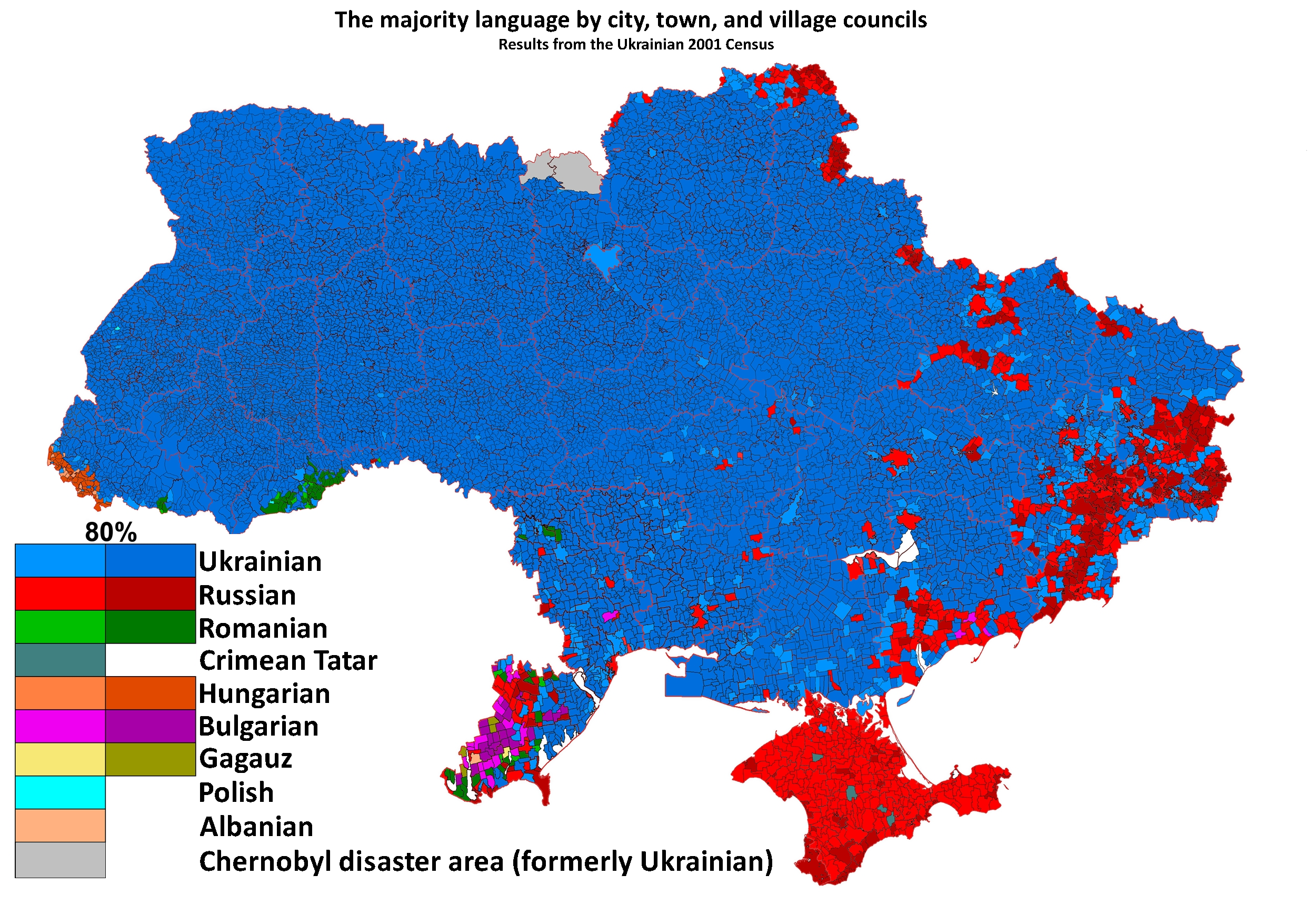
Map of majority declared native language by city, town or village council according to 2001 census

There is a large difference between the numbers of people who report their native language as Russian and people who use Russian as their everyday communication language. The percentage of Russian-speaking citizens is significantly higher in cities than in rural areas across the whole country.

=== 2001 Census ===
According to official data from the 2001 Ukrainian census, the Russian language was native for 29.6% of Ukraine's population (about 14.3 million people). Ethnic Russians formed 56% of the total Russian-native-language population, while the remainder were people of other ethnic background: 5,545,000 Ukrainians, 172,000 Belarusians, 86,000 Jews, 81,000 Greeks, 62,000 Bulgarians, 46,000 Moldovans, 43,000 Tatars, 43,000 Armenians, 22,000 Poles, 21,000 Germans, 15,000 Crimean Tatars.

=== Polls ===
According to data obtained by the "Public Opinion" foundation in 2002, the population of the oblast centres preferred to use Russian (75%). Continuous Russian linguistic areas occupied certain regions of Crimea, Donbas, former Sloboda Ukraine, southern parts of Odesa and Zaporizhzhia oblasts, while Russian linguistic enclaves exist in central and northern Ukraine.

According to a 2004 public opinion poll by the Kyiv International Institute of Sociology, the number of people using Russian language in their homes considerably exceeded the number of those who declared Russian as their native language in the census. According to the survey, Russian is used at home by 43–46% of the population of the country (in other words a similar proportion to Ukrainian) and Russophones made a majority of the population in Eastern and Southern regions of Ukraine:

- Autonomous Republic of Crimea — 77% of the population
- Dnipropetrovsk Oblast — 32%
- Donetsk Oblast — 74.9%
- Luhansk Oblast — 68.8%
- Zaporizhzhia Oblast — 48.2%
- Odesa Oblast — 41.9%
- Kharkiv Oblast — 44.3%
- Mykolaiv Oblast — 29.3%

According to July 2012 polling by Rating, 50% of the surveyed adult residents over 18 years of age considered their native language to be Ukrainian, 29% said Russian, 20% identified both Russian and Ukrainian as their native language, 1% gave another language. 5% could not decide which language is their native one. Almost 80% of respondents stated they did not have any problems using their native language in 2011. 8% stated they had experienced difficulty in the execution (understanding) of official documents; mostly middle-aged and elderly people in South Ukraine and the Donbas.

In the 2000s, Russian dominated in informal communication in the capital of Ukraine, Kyiv. It was also used by a sizeable linguistic minority (4-5% of the total population) in Central and Western Ukraine. 83% of Ukrainians responding to a 2008 Gallup poll preferred to use Russian instead of Ukrainian to take the survey.

According to the survey carried out by Rating in August 2023 in the territory controlled by Ukraine and among the refugees, almost 60% of the polled usually speak Ukrainian at home, about 30% – Ukrainian and Russian, only 9% – Russian. Since March 2022, the use of Russian in everyday life has been noticeably decreasing. For 82% of respondents, Ukrainian was their mother tongue, and for 16%, Russian was their mother tongue. IDPs and refugees living abroad were more likely to use both languages for communication or speak Russian. Nevertheless, more than 70% of IDPs and refugees considered Ukrainian to be their native language. According to Rating, the percentage of Ukrainians who usually speak Ukrainian at home had grown to 62% by July 2025, while Russian was usually spoken by 10%.

Native language (according to annual surveys by the Institute of Sociology of the National Academy of Sciences):
	1994	1995	1996	1997	1998	1999	2000	2001	2002	2003	2004	2005
Russian language	34.7	37.8	36.1	35.1	36.5	36.1	35.1	38.1	34.5	38.1	35.7	34.1

Spoken language in family (at home) (according to annual surveys by the Institute of Sociology of the National Academy of Sciences)
	1994	1995	1996	1997	1998	1999	2000	2001	2002	2003	2004	2005
Mainly Russian	32.4	32.8	33.1	34.5	33.4	33.6	36.0	36.7	33.2	36.0	34.3	36.4
Both Russian and Ukrainian	29.4	34.5	29.6	26.8	28.4	29.0	24.8	25.8	28.0	25.2	26.3	21.6

== Russian language in Ukrainian politics ==
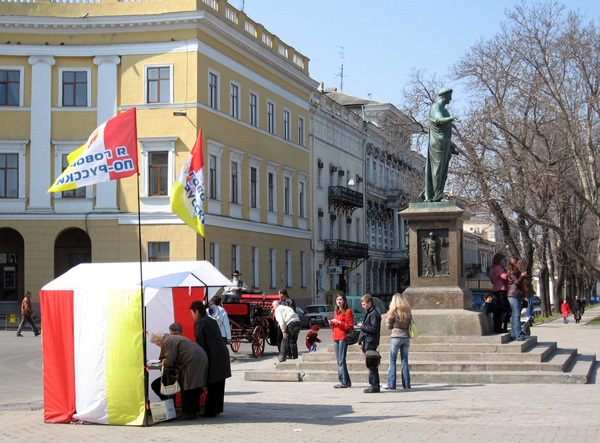
Russophone activists collect signatures in support of introducing the Russian language as regional in Odesa, 2007

The Russian language in Ukraine is recognized (along with all other languages) as the "language of a national minority". Ukrainian is the only state language; every other language is declared to be the "language of a national minority" in the Constitution of Ukraine adopted by the parliament in 1996, but only Russian is explicitly named. Article 10 of the Constitution reads: "In Ukraine, the free development, use and protection of Russian, and other languages of national minorities of Ukraine, is guaranteed". The Constitution declares Ukrainian language as the state language of the country, while other languages spoken in Ukraine are guaranteed constitutional protection, but are not in practice protected from book bans. The Ukrainian language was adopted as the state language by the Law on Languages adopted in Ukrainian SSR in 1989; Russian was specified as the language of communication with the other republics of Soviet Union. Ukraine signed the European Charter on Regional or Minority Languages in 1996, but it was only partially ratified, and only in 2002 by the Parliament

The issue of Russian receiving the status of second official language has been the subject of extended controversial discussion ever since Ukraine became independent in 1991. In every Ukrainian election, many politicians, such as former president Leonid Kuchma, were elected by Ukrainians after making Russian language rights a key part of their platform. Former President of Ukraine, Viktor Yanukovych continued this practice when he was opposition leader. In an interview with Kommersant, during the 2010 Ukrainian presidential election-campaign, he stated that the status of Russian in Ukraine "is too politicized" and said that if elected president in 2010, he would "have a real opportunity to adopt a law on languages, which implements the requirements of the European Charter of regional languages". He implied this law would need 226 votes in the Ukrainian parliament (50% of the votes instead of the 75% of the votes needed to change the constitution of Ukraine). After his early 2010 election as president, Yanukovych stated (on March 9, 2010) "Ukraine will continue to promote the Ukrainian language as its only state language". At the same time, he stressed that it also necessary to develop other regional languages.

In 1994, a referendum took place in the Donetsk Oblast and the Luhansk Oblast, with around 90% supporting the Russian language gaining status of an official language alongside Ukrainian, and for the Russian language to be an official language on a regional level, but it was ignored by Parliament.

Former president Viktor Yushchenko, during his 2004 Presidential campaign, also claimed a willingness to introduce more equality for Russian speakers. His clipping service spread an announcement of his promise to make Russian language proficiency obligatory for officials who interact with Russian-speaking citizens. In 2005 Yushchenko stated that he had never signed this decree project. The controversy was seen by some as a deliberate policy of Ukrainization.

In 2006, the Kharkiv City Rada was the first to declare Russian to be a regional language. Following that, almost all southern and eastern oblasts (Luhansk, Donetsk, Mykolaiv, Kharkiv, Zaporizhzhia, and Kherson oblasts), and many major southern and eastern cities (Sevastopol, Dnipropetrovsk, Donetsk, Yalta, Luhansk, Zaporizhzhia, Kryvyi Rih, Odesa) followed suit. Several courts overturned the decision to change the status of the Russian language in the cities of Kryvyi Rih, Kherson, Dnipropetrovsk, Zaporizhzhia and Mykolaiv while in Donetsk, Mykolaiv and Kharkiv oblasts it was retained.

In August 2012, a law on regional languages entitled any local language spoken by at least a 10% minority to be declared official within that area. Russian was within weeks declared as a regional language in several southern and eastern oblasts and cities. On 23 February 2014, a bill repealing the law was approved by 232 deputies out of 450 but not signed into law by acting-president Oleksandr Turchynov. On 28 February 2018, the Constitutional Court of Ukraine ruled on the matter.

In December 2016, the importation of "anti-Ukrainian" books from Russia was restricted. In February 2017 the Ukrainian government completely banned the commercial importation of books from Russia, which had accounted for up to 60% of all titles sold.

=== Surveys on the status of the Russian language ===
Do you consider it necessary to make Russian an official language in Ukraine? (according to annual surveys by the Institute of Sociology of the National Academy of Sciences):
	1995	1996	1997	1998	1999	2000	2001	2002	2003	2004	2005
Yes	52.0	50.9	43.9	47.6	46.7	44.0	47.4	48.6	47.3	47.5	48.6
Hard to say	15.3	16.1	20.6	15.3	18.1	19.3	16.2	20.0	20.4	20.0	16.8
No	32.6	32.9	35.5	37.0	35.1	36.2	36.0	31.1	31.9	32.2	34.4
No answer	0.1	0.0	0.1	0.1	0.1	0.5	0.4	0.3	0.3	0.3	0.1

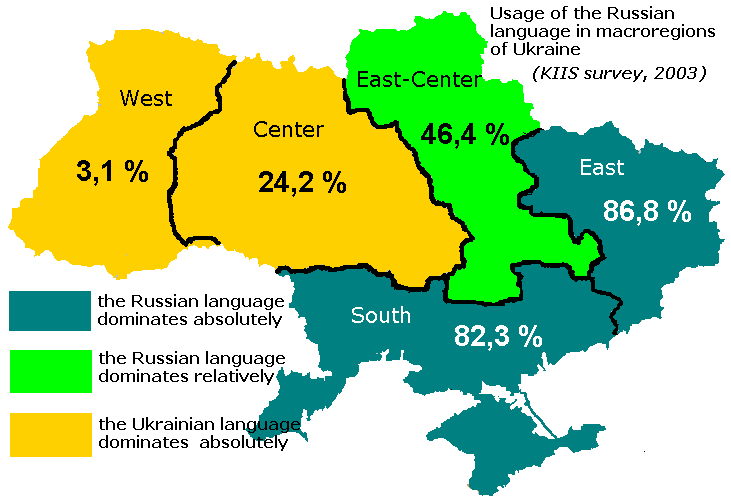
Usage of the Russian language in Ukraine by region (2003)

According to a survey by the Research and Branding Group (June 2006), the majority of respondents supported the decisions of local authorities: 52% largely supported (including 69% of population of eastern oblasts and 56% of southern regions), 34% largely did not support the decisions, 9% – answered "partially support and partially not", 5% had no opinion. According to an all-Ukrainian poll carried out in February 2008 by "Ukrainian Democratic Circle" 15% of those polled said that the language issue should be immediately solved, in November 2009 this was 14.7%; in the November 2009 poll 35.8% wanted both the Russian and Ukrainian language to be state languages.

According to polling by RATING, the level of support for granting Russian the status of a state language decreased (from 54% to 46%) and the number of opponents increased (from 40% to 45%) between 2009 and May 2012; in July 2012 41% of respondents supported granting Russian the status of a state language and 51% opposed it. (In July 2012) among the biggest supporters of bilingualism were residents of the Donets Basin (85%), South Ukraine (72%) and East Ukraine (50%). A further poll conducted by RATING in September–October 2012 found 51% opposed granting official status to the Russian language, whereas 41% supported it. The largest regions of support were Donbas (75%), southern (72%) and eastern (53%), whereas nearly 70% of northern and central Ukraine, and 90% of western Ukraine were in opposition. A survey conducted in February 2015 by the Kyiv International Institute of Sociology found that support for Russian as a state language had dropped to 19% (37% in the south, 31% in Donbas and other eastern oblasts). 52% (West: 44%, Central: 57%; South: 43%; East: 61%) said that Russian should be official only in regions where the majority wanted it and 21% said it should be removed from official use.

A poll conducted in March 2022 by RATING in the territory controlled by Ukraine found that 83% of the respondents believe that Ukrainian should be the only state language of Ukraine. This opinion dominates in all macro-regions, age and language groups. On the other hand, before the war, almost a quarter of Ukrainians were in favour of granting Russian the status of the state language, while today only 7% support it. In peacetime, Russian was traditionally supported by residents of the south and east. But even in these regions, only a third of them were in favour, and after Russia's full-scale invasion, their number dropped by almost half.

=== Other surveys ===
The Russo-Ukrainian director of the Kyiv branch of the Institute of the CIS Countries, Vladimir Vladimirovich Kornilov, presented the results of a poll carried out by the Research & Branding Group in late 2006. As reported by the Russian-language REGNUM News Agency, it found that "68% of Ukrainians are fluent in Russian and 57% are fluent in Ukrainian."

Although a census conducted in Ukrainian showed that Russian speakers comprise about 30% (2001 census), 39% of Ukrainians interviewed in a 2006 survey believed that the rights of Russophones were violated because the Russian language is not official in the country, whereas 38% had the opposite position.

According to a poll carried out by the Social Research Center at the National University of Kyiv-Mohyla Academy in late 2009 ideological issues were ranked third (15%) as reasons to organize mass protest actions (in particular, the issues of joining NATO, the status of the Russian language, the activities of left- and right-wing political groups, etc.); behind economic issues (25%) and problems of ownership (17%). According to a March 2010 survey, forced Ukrainization and Russian language suppression are of concern to 4.8% of the population.

According to 2016-2017 polls by the Kyiv International Institute of Sociology, Rating, and GfK Ukraine, about 1% of respondents across the country, and fewer than 3% of respondents in eastern parts of Ukraine, found the status of the Russian language to be an important political issue. The same 2017 polls indicated 64% support for state policies favoring the usage of the Ukrainian language.

== Use of Russian in specific spheres ==
=== Russian literature of Ukraine ===
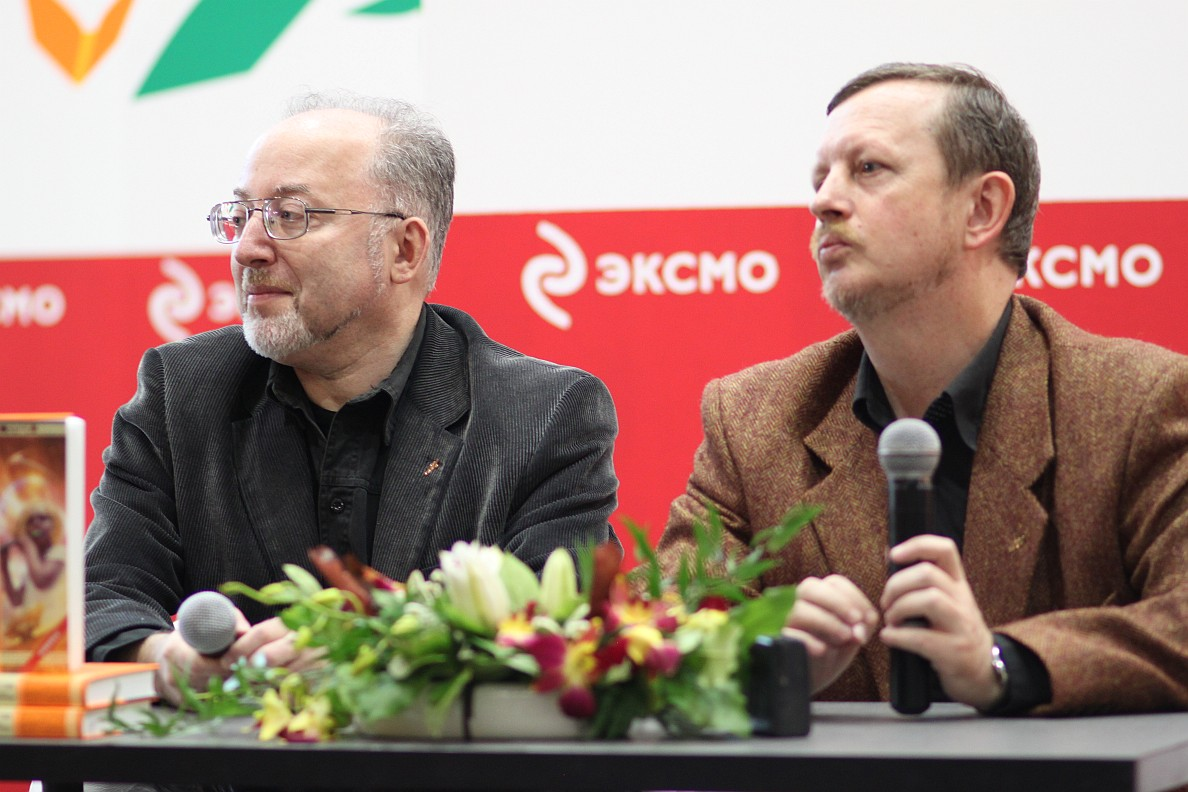
Oleg Ladyzhensky and Dmitry Gromov, two Russophone Ukrainian co-authors, were named Europe's best science fiction writers in 2006 by ESFS.

Historically, many famous writers of Russian literature were born and lived in Ukraine. Nikolai Gogol is probably the most famous example of shared Russo-Ukrainian heritage: Ukrainian by descent, he wrote in Russian, and significantly contributed to culture of both nations. Russian author Mikhail Bulgakov was born in Kyiv, as well as poet Ilya Erenburg. A number of notable Russian writers and poets hailed from Odesa, including Ilya Ilf and Yevgeny Petrov, Anna Akhmatova, Isaak Babel. Russian child poet Nika Turbina was born in Yalta, Crimea.

A significant number of contemporary authors from Ukraine write in Russian. This is especially notable within science fiction and fantasy genres. Kharkiv is considered the "capital city" of Ukrainian sci-fi and fantasy, it is home to several popular Russophone Ukrainian writers, such as H. L. Oldie (pen name for Oleg Ladyzhensky and Dmitry Gromov), Alexander Zorich, Andrei Valentinov, and Yuri Nikitin. Science fiction convention Zvezdny Most (Rus. for "Star Bridge") is held in Kharkiv annually. Russophone Ukrainian writers also hail from Kyiv, those include Marina and Sergey Dyachenko and Vladimir Arenev. Max Frei hails from Odesa, and Vera Kamsha was born in Lviv. Other Russophone Ukrainian writers of sci-fi and fantasy include Vladimir Vasilyev, Vladislav Rusanov, Alexander Mazin and Fyodor Berezin. RBG-Azimuth, Ukraine's largest sci-fi and fantasy magazine, is published in Russian, as well as now defunct Realnost Fantastiki.

Outside science fiction and fantasy, there is also a number of Russophone realist writers and poets. Ukrainian literary magazine Sho listed Alexander Kabanov, Boris Khersonsky, Andrey Polyakov, Andrey Kurkov and Vladimir Rafeyenko as best Russophone Ukrainian writers of 2013.

According to H. L. Oldie, writing in Russian is an easier way for Ukrainian authors to be published and reach a broader audience. The authors say that it is because of Ukraine's ineffective book publishing policy: while Russian publishers are interested in popular literature, Ukrainian publishers rely mostly on grant givers. Many Ukrainian publishers agree and complain about low demand and low profitability for books in Ukrainian, compared to books in Russian.

=== In the media ===
A 2012 study showed that:

- on the radio, 3.4% of songs were in Ukrainian while 60% were in Russian
- over 60% of newspapers, 83% of journals and 87% of books were in Russian
- 28% of TV programs were in Ukrainian, even on state-owned channels

Russian-language programming is sometimes subtitled in Ukrainian, and commercials during Russian-language programs are in Ukrainian on Ukraine-based media.

On March 11, 2014, amidst pro-Russian unrest in Ukraine, the Ukrainian National Council on Television and Radio Broadcasting shut down the broadcast of Russian television channels Rossiya 24, Channel One Russia, RTR Planeta, and NTV Mir in Ukraine. Since 19 August 2014 Ukraine has blocked 14 Russian television channels "to protect its media space from aggression from Russia, which has been deliberately inciting hatred and discord among Ukrainian citizens".

In early June 2015, 162 Russian movies and TV series were banned in Ukraine because they were seen to contain popularization, agitation and/or propaganda for the 2014–15 Russian military intervention in Ukraine (this military intervention is denied by Russia). All movies that feature "unwanted" Russian or Russia-supporting actors were also banned.

==== On the Internet ====
Russian is by far the preferred language on websites in Ukraine (80.1%), followed by English (10.1%), then Ukrainian (9.5%). The Russian language version of Wikipedia is five times more popular within Ukraine than the Ukrainian one, with these numbers matching those for the 2008 Gallup poll cited above (in which 83% of Ukrainians preferred to take the survey in Russian and 17% in Ukrainian.)

While government organizations are required to have their websites in Ukrainian, Ukrainian usage of the Internet is mostly in the Russian language. According to DomainTyper, the top ranking .ua domains are google.com.ua, yandex.ua, ex.ua and i.ua, all of which use the Russian language as default. According to 2013 UIA research, four of the five most popular websites (aside from Google) in Ukraine were Russian or Russophone: those are Vkontakte, Mail.ru, Yandex, and Odnoklassniki. The top Ukrainian language website in this rank is Ukr.net, which was only the 8th most popular, and even Ukr.net uses both languages interchangeably.

On May 15, 2017, Ukrainian president Poroshenko issued a decree that demanded all Ukrainian internet providers to block access to all most popular Russian social media and websites, including VK, Odnoklassniki, Mail.ru, Yandex citing matters of national security in the context of the war in Donbas and explaining it as a response to "massive Russian cyberattacks across the world". On the following day the demand for applications that allowed to access blocked websites skyrocketed in Ukrainian segments of App Store and Google Play. The ban was condemned by Human Rights Watch that called it "a cynical, politically expedient attack on the right to information affecting millions of Ukrainians, and their personal and professional lives", while head of Council of Europe expressed a "strong concern" about the ban.

In January 2016, the ratio of Russian to Ukrainian Wikipedia use in Ukraine was 4.6 times, decreasing to 2.6 times in January 2019, 2.4 times in January 2020, and 2 times in January 2021. In October 2023, the difference in the number of pageviews between the Wikipedias was 10 million (the Ukrainian Wikipedia had 90 million views, while the Russian Wikipedia had 100 million), the lowest ever recorded.

The usage of the Russian language on social media sharply decreased after the beginning of the Russian invasion of Ukraine in February 2022. According to a poll conducted the following December, only 2% of respondents used exclusively Russian on the Internet, while another 4% used mostly Russian. 38% used Ukrainian and Russian equally, 26% used mostly Ukrainian, and another 26% used exclusively Ukrainian. As of October 2023, Ukrainian significantly dominated Russian on Instagram, Twitter, and Facebook, slightly prevailed on TikTok, and almost equaled Russian on YouTube.

=== In education ===
Among private secondary schools, each individual institution decides whether to study Russian or not.

The number of Russian-teaching schools has reduced since Ukrainian independence in 1991 and in 2021 it is much lower than the proportion of Russophones, but still higher than the proportion of ethnic Russians.

The Law on Education formerly granted Ukrainian families (parents and their children) a right to choose their native language for schools and studies. This was changed by a new law in 2017 that only allows the use of Ukrainian in secondary schools and higher.

Higher education institutions in Ukraine generally use Ukrainian as the language of instruction.

According to parliamentarians of the Supreme Council of Crimea, in 2010 90% students of Crimea were studying in Russian language schools. At the same time, only 7% of students in Crimea were studying in Ukrainian language schools. In 2012, the only Ukrainian boarding school (50 pupils) in Sevastopol was closed, and children who would not study in Russian language were to be transferred to a boarding school for children with intellectual disabilities.

=== In courts ===
Since 1 January 2010, court proceedings have been allowed to take place in Russian on mutual consent of parties. Citizens who are unable to speak Ukrainian or Russian are allowed to use their native language or the services of an interpreter.

Article 14 of the 2019 Law of Ukraine "On protecting the functioning of the Ukrainian language as the state language" states:

1. In the courts of Ukraine, proceedings shall be conducted and records shall be kept in the State language.

2. Other languages than the State language may be used in court proceedings in the manner prescribed by the procedural codes of Ukraine and the Law of Ukraine on Judicial System and Status of Judges.

3. Courts shall adopt decisions and make them public in the State language in the manner prescribed by law. Texts of court decisions shall be drafted with regard to the State language standards.

=== In business ===
As of 2008, business affairs in Ukraine were mainly dealt with in Russian. Advanced technical and engineering courses at the university level in Ukraine were taught in Russian, which was changed according to the 2017 law "On Education".

Article 20 of the 2019 Law of Ukraine "On protecting the functioning of the Ukrainian language as the state language" states:

1. No one shall be forced to use a language other than the State language while being at work and performing duties under an employment contract, except when:

a) serving consumers or other customers who are foreigners or stateless persons;

b) drawing up legal, technical, informational and promotional texts or other messages and documents (including verbal ones) addressed to foreigners or stateless persons, legal entities, authorities and officers of foreign states and international organisations.

2. Employment contracts in Ukraine shall be executed in the State language, which shall not preclude the parties thereto from using its translation.

== See also ==
- Russification of Ukraine
- Derussification in Ukraine
- Internationalism or Russification?
- Russians in Ukraine
- Surzhyk
- Russian book ban in Ukraine
- Language ombudsman (Ukraine)
- Law of Ukraine "On protecting the functioning of the Ukrainian language as the state language"
- Chronology of Ukrainian language suppression
- Russia–Ukraine relations

== General Sources ==
- Grenoble, Lenore A. (2003). Language policy in the Soviet Union. Dordrecht; Boston: Kluwer Academic Publishers. ISBN 9781402012983.
