= On the Principles of State Language Policy =

2012 Ukrainian legislation

- Coat of arms of Ukraine

Verkhovna Rada
- Long title: Law of Ukraine 5029-VI "On the Principles of State Language Policy"
- Territorial extent: Ukraine
- Passed by: Presidential decree
- Passed: 3 July 2012
- Effective: 10 August 2012

Legislative history
- Introduced by: Serhii Kivalov, Vadym Kolesnichenko
- First reading: 5 June 2012
- Voting summary: 234 voted for
- Second reading: 3 July 2012
- Voting summary: 248 voted for

Amends
- "On Languages in the Ukrainian SSR"

Amended by
- "On protecting the functioning of the Ukrainian language as the state language"
- Status: Struck down

"On the Principles of State Language Policy" (Ukrainian: Закон України «Про засади державної мовної політики»), also nicknamed the "Kivalov-Kolesnichenko Law" or "KK law" after its proposers, is a Law of Ukraine that expanded the use of regional languages in Ukraine for those with at least 10% usage in a certain region, naming seventeen different languages as eligible, including Russian, Belarusian, Bulgarian, Polish, Hungarian, and Yiddish.

On 7 February 2012, the bill was first introduced by MPs Serhii Kivalov and Vadym Kolesnichenko, and had the registration number 9073.

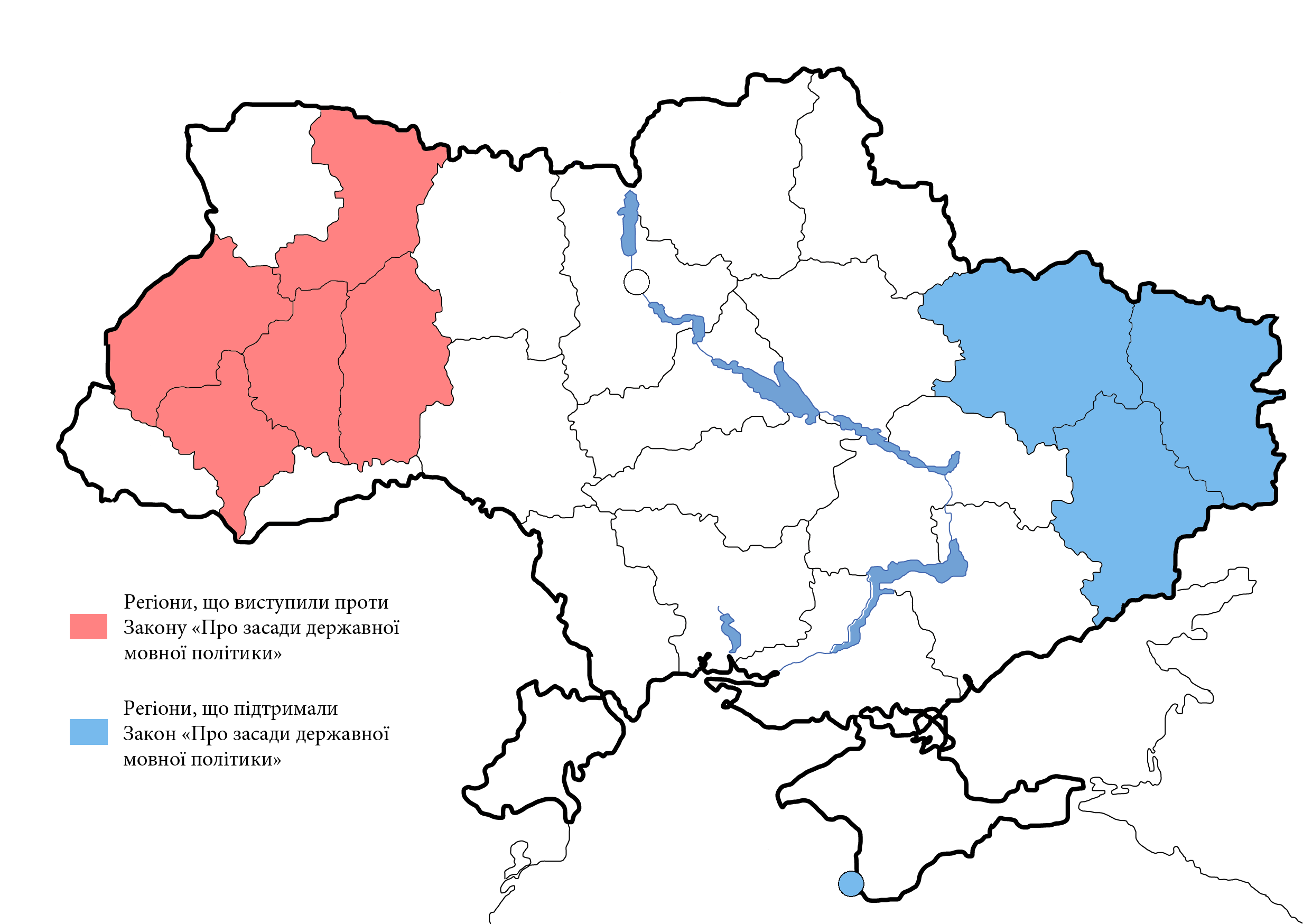
Reaction of the oblast councils on the «language» law (August 2012): Oblast councils that opposed the Law Oblast councils that supported the Law

On 5 June 2012, the Verkhovna Rada adopted the law in first reading with 234 votes in favor, though some claimed only 172 voted in favor. On 3 July, the second reading passed with 248 votes in favor in violation of legislative procedures. On 31 July, despite previous statements against doing so, the chairman of the Verkhovna Rada Volodymyr Lytvyn signed the bill. On 8 August, president Viktor Yanukovych also signed the bill, it came into effect two days later on the 10th. The law repealed the 1989 law "On Languages in the Ukrainian SSR".

On 23 February 2014, the Verkhovna Rada passed a motion repealing this law as invalid. The next day, the High Commissioner on National Minorities from the OSCE Astrid Thors expressed concern that the repeal of this Law could lead to further unrest. The following week, acting president Oleksandr Turchynov announced his refusal to approve the repeal. Later on, newly-elected president Petro Poroshenko also called this repeal attempt a mistake, stressing other ways to improve language policy.

On 29 February 2018, the Constitutional Court of Ukraine declared this law unconstitutional and struck it down. This automatically restored the 1989 law "On Languages in the Ukrainian SSR". The following year, on 19 July 2019, this law was replaced by "On protecting the functioning of the Ukrainian language as the state language".

== See also ==
- Language policy in Ukraine

== Literature ==
- Azhniuk, Bohdan (2017). "Ukrainian Language Legislation and the National Crisis". Harvard Ukrainian Studies. 35 (1/4). Harvard Ukrainian Research Institute: 311–329. ISSN 0363-5570. JSTOR 44983546.
- Csernicskó, István; Fedinec, Csilla (2016). "Four Language Laws of Ukraine". International Journal on Minority and Group Rights. 23 (4). Brill: 560–582. ISSN 1385-4879. JSTOR 26557843.
