= Serhii Kivalov =

Ukrainian politician and jurist (born 1954)

- Сергій Ківалов
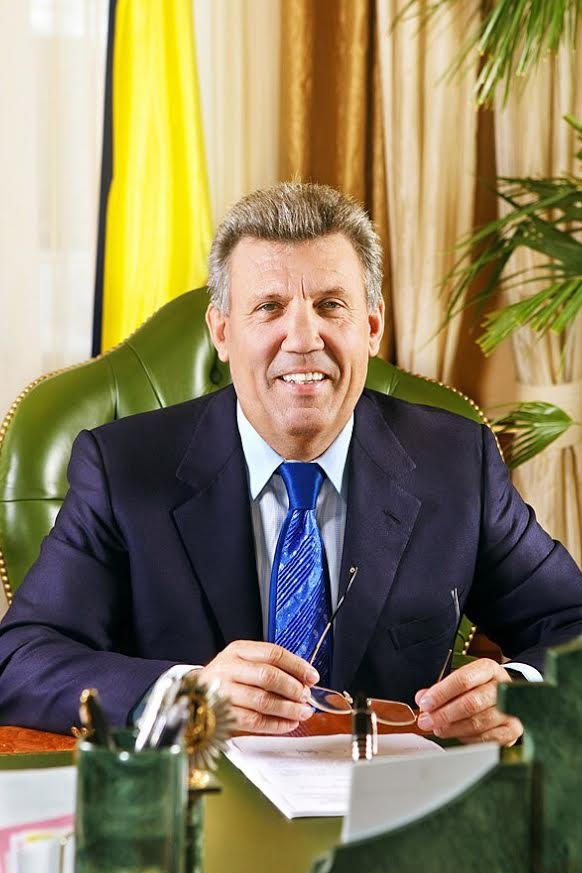
- Kivalov in 2015

People's Deputy of Ukraine
- In office 29 March 1998 – 4 March 2004
- Preceded by: Constituency established (1998); Eduard Gurvits (2002)
- Succeeded by: Anton Kisse
- Constituency: Odesa Oblast, No. 135 (1998–2002); Odesa Oblast, No. 136 (2002–2004)
- In office 25 May 2006 – 21 July 2019
- Preceded by: Constituency re-established (2012)
- Succeeded by: Oleksiy Leonov
- Constituency: Party of Regions, No. 27 (2006–2007); Party of Regions, No. 28 (2007–2012); Odesa Oblast, No. 135 (2012–2019)

4th Chairman of the Central Election Commission of Ukraine
- In office 19 February 2004 – 8 December 2004
- Preceded by: Mykhailo Ryabets
- Succeeded by: Yaroslav Davydovych

2nd Chairman of the High Council of Justice of Ukraine
- In office 25 May 2001 – 10 March 2004
- Preceded by: Valery Yevdokimov
- Succeeded by: Mykola Shelest

Personal details
- Born: 1 May 1954 (age 72) Tiraspol, Moldavian SSR, Soviet Union (now Moldova (Note: Though internationally recognised as part of Moldova, Tiraspol is de facto controlled by and serves as capital of the unrecognised Pridnestrovian Moldavian Republic (better known as Transnistria).))
- Party: Independent
- Other political affiliations: Party of Regions (until 2014)
- Education: Ural State Law University
- Known for: Law of Ukraine "On the Principles of State Language Policy" (bill co-author, 2012)
- Awards: Full cavalier of the Order of Merit, Order of Prince Yaroslav the Wise (4th and 5th classes), Order of Independence, National Order of the Cedar, Order of Friendship, Medal of Pushkin, Medal of Zhukov

Serhii Vasylovych Kivalov (Ukrainian: Сергій Васильович Ківалов; born 1 May 1954) is a Ukrainian politician and jurist who served as the head of Central Election Commission during the 2004 Ukrainian presidential election which led to the Orange Revolution.

Along with Vadym Kolesnichenko, he is the co-author of the bill "On the Principles of State Language Policy" adopted in 2012.

From the 1998 Ukrainian parliamentary election until the 2019 Ukrainian parliamentary election, Kivalov was a member of the Verkhovna Rada. In 2019 he lost re-election as an independent candidate in single-seat constituency 135 (Odesa Oblast).

== Graffiti featuring Serhii Kivalov ==
In December 2015, stencil graffiti featuring a portrait of Sergei Kivalov along with the abbreviation "ПДРХ ПНК" began to appear in Odesa. The style of graffiti, characterized by its use of stencils, was initially employed by underground artists in protest against former Ukrainian president Viktor Yanukovych and later, Russian president Vladimir Putin.

=== Graffiti Image ===
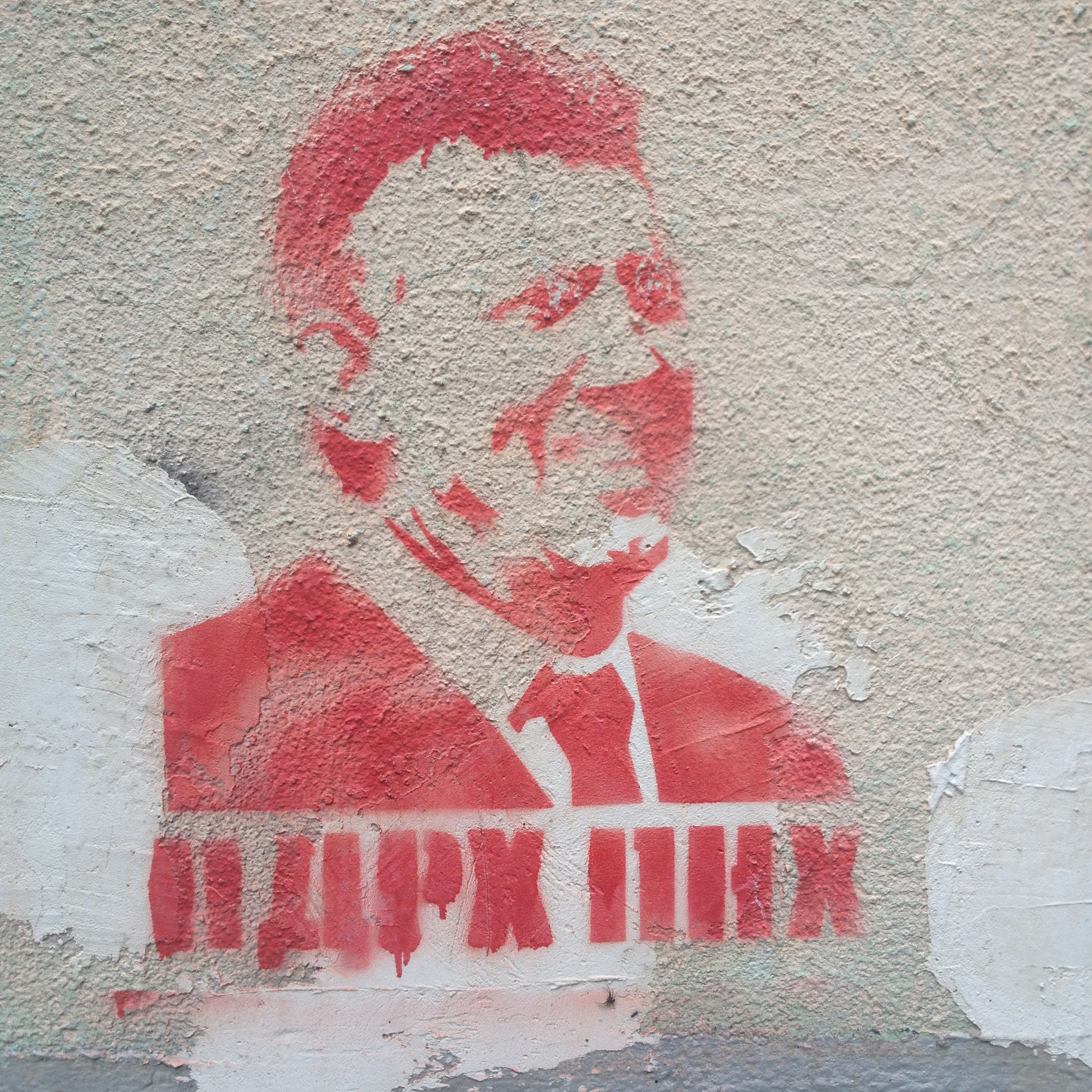
Stencil graffiti of Sergei Kivalov in Odesa, Ukraine, photographed by Jeffreebenet.

=== Sources ===
- May, Oleg (15 December 2015). "Kivalov became the object of partisan graffiti (photo fact)". Culture Meter.
