= Russian book ban in Ukraine =

2016 law restricting imports of Russian books into Ukraine

The Russian book ban in Ukraine took effect on 30 December 2016, when President Petro Poroshenko signed a law that restricted import of books into Ukraine from Russia. This is an element of the ongoing military conflict between Ukraine and Russia.

According to the law, one person can import at most 10 books from Russia without a permit, and unauthorised distribution of books from Russia is also banned.

In light of Russia's continuing 2022 invasion on Ukraine, on 19 June 2022, the Ukrainian Parliament (Verkhovna Rada) adopted a follow-up law. It bans any imports of all book and publishing production from the Russian Federation and Belarus, alongside the Ukrainian territories under Russian occupation. In addition, all imported Russian-language publications from third countries (that is, mainly other post-Soviet states) must be first screened for any anti-Ukrainian content before allowed for distribution and sale in Ukraine. President Zelenskyy signed the law on 22 June 2023.

Another stipulation (entering into force on 1 January 2023) states that, in Ukraine, it is permitted to publish books only in Ukrainian, the languages of Ukraine's indigenous ethnic groups (that is, Crimean Tatar, Karaim and Krymchak), alongside the official languages of the European Union. Furthermore, during the same seating, the Parliament adopted a law that bans importing, staging and broadcasting Russian and Russian-language music in Ukraine.

== Administration ==
The State Committee for Television and Radio-broadcasting, whose duties include enforcing the information policy in Ukraine, manages book permits and was to issue bans on books deemed inappropriate that come "from territory of the aggressor state and from the temporarily occupied territory of Ukraine". Printed matter that requires permits includes books, brochures, children's books including coloring books, as well as maps, atlases, and globes. Each permit is to be entered into the state register and is valid for at most 5 years. Bans are based on evaluations by a council of experts and may be contested.

== History ==
The law was introduced in the Verkhovna Rada (the Ukrainian parliament) in September 2016. It was in spirit the 2015 ban of 38 books from Russia with the purpose of "safeguarding Ukrainian citizens against the use of information warfare and disinformation methods, against the spread of hate ideology, fascism, xenophobia and separatism". Among banned were books by Russian nationalists Alexander Dugin, Eduard Limonov and Sergei Glazyev.

Russian books then accounted for some 60% of the market. Bookselling experts predicted considerable disruption, shortages, and the growth of the book black market.

In August 2017, the Committee banned the import of two novels of Boris Akunin and memoirs of Vladimir Vysotsky, published by a Moscow-based publishing company Zakharov. In December 2018, it banned the import of children's books about Russian epic bogatyrs, as well as some memoirs and historical books, also printed in Russia.

In September 2018, Lviv Regional Council banned public use of Russian-language books, films and songs in the region until Russia's withdrawal from Ukraine. The ban was overturned in January 2019 by the Lviv District Court of First Instance, although part of it was confirmed by the Eighth Administrative Court of Appeal in May 2019. The Supreme Court of Ukraine ruled on 15 August 2019 that the moratorium on the public use of Russian-language cultural products in the Lviv Oblast was lawful. The moratorium was still in force as of February 2022.

In 2022, a Verkhovna Rada committee announced that 11 million copies of Russian-language books, and a total of 19 million books, had been removed from libraries.
