= Chronology of Ukrainian language suppression actions =

The chronology of Ukrainian language suppression presents a list of administrative actions aimed at limiting the influence and importance of the Ukrainian language.

== Language situation in Ukrainian lands before the 19th century ==
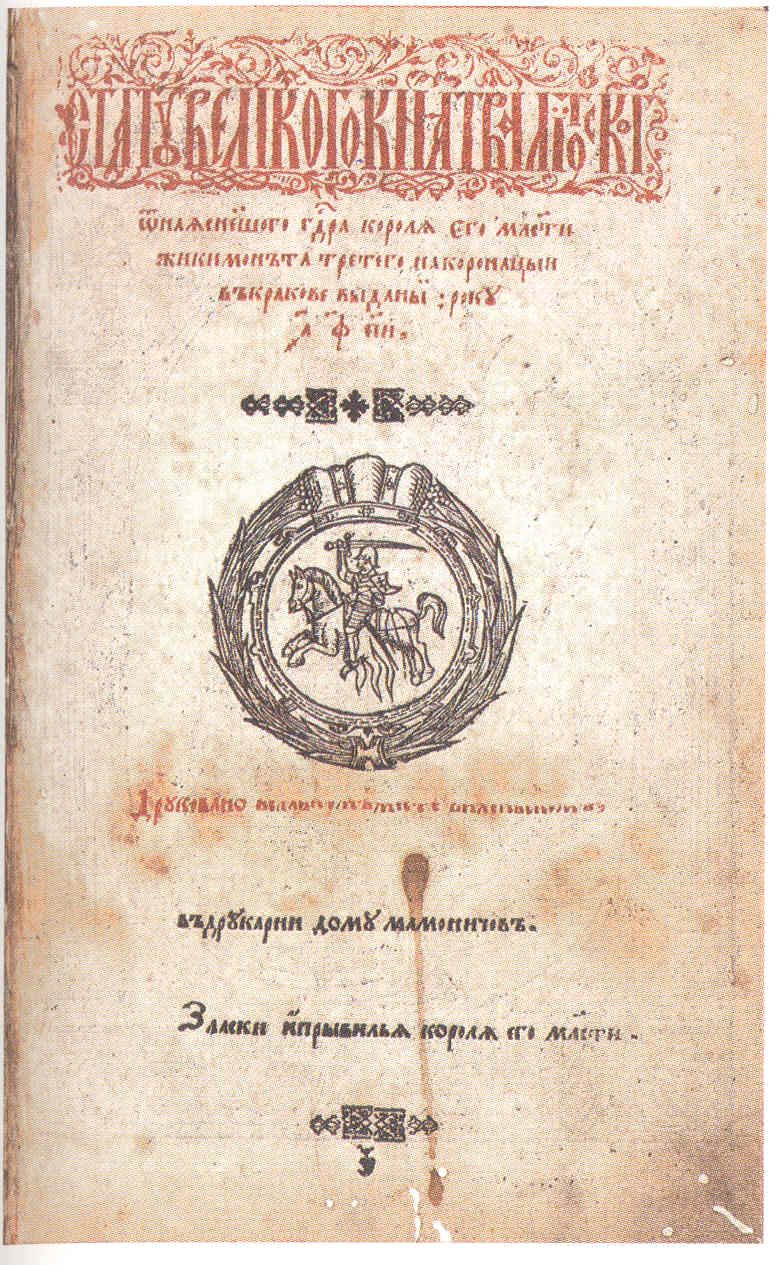
The first page of the Third Lithuanian Statute (1588), written in Ruthenian (Old Ukrainian)

Before the Russian rule, there were several written languages in Ukraine. Religious texts were dominated by the Ukrainian variant of Church Slavonic (also called Meletian, named after the reforms of Meletius Smotrytsky, the archbishop of Polotsk). Following the Polish annexation of the Galician part of the Kingdom of Galicia–Volhynia, first Latin and then the Polish language were introduced as languages of administration as early as the 15th century.

The polonization of the Ukrainian elites led to the use of Polish in other areas, and in the 17th century it became the main language of religious polemics. Ukrainians who did not undergo language polonisation used Church Slavonic in high-ranking texts (liturgical, theological, dramatic texts, and poetry). Literart Ruthenian, known as prosta mova, was used in tales and private documents. It initially developed in the Belarusian territories and had many features of the spoken Belarusian language, but over time it took over the features of the local language in the Ukrainian territories, and also borrowed much from Church Slavonic and Polish. The language shaped in this way became the language of administration in the Cossack Hetmanate, it also began to be used as the language of literature, became standardized and moved away from the spoken language.

At the end of the 18th century the Ukrainian writer and social activist Ivan Kotliarevsky initiated the process of the formation of the modern literary Ukrainian language, based on south-eastern dialects and prosta mova. Restrictions imposed by the Russian government caused the development of the Ukrainian language to move to western Ukraine, which led to changes in the language, called Galicianisms.

The systematic suppression of the Ukrainian language by Russia began with the conquest of Left-bank Ukraine (1654–1667) and the liquidation of the Cossack Hetmanate and the Zaporozhian Sich in 1764 and 1775. There were no similar administrative obstacles to the development of the Ukrainian literary language in western Ukraine, which was part of the Austrian Empire, but due to its inferior status (the official languages were German and Polish) and the lack of a Ukrainian-speaking intelligentsia, the development of the Ukrainian language was hindered.

== Chronology ==
=== 17th–18th century ===
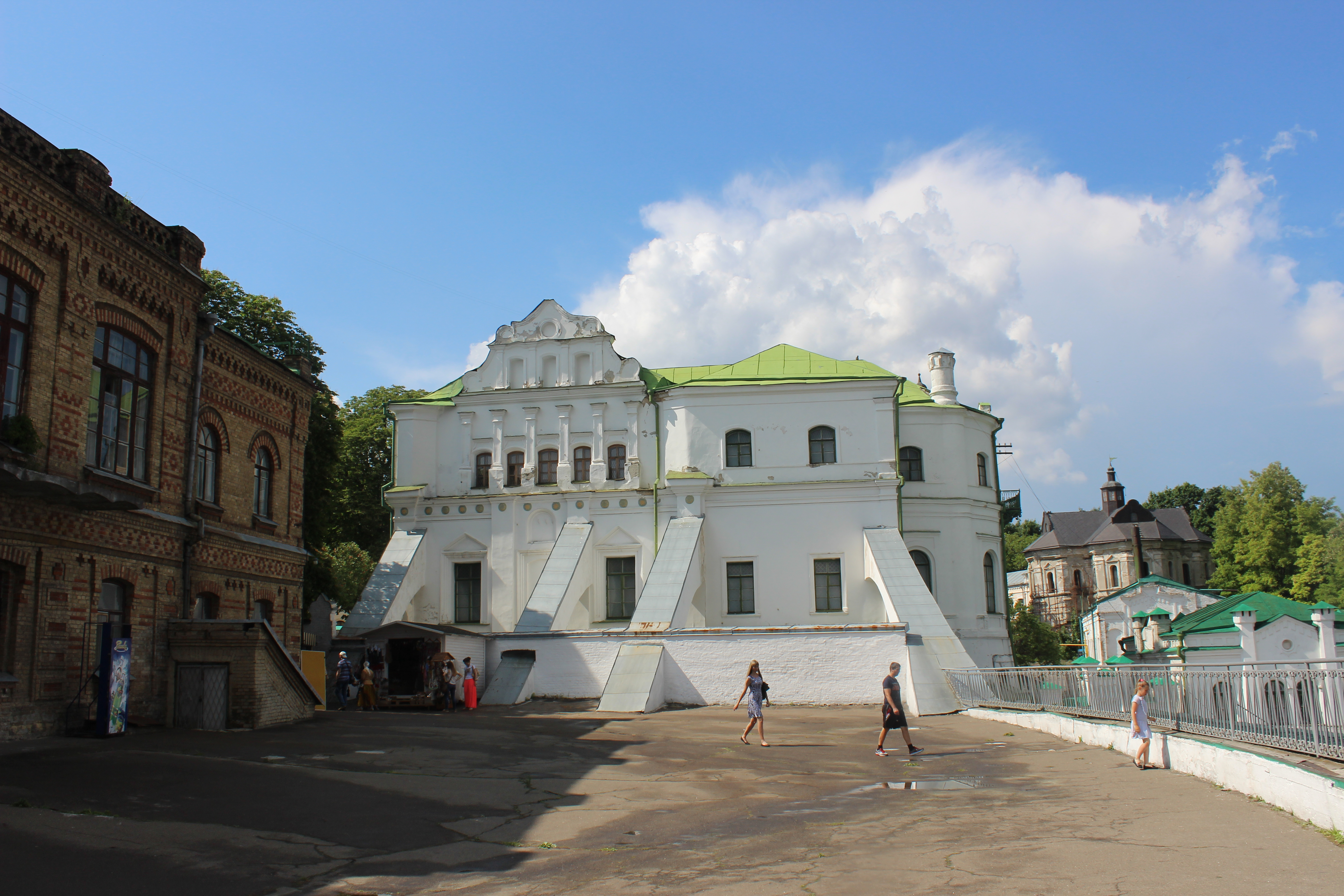
The printing house of the Pechersk Lavra in Kyiv

- 1620 – Patriarch Filaret of Moscow pronounces an anathema that was to last until the end of the century upon "books of Lithuanian imprint" (meaning Ukrainian and Belarusian), practically the only secular books available in Russia.
- 1693 – Patriarch Adrian of Moscow allows only brief works to be printed in the "local dialect," bans their distribution outside the Ukrainian eparchies. He was following the teaching of Patriarch Joachim, who introduced an obligatory doctrine, repressing any peculiarities, including Ukrainian recension of Church Slavonic and about 300 books published in Kyiv throughout the 17th century.
- 1720 – Peter I prohibits the printing house of Chernihiv and the printing house of the Pechersk Lavra in Kyiv from printing any books, except religious books, and those only using the "Great Russian language", by which one should essentially understand the Russian version of Church Slavonic. In practice, this means a ban on using the Ukrainian redaction of Church Slavonic in print.
- 1766 – the Most Holy Synod, governing body of the Russian Orthodox Church, orders the printing houses of the Pechersk Lavra and Chernihiv to stop sending requests for publication of new books, and instead print only those previously printed in Moscow, without changing their content or language.

In 1765–1786, the administrative language of the Hetmanate was gradually Russified, it led to the complete adoption of Russian as the language of administration of Ukrainian lands in place of the Ruthenian language at the end of the period. As a result, the Ruthenian language was limited to private use and to works not designed for printing.

=== 19th century ===
- 1863 – Circular issued by Russia's minister of internal affair Pyotr Valuyev prohibiting censors from giving permission to the publication of Ukrainian spiritual and popular educational literature.
- 1861 – a July 26 resolution by the Austrian State Ministry allows reading instruction in the native language.
- 1864 – adoption of the Charter of the primary school at which education was to be conducted only in Russian.
- 1866 – the December 31 Diet of Galicia and Lodomeria resolution gives the right to decide on the language of instruction in elementary schools to the people and institutions that maintain the school. In the case of public schools, this decision was made by the local authority, when the composition of the school was mixed the school had to be bilingual (the resolution was introduced on 22 June 1867).
- 1867 – Austrian December Constitution guarantees all residents of Cisleithania the right to education in their native language.
- 1869 – Polish language replaces German as the official language of education and of the administration in Austrian Kingdom of Galicia and Lodomeria.
- 1876 – Alexander II's Ems decree banning the printing and importing from abroad of any text in Ukrainian, with exceptions of belles lettres and historical records, it also banned stage performances, public recitations and schooling in Ukrainian, as well as ordering the removal of all Ukrainian books from school libraries. Teachers that were suspected of Ukrainophilism were to be transferred outside of Ukraine.
- 1881 – the modification of the Ems Decree allowed the use of Ukrainian with the Russian alphabet in dictionaries, as well as stage performances by permission of local governors.

=== 20th century ===
- 1903 – the governor-general of Kyiv, Mikhail Dragomirov, permits the printing of fiction in Ukrainian, with the use of Russian alphabet in Kievskaia starina.
- 1905 – formal removal of the bans on Ukrainian publications in Russia.
- 1911 – resolution VIIth congress of the nobility in Moscow's only Russian-language education and the inadmissibility of the use of other languages in schools in Russia.
- 1913 – Ukrainian banned from all public schools in Alberta, Canada, home to the largest Ukrainian diaspora community in the New World at that time.
- 1914 – prohibition of celebrating the 100th anniversary of Taras Shevchenko, the decree of Nicholas II prohibition of the Ukrainian press.
- 1914, 1916 – Russification campaign in western Ukraine, the prohibition of the Ukrainian word, education, church.
- 1922 – part of the proclamation of the Central Committee of the RCP (b), and the Communist Party (b) the "theory" of the struggle between the two cultures in Ukraine – city (Russian) and peasant (Ukrainian), which should win the first one.
- 1924 – law of the Republic of Poland on limiting the use of the Ukrainian language in the administration, judiciary, education subservient to the Polish lands.
- 1924 – Kingdom of Romania law on the obligations of all the "Romanians" who "lost their mother language," to educate children only in Romanian schools.
- 1925 – Ukrainian final closure of the "secret" of the university in Lviv.
- 1926 – Stalin's letter to "Comrade Kaganovich and other members of the Politburo of the Central Committee of the CP (B) U with the sanction of the struggle against the "national bias", the beginning harassment of "Ukrainization".
- 1933 – Stalin's telegram to stop "Ukrainization".
- 1933 – abolition in Romania Ministerial Decree of 31 December 1929, which permits a few hours a week of the Ukrainian language in schools with a majority of students with the Ukrainians.
- 1934 – a special order of the Ministry of Education of Romania's dismissal "for the hostile attitude of the State and the Romanian people" of all Ukrainian teachers who demanded the return to school of Ukrainian.
- 1958 – enshrined in Art. 20 Principles of Legislation of the USSR and the Union Republics on Public Education of the situation on the free choice of language learning, the study of all languages except Russian, at the request of students' parents.
- 1960–1980 – mass closure of Ukrainian schools in Poland and Romania.
- 1970 – order of the Ministry of Education of the USSR on academic thesis defense only in Russian language.
- 1972 – prohibition of party bodies to celebrate the anniversary of the museum Kotlyarevskyi in Poltava.
- 1973 – prohibition to celebrate the anniversary of Ivan Kotlyarevsky's Eneida.
- 1984 – order of the Ministry of Culture of the USSR on the transfer proceedings in all the museums of the Soviet Union, the Russian language.
- 1984 – back to the USSR payments increased by 15% of the salary for teachers of the Russian language in comparison with teachers of Ukrainian language.
- 1989 – the decree of the Central Committee of the CPSU on "legislative consolidation of the Russian language as a nationwide".
- 1990 – adoption by the Supreme Soviet of the USSR Law on the languages of the peoples of the USSR, where the Russian language was granted official status.

=== 21st century ===
- 2012 – the Verkhovna Rada passed the law "On the Principles of State Language Policy", which steadily narrowed the scope of use of the Ukrainian language in most of the regions of Ukraine.
- 2014 – the Ukrainian language has been suppressed in Russia-occupied Crimea, so-called Luhansk People's Republic, and so-called Donetsk People's Republic (see Occupied territories of Ukraine).
- 2022 – after the Russian invasion of Ukraine, high-level Russian officials repeatedly denying the existence of Ukrainian language (and Ukrainian culture and national identity) is cited as part of incitement to genocide in a report by more than thirty experts. Also Russians reportedly burn Ukrainian books en masse on occupied territories, and brought their teachers to the occupied territories to teach propaganda history.

== See also ==
- Allegations of genocide of Ukrainians in the Russian invasion of Ukraine
- Russification of Ukraine
- Derussification in Ukraine
- Linguistic discrimination

== Sources ==
- Danylenko, Andrii (2019). "Linguistic russification in Russian Ukraine. Languages, imperial models, and policies". Russian Linguistics. 43: 19–39. doi:10.1007/s11185-018-09207-1. S2CID 255008699.
- Flier, Michael; Graziosi, Andrea (2018). "The Battle for Ukrainian: An Introduction". Harvard Ukrainian Studies. 35 (1–4): 11–30.
- Majorek, Czesław (1968). "Ustrój galicyjskiego szkolnictwa w czasie walki o autonomię i w okresie kampanii rezolucyjnej (1860–1873)" [The structure of the Galician education system during the struggle for autonomy and the resolution campaign (1860–1873)] (PDF). Rocznik Naukowo-Dydaktyczny WSP W Krakowie (in Polish). 32. The University of Krakow.
- Shevelov, George Y. (1989). The Ukrainian Language in the First Half of the Twentieth Century (1900-1941): Its State and Status. Harvard University Press. ISBN 9780916458300.
- Shevelov, George (1981). "Evolution of the Ukrainian Literary Language". In Rudnytsky, Ivan (ed.). Rethinking Ukrainian History. Edmonton, Canada: Canadian Institute of Ukrainian Studies. ISBN 978-0-920862-12-4. OCLC 1157053847.
