= Mac gaming =

Video gaming on Mac operating systems

Mac gaming refers to the use of video games on Macintosh personal computers. In the 1990s, Apple computers did not attract the same level of video game development as Microsoft Windows computers due to the high popularity of Windows and, for 3D gaming, Microsoft's DirectX technology. In recent years, the introduction of Mac OS X and support for Intel processors has eased the porting of many games, including 3D games through use of OpenGL, and more recently, Apple's own Metal API. Virtualization technology and the Boot Camp dual-boot utility also permit the use of Windows and its games on Macintosh computers. Today, a growing number of popular games run natively on macOS, though as of early 2019, a majority still require the use of Microsoft Windows.

macOS Catalina (and later) eliminated support for 32-bit games, including those compatible with older versions of macOS.

== Early game development on the Mac ==
Prior to the release of the Macintosh 128K, the first Macintosh computer, marketing executives at Apple feared that including a game in the finished operating system would aggravate the impression that the graphical user interface made the Mac toy-like. Also, the limited amount of RAM in the 128K meant that fitting a game into the operating system would be very difficult. Eventually, Andy Hertzfeld created a Desk Accessory called Puzzle that occupied only 600 bytes of memory, was deemed small enough to be safely included in the operating system, and was shipped with the Mac when released in 1984. With Puzzle, the first computer game designed specifically for a mouse, the Macintosh became the first computer with a game in its ROM. Puzzle would remain a part of the Mac OS for the next ten years, until being replaced with Jigsaw, a jigsaw puzzle game included as part of System 7.5.

During the development of the Mac, a chess game similar to Archon based on Alice in Wonderland was shown to the development team. The game was written by Steve Capps for the Apple Lisa computer, but could be easily ported to the Macintosh. The completed game was shown at the Mac's launch and released a few months later under the title Through the Looking Glass, but Apple failed to put much marketing effort into ensuring its success and the game was not a top seller.

By the mid-1980s most computer companies avoided the term "home computer" because of its association with the image of, as Compute! wrote, "a low-powered, low-end machine primarily suited for playing games". Apple's John Sculley, for example, denied that his company sold home computers; rather, he said, Apple sold "computers for use in the home". In 1990 the company reportedly refused to support joysticks on its low-cost Macintosh LC and IIsi computers to prevent customers from considering them as "game machine"s. Apart from a developer discount on Apple hardware, support for games developers was minimal. Game development on the Macintosh nonetheless continued, with titles such as Dark Castle (1986), Microsoft Flight Simulator (1986) and SimCity (1989), though mostly games for the Mac were developed alongside those for other platforms. Notable exceptions were Myst (1993), developed on the Mac (in part using HyperCard) and only afterwards ported to Windows, Pathways into Darkness, which spawned the Halo franchise, The Journeyman Project, Lunicus, Spaceship Warlock, and Jump Raven. As Apple was the first manufacturer to ship CD-ROM drives as standard equipment (on the Macintosh IIvx and later Centris models), many of the early CD-ROM based games were initially developed for the Mac, especially in an era of often confusing Multimedia PC standards. In 1996 Next Generation reported that, while there had been Mac-only games and PC ports with major enhancements on Macintosh, "until recently, most games available for the Mac were more or less identical ports of PC titles".

=== Pippin ===
The Apple Pippin (also known as the Bandai Pippin) was a multimedia player based on the Power Mac that ran a cut-down version of the Mac OS designed, among other things, to play games. Sold between 1996 and 1998 in Japan and the United States, it was not a commercial success, with fewer than 42,000 units sold and fewer than a thousand games and software applications supported.

=== Attempts by Apple to promote gaming on Mac ===
The co-founder of Apple, Steve Jobs, disliked video games, but Apple has at times attempted to market the platform for gaming. In 1996, the company released a series of game-enabling APIs called Game Sprockets. In April 1999, Jobs gave an interview with the UK-based Arcade magazine to promote the PowerPC G3-based computers Apple were selling with then new ATI Rage 128 graphics cards, and describing how Apple was "trying to build the best gaming platform in the world so developers are attracted to write for it" and "trying to leapfrog the PC industry".

A 2007 interview with Valve's Gabe Newell included the question of why his company was keeping their games and gaming technology "a strictly Windows project". Newell answered:

We tried to have a conversation with Apple for several years, and they never seemed to... well, we have this pattern with Apple, where we meet with them, people there go "wow, gaming is incredibly important, we should do something with gaming". And then we'll say, "OK, here are three things you could do to make that better", and then they say OK, and then we never see them again. And then a year later, a new group of people show up, who apparently have no idea that the last group of people were there, and never follow through on anything. So, they seem to think that they want to do gaming, but there's never any follow through on any of the things they say they're going to do. That makes it hard to be excited about doing games for their platforms.

In 2015, Apple brought to the Mac its low-level graphics API Metal, which was introduced a year earlier for iOS. As of 2026 Metal has largely superseded OpenGL on the Mac platform and enable game performance competitive with Vulkan or Direct3D 12. OpenGL support was deprecated in macOS 10.14. With OpenGL support now being done through a OpenGL to Metal translation layer.

== Original Mac games ==
Currently most notable Mac games are ports. A popular game which was originally developed for the Macintosh was 1993's Myst, by Cyan. It was ported to Windows in 1994, and Cyan's later games were released simultaneously for both platforms with the exception of Uru: Ages Beyond Myst, which was Windows-only until a Mac-compatible re-release in 2007. From the 1980s an atmospheric air hockey game Shufflepuck Café (Broderbund, 1989) and a graphical adventure game Shadowgate (Mindscape, 1987) were among the most prominent games developed first for Macintosh and later ported for other platforms.

Another notable Mac game in the mid-1990s was Marathon. It was released in the wake of DOOM, but gained notoriety by appearing on the Mac before the official port of DOOM. Bungie would port the second in the series, Marathon 2: Durandal, to the Windows platform, where it met with some success. They also ported Myth and Oni to Windows.

Some Macintosh focused developers have include Casady & Greene, Storm Impact, Ambrosia Software, Pangea Software, Freeverse Software, Koingo Software, Delta Tao Software, Silicon Beach Software, and Spiderweb Software, as well as casual game producers such as Strange Flavour, Awem Games, Big Fish Games, Pop Cap Games, MumboJumbo, Sandlot Games and Melsoft Games.

== Windows games ==
A particular problem for companies attempting to port Windows games to the Macintosh is licensing middleware. Middleware is off-the-shelf software that handles certain aspects of games, making it easier for game creators to develop games in return for paying the middleware developer a licensing fee. However, since the license the Mac porting house obtains from the game creator does not normally include rights to use the middleware as well, the Mac porting company must either license the middleware separately or attempt to find an alternative. Examples of middleware include the Havok physics engine and the GameSpy internet-based multiplayer gaming client.

Because of the smaller market, companies developing games for the Mac usually seek a lower licensing fee than Windows developers. When the middleware company refuses such terms porting that particular Windows game to the Mac may be uneconomical and engineering a viable alternative within the available budget impossible. As a result, some popular games which use the Havok engine have not yet been ported to the Macintosh.

In other cases, workaround solutions may be found. In the case of GameSpy, one workaround is to limit Mac gamers to play against each other but not with users playing the Windows version. However, in some cases, GameSpy has been reverse-engineered and implemented into the Mac game, so that it is able to network seamlessly with the Windows version of the game.

=== In-house porting ===
Only a few companies have developed or continue to develop games for both the Mac and Windows platforms. Notable examples of these are TransGaming, Aspyr, Big Fish Games, Panic Inc., Blizzard Entertainment, Broderbund, Linden Lab, and Microsoft. Those creating the Mac version have direct access to the original programmers in case any questions or concerns arise about the source code. This increases the likelihood that the Mac and Windows versions of a game will launch concurrently or nearly so, as many obstacles inherent in the third-party porting process are avoided. If carried out simultaneously with game development, the company can release hybrid discs, easing game distribution and largely eliminating the shelf space problem.

Among the Mac versions of popular Windows games that were developed in-house are Diablo, Microsoft Flight Simulator, Second Life, Stubbs the Zombie, Call of Duty 4, and World of Warcraft.

=== Third-party porting ===
Most high-budget games that come to the Macintosh are originally created for Microsoft Windows and ported to the Mac operating system by one of a relatively small number of porting houses. Among the most notable of these are Aspyr, Feral Interactive, MacSoft, Red Marble Games, Coladia Games, The Omni Group, and MacPlay. A critical factor for the financial viability of these porting houses is the number of copies of the game sold; a "successful" title may sell only 50,000 units.

The licensing deal between the original game developer and the porting house may be a flat one-time payment, a percentage of the profits from the Mac game's sale, or both. While this license gives the porting house access to artwork and source code, it does not normally cover middleware such as third-party game engines. Modifying the source code to the Macintosh platform may be difficult as code for games is often highly optimized for the Windows operating system and Intel-compatible processors. The latter presented an obstacle in previous years when the Macintosh platform utilized PowerPC processors due to the difference in endianness between the two types of processors, but as today's Macintosh computers employ Intel processors as well, the obstacle has been mitigated somewhat. One example of common work for a porting house is converting graphics instructions targeted for Microsoft's DirectX graphics library to instructions for the OpenGL library; DirectX is favored by most Windows game developers, but is incompatible with the Macintosh.

Due to the time involved in licensing and porting the product, Macintosh versions of games ported by third-party companies are usually released anywhere from three months to more than a year after their Windows-based counterparts. For example, the Windows version of Civilization IV was released on October 25, 2005, but Mac gamers had to wait eight months until June 30, 2006, for the release of the Mac version.

=== Boot Camp ===
In April 2006 Apple released a beta version of Boot Camp, a product which allows Intel-based Macintoshes to boot directly into Windows XP or Windows Vista. The reaction from Mac game developers and software journalists to the introduction of Boot Camp has been mixed, ranging from assuming the Mac will be dead as a platform for game development to cautious optimism that Mac owners will continue to play games within Mac OS rather than by rebooting to Windows. The number of Mac ports of Windows games released in 2006 was never likely to be very great, despite the steadily increasing number of Mac users.

Boot Camp is no longer an option for new Apple computers powered by Apple silicon M-series chips. This method continues to be available for older Intel-based Macs.

=== Emulation and virtualization ===
Over the years there have been a number of emulators for the Macintosh that allowed it to run MS-DOS or Windows software, most notably RealPC, SoftPC, SoftWindows, and Virtual PC. Although more or less adequate for business applications, these programs have tended to deliver poor performance when used for running games, particularly where high-end technologies like DirectX were involved.

Since the introduction of the Intel processor into the Macintosh platform, Windows virtualization software such as Parallels Desktop for Mac and VMware Fusion have been seen as more promising solutions for running Windows software on the Mac operating system.In some ways they are better solutions than Boot Camp, as they do not require rebooting the machine. VMware Fusion's public beta 2 supports hardware-accelerated 3D graphics which utilize the DirectX library up to version 9. Parallels Desktop for Mac version 3.0 introduced support for GPU acceleration, allowing Mac users to play Windows-based games. Parallels Desktop 15 introduced support for DirectX 11, allowing for more modern 3D titles. It is rumored that a future version of Parallels Desktop will include support for DirectX 12 thanks to new features included in Apple's Metal (API) version 3.

==== Wine-based projects ====
TransGaming Technologies has developed a product called Cider which is a popular method among publishers to port games to Mac. Cider's engine enables publishers and developers to target Mac OS X. It shares much of the same core technology as TransGaming's Linux Portability Engine, Cedega. Public reception of games ported with Cider is mixed, due to inconsistency of performance between titles; because of this, "Ciderized" games are neither seen as the work of cross-platform development, nor as native, optimized ports. Both Cider and Cedega are based on Wine. Electronic Arts announced their return to the Mac, publishing various titles simultaneously on both Windows and Mac, using Cider.

An open source Wine-based project called Wineskin allows anyone to attempt to port games to Mac OS X since 2010. It uses all open source components and is open source itself. Its technology is very similar to what TransGaming does with Cider, but it is free to use to anyone. Wineskin creates self-contained ("clickable") Mac Applications out of the installation. The "wrappers" that can be made from this are often shared with friends or others. Legal versions of games can then be installed easily into the shared wrapper and then the final result works like a normal Mac app. Wineskin is mainly only used in "Hobbyist Porting" and not professional porting, but some professional game companies have used it in major releases. Since the end of 2014, there is a PaulTheTall.com app called Porting Kit which automatically creates ready-to-use Wineskin wrappers for some specific games.

CodeWeavers' CrossOver products use a compatibility layer to translate Windows' application instructions to the native Macintosh operating system, without the need to run Windows. CrossOver is built from the Wine project and adds a graphical frontend to the process of installing and running the Windows applications through Wine. CodeWeavers is an active supporter of Wine and routinely shares programming code and patches back to the project.

PlayOnMac is a free version of the same technology, also based on Wine.

A list of Wine-compatible Windows software, including over 5,000 games and how well each individual game works with Wine can be found at appdb.winehq.org. 1,500 games are listed as "Platinum", which means they work "out-of-the-box", while 1,400 more are listed as "Gold", meaning they require some tweaking of the installation to run flawlessly.

== Linux gaming and free software games ==
Since the mid-2000s Mac gaming became more intertwined with that of another Unix-like platform: Linux gaming. This trend began when Linux gained Mac-style porting houses, the first of which was Loki Software and later Linux Game Publishing. Linux porters born from this new industry were also commonly hired as Mac porters, often releasing games for both systems. This includes game porters like Ryan C. Gordon, who brought Unreal Tournament 2003 and 2004 to Linux and Mac, and companies like Hyperion Entertainment, who primarily supported AmigaOS as well as Mac and Linux, or RuneSoft, a German publisher that has done ports for Linux Game Publishing.

Mac-focused porter Aspyr also started releasing titles for Linux following the release of Steam for that system in 2012, starting with Civilization V. Feral Interactive also released XCOM: Enemy Unknown and Middle-earth: Shadow of Mordor for Linux. Virtual Programming, Team17, and Devolver Digital have published for the two systems.

Indie game development and digital distribution have also been conducive to intertwining, starting with developers like Wolfire Games (Lugaru, Overgrowth), Frictional Games (Penumbra, Amnesia), 2D Boy (World of Goo), Sillysoft Games (Lux), Kot-in-Action Creative Artel (Steel Storm), Gaslamp Games (Dungeons of Dredmor), Double Fine (Psychonauts, Brütal Legend), Klei Entertainment (Shank, Mark of the Ninja), and Basilisk Games (Eschalon) supplying multiple native versions. id Software was also a pioneer in both Mac and Linux gaming, with ports of their games once done by Timothee Besset. Illwinter Game Design and Introversion Software are also notable for supporting these platforms, as did the initial Humble Indie Bundles. Multi-platform games are now often found on Steam, GOG.com and itch.io.

Open source video games have also proved modestly popular on the Mac. Due to the free software nature of the system, development of such titles mostly begins on Linux; afterwards, major games are typically ported to Mac and Microsoft Windows thanks to using cross-platform libraries like SDL. Mac has less mainstream games than Windows and as a result, free games have had more of an impact on the platform. Notable free games popular on the Mac include The Battle for Wesnoth, Nexuiz, OpenArena, X-Moto, GLtron, 0 A.D., various games featuring Tux, and more. Most source ports and game engine recreations also support the Mac. The Mac Source Ports website strives to ensure support for macOS for various game ports.

== Steam ==
On March 8, 2010, Valve stated that they would be porting their entire library of games over to Mac. They decided on native versions of their games, rather than emulations, and that any games purchased over Steam for computers running Windows would be available for free download to computers running Mac OS X, and vice versa. The first game to be released simultaneously for Mac and Windows by Valve was Portal 2 in April 2011.

== Apple Silicon ==
Game Porting Toolkit is Apple's new translation layer released on 6 June 2023. Game Porting Toolkit (GPTK) combines Wine with Apple's own D3DMetal which supports DirectX 11 and 12. This is a less user-friendly method of installing Windows games on Apple Silicon Macs compared to CrossOver or Parallels, however it unlocks the ability to play many DirectX 12 games. A lot more games work using GPTK, however, games that use anti-cheat or aggressive DRMs generally don't work, along with games that require AVX/AVX 2, e.g. The Last of Us Part I.

Games that natively supported x64 Mac OS versions but not Mac OS on ARM, run through the Rosetta 2 translation layer on Apple Silicon Macs. While Rosetta 2 is being removed from Mac OS versions beyond Mac OS 27, Apple have confirmed "we will keep a subset of Rosetta functionality aimed at supporting older unmaintained gaming titles".

== See also ==
- List of Macintosh games
