= Sprocket (disambiguation) =

A sprocket is a profiled wheel with teeth.

Sprocket may also refer to:

== Fictional characters ==
- Sprocket (comics), a Marvel Comics character
- Sprocket, a character in the television series Fraggle Rock
- Sprocket, a Tech character in Skylanders: Giants
- Sprocket, a child villain in Power Rangers Zeo
- Sprocket, an Ostrich villager in Animal Crossing

== Other uses ==
- Sprockets (Saturday Night Live), a television comedy sketch on Saturday Night Live

== See also ==
- Game Sprockets, an API for Mac OS
- Spacely's Space Sprockets, the company George Jetson worked for on The Jetsons
