= Jam session (disambiguation) =

A jam session is a relatively informal musical event, process, or activity where musicians, typically instrumentalists, play improvised solos and vamp on tunes, songs and chord progressions.

Jam session may also refer to:

- Jam Session (1942 film), a short film featuring Duke Ellington
- Jam Session (1944 film), an American film by Charles Barton
- Jam Session (software), a 1986 software program for Macintosh computers for music creation and playback
- Jam Session (1999 film), a Japanese documentary about the making of Kikujiro
- Jam Sessions, a 2007 video game
- Jam Session (album)

== See also ==
- Jamming (dance)
