= Ukrainization =

Efforts to promote the Ukrainian language and culture in Ukraine

Ukrainization or Ukrainisation (Ukrainian: Українізація [ʊkrɐjin⁽ʲ⁾iˈzɑts⁽ʲ⁾ijɐ]) is a policy or practice of increasing the usage and facilitating the development of the Ukrainian language and promoting other elements of Ukrainian culture in various spheres of public life such as education, publishing, government, and religion. The term is also used to describe a process by which non-Ukrainians or Russian-speaking Ukrainians are assimilated to Ukrainian culture and language, either by individual choices or forcibly, as a result of social processes or policies.

== Background ==
From the second half of the 15th century through the 16th century, when present-day Ukraine and Belarus were part of the Grand Duchy of Lithuania, the Renaissance had a major impact on shifting culture, art and literature away from Byzantine Christian theocentrism as expressed in Church Slavonic, towards humanist anthropocentrism, which in writing was increasingly expressed by taking the vernacular language of the common people as the basis of texts. New literary genres developed that were closer to secular topics, such as poetry, polemical literature, and scientific literature. Medieval Church Slavonic works were translated into what became known as Ruthenian, Chancery Slavonic, or Old Ukrainian. The vernacular Ruthenian dilove movlennya ('business speech') of the 16th century would spread to most other domains of everyday communication in the 17th century, with an influx of words, expressions and style from Polish and other European languages. During this period, the usage of Church Slavonic became more restricted to the affairs of religion, the church, hagiography, and some forms of art and science. Ruthenian became a standard language, later splitting into modern Ukrainian and Belarusian.

=== Russian Empire ===
An ethnolinguistic map showing subdivisions of the Russian Empire using data obtained from the 1897 census. The predominantly Ukrainian-speaking area is marked in yellow.

The Russification of Ukraine occurred when Ukrainian lands were a part of the Russian Empire. Laws were introduced to eliminate the use of the Ukrainian language from state institutions, schools, and other spheres of social activity of people, which limited the usefulness of the language and created unfavorable conditions for its development.

== 1917–1923: times after the Russian Revolution ==
Following the Russian Revolution of 1917, the Russian Empire dissolved, and the Ukrainians intensified their struggle for an independent Ukrainian state. In the chaos of World War I and revolutionary changes, a nascent Ukrainian state emerged but, initially, the state's very survival was not ensured. As the Central Rada, the governing body, was trying to assert control over Ukraine amid foreign interventions and internal struggle, only a limited cultural development could take place. However, for the first time in the modern history, Ukraine had a government of its own, but the language of the Central Rada was mixed between several languages such as Polish, Russian, and Ukrainian.

As the Rada was eventually overthrown in a German-backed coup (29 April 1918), the rule of a Hetmanate led by Pavlo Skoropadskyi was established. While the stability of the government was only relative and Skoropadsky himself, as a former officer of the tsarist army, spoke Russian rather than Ukrainian, the Hetmanate managed to start an impressive Ukrainian cultural and education program, printed millions of Ukrainian-language textbooks, and established many Ukrainian schools, two universities, and a Ukrainian Academy of Sciences. The latter established a Committee on Orthography and Terminology, which initiated a scholarly and methodological research program into Ukrainian terminology.

The Hetmanate's rule ended with the German evacuation and was replaced by the Directorate government of Symon Petlura in the wake of Ukraine's defeat against the Polish during the Polish–Ukrainian war. Ukraine was embroiled in war, with factions including Nestor Makhno's anarcho-communist Insurgent Army besides the Polish backed Petlura's government. Following the Treaty of Warsaw (1920),Petliura allied with the Second Polish Republic against the Red Army. It was at various times also the scene of fighting of White and Green armies.

In the West Ukrainian People's Republic, immediately after taking control of towns in Eastern Galicia, Ukrainian authorities ordered the removal of Polish inscriptions in places were Poles lived and their replacement with Ukrainian ones, while also closing Polish schools.

== 1923–1931: early years of Soviet Ukraine ==
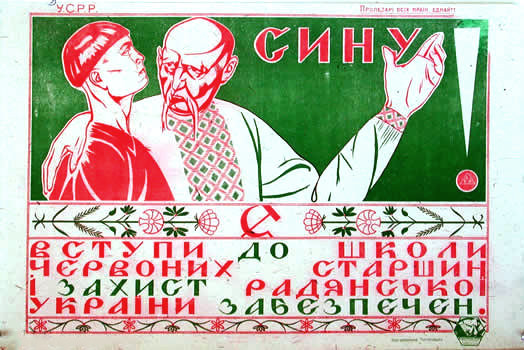
The 1921 Soviet recruitment to the Military Education poster with the Ukrainization theme. The text reads: "Son! Enroll in the School of Red Commanders, and the defence of Soviet Ukraine will be ensured." The poster uses traditional Ukrainian imagery with Ukrainian-language text to reach a wider appeal. The School of Red Commanders in Kharkiv was organized to promote the careers of the Ukrainian national cadre in the army.

At first, the Bolshevik authorities were skeptical about the revival and independence of the non-Russian nations (e.g. Finland, Poland, Lithuania, Ukraine etc.) after the collapse of the Russian Empire. However, after they noticed that the indigenous peoples of the former Russian Empire had a rather negative view of becoming a part of a new Russian state, the Soviet government started an indigenization policy, which had an influence on all non-Russian peoples of the USSR. The purpose of this policy was to expand the communist party network on the non-Russian lands with the involvement of the indigenous population. As a result, this also caused a short period of Ukrainization, until a reversal happened in the early 1930s.

The attempted Ukrainization of the armed forces, Red Army formations serving in Ukraine and abroad, was less successful although moderate progress was attained. The Schools of Red Commanders (Shkola Chervonyh Starshyn) was organized in Kharkiv to promote the careers of the Ukrainian national cadre in the army (see picture). The Ukrainian newspaper of the Ukrainian Military District "Chervona Armiya" was published until the mid-1930s. The efforts were made to introduce and expand Ukrainian terminology and communication in the Ukrainian Red Army units. The policies even reached the army units in which Ukrainians served in other Soviet regions. For instance the Soviet Pacific Fleet included a Ukrainian department overseen by Semyon Rudniev.

As Bolshevik rule took hold in Ukraine, the early Soviet government had its own reasons to encourage the national movements of the former Russian Empire. While trying to ascertain and consolidate its power, the Bolshevik government was by far more concerned about political oppositions connected to the pre-revolutionary order than about the national movements inside the former empire. The reversal of the assimilationist policies of the Russian Empire was potentially done to help to improve the image of the Soviet government and boost its popularity among the common people.

Until the early-1930s, Ukrainian culture enjoyed a widespread revival due to Bolshevik policies known as the policy of Korenizatsiia ("indigenization"). In these years a Ukrainization program was implemented throughout the republic. In such conditions, the Ukrainian national idea initially continued to develop and even spread to a large territory with traditionally mixed population in the east and south that became part of the Ukrainian Soviet republic.

The All-Ukrainian Sovnarkom's decree "On implementation of the Ukrainization of the educational and cultural institutions" (27 July 1923) is considered to be the onset of the Ukrainization program. The (August 1) decree that followed shortly "On implementation of the equal rights of the languages and facilitation of the Ukrainian language" mandated the implementation of Ukrainian language to all levels of state institutions. Initially, the program was met with resistance by some Ukrainian Communists, largely because non-Ukrainians prevailed numerically in the party at the time. The resistance was finally overcome in 1925 through changes in the party leadership under the pressure of Ukrainian representatives in the party. In April 1925 the party Central Committee adopted the resolution on Ukrainization proclaiming its aim as "solidifying the union of the peasantry with the working class" and boosting the overall support of the Soviet system among Ukrainians. A joint resolution aimed at "complete Ukrainization of the Soviet apparatus" as well as the party and trade unions was adopted on 30 April 1925. The Ukrainian Commissariat of Education (Narkomos) was charged with overseeing the implementation of the Ukrainization policies. The two figures, therefore, most identified with the policy are Alexander Shumsky, the Commissar for Education between 1923 and 1927, and Mykola Skrypnyk, who replaced Shumsky in 1927.

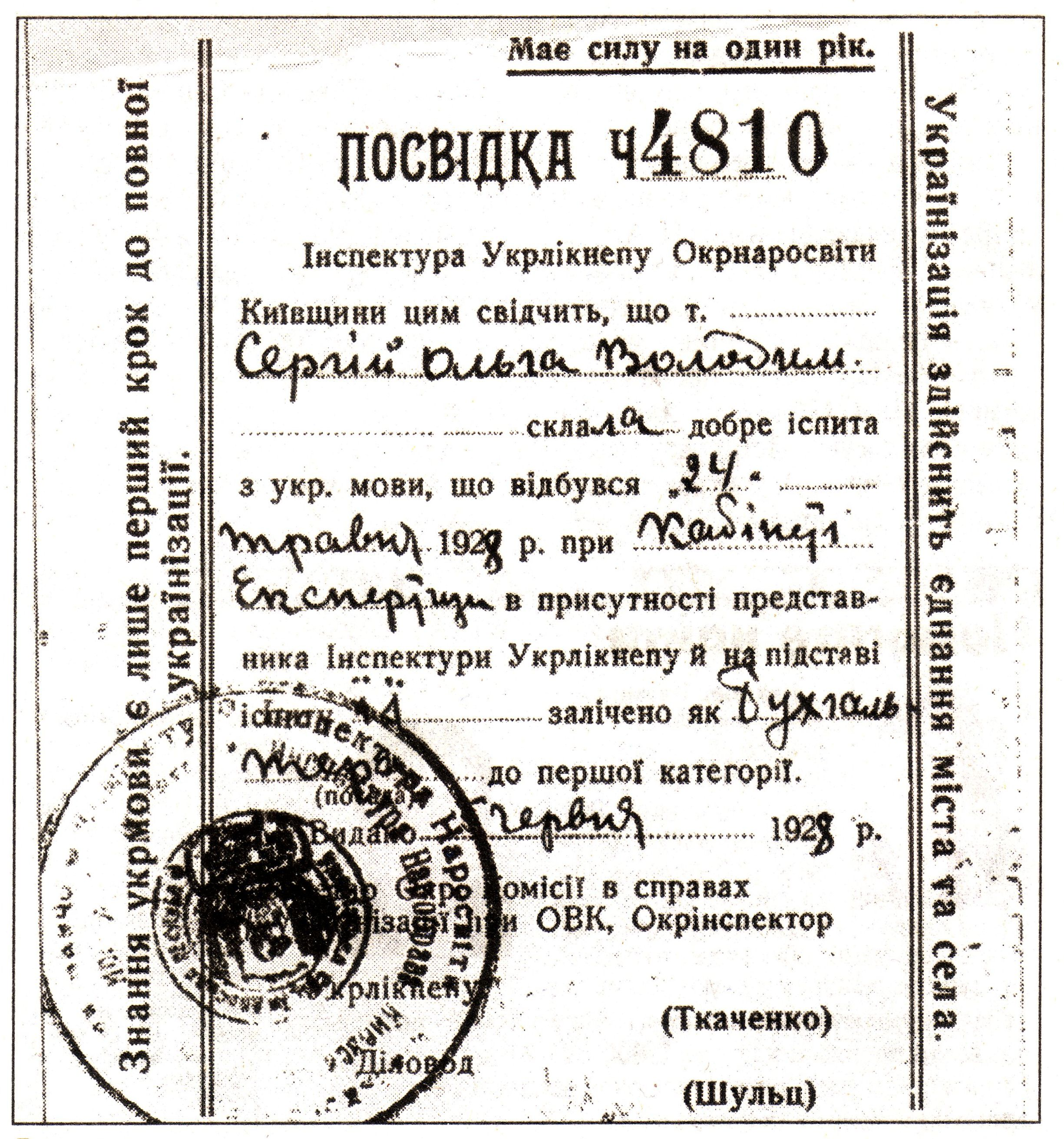
A "Ukrainization certificate" issued in Kyiv Oblast in 1928, confirming that its owner passed a Ukrainian language exam and could be employed by authorities

The Soviet-backed education system dramatically raised the literacy of the Ukrainophone rural population. By 1929 over 97% of high school students in the republic were obtaining their education in Ukrainian and illiteracy dropped from 47% (1926) to 8% in 1934.

Simultaneously, the newly literate ethnic Ukrainians migrated to the cities, which became rapidly largely Ukrainianized — in both population and education. Between 1923 and 1933 the Ukrainian proportion of the population of Kharkiv, at the time the capital of Soviet Ukraine, increased from 38% to 50%. Similar increases occurred in other cities, from 27.1% to 42.1% in Kyiv, from 16% to 48% in Dnipropetrovsk, from 16% to 48% in Odesa, and from 7% to 31% in Luhansk.

Similarly expansive was an increase in Ukrainian language publishing and the overall flourishing of Ukrainian cultural life. As of 1931 out of 88 theatres in Ukraine, 66 were Ukrainian, 12 were Jewish (Yiddish) and 9 were Russian. The number of Ukrainian newspapers, which almost did not exist in 1922, had reached 373 out of 426, while only 3 all-republican large newspapers remained Russian. Of 118 magazines, 89 were Ukrainian. Ukrainization of book-publishing reached 83%.

Ukrainization was thoroughly implemented through the government apparatus, Communist Party of Ukraine membership and, gradually, the party leadership as well, as the recruitment of indigenous cadre was implemented as part of the korenization policies. At the same time, the usage of Ukrainian was continuously encouraged in the workplace and in government affairs. While initially, the party and government apparatus was mostly Russian-speaking, by the end of the 1920s ethnic Ukrainians composed over one half of the membership in the Ukrainian communist party, the number strengthened by accession of Borotbists, a formerly indigenously Ukrainian "independentist" and non-Bolshevik communist party.

| Year | Communist Party members and candidates to membership | Ukrainians | Russians | Others |
|---|---|---|---|---|
| 1922 | 54,818 | 23.3% | 53.6% | 23.3% |
| 1924 | 57,016 | 33.3% | 45.1% | 14.0% |
| 1925 | 101,852 | 36.9% | 43.4% | 19.7% |
| 1927 | 168,087 | 51.9% | 30.0% | 18.1% |
| 1930 | 270,698 | 52.9% | 29.3% | 17.8% |
| 1933 | 468,793 | 60.0% | 23.0% | 17.0% |

In the all-Ukrainian Ispolkom, central executive committee, as well as in the oblast level governments, the proportion of Ukrainians reached 50.3% by 1934 while in raion ispolkoms the number reached 68.8%. On the city and village levels, the representation of Ukrainians in the local government bodies reached 56.1% and 86.1%, respectively. As for other governmental agencies, the Ukrainization policies increased the Ukrainian representation as follows: officers of all-republican People's Commissariat (ministries) - 70-90%, oblast executive brunches - 50%, raion - 64%, Judiciary - 62%, Militsiya (law enforcement) - 58%.

At the same time, despite the ongoing Soviet-wide anti-religious campaign, the Ukrainian national Orthodox Church was created, the Ukrainian Autocephalous Orthodox Church (See History of Christianity in Ukraine). The Bolshevik government initially saw the national churches as a tool in their goal to suppress the Russian Orthodox Church, always viewed with great suspicion by the regime for its being the cornerstone of the defunct Russian Empire and the initially strong opposition it took towards the regime change. Therefore, the government tolerated the new Ukrainian national church for some time and the UAOC gained a wide following among the Ukrainian peasantry.

Ukrainization even reached those regions of southern Russian SFSR, particularly the areas by the Don and Kuban rivers, where mixed population showed strong Ukrainian influences in the local dialect. Ukrainian language teachers, just graduated from expanded institutions of higher education in Soviet Ukraine, were dispatched to these regions to staff newly opened Ukrainian schools or to teach Ukrainian as a second language in Russian schools. A string of local Ukrainian-language publications was started and departments of Ukrainian studies were opened in colleges. Overall, these policies were implemented in thirty-five administrative districts in southern Russia.

== 1930s: revision of Ukrainization policies ==
In the early 1930s, the character of Soviet Ukrainization underwent gradual revision. The efforts of many Soviet Ukrainian politicians to extend korenizatsiia into the RSFSR, beyond the Soviet Ukrainian Republic's borders, had fuelled significant unrest among Russian workers. Stalin and the Soviet government were keenly aware of these anxieties, and during the 1920s they constantly attempted to mediate the competing interests of the Ukrainian Republic and its surrounding Russian territories. From the 1930s onwards, Ukrainization policies were reduced in tempo and implemented silently in order to avoid exacerbating Russian resentments. Sporadic purges of Ukrainian governmental, educational and cultural institutions accompanied this policy shift, and tens of thousands of Ukrainians were arrested or excluded from the party in the national terror of 1933.

In 1933, disturbed by security threats from Poland and Ukrainian peasant resistance to collectivization, Stalin and the party began to fear that poor implementation of Ukrainization had created a dangerous anti-Soviet trend of Ukrainian "bourgeois nationalism". In the regions of southern Russian SFSR, Ukrainization was effectively outlawed. Specifically, the 14 December 1932 decree "On Grain Collection in Ukraine, North Caucasus and the Western Oblasts" by the VKP(b) Central Committee and USSR Sovnarkom stated that Ukrainization in certain areas was carried out formally, in a "non-Bolshevik" way, which provided the "bourgeois-nationalist elements" with a legal cover for organizing their anti-Soviet resistance. The decree ordered that these areas halt their Ukrainization policies and switch to Russian in newspapers, magazines and official paperwork. In alignment with the new Soviet border policies, the decree also ordered a massive population transfer. All "disloyal" peasants (a total of 9187) from a major Cossack settlement, stanitsa Poltavskaya were deported to Northern Russia, to be replaced by demobilised Red Army soldiers. Two more Cossack towns were deported in the following months, pushing the total number of deportees to over 60,000. There is no evidence that this was motivated by a desire to Russify the region: although most of these soldiers were Russian, Ukrainian and Belorussian soldiers also made up the new population. Yet this forced end to Ukrainization in the RSFSR led to a massive decline of self-reported RSFSR Ukrainians and Belorussians in the 1937 Soviet Census, compared to the 1926 First All-Union Census of the Soviet Union. However it did not bring the same changes to the Ukrainian territory, and the number of Ukrainians within the Ukrainian Soviet Republic remained steady between the 1926 and 1937 censuses.

The 1932 decree unintentionally created a halt to Ukrainization across the Soviet Union, as government officials feared reprisals for korenizatsiia policies. Nevertheless, Ukrainization restarted shortly thereafter — only with much less fanfare and publicization than before. In March 1934, Stalin loyalist Stanisław Kosior ordered a review of Ukrainianization within the Soviet government. Following this investigation, the subsequent years saw several decrees from the Ukrainian Politburo ordering the promotion of the Ukrainian language in government and party offices, including the replacement of ethnic Russian officials with ethnic Ukrainians. In 1935–36, 83% of all school children in the Ukrainian SSR were taught in Ukrainian even though Ukrainians made up about 80% of the population. Of 1830 newspapers in 1936, 1402 were in Ukrainian, as were 177 magazines and 69,104 books. Another drop in Ukrainianization would accompany the NKVD's national operations in 1937–1938, but again, the policy rebounded following the end of the Great Purges, despite an emerging consensus of a dual Russian-Ukrainian culture. By 1939, Ukrainian-language newspapers represented 70% of the national circulation, and in that year's census total share of Ukrainians, and other nationalities in their respective republics, had risen steadily in university, white-collar and governmental positions as a result of continued korenizatsiia. Silent Ukrainization characterised the rest of the Stalin era.

== Ukrainization in western Ukraine ==
During World War II Operation Zamość took place, which was an ethnic cleansing carried out by Nazis, with the help of their collaborators (including the Ukrainian Auxiliary Police), between November 1942 and March 1943 in the Zamość region of occupied Poland. Ukraineraktion was a connected operation that occurred from January to March 1943. It involved the forced resettlement of ethnic Ukrainians (often involuntarily) into villages from which Poles had previously been expelled as a "protective belt" separating Poles from German colonizers. In addition to creating a zone intended to protect the Nazi German population from retaliatory actions by Polish partisans (as Operation Zamość was seen as a great tragedy and a war crime by the Polish population) the operation also aimed to antagonize Poles with Ukrainians. It indeed sparked hate between these two groups in the area, as local Poles began to view Ukrainians as colonizers and as collaborators with the Nazis. During the aftermath of World War II, the process of Ukrainization in the Ukrainian SSR was preceded by the expulsion of some ethnic minorities and appropriation of their cultural heritage. The term Ukrainization is also used in the context of these acts.

== 1950s to mid-1980 ==
In the following 40 years, Ukrainians had mixed views from the Soviet Government. The mid-1960s were characterized by moderate Ukrainization efforts in governmental affairs as well as the resurgence of the usage of Ukrainian in education, publishing and culture.

== Independent Ukraine ==
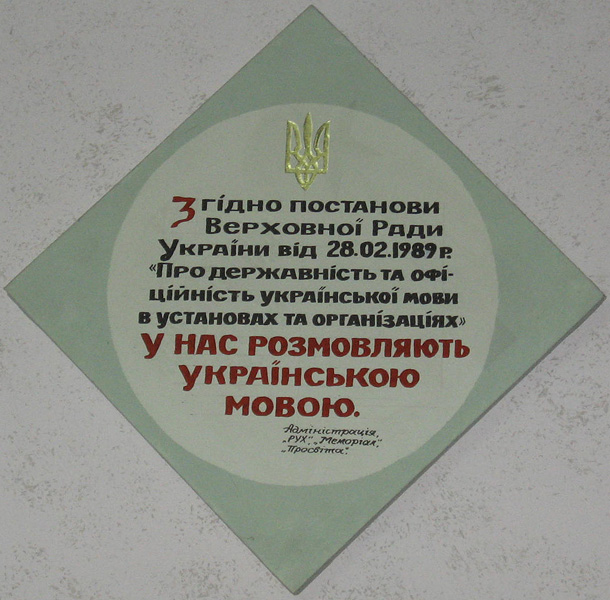
Notice in a Lviv hospital (dated mid-1990s), paraphrasing Article 2 of the 1989 Language Law: "As 'the state language is the Ukrainian language [in] institutions and organisations', we speak Ukrainian here."

On 28 October 1989, the Supreme Soviet of Ukraine changed the Constitution and adopted the Law "On Languages in the Ukrainian SSR". The Ukrainian language was declared the only official language, while the other languages spoken in Ukraine were guaranteed constitutional protection. The government was obliged to create the conditions required for the development and use of Ukrainian language as well as languages of other ethnic groups, including Russian. Usage of other languages, along with Ukrainian, was allowed in local institutions located in places of residence of the majority of citizens of the corresponding ethnicities. Citizens were guaranteed the right to use their native or any other languages and were entitled to address various institutions and organizations in Ukrainian, in Russian, or in another language of their work, or in a language acceptable to the parties.

After the Declaration of Independence of Ukraine in 1991 during the dissolution of the Soviet Union, the 1989 language law, with some minor amendments, remained in force in the independent Ukrainian state. Adopted in 1996, the new Constitution of Ukraine confirmed the official state status of the Ukrainian language, and guaranteed the free development, use, and protection of Russian and other languages of national minorities of Ukraine.

Ever since 1989, the Ukrainian government followed a policy of Ukrainization, to increase the use of Ukrainian while discouraging Russian, which by 2006 had been gradually phased out from the country's education system, government, and national TV, radio programs, and films. Until 2017, the "On Education" law granted Ukrainian families the right to choose their native language for schools and studies. It was revised to make the Ukrainian language the primary language used by children in all schools, except for those belonging to ethnic minorities.

Language issues continued to be used by politicians to generate controversy. On 20 May 2008, Donetsk City Council passed a resolution limiting the expansion of Ukrainian-language education in the city. The following day the city prosecutor declared the decision illegal and the mayor suspended it, and the council reversed itself two days later.

According to a March 2010 survey, forced Ukrainization and Russian language suppression were among the least troubling problems for Ukrainian citizens, concerning only 4.8% of population.

=== Educational system ===
==== Education from 1991 to 2017 ====
Percentage of secondary school students in Ukraine by the primary language of instruction
| Year | Ukrainian | Russian |
|---|---|---|
| 1991 | 45% | 54% |
| 1996 | 60% | 39.2% |
| 1997 | 62.7% | 36.5% |
| 1998 | 65% | 34.4% |
| 1999 | 67.5% | 31.8% |
| 2000 | 70.3% | 28.9% |
| 2001 | 72.5% | 26.6% |
| 2002 | 73.8% | 25.3% |
| 2003–2004 | 75.1% | 23.9% |

The government of independent Ukraine implemented policies to broaden the use of Ukrainian and mandated a progressively increased role for Ukrainian in the media and commerce. The most significant was the government's concerted effort to implement Ukrainian, as the only official state language in the country, into the state educational system. Despite the Constitution, the Law on Education (grants Ukrainian families (parents and their children) a right to choose their native language for schools and studies) as well as the Law of Languages (a guarantee for the protection of all languages in Ukraine) the education system gradually reshaped from a system that was only partly Ukrainian to the one that is overwhelmingly so. The Russian language is still studied as a required course in all secondary schools, including those with Ukrainian as the primary language of instructions.

The number of secondary school students who received their primary education in Ukrainian grew from 47.9% in 1990–1991 (the last school year before Ukrainian independence) to 67.4% in 1999 and to 75.1% by 2003–2004 (see table). Ukrainization has achieved even greater gains in higher education institutions where as of 1990–1991 only 7% of students were being taught primarily in Ukrainian. By 2003–2004 the percentage of college and technicum students studying in Ukrainian reached 87.7% and for the students of the university-level institutions this number reached 80.1% (see table).

The extent of educational institutions' Ukrainization varies in the different regions of Ukraine. In the 16 western oblasts (provinces) of Ukraine there are 26 Russian language schools out of 12,907 and in Kyiv six out of 452 schools use Russian as their primary language of instruction, (according to a 2006 survey, Ukrainian is used at home by 23% of Kyivans, as 52% use Russian and 24% switch between both). In the Donets Basin region the percentage of students receiving education in Russian roughly corresponds to the percentage of population who considers Russian as their native language and in Crimea the overwhelming majority of secondary schools students are taught in Russian. The distribution is similar in the institutes of the higher education while the latter are somewhat more Ukrainianized.

The increase of the share of secondary school students obtaining education in Ukrainian (from 47.9% to 67%) over the first decade of the Ukrainian independence roughly corresponded to the share of native Ukrainian speakers - 67.5%. Schools continue to be transferred to the Ukrainian language up to this day. At the end of the 1990s, about 50% of professional school students, 62% of college students and 67% of university students (cf. 7% in 1991) studied in Ukrainian and in the following five years the number increased even further (see table).

Percentage students in higher education by the primary language of instruction
| | Colleges and technicums (Note: Institutions of higher education with accreditation below the university level.) | | University-level institutions (Note: These institutions of higher education had the highest accreditation levels.) | |
| Year | Ukrainian | Russian | Ukrainian | Russian |
|---|---|---|---|---|
| 2000–2001 | 78% | 22% | 73.4% | 26.5% |
| 2001–2002 | 80% | 20% | 76.3% | 23.6% |
| 2002–2003 | 81.8% | 18.2% | 77.8% | 22.1% |
| 2003–2004 | 83.4% | 16.6% | 78.7% | 21.2% |
| 2004–2005 | 87.7% | 12.3% | 80.1% | 19.9% |

In some cases, the changing of the language of instruction in institutions, led to the charges of assimilation, raised mostly by the Russian-speaking population. Despite this, the transition was gradual and lacked many controversies that surrounded the de-Russification in several of the other former Soviet Republics, its perception within Ukraine remained mixed.

==== 2017 law "On Education" ====
On 25 September 2017, a new law on education was signed by the President (draft approved by the Verkhovna Rada (Ukraine's national parliament) on 5 September 2017) which said that the Ukrainian language is the language of education at all levels except for subjects that are allowed to be taught in two or more languages, namely English or one of the other official languages of the European Union.

The law was condemned by PACE that called it "a major impediment to the teaching of national minorities". The law also faced criticism from officials in Hungary, Romania and Russia. (Hungarian and Romanian are official languages of the European Union, Russian is not.) Ukrainian officials stressed that the new law complies fully with European norms on minority rights. The law does state that "Persons belonging to indigenous peoples of Ukraine are guaranteed the right to study in public facilities of preschool and primary education in the language of instruction of the respective indigenous people, along with the state language of instruction" in separate classes or groups. PACE describes this as a significant curtailing of the rights of indigenous peoples carried out without consultations with their representatives. On 27 June 2018 Ukrainian foreign minister Pavlo Klimkin stated that following the recommendation of the Venice Commission the language provision of the (September 2017) law on education will not apply to private schools and that every public school for national minorities "will have broad powers to independently determine which classes will be taught in Ukrainian or their native language."

In January 2020 the law was changed and made it legal to teach "one or more disciplines" in "two or more languages – in the official state language, in English, in another official languages of the European Union". All not state funded schools were made free to choose their own language of instruction.

According to the 2020 law until the fifth year of education all lessons can be completely thought in the minority language without mandatory teaching of subjects in Ukrainian. In the fifth year not less than 20% of the lessons must be taught in Ukrainian. Then every year the volume of teaching in the state language (Ukrainian) should increase, reaching 40% in the ninth grade. In the twelfth and final year at least 60% of education should be taught in Ukrainian.

The 2017 language education law stipulated a 3-year transitional period to come in full effect. In February 2018, this period was extended until 2023. In June 2023 this period was again extended to September 2024.

Since the introduction of the 2017 language law Hungary–Ukraine relations had greatly deteriorated over the issue of the Hungarian minority in Ukraine. Hungary under the Orbán government was since 2017, blocking Ukraine's attempt to integrate within the EU and NATO to help the Hungarian minority in Ukraine.

=== 2023 changes to national minorities' language rights ===
On 8 December 2022, the Ukrainian parliament passed a bill that amend some laws on the rights of national minorities in light of the Council of Europe’s expert assessment and in order to meet one of the European Commission’s criteria for the opening of EU membership negotiations. These changes gave the right to privately-owned institutions of higher education to have the right to freely choose the language of study if it is an official language of the European Union, while ensuring that persons studying at such institutions study the state language Ukrainian as a separate academic discipline; it guaranteed that national minorities whose language is an official languages of the European Union the right to use the language of the corresponding national minority in the educational process along with the state language and it ensured that pupils who had begun their general secondary education before 1 September 2018 in the language of the corresponding national minority, will have the right to continue to receive such education until the completion of their full secondary education in accordance with the rules that applied before the Law of Ukraine "On protecting the functioning of the Ukrainian language as the state language" came into force on 16 July 2019.

=== Mass media ===
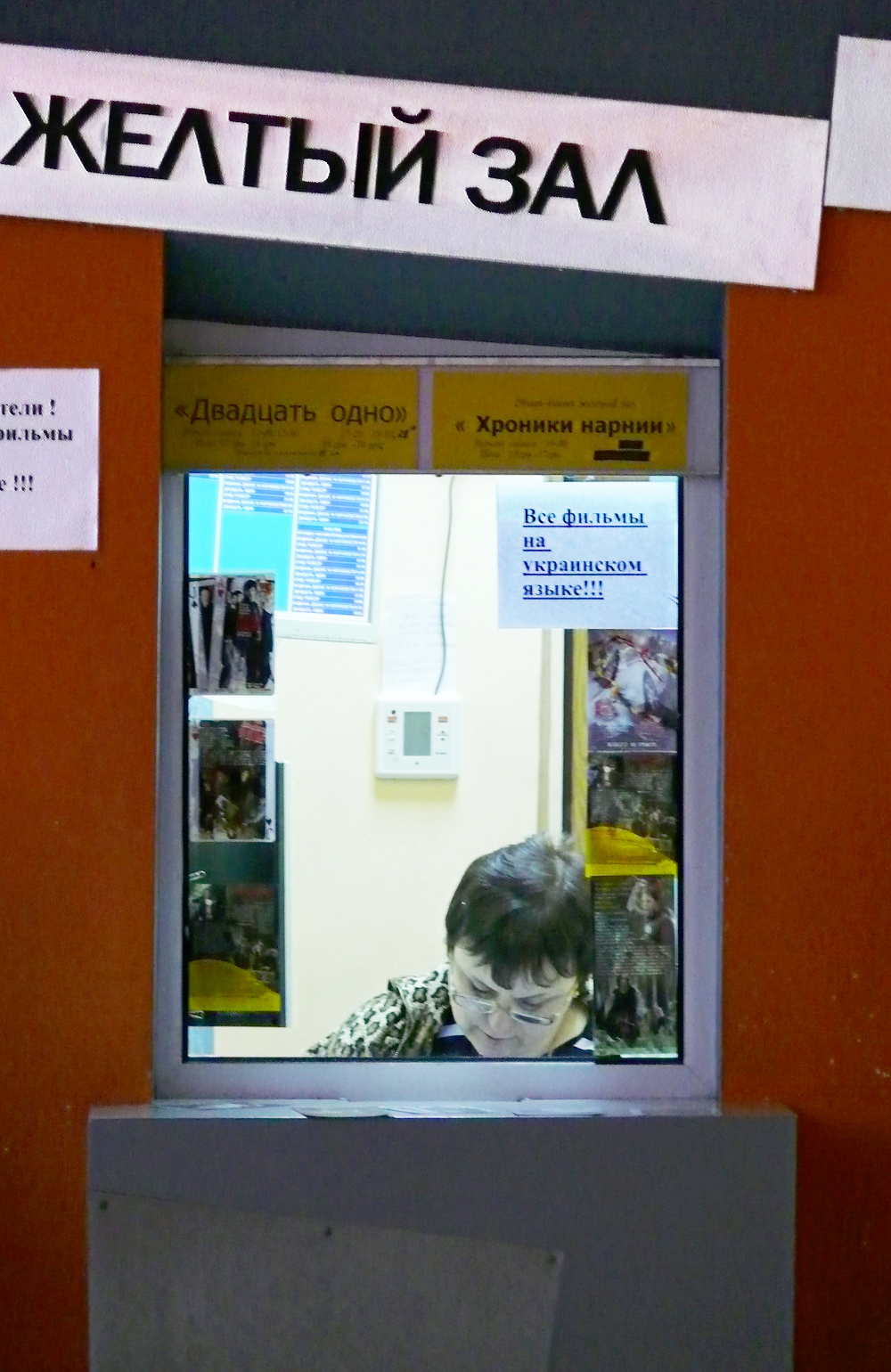
A cinema ticket booth in Kharkiv with a Russian-language information sign informing visitors, that all films are being screened in Ukrainian, 2008

Until 2006, only about 1% of all films on television or in cinemas in Ukraine were subtitled in Ukrainian, without dubbing. Since 2004, the Ukrainian government has enacted restrictions on Russian-language television and radio programs. Russian-language programs are required to include a Ukrainian translation or subtitles, and local radio and television stations have the right to broadcast in Russian only if they can prove they have a Russian audience. There was some opposition against this ban. Today the ban is in full effect, but Russian movies are mostly subtitled in cinemas and on Ukrainian television. Non-Russian and non-Ukrainian movies which used to be dubbed in Russian may now only be dubbed, post-synchronized or subtitled in Ukrainian. Ukrainian authorities defended the ban, stating that it aimed to develop a home-grown Ukrainian distribution industry and to give Ukrainian distributors "muscle" in negotiating their own deals to buy foreign films. Russian distributors control around 90% of foreign films screened in Ukraine and tend to supply Russian-language dubbed or subtitled copies that are part of wider packages distributed throughout Russia and the former Soviet territories. Andriy Khalpakhchi, director the Ukrainian Cinema Foundation, claims "Some European sellers at Berlin's film market are reporting that Russian buyers are already threatening not to buy films if they sell directly to Ukraine without using Russian distribution channels." Despite earlier fears that there would be problems due to the introduction of compulsory Ukrainian dubbing of films (since 2006), the number of visitors to Ukrainian cinemas soared by 40% in Q1 of the year 2009 compared to the same period of the previous year.

Several Russian TV channels have not been allowed to broadcast in Ukraine since 1 November 2008, according to Ukraine's National Council on Television and Radio Broadcasting mainly because of the advertising aired by the channels. The Ukrainian distributors of television channels were ordered to bring the broadcasts in line with Ukrainian laws. Channel One and Ren TV have since been granted temporary permission to broadcast, while a separate version of RTR Planeta was started specially for Ukrainian TV viewers in October 2009.

On 13 May 2010, Russian Foreign Minister Sergei Lavrov claimed that in Ukraine "the discriminatory, politically-motivated, ideology-tinged and anti-Russian decisions that were being made when Yuschenko was President have been lifted".

On 23 May 2017, Ukrainian parliament approved the law proposed in November 2016 that demands national, regional, satellite, and multi-channel TV and radio networks to broadcast at least 75% of their content (summarized on weekly basis separately in time intervals 7 am – 6 pm and 6 pm – 10 pm) in Ukrainian starting from 13 October 2017. 50% is required from local networks, and 75% of news programs is required in Ukrainian for all networks. Films and broadcasts which are not products of these networks and produced after 1991 must be broadcast exclusively in Ukrainian. Reasonable exceptions are provided for inclusion of non-Ukrainian language into otherwise Ukrainian-language broadcasts. The National Security and Defense Council of Ukraine may permit exceptions to this law for broadcasts which serve elimination of threats to national security. At the time the only two national Ukrainian TV channels who did not already broadcast 75% of their content in Ukrainian were "Inter" and "Ukraine". Also because of this May 2017 approved law, since 8 November 2018 Ukrainian radio stations must broadcast no less than 35% of songs in Ukrainian or if it plays 60% of its songs in the official languages of the European Union then 25%.

=== Politics ===
In two presidential elections, in 1994 and 2004, the role of languages in Ukraine was an important election issue. In 1994 the main opposition candidate, Leonid Kuchma, in an attempt to widen his political appeal, expressed his support for the idea of Russian becoming the second state language, as well as promising to improve his knowledge of the Ukrainian language. In addition to the stagnating economy, the language issue likely contributed to Kuchma's victory in the election; but while his knowledge of Ukrainian noticeably improved, Kuchma did not follow through on his pledge to make Russian a state language during the 10 years of his presidency.

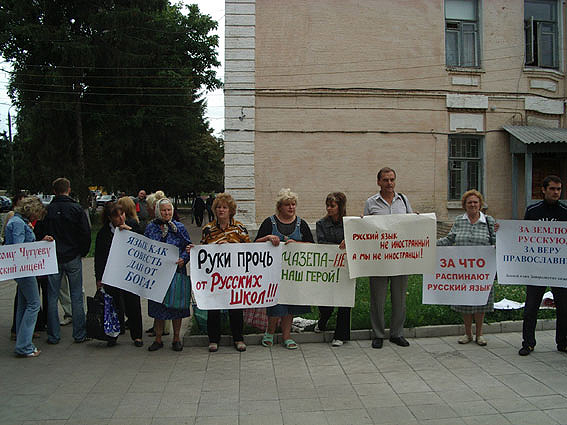
Pro-Russian public association activists protest against Ukrainization of a Russian public school in Chuhuiv (Kharkiv Oblast, 2005). Banners are written in Russian language.

In 2004 an election promise by Viktor Yanukovych (leader of the Party of Regions) to adopt Russian as the second official language might also have increased the turnout of his base, but it was rebutted during the campaign by his opponent (Viktor Yushchenko), who pointed out that Yanukovych could have already taken steps towards this change while he was a Prime Minister of Ukraine if this had really been his priority. During his campaign Yushchenko emphasized that his being painted as a proponent of the closure of Russian schools frequently made by his opponents is entirely baseless and stated his view that the issue of school language, as well as the churches, should be left to local communities. Nevertheless, during Yuchshenko's presidency the transfer of educational institutions from Russian to Ukrainian continued.

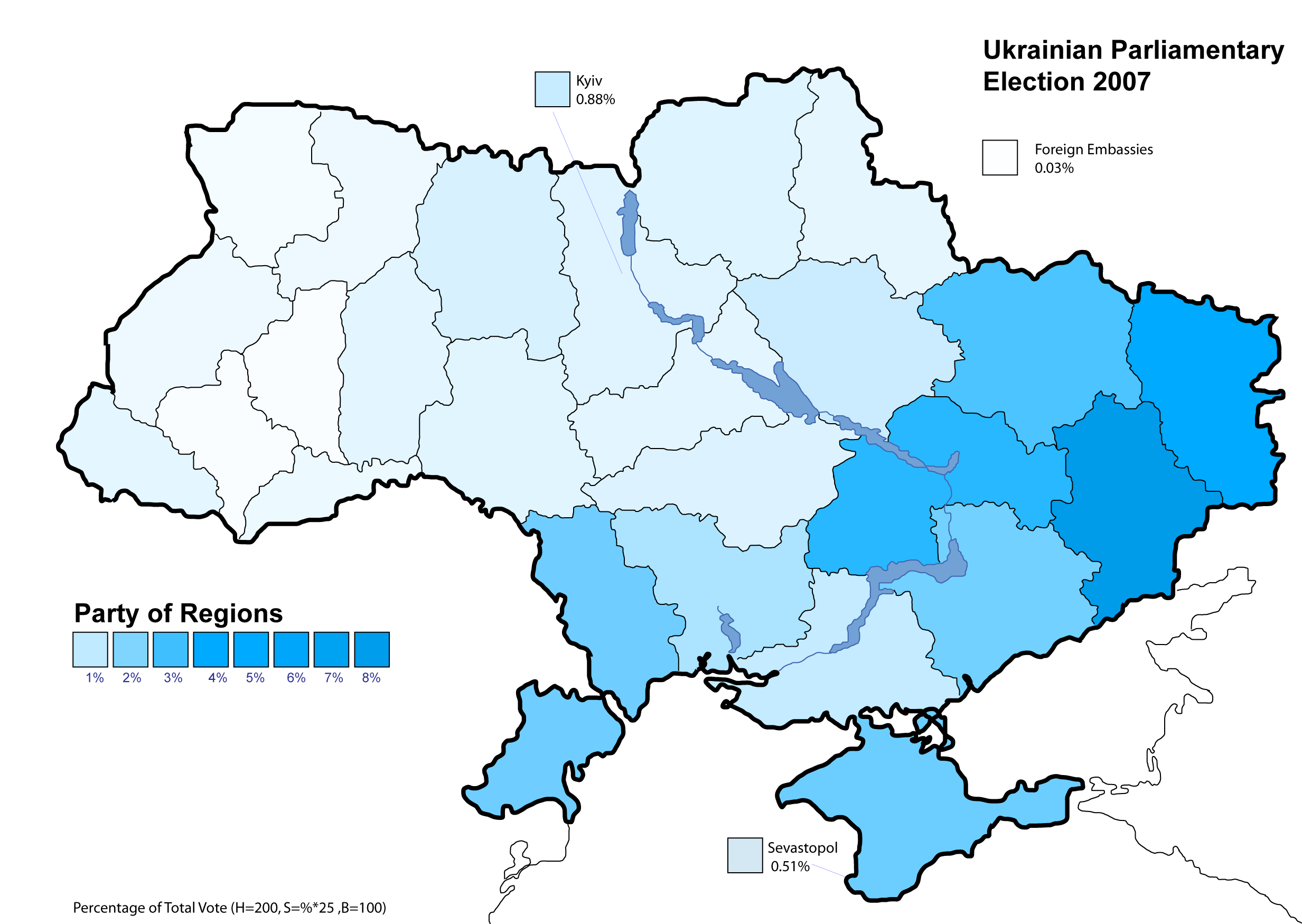
Map showing the results of the Party of Regions at the 2007 election shows that its voters live mainly in regions where the Russian language is dominant.

In the 2006 parliamentary election the status of the Russian language in Ukraine was brought up again by the opposition parties. The leading opposition party, Party of Regions, promised to introduce two official languages, Russian and Ukrainian, on the national and regional levels. On the national level such changes require modifying Article 10 of the Constitution of Ukraine, which the party hopes to achieve. Before the election in Kharkiv, and following the election in the other south-eastern regions such as Donetsk, Dnipropetrovsk, Luhansk, Mykolaiv, and the Crimea, the newly elected local councils, won by the Party of Regions (and minor supporting parties), declared Russian as a regional language, citing the European Charter for Regional or Minority Languages, ratified by Ukraine in 2003. In Dnipropetrovsk, the court has found the order of the Dnipropetrovsk City Council on introducing Russian as a regional language unlawful, but the legal battle on the local status of the Russian language remains to be resolved.

In the wake of the 2006 Parliamentary crisis in Ukraine that fractured the governing coalition and returned Yanukovych to the Prime Ministership, the "Universal of National Unity" signed by President Yushchenko as well as the leaders of several of the most influential political parties declared that Ukrainian would remain the official state language in Ukraine. However, within a week after signing the Universal, Yanukovych, then approved as Prime Minister of Ukraine, stated at a press conference in Sochi (Russia) that the implementation of Russian as a second state language remains the goal of his party even though he does not see it achieved in the immediate future because such a change, which would require amending the Constitution, would not collect the required majority (two-thirds) in the Parliament of Ukraine given the current political situation.

During the electoral campaign for the 2010 Ukrainian presidential election Yanukovych at first stated that if he were elected President, he would do everything in order to make Russian the second state language in Ukraine, but in an interview with Kommersant later during the campaign he stated that the status of Russian in Ukraine "is too politicized" and said that if elected president in 2010 he would "have a real opportunity to adopt a law on languages, which implements the requirements of the European Charter of regional languages". He implied this law would need 226 votes in the Ukrainian parliament (50% of the votes instead of the 75% of the votes needed to change the constitution of Ukraine). After his early 2010 election as President Yanukovych stated (on 9 March 2010) "Ukraine will continue to promote the Ukrainian language as its only state language".

=== Law ===
According to the laws on civil and administrative procedure enacted in Ukraine in 2005, all legal and court proceedings in Ukraine are to be conducted in Ukrainian. This does not restrict, however, the usage of other languages, as the law guarantees interpretation services for any language desired by a citizen, defendant or witness.

=== Historical and political calendar ===
President Petro Poroshenko claimed to be carrying out the "Ukrainianization of the historical and political calendar - the replacement of the Soviet-Russian imposed upon us." This has led to the moving of military holidays to new dates and the creation of the Defenders of Ukraine Day.

The 2017 abolition of May 2 as public holiday (as it was in the Soviet era) and instead (since 2017) making Western Christianity's Christmas, celebrated 25 December, a new Ukrainian public holiday was also described as moving away from "Moscow's calendar and Russian imperial standards" (by Oleksandr Turchynov, the Secretary of the National Security and Defense Council of Ukraine in 2017). (May 1's International Workers' Day remained a Ukrainian public holiday, although it was renamed (also in 2017) from "Day of International Solidarity of Workers" to "Labor Day".)

=== Video game localisation into Ukrainian ===
Profitability
Monetisation, in the sense in which the term is used in the gaming industry, is not possible in the context of localisation. As a rule, localisation for a game is planned, commissioned and funded by the developer (or publisher). They do this with a single aim—to distribute their game as widely as possible and, as a result, to earn more. Accordingly, the developer selects the languages for localisation that are most attractive in terms of distribution and revenue.

As the video gaming industry is thoroughly interconnected around the globe, localisation of video games into Ukrainian (Ukrainian: локалізація відеоігор українською) has not been an area where the government of Ukraine has been particularly involved with language policy, until 2019. Instead, it has been a complicated dynamic between video game developers, publishers, marketeers, retailers, consumers (gamers), reviewers, commentators and researchers. Localisation of video games into Ukrainian began almost as soon as video games appeared in Ukraine in the 1990s, but for a long time it remained a purely amateur effort. Translations were usually done from Russian, the language in which the games were officially distributed in the Commonwealth of Independent States (CIS). It was only in the 2010s that some enthusiasts managed to secure deals with video game publishers. As a result, the following games received an official Ukrainian localisation: Valve, such as Counter-Strike: Global Offensive, Dota 2, Dota Underlords, Half-Life: Alyx, as well as Kingdom Come: Deliverance, Metro 2033, The Sinking City and so on. However, publishers have generally not been keen on including Ukrainian in their games, believing that it does not have a significant enough impact on sales figures, as the market for Ukrainian-language games was presumably too niche. Only a few games, such as Cradle, were localised into Ukrainian upon their initial release.

Some studios, having initially released games in Ukraine in Russian, subsequently produced their own Ukrainian localisations. This led to translations of games in the S.T.A.L.K.E.R. series, Cossacks: European Wars, and Metro 2033. As of 2021, over a thousand video game products (games and their expansions) had been officially localised into Ukrainian. However, most of them are small indie games, which are localised by enthusiasts in collaboration with publishers. Most of them are available on the Steam platform. A professional translator translates around 50,000 words of video game text per month. Most games for PC are available in Ukrainian. For consoles, there are a few games on the PlayStation 4: Metro 2033, The Sinking City and several indie games. The reason is that only Sony, the manufacturer of the PlayStation 4, officially sells these consoles in Ukraine.

The main reasons for the lack of Ukrainian localisation in video games are the perception of Ukraine as a former member of the Soviet Union, where everyone is expected to understand Russian; and the high cost of additional localisation into Ukrainian. An additional reason is the relatively high rate of video game piracy in Ukraine, leading to lost income for game developers potentially interested in localising their product for the Ukrainian market. Article 27, paragraph 2 of the Law of Ukraine "On protecting the functioning of the Ukrainian language as the state language" requires that "a computer programme distributed within Ukraine must be provided with a user interface in the state language, which, in terms of scope and content, must contain no less information than the foreign-language versions of such an interface." This provision came into force on 19 July 2022. (Note: Chapter XI. Final and transitional provisions: "parts two and six of Article 27 of this Law, which shall enter into force three years after the date of entry into force of this Law". Given that the Law entered into force on 19 July 2019, this provision entered into force on 19 July 2022.)

Since the start of the full-scale Russian invasion of Ukraine in February 2022, the number of games with Ukrainian localisation has increased significantly. Large companies began to understand that Ukrainians wished to play in their native language rather than be lumped together with the Russians (even if they understood the Russian language fairly well), and were willing to buy and support games which were localised to Ukrainian. Even as some Ukrainians were still comfortable playing games in Russian, demand for Ukrainian has grown strongly since 2022, leading to major video game projects being officially localised to Ukrainian upon release. In the years 2022–2024, these included Cyberpunk 2077 and the expansion Phantom Liberty, Baldur's Gate III, Alan Wake 2, and Subnautica: Below Zero.

Ukrainian gamers themselves also began using Steam's interface in Ukrainian a lot more frequently. Before February 2022, 0.16% of all Steam players used the Ukrainian interface; by March 2024, this had grown strongly to 0.5%. For comparison, the Polish interface was used by almost 2% of all players, while both countries have about the same population size. At the same time, 3% of all games on Steam had Ukrainian localisation, while 6% of Steam games was available in Polish. By March 2026, Ukrainian had grown to 0.74%, taking the 15th place of most popular Steam interface language, although these percentages fluctuate somewhat from month to month.

== See also ==
- Chronology of Ukrainian language suppression
- Derussianization
  - Demolition of monuments to Alexander Pushkin in Ukraine
  - Demolition of monuments to Vladimir Lenin in Ukraine
  - Russification and Derussification in Ukraine
- Decommunization
  - Decommunization in Russia
  - Decommunization in Ukraine
    - List of communist monuments in Ukraine
    - List of Ukrainian toponyms that were changed as part of decommunization in 2016
    - Ukrainian decommunization laws
- Language policy in Ukraine
  - Reversal of Ukrainization policies in Soviet Ukraine
- Lustration in Ukraine
- People's Friendship Arch, colloquial name "Yarmo" (Yoke)
- Russians in Ukraine
  - Russian language in Ukraine
- Ukrainian nationalism
  - Law of Ukraine "On supporting the functioning of the Ukrainian language as the State language"
  - Ukrainian independence awakening
  - Ukrainophilia
- Volhynian Genocide

=== Related topics ===
- 2014 pro-Russian unrest in Ukraine
- Accession of Ukraine to the European Union
- Annexation of Crimea by the Russian Federation
- Anti-war protests in Russia (2022–present)
- Geopolitics of Russia
  - All-Russian nation
  - Eurasianism
  - Moscow, third Rome
  - Opposition to the Euromaidan
  - Russian separatist forces in Ukraine
  - Russian world
  - Ruscism
- International recognition of the Donetsk People's Republic and the Luhansk People's Republic
- Krasovsky case
- Media portrayal of the Russo-Ukrainian War
- Russian imperialism
- Russian irredentism
- Russian nationalism
- Ukraine–NATO relations
- War crimes in the Russian invasion of Ukraine
  - Allegations of genocide of Ukrainians in the Russo-Ukrainian War
  - Bucha massacre
  - Child abductions in the Russo-Ukrainian War

== Bibliography ==
- Peredriyenko, V. A. (2001). "Староукраїнська проста мова ХУІ – ХУІІІ ст. в контексті формування національної літературної мови" [The 17th–18th-century Old Ukrainian vernacular in context of national literary language formation]. Актуальні проблеми української лінгвістики: теорія і практика (in Ukrainian) (4). Taras Shevchenko National University of Kyiv: 16–23. ISSN 2311-2697.
- Snyder, Timothy D. (2003). The Reconstruction of Nations: Poland, Ukraine, Lithuania, Belarus, 1569–1999. Yale University Press. p. 384. ISBN 978-0-300-10586-5.
- Martin, Terry D. (2001). The Affirmative Action Empire. Nations and Nationalism in the Soviet Union, 1923–1939. Ithaca and London: Cornell University Press. ISBN 0-8014-8677-7.
