= TaskMaker =

1989 video game

- Developer: Storm Impact
- Publishers: XOR Corporation (1989); Storm Impact (1993)
- Designers: David Cook, Tom Zehner
- Platform: Classic Mac OS
- Release: 1989, 1993
- Genre: Role-playing video game
- Mode: Single-player

TaskMaker is a role-playing video game for the Macintosh. Originally published in 1989 by XOR Corporation, it was upgraded and re-released as shareware in 1993 by Storm Impact, featuring color graphics and compatibility with newer versions of the classic Mac OS. The player controls a protagonist who is under the mentorship of the eponymous TaskMaker, a ruler who assigns ten different quests. Completing these quests involves solving various gameplay puzzles, along with battling monsters, and the final task involves a battle against the TaskMaker himself. TaskMaker received mixed reception regarding its overall storyline and gameplay.

Storm Impact released a sequel, The Tomb of the Taskmaker, in 1997. In this game, the protagonist has succeeded the TaskMaker in becoming ruler of the land, and is once again assigned ten different quests to retrieve magical artifacts before facing off in a final battle. Although Storm Impact closed not long after the latter game's release, both have remained in distribution through the website of David Cook, one of the game's programmers.

== Plot ==
The player controls a young hero who has arrived to be trained and eventually become the leader of the game's main setting, Outer Terra. The TaskMaker, leader of the game's world, serves as the player's mentor. The TaskMaker assigns the player ten tasks, the first nine of which are quests to obtain an item from a different dungeon or town. In doing so, the player encounters game elements such as illusionary walls, teleports, traps, and switches, as well as monsters and other non-playable characters with whom the player can interact. After retrieving an item, the player returns it to the TaskMaker, who then assigns the next task.

In the game's next-to-last task, the TaskMaker asks the player to kill a prisoner on his island. Returning to the TaskMaker after killing the prisoner reveals the TaskMaker to be evil, and the game ends; not killing the prisoner results in a battle with the TaskMaker as the final task, and leads to the game's true ending. Once the TaskMaker is killed, the player is declared "master" of the land, and a special menu is unlocked in the game, allowing for the player to edit all the dungeons and villages.

== Gameplay ==
A screenshot from the Storm Impact version.

The player's overall status is measured by seven status bars. All stats save for food will replenish through time and resting:

- Food: Food is the character's appetite and requires food in order to fill. Although food does not affect combat, it allows the character to rest and heal. When depleted, the character will be unable to rest and continually lose health until he either receives more food or he dies.
- Health: Health illustrates the character's wellbeing and how close to death they become. Health is lost by falling into traps and getting hit by enemies. Once it falls to or below zero, the player is transported to Hell. Hell is a maze lined with flaming walls containing 4 exits in each corner with a demon guard. Only one exit will be open and thus one demon to battle.
- Spirit: Spirit is required for both battle, special commands and spellcasting.
- Strength: Strength is important in battle and in some cases spellcasting.
- Agility: Agility is need for battle, spellcasting and special commands.
- Intellect: Intellect is important for spellcasting and battle.
- Stamina: Stamina reflects how long a character can sustain a battle until resting is required. While the other four stats are required for spellcasting, stamina is solely required for weapon based fighting and such can only be upgraded by leveling up, magical components, or battle.

Each bar's length can be increased by leveling up (after a certain amount of fighting and/or spell casting) or by taking potions or reading scrolls to increase their strength. Money takes on the form of valuables such as copper pieces and gold bars which takes up room in the character's inventory. In this form, they can be traded and bestowed onto others although they can not be spent. When the player dies while holding these gems, they will be lost to scavengers. It is imperative they are deposited in "Auto Tellers" in order to convert them into currency and thus safe from looting. The world's currency can be spent at numerous stores around the world to purchase both weapons, armour, magical components, and nourishment.

Gameplay items include magical potions, scrolls, and wands (which can help to replenish the status bars, increase the bars' lengths, or aid in fighting monsters) as well as useless items which can only be eliminated by depositing them in recycling bins. Miscellaneous items such as checkers can be bought, although they serve no purpose other than gifts.

Bestowing gifts onto others will increase their happiness and lower their hostility to the player. Low level non-playable characters and enemies only require cheap items to make them happy, while the higher level ones demand pricier gifts. The player also can cast one of several spells, including both built-in and hidden spells.

== Reception ==
The original XOR version of TaskMaker was reviewed negatively in MacWEEK, which compared it unfavorably to contemporary Macintosh role-playing video games The Bard's Tale, Might and Magic, and Pool of Radiance. MacWEEK noted the game's quick and controllable fun, but claimed that it lacked richness and had less enticing graphics compared to the other titles. The Macintosh IIx version of the game got 4 out of 5 stars in Dragon; the reviewers said that it was "not hard" but added, "it is proven that those who write game code specifically for one computer system and don't rely on a port of another system's code usually publish a better-than-average game." The Lessers also noted that the game's graphics were reminiscent of the Mac game OrbQuest, in that "[y]ou have a top-down view of your area, in black and white and shades of gray."

"Though not state-of-the-art in gaming technology", Computer Gaming World's Chuck Miller in June 1994 said, the shareware TaskMaker 2.0 "is nonetheless a very solid, professional production ... an enjoyable, if slightly dated RPG" comparable to Ultima III through V. Inside Mac Games rated the shareware version of the game four out of five and called the re-release "a superb update to the original". Inside Mac Games selected the re-released Taskmaker as best shareware game of 1993. Allgame critic Lisa Karen Savignano gave the Storm Impact version of the game four-and-a-half stars out of five. She thought that although it did not have a very strong replay value, it had solid graphics and sound, as well as complex puzzles and a well-detailed manual to aid in gameplay.

== The Tomb of the TaskMaker ==
Storm Impact released a sequel entitled The Tomb of the TaskMaker in 1997. In The Tomb of the Taskmaker, the protagonist is now the leader of the land, and is informed by messengers of various tasks that he or she has to do to restore peace. As with TaskMaker, the tasks in the sequel involve retrieving artifacts that must be brought back to the throne, but unlike in the predecessor, said artifacts are destroyed afterward. After the ninth task, the player is told by a messenger that the TaskMaker has come back to life in his tomb and that he is the one depositing these evil artifacts around the world. The final task involves entering the tomb, where the player discovers that the TaskMaker is dead, and a captain guard who has been protecting the TaskMaker's bones states that he is the true mastermind and attempts to kill the player with his cohort of guards. The player then has to defeat the captain guard and his assistants to win the game; as in the first game, defeating the final villain unlocks a Master menu.

The Tomb of the TaskMaker features additional gameplay aspects, while retaining many elements of the first game such as the use of weapons, potions, spells and wands, and most of the monster designs. New options include the ability to choose a male or female character, as well as the role of magician, fighter or thief. A fighter can use every form of weapon and armor, a magician can cast certain spells that other players cannot, and a thief can pick locks and steal objects. Although only the fighter can wield and wear every piece of weapon and armour in the game, the most powerful ones can be wielded and worn by all three classes.

The game was released just before Storm Impact closed, and never made it past version 1.0 until Cook posted an updated test version (which fixed several bugs from the original version and added two new dungeons) on his personal website in July 2008.

With Storm Impact's closure that same year, both TaskMaker games are no longer supported. According to Cook's official website, both are still covered by intellectual property rights, including copyrights.
