= Unigine =

Proprietary cross-platform game engine

UNIGINE Engine
- Developer: Unigine Company
- Release: 0.3 / May 4, 2005; 21 years ago
- Stable release: 2.22 / September 10, 2026; 2 months ago
- Written in: C++ (runtime); C# (scripting); UnigineScript (scripting)
- Operating system: Linux and Windows
- Platform: Windows, Linux
- Available in: English
- License: Proprietary
- Website: unigine.com

UNIGINE is a proprietary cross-platform game engine developed by UNIGINE Company used in simulators, virtual reality systems, serious games and visualization. It supports OpenGL 4, Vulkan and DirectX 12.

The engine is used in benchmarks which are used by publications such as Tom's Hardware, Linus Tech Tips, PC Gamer, and JayzTwoCents. UNIGINE benchmarks are also included as part of the Phoronix Test Suite for benchmarking purposes on Linux and other systems.

== UNIGINE 1 ==
The first public release was the 0.3 version on May 4, 2005.

=== Platforms ===
UNIGINE 1 supported Microsoft Windows, Linux, OS X, PlayStation 3, Android, and iOS. Experimental support for WebGL existed but was not included into the official SDK. UNIGINE 1 supported DirectX 9, DirectX 10, DirectX 11, OpenGL, OpenGL ES and PlayStation 3, while initial versions (v0.3x) only supported OpenGL.

UNIGINE 1 provided C++, C#, and UnigineScript APIs for developers. It also supported the shading languages GLSL and HLSL.

=== Game features ===
UNIGINE 1 had support for large virtual scenarios and specific hardware required by professional simulators and enterprise VR systems, often called serious games.

Support for large virtual worlds was implemented via double precision of coordinates (64-bit per axis), zone-based background data streaming, and optional operations in geographic coordinate system (latitude, longitude, and elevation instead of X, Y, Z).

Display output was implemented via multi-channel rendering (network-synchronized image generation of a single large image with several computers), which typical for professional simulators. The same system enabled support of multiple output devices with asymmetric projections (e.g. CAVE). Curved screens with multiple projectors were also supported. UNIGINE 1 had stereoscopic output support for anaglyph rendering, separate images output, Nvidia 3D Vision, and virtual reality headsets. It also supported multi-monitor output.

=== Other features ===
UNIGINE rendered supported Shader model 5.0 with hardware tessellation, DirectCompute, and OpenCL. It also used screen space ambient occlusion and real-time global illumination. UNIGINE used a proprietary physics engine to process events such as collision detection, rigid body physics, and dynamical destruction of objects. It also used a proprietary engine for path finding and basic AI components. UNIGINE had features such as interactive 3D GUI, video playback using Theora codec, 3D audio system based on OpenAL library, WYSIWYG scene editor (UNIGINE Editor).

== UNIGINE 2 ==
UNIGINE 2 was released on October 10, 2015.

UNIGINE 2 has all features from UNIGINE 1 and transitioned from forward rendering to deferred rendering approach, PBR shading, and introduced new graphical technologies like geometry water, multi-layered volumetric clouds, SSRTGI and voxel-based lighting.

=== Platforms ===
UNIGINE 2 supports Microsoft Windows, Linux and OS X (support stopped starting from 2.6 version).

UNIGINE 2 also supports the following graphical APIs: DirectX 11, OpenGL 4.x. Since version 2.16 UNIGINE experimentally supports DirectX 12 and Vulkan.

There are 3 APIs for developers: C++, C#, Unigine Script.

Supported Shader languages: HLSL, GLSL, UUSL (Unified UNIGINE Shader Language).

=== SSRTGI ===
Proprietary SSRTGI (Screen Space Ray-Traced Global Illumination) rendering technology was introduced in version 2.5. It was presented at SIGGRAPH 2017 Real-Time Live! event.

== Development ==
The roots of UNIGINE are in the frustum.org open source project, which was initiated in 2002 by Alexander "Frustum" Zapryagaev, who is a co-founder (along with Denis Shergin, CEO) and ex-CTO of UNIGINE Company.

=== Linux game competition ===
On November 25, 2010, UNIGINE Company announced a competition to support Linux game development. They agreed to give away a free license of the UNIGINE engine to anyone willing to develop and release a game with a Linux native client, and would also grant the team a Windows license. The competition ran until December 10, 2010, with a considerable number of entries being submitted. Due to the unexpected response, UNIGINE decided to extend the offer to the three best applicants, with each getting full UNIGINE licenses. The winners were announced on December 13, 2010, with the developers selected being Kot-in-Action Creative Artel (who previously developed Steel Storm), Gamepulp (who intend to make a puzzle platform), and MED-ART (who previously worked on Painkiller: Resurrection).

== UNIGINE-based projects ==
As of 2021, company claimed to have more than 250 B2B customers worldwide.

Some companies that develop software for professional aircraft, ships & vehicle simulators use UNIGINE Engine as a base for the 3D & VR visualization.

=== Games ===
Released

- Cradle - released for Windows and Linux in 2015
- Oil Rush - released for Windows, Linux and Mac OS X in 2012; released for iOS in 2013
- Syndicates of Arkon - released for Windows in 2010
- Tryst - released for Windows in 2012
- Petshop - released for Windows and Mac in 2011
- Sumoman - released for Windows and Linux in 2017
- Demolicious - released for iOS in 2012
- Acro FS - aerobatic flight simulator (Steam page)
- Dual Universe - released in 2022

Upcoming

- Dilogus: The Winds of War
- Node - VR shooter (Steam page)
- El Somni Quas - MMORPG (Patreon page)
- Pax Fracta: Normandy
- Rideshare "Stimulator" (Steam page)

=== Simulation and visualization ===
- Metro Simulator by Smart Simulation
- CarMaker 10.0 by IPG Automotive
- NAUTIS maritime simulators by VSTEP
- Train driver simulator by Oktal Sydac
- Be-200 flight simulator
- Klee 3D (3D visualization solution for digital marketing and research applications)
- The visualization component of the analytical software complex developed for JSC "ALMAZ-ANTEY" MSDB", an affiliate of JSC "Concern "Almaz-Antey"
- Real-time interactive architectural visualization projects of AI3D
- Bell-206 Ranger rescue helicopter simulator
- Magus ex Machina (3D animated movie)
- SIMREX CDS, SIMREX FDS, SIMREX FTS car driving simulators by INNOSIMULATION
- Real-time artworks by John Gerrard (artist): Farm, Solar Reserve, Exercise, Western Flag (Spindletop, Texas), X. laevis (Spacelab)
- Train simulators by SPECTR
- DVS3D by GDI
- RF-X flight simulator
- NAVANTIS Ship Simulator
- VR simulator for learning of computer vision for autonomous flight control at Daedalean AI

=== Benchmarks ===
UNIGINE Engine is used as a platform for a series of benchmarks, which can be used to determine the stability of PC hardware (CPU, GPU, power supply, cooling system) under extremely stressful conditions, as well as for overclocking:

- Superposition Benchmark (featuring online leaderboards) - UNIGINE 2 (2017)
- Valley Benchmark - UNIGINE 1 (2013)
- Heaven Benchmark (the first DirectX 11 benchmark) - UNIGINE 1 (2009)
- Tropics Benchmark - UNIGINE 1 (2008)
- Sanctuary Benchmark - UNIGINE 1 (2007)

== See also ==
- List of game engines
- List of game middleware
- Game physics
- 3D computer graphics
