= Through the Looking Glass (video game) =

1984 video game

- Developer: Steve Capps
- Publisher: Apple
- Platforms: Apple Macintosh, iOS
- Release: 1984
- Genre: Strategy
- Mode: Single player

Through the Looking Glass, also known as Alice, is a 1984 video game written for the Apple Lisa and Apple Macintosh computers. Written by a member of the Lisa and Mac teams, Steve Capps, it was one of the earliest video games on the Mac platform, part of the only games disk officially sold by Apple Computer during that era.

In the game, the player takes the role of Alice from Lewis Carroll's 1871 novel Through the Looking-Glass, and What Alice Found There (sequel to Alice's Adventures in Wonderland), who is opposed by the computer playing a complete set of chess players. Alice moves about the board in real time while attempting to capture the computer's pieces, while at the same time avoiding the computer's attempts to capturing her. To increase the skill level, Alice's moves are increasingly limited, while the computer increases the number of players it actively moves.

The game was re-released for iOS on the 25th anniversary of the Mac's release.

== History ==
In the fall of 1981, Steve Capps was a core member of the Lisa team working on printer support. In his spare time, he wrote Alice on the Lisa and started demonstrating the game to members of the team. Bruce Daniels, manager of the Lisa software team, demoed the game to Andy Hertzfeld and other members of the Mac team. They were impressed, and Daniels suggested that a Mac port would be possible if the Mac team lent him a prototype to use for porting.

Two days later, Capps returned with a working version. It soon became a favorite among the Mac team. Joanna Hoffman became particularly good at it and complained that it was too easy. Capps changed several parts of the game to make it increasingly challenging. Steve Jobs saw the game and was duly impressed. He soon started agitating for Capps to join the Mac team, but as a key member of the Lisa team, this was not possible. Jobs eventually arranged a deal that Capps could move after the Lisa was released, which occurred in January, 1983.

Capps became a key member of the Mac team, working on the Finder team and producing several pieces of early software, including the "Guided Tour" diskette that shipped with early machines. He continued making improvements to the game throughout this period as well. Several variations of the basic game appeared, including one where squares of the board would randomly disappear. This version was shown in the attract mode display for the game.

By the fall of 1983, Capps was looking for routes to release the game commercially. The recently formed Electronic Arts was explored, but Jobs convinced Capps that Apple would do a better job of it. The game was featured during the release of the Mac in the spring of 1984. However, while progressing to commercial release, they discovered that the name "Alice" was being used by a database management program, so the name was changed to Through the Looking Glass.

Although not the first Mac game—the first Macintosh shipped with Puzzle, a built-in Desk Accessory—Through the Looking Glass remains the only game ever written and published directly by Apple, as opposed to the many games it resells. Apple was fighting the perception that the Mac was not a serious computer, and downplayed the game-playing aspects of the machine.

== Description ==
Through the Looking Glass takes place on a conventional chess board, shown in exaggerated 3D perspective. The computer's players are initially laid out in normal chess fashion, at the "far end" of the board. During the new-game start up, one of each of the different pieces travels down the board toward the player, lining up in front of them. Clicking on any one of the pieces starts the game, with Alice being allowed to make the moves of the selected piece.

The player moves Alice to any allowable position by clicking on the board. Alice initially moves like a queen, along the rank and file or diagonals. The game allows "click ahead", so the player can click on new positions while the on-screen character is still moving in response to earlier instructions. The player attempts to "capture" the computer's pieces by landing on them, just as in the case of a normal game of chess. The computer player initially moves a single player at a time, attempting to capture Alice, as well as aggressively promoting pawns for queening.

The player scores points by capturing the computer's players and loses points when the computer captures Alice. The game has several speed settings, which were described even by the author as "impossible" on the fastest setting. Selecting a different player at the start of the game, the pawn for instance, limits Alice's moves to provide an even greater difficulty.

The game's settings and options are hidden, accessed by clicking on the score at the top of the screen. This causes an image of the Cheshire Cat to fade in over the board. Various settings are changed by clicking on different portions of the Cat.

The game was packaged in a fabric covered box designed to look like a hardcover book. Opening the front cover reveals the instructions and diskette within, and the instructions printed on the inside cover. The disk also contains two other small programs written by Capps, an on-screen "Dali" clock program-cum-screensaver that morphs digits as the time changes, and Amazing, a program that builds complex mazes and lets the user solve them by dragging the mouse.

== Re-release ==
For the 25th anniversary of the launch of the Mac, in 2009 Capps re-released the game as AliceX for iOS on the iTunes Store. The new version includes several different sets of pieces and other options. A simplified version written in JavaScript is available on Capps' web site, onedoto.
