= Basketball Challenge =

1987 video game

- Developer(s): XOR Corporation
- Publisher(s): XOR Corporation
- Platform(s): IBM PC

Basketball Challenge is a computer game developed by the XOR Corporation in 1987 for the IBM PC and compatibles.

== Gameplay ==
Basketball Challenge is a game in which the player is the coach of a basketball team, and determines how the team uses plays and sets, as well as what they do for offense and defense. The basketball players are represented by numbers on the court shown on screen, and the coach must utilize the team's star players effectively and get the best performance out of the other team members. Basketball Challenge is designed for one or two players, although a human opponent can play against the computer or let the computer run as both players. At the beginning of the game the player is given the option to choose offensive and defensive plays including lineup and tempo. During the game you have the ability to communicate with team players. You also have the ability to coach a player and this can lead to changing tactics or even substituting players during deadball.

== Reception ==
In 1988, Dragon gave the game 3½ out of 5 stars. Computer Gaming World recommended Basketball Challenge to "those who have always wanted to be college coaches", with its strategic depth compensating for the lack of graphics.

== Reviews ==
- PC Games
