= Steve Capps =

American computer programmer, software engineer, and interface designer

Steve Capps is a pioneering American computer programmer and software engineer, who was one of the original designers of the Apple Macintosh computer and co-designers of the Finder in the 1980s. He also led development of the Apple Newton PDA and designed music software such as SoundEdit, before developing user interface (UI) designs for Microsoft's Internet Explorer and online/mobile payment systems.

== Early life and education ==
While a computer science student at the Rochester Institute of Technology (RIT), Steve Capps started working at the Xerox Corporation and learned about graphical user interfaces (GUI). Capps graduated from RIT with a Bachelor of Science degree.

In 1979, Capps wrote and designed Dali Clock for the Xerox Alto, the first GUI personal computer workstation. Capps' inspiration was the morphing effect seen in Peter Foldes' 1974 short computer animated film La Faim (Hunger), with key-frame animation by software engineer Nestor Burtnyk and physicist Marceli Wein.

== Career ==
=== Apple Computer, Inc. ===
Capps joined Apple Computer, Inc. in 1981 after leaving the Xerox Corporation, and he worked with a small team of programmers and hardware engineers put together by Apple co-founder Steve Jobs in Cupertino, California. Xerox had a research center in Palo Alto, California named Xerox PARC, where Jobs had seen an Alto computer prototype. Capps began working on the Apple Lisa project in 1981 on the printing team. Capps was then selected by Jobs to join the Apple Macintosh software team in January 1983, principally writing the Finder (along with Bruce Horn) and Macintosh system utilities such as ResEdit. Capps also wrote a disk utility to transfer data from the Lisa to the Mac. Capps updated his Dali Clock for the original Macintosh 128K in 1984.

The New York Times journalist and computer historian John Markoff said Capps gave Apple's Macintosh "its distinctive look and feel," and represented the company's "most direct link to its early innovative tradition."

In 1984, Capps and Horn joined members of the original Macintosh team and Apple co-founder Steve Wozniak for a Boston Computer Society Q&A panel after one of Jobs' earliest public demonstrations of the Mac - other team members present were Bill Atkinson, Owen Densmore, Andy Hertzfeld, Rony Sebok, Burrell Smith, and Randy Wigginton. Capps was named an Apple Fellow in 1994.

==== Alice: Through the Looking Glass (video game) ====
For both the Lisa and Mac, Capps created one of the earliest computer video games, Through the Looking Glass (aka Alice), in which users controlled an Alice character on a three dimensional chess board. The game was the only one to be self-published as a retail product by Apple, and it was shipped in 1984 with elaborate packaging for the floppy disk that included other Capps projects as bonuses, such as Clock (based on Dali Clock), the Amazing maze generator, and a font named Cartoon. Stewart Brand said in 1984, "I think the Mac is going to be a great game machine, and ALICE is the first proof."

=== Digital Audio Software ===
During a break from Apple from 1985 to 1987, Capps spent several years working in computer music and interface design. In 1986, he wrote three music programs including Jam Session, SoundEdit, and Super Studio Session; SoundEdit was eventually sold to Macromedia and discontinued in 2004.

=== Apple Newton ===
From 1987 to 1996, Capps led the development of the Newton handheld computer while at Apple. Handwriting recognition was a key part of the plan. Capps was the chief architect and Apple Fellow for the Apple Newton, where he led the specification and development of the user interface of Newton, shepherded the team of software developers, and wrote many portions of the built-in application software. Capps worked as head of user interface and software development on the Newton handheld device under the leadership of John Sculley, Apple's CEO at that time.

Although the Newton failed to catch on as a personal digital assistant (PDA) and was discontinued in 1997, it was the first computer designed to fit in people's pockets when it was shipped in August 1993 and it proved influential. Capps later said, "The goals were to design a new category of handheld device and to build a platform to support it. The restrictions imposed by battery life necessitated a new architecture."

=== Microsoft and Internet Explorer ===
Capps resigned from Apple in 1996 to pursue ideas related to the Internet. From 1996 until 2001, he was a user interface architect at Microsoft. His early work at Microsoft resulted in the Internet Explorer Search, History, and Favorites panes. He was also a co-founder of the MSN Explorer project.

=== Later work ===
After leaving Microsoft, Capps became an independent developer. He founded Onedoto, which developed user interfaces, software, and hardware. In 2009, Capps created the game AliceX for the iPhone based on his earlier game Through the Looking Glass (aka Alice).

As of 2010, Capps was working at Silicon Valley start-up Kwedit, focusing on online payment systems.

Capps then became Chief Innovator at financial technology company PayNearMe, where he developed and designed PayNearMe's user interface for scalable, easy-to-use mobile payments. In June 2023, Capps became the first PayNearMe Fellow.

Capps holds more than 65 patents that span hardware, software, music, and toys.

== Personal life ==
Capps married lawyer Marie D'Amico. Their child Emma Capps was born in 1997.
