= Storm Impact =

- Type: Private
- Industry: Video games
- Founded: 1989
- Defunct: 1997
- Headquarters: Glenview, Illinois, United States
- Owner: David Cook
- Website: www.robotroom.com/StormImpact.html

Storm Impact was a Macintosh software developer and publisher located in Glenview, Illinois, active from 1989 to 1997. Storm Impact's development team consisted of David Cook and artist Tom Zehner, with help from Dan Schwimmer and Dave Friedman. Storm Impact initially licensed their products to third-party publishers, but switched to self-publishing their products as shareware in 1993.

== Products ==
Storm Impact's first product was the role-playing video game TaskMaker, released in 1989 by XOR Corporation. In 1990, XOR released Storm Impact's most commercially successful published product, the skiing sim MacSki. MacSki was reviewed positively in Macworld, and was inducted into the Macworld Game Hall of Fame as Best Sports Game for 1990.

In 1993, Storm Impact released its most commercially successful shareware product, an upgraded version of TaskMaker. In 1994, Storm Impact released an upgraded shareware version of MacSki.

In 1996, Storm Impact released the shareware shoot 'em up Asterbamm and the technical support utility Technical Snapshot. David Cook describes both releases as "sales bombs". In 1997, Storm released The Tomb of the TaskMaker, a sequel to TaskMaker.

== Litigation ==
In 1998, Storm Impact and David Cook sued Software of the Month Club, a California corporation that distributed a commercial shareware compilation CD-ROM including the shareware versions of TaskMaker and MacSki. Storm Impact and Cook alleged that Software of the Month Club's distribution of Storm Impact's products constituted copyright infringement, unfair competition, false designation of origin, and deceptive trade practices.

United States District Judge James Zagel found for Storm on the count of copyright infringement, stating that Software of the Month Club "unquestionably violated the express restrictions of both TaskMaker and MacSki, eviscerating any claim that Storm effectively consented to unlimited distribution of its products by posting them on the Internet." Storm was awarded $20,000 in statutory damages.

== Demise ==
Storm Impact's owner David Cook attributes the company's demise to market change and undercapitalization. He notes a number of contributing factors: the Macintosh's market share had declined, game technology progressed beyond the company's ability to produce a competitive product, and the company's shareware model meant that developers had to process orders and support products years after their release.
