= Superposition Benchmark =

Computer benchmarking software

- Developer: UNIGINE Company
- Initial release: April 11, 2017; 9 years ago
- Stable release: 1.1
- Engine: UNIGINE Engine
- Operating system: Windows, Mac, Linux
- Platform: PC
- Available in: English, Russian
- License: Proprietary Freeware/Shareware
- Website: https://benchmark.unigine.com/superposition

Superposition Benchmark is a benchmarking software based on the UNIGINE Engine, developed and published by UNIGINE Company in 2017.

The main purpose of software is performance and stability testing, whenever is a GPUs, cooling, or power supplies. The benchmark 3D scene is an office of a fictional genius scientist from the middle of the 20th century rendered using SSRTGI (Screen-Space Ray-Traced Global Illumination), a proprietary dynamic lighting technology made by Unigine to test raytracing capabilities of GPUs. The workload's parameters can be set by the users, or by a low or extreme preset.

Superposition and other benchmarks by Unigine are often used by hardware reviewers to measure graphics performance (PCMag, Digital Trends, Lifewire and others) and by overclockers for online and offline competitions in GPU overclocking. Running Superposition (or another) benchmark by Unigine produces a performance score: the higher the numbers, the better the performance. Users can compare different configurations in the online leaderboards.

== Technological features ==
- Visuals powered by UNIGINE 2 Engine
- Support for Windows 7 SP1 x64, Windows 8 x64, Windows 10 x64, Linux x64, macOS
- hardware stability testing
- GPU temperature and clock monitoring
- SSRTGI (Screen-Space Ray-Traced Global Illumination) dynamic lighting technology
- VR experience (Oculus Rift, HTC Vive, HTC Vive Pro or any SteamVR compatible HMDs )
- Free exploration mode with mini-games
- Over 900 interactive objects
- Global leaderboards integration

== See also ==
- Benchmark
- Overclocking
