= Oil Rush =

2012 video game

- Developer: UNIGINE Holding S.à r.l.
- Publishers: UNIGINE Holding S.à r.l. Iceberg Interactive
- Designers: Vitaliy Sidorov, Stanislav Zagniy
- Engine: Unigine
- Platforms: Windows, Linux, OS X, Android, iOS
- Release: January 25, 2012
- Genres: Real-time strategy, tower defense
- Modes: Single-player, multiplayer

Oil Rush is a tower defense real-time strategy game developed by UNIGINE Holding S.à r.l. using their Unigine engine technology. Set in a flooded, post-apocalyptic world, the game consists of players fighting over control of the world's last remaining oil reserves. The game was released as a digital download for Microsoft Windows, Linux, and OS X.

This theme has been viewed as controversial by some, especially as Oil Rush was originally intended to be released only a little more than a year after the much publicized Deepwater Horizon oil spill. The game itself actually delivers an environmental warning message, with Unigine's CEO Denis Shergin commenting that "Fuel devouring armies that fight over the last drops of oil and pollute already trashed world is nothing but doublethink. That is a warning environmental message we'd like to deliver in a single-player campaign."

== Plot ==
In Oil Rush, the player is shown the viewpoint and story of Kevin, a recent graduate and serviceman, following in his father's footsteps who has recently died. He is almost immediately tasked by The Commander to suppress a rebel faction, The Raiders, who are trying to take control of the oil rigs in the army's possession. Now in control of a fleet of combat units, an in-game guidance PDA issues the player basic instructions to help learn how to complete the set of objectives they are assigned, such as deploying only 25 percent of the combat units, production of armed defense units on oil rigs in your control, and dividing forces into groups to attack opposing rigs simultaneously.

== Gameplay ==
The game combines elements of strategy and tower defense as players must defend and attack oil rigs through the use of armed platforms against hordes of enemy watercraft and other attack units. The campaign's story puts the player in the shoes of Kevin, a graduate of the military academy and disciple of The Commander in a story-driven succession, while multiplayer allows players to go head-to-head against friends or online opponents in a strategic manner. Players are forced to maintain, upgrade, defend, and attack oil rigs put in various locations on each map.

== Development ==
Although originally planned to be released in the fourth quarter of 2010, the game was later delayed until March 2011 due to more development time being needed as well as more time to negotiate with potential publishers. It was then further delayed until June 2011 to allow more time to work on the single-player campaign. The ability to pre-order the game has been available since March 2, 2011.

Unigine worked on development throughout 2011, providing incremental updates to the beta builds for those who pre-ordered the game. Over time, noteworthy fixes and updates came through in the form of improved gamma control on Windows and Linux platforms, fixing anti-aliasing issues, debugging, performance optimizations, usability fixes, subtitles, voice-overs, and 3D capability for users with certain high-end graphics cards, amongst much more. Each update was rolled out in around two weeks of the last, continuing improvement on the game. In the last update before release, version 0.98, Unigine's changelog noted that it had included splashes during the introduction of its partners, including NVIDIA and RakNet.

Though originally uninterested in an OS X release of the game, Unigine later announced that they intended to launch a native OS X version of the game.

== Release ==
The game was released internationally on January 25, 2012 through digital portals including Desura, Ubuntu Software Center, and finally launching on Steam later the same day. Independent European publisher Iceberg Interactive signed with Unigine to secure retail distribution of Oil Rush in the United Kingdom, Germany, France, Scandinavia, Australia, New Zealand, and South Africa, set to be released on February 24, 2012 throughout Europe, with a fully localized version for the German market to follow on March 23, 2012.

Android version was released on March 18, 2013. iOS version was released on October 24, 2013.

== Reception ==
Since its announcement, the game has garnered much attention from Linux-oriented tech sites and blogs, the most notable of which would be Phoronix and received much praise for its graphics and gameplay even during its beta testing stages. Phoronix featured many articles about it for over a year and a half, before releasing their release date announcement and unofficial review of the game, going on to say, "Even if you're not the biggest Linux gamer or a real-time strategy fan, I still would recommend picking up this $20 USD Linux-native title on the basis of supporting Unigine Corp as one of the leading Linux-friendly commercial game studios".

On the review aggregator website Metacritic, Destructoid's Maurice Tan reviewed the game and gave it a rating of 8.0 out of 10. He noted, "What could have been a messy title merely created to showcase the Unigine Engine has turned out to be a surprisingly polished and deep strategy game. Oil Rush isn't just a joy to behold in action, but manages to make an old genre feel fresh while looking the part." Later in the review, he said of the game that it was "one of the first strategy surprises of the year" and that the "simple design of hop-skip-jump platform fights hides layers of depths that make it an easy-to-learn, hard-to-master arcade naval warfare experience."
