= NFL Challenge =

1985 video game

- Developer: XOR Corporation
- Publisher: XOR Corporation
- Platform: MS-DOS
- Release: 1985
- Genres: Sports, American football

NFL Challenge is a video game for MS-DOS released in 1985 by XOR Corporation. It uses statistical models for not only the NFL season, but also the outcome of a single football game.

== Game play ==
Unlike most football games, this one was more abstract. The players acted as coaches, picking the offensive or defensive plays from a series of nested menus. The computer then ran the plays against each other, using the pre-configured abilities of the teams and players picked.

There was no interaction once the play was called, other than making a decision to accept or deny a penalty if called. This made for an abstract game, unlike others where the player actually participated in the offense or defense.

One of the user changeable features of the game was that you could create or edit your own dream team, or enhance the performance of a particular current player who was having a good season, via a simple text edit of the roster files. The rosters were all named by team with player numbers as opposed to names being stored, but you easily determine which player was which and arrange trades, enhancements, or create an All-Pro team to play against regular teams.

== Reception ==
Computer Gaming World called NFL Challenge "the finest computer sports game I've ever seen. It is a high-tech, state-of-the-art simulation that is truly remarkable in recreating the 'feel' of a professional football game". It cited the documentation, detailed and accurate playbook, and team statistics as strengths, while lack of player names or statistics was a weakness, and concluded "Visicalc is the program that sold Apple computers, NFLC may be the one that sells IBM PC's to sports gamers".

Wyatt Lee reviewed the game for Computer Gaming World, and stated that "still, to this date, the cream of the crop."

== Cultural references ==
ESPN used the simulation in 1988 for a program called NFL Dream Season. Historic NFL teams were computer-simulated against one another in an eight-week season, then playoffs, then the "Dream Bowl". ESPN used the computer simulation results to play back the game using NFL Films footage to make it appear that one was watching an actual game. The 1978 Pittsburgh Steelers defeated the 1972 Miami Dolphins 21–20.

The following year, ESPN broadcast Dream Bowl II, with the defending champion 1978 Steelers pitted against the then-Super Bowl Champion San Francisco 49ers. Even with John Stallworth out early in the game due to an injury, the Steelers defeated the 49ers in overtime after a Joe Montana pass was intercepted around midfield by Mel Blount, who returned the interception for a touchdown. Steve Sabol, NFL Films president, disagreed with the simulation result, feeling that San Francisco had a better team.

XOR made available the Dream Season disk after the show's run, with the actual teams used by ESPN's program.
