= Heaven Benchmark =

Type of benchmarking software

- Developer: UNIGINE Company
- Release: October 22, 2009; 16 years ago
- Stable release: 4.0
- Engine: UNIGINE Engine
- Operating system: Windows, Mac, Linux
- Platform: PC
- Available in: English, Russian
- License: Proprietary Freeware/Shareware
- Website: https://benchmark.unigine.com/heaven

Heaven Benchmark is benchmarking software based on the UNIGINE Engine. The benchmark was developed and published by UNIGINE Company in 2009. The main purpose of software is performance and stability testing for GPUs. Users can choose a workload preset, Basic or Extreme, or set the parameters by custom. The benchmark 3D scene is a steampunk-style city on flying islands in the middle of the clouds. The scene is GPU-intensive because of tessellation used for all the surfaces, dynamic sky with volumetric clouds and day-night cycle, real-time global illumination, and screen-space ambient occlusion.

Heaven and other benchmarks by UNIGINE Company are often used by hardware reviewers to compare performance of GPUs and by overclockers for online and offline competitions in GPU overclocking. Running Heaven (or another benchmark by UNIGINE Company) produces a performance score: the higher the numbers, the better the performance. Heaven Benchmark was shipped with Zotac GPUs. Included in Phoronix Test Suite.

Heaven Benchmark is claimed to be the first DirectX 11 benchmark. It was officially introduced at the Windows 7 presentation on October 22, 2009.

== Technological features ==
- Visuals powered by UNIGINE 1 Engine
- Support for Windows XP, Windows Vista, Windows 7, Windows 8, Linux, macOS
- Support for DirectX 9, DirectX 11 and OpenGL 4.0
- Support for NVIDIA SLI and AMD CrossFire
- GPU temperature and clock monitoring
- Adaptive hardware tessellation
- Dynamic sky with volumetric clouds and tweakable day-night cycle
- Real-time global illumination and screen-space ambient occlusion
- Support for stereoscopic 3D and multi-monitor configurations
- Cinematic and interactive fly/walk-through camera modes

== See also ==
- Benchmark
- Overclocking
