= SoundEdit =

Digital audio editor

- SoundEdit software icon
- Original author: Steve Capps
- Developers: Farallon Computing; Macromedia
- Release: January 1988; 38 years ago
- Operating system: Classic Mac OS
- Type: Audio editing

SoundEdit was the first popular GUI-based audio editor for digitized audio. It was one of the first significant audio applications for personal computers in general.

SoundEdit was known for its ease of use. It made audio manipulation accessible to those who were not musicians or audio professionals.

== History ==
SoundEdit was one of three audio applications created during a sabbatical by Steve Capps during 1986. The Macintosh had no built-in sound input, so the MacRecorder audio digitizer was invented for this purpose in 1985 by Michael Lamoureux, a mathematics student at the University of California, Berkeley. The MacRecorder hardware and software was publicly released through the Berkeley Macintosh Users Group as a kit in late 1985. SoundEdit first shipped in January 1988, as part of a hardware product called MacRecorder Sound System, by a company called Farallon Computing (which eventually became Netopia). The default sampling rate in SoundEdit was 22,256 Hz.

One of the major drivers for SoundEdit was Apple's HyperCard. With MacRecorder Sound System, stack makers could finally create alternatives to HyperCard's two built-in sounds. The other multimedia programs of the time, (Director and Authorware) also adopted it right away.

In 1991, SoundEdit was bought by Macromind-Paracomp, which became Macromedia (now Adobe Systems).

== SoundEdit 16 ==
Macromedia rebranded the program as 'SoundEdit 16' and expanded its capabilities to support CD-quality stereo audio (16-bit) and added QuickTime soundtrack editing and an audio plug-in architecture. The new version also supported handling of sound files bigger than available RAM. A free plug-in was included to convert sound files into '.SWA' format, an early form of mp3 file. These SWA files could be streamed to web viewers using by the free web audio player (downloadable from Macromedia) or by creating a custom interactive Shockwave experience embedded into a web page. Shockwave content is created by using the Director multimedia authoring program.

The SoundEdit 16 software was discontinued by Macromedia in December 2004. The final version only runs on PowerPC Macs running Classic Mac OS. It does not run under Mac OS X.
