= XOR Corporation =

Video game company

XOR Corporation (pronounced eks-or) was a video game developer and publisher based in Minnetonka, Minnesota, founded in 1982 by Glenn Diamond. XOR was active until 1990 and primarily released games for DOS and Macintosh, but also released the DOS business applications Blu Chip, a stock portfolio manager, and Thoth, a database manager, and the C utility C Tools.

Two games published by XOR Corporation for Macintosh, MacGolf (1986) and MacSki (1990), were inducted into the Macworld Game Hall of Fame in the "Best Sports Game" category. MacGolf was a top-selling Macintosh game upon its release and had sold 70,000 copies by 1988; it was still the best-selling Macintosh game in September 1988.

In 1985 XOR released NFL Challenge, an American football simulation game officially endorsed by the NFL, for DOS and Macintosh. ESPN used NFL Challenge to simulate games for its NFL Dream Season television show, playing each game 100 times to determine the outcomes. NFL Challenge was the first software officially licensed by the NFL.

In the wake of NFL Challenge's success, XOR CEO Glenn Diamond approached the CIA in 1985 about an official endorsement and collaboration for an upcoming video game. The CIA rejected his proposal.

In 1985, XOR corporation collaborated with Timothy Leary on an unreleased video game, book, and possible companion album by Devo with the working title The Brain Game. The game intended to use Leary's brain models to increase the player's intelligence via a symbiotic process of psychological testing and self-reflection.

== Release history ==
=== Games ===
- St. Hippolyte's Wall - 1984, DOS
- Edo - 1984, DOS
- NFL Challenge - 1984, DOS; 1986, Mac
- MacGolf - 1986, Mac
- MacCourses- 1986. Mac
- Basketball Challenge - 1987, DOS
- Bermuda Square - 1987, DOS
- MacRacquetball - 1987, Mac
- Oligopoly - 1987, DOS
- PRO Challenge - 1987, DOS; 1987, Mac
- Lunar Rescue - 1988, Mac
- Road Racer - 1988, Mac
- Roboman - 1989, DOS
- TaskMaker - 1989, DOS
- MacGolf Classic - 1989, Mac
- MacSki - 1990, Mac

=== Business and utilities ===
- Thoth - 1984, DOS
- Blu Chip - 1984, DOS
- C Tools - 1984, DOS
