= OrbQuest: The Search For Seven Wards =

1986 video game

- Developers: QWare, Inc
- Publishers: QWare, Inc
- Programmers: Ed Schultz; Michael Mayer.
- Platform: Macintosh
- Release: 1986
- Genres: Adventure, Fantasy, Role-playing

OrbQuest: The Search For Seven Wards is a computer game developed by QWare, Inc. for the Apple Macintosh.

== Plot ==
OrbQuest is an adventure/fantasy role-playing game that involves a powerful, mystic object known as the Orb, which has been shattered into seven pieces called Wards. The seven Wards were scattered to the seven corners of the world, with each Ward located inside a pyramid. King Cricken inadvertently destroyed the Orb while using magic to send the Evil Ones home to their netherworld, and then the King also disappeared with a flash of thunder. While the Evil forces were weakened temporarily, they have begun to become powerful again. The player character must resume the quest of King Cricken by finding all the pieces of the Orb and reassemble the device to end the spread of Evil.

== Gameplay ==
The player controls the movement of the character onscreen by moving the mouse in the direction the player wants the adventurer to move. By moving the character over a city, town, or pyramid, the player double-clicks on that icon so the character enters the interior of that locale. Movement using the mouse also moves the character to the businesses and temples within a city. A game in progress can only be saved while the character is in a town or city.

When confronted by an opponent, the player moves the character adjacent to the monster and moves the cursor over the monster, pressing the mouse "fire" button to attack. A message on screen notifies the player how much the damage both the creature and the character suffer as they attack each other. The character has the attributes of Strength, Intelligence, Wisdom, Dexterity, Charisma and Constitution, each of which is determined randomly by the computer, although the player can reroll as many times as desired. The player can either use an existing character or create a new one when loading the game. The player selects class, gender, and race. The three available player classes are fighter, spellcaster, and thief, and the available races are elf, dwarf, halfling, half-orc, and human.

== Development ==
OrbQuest was developed for the Apple Macintosh computer by QWare, Inc., which was based in Richardson, Texas. Created by Ed Schultz and Michael Mayer.

== Reception ==
The game was reviewed in 1987 in Dragon #118 by Hartley and Patricia Lesser in "The Role of Computers" column. According to the reviewers, "OrbQuest is quite an enjoyable adventure — one that is not difficult to master, but that requires some modicum of thought." In a subsequent column, the reviewers gave the game 3 out of 5 stars.

Macworld praises OrbQuest's large map, stating that "The best feature of OrbQuest is its grand scope: the great distances to be traveled and the exhaustive search, which is the essence of a good quest" but criticizes its unoriginality, expressing that "unfortunately, the game lacks imaginative twists. There is little need for strategic thinking. An experienced player may find OrbQuest too familiar, too straightforward, and derivative of more creative predecessors." Macworld follows this point by comparing OrbQuest to Ultima II and Ultima III, stating that they remain "a superior game in most respects" compared to OrbQuest. Despite these criticisms, Macworld calls OrbQuest "easy to understand, fun to play, and not an easy win", furthermore stating that "[OrbQuest] does not advance the art and science of digital adventuring but does offer a hide-and-seek game of substantial breadth."

MacUser gave OrbQuest a 4 out of 5 rating, describing it as a "very solid, very playable adventure game" with similar gameplay to Ultima, but lacking the sophistication of that series. MacUser praised the game's humor and creativity and noted its high degree of difficulty. A review published in the April 1987 issue of QuestBusters was substantially less favorable, criticizing the game's similarities to Ultima III, simplistic puzzles and lack of difficulty. The reviewer argued that the ability to restore saved games made it easy to exploit the game's economy and bypass challenges, ultimately declining to recommend it. In a 1995 retrospective review, Inside Mac Games called OrbQuest "a bright and imaginative (if not at times sneaky) and highly addictive game."
