= Jam Session (software) =

Musical software

Jam Session is a digital audio workstation software application for Classic Mac OS. It is the 1988 successor to Studio Session, a 1986 software program for Classic Mac OS. It was created by Macintosh and Newton pioneer Steve Capps and musician Ed Bogas. Jam Session was published by Broderbund Software. Studio Session was published by Bogas Productions.

== Overview ==
Studio Session differed from other audio creation packages as it used 8-bit audio samples of real instruments rather than sounds generated by the Macintosh sound chip, as did packages such as MusicWorks and Deluxe Music Construction Set. It was capable of playing back 6 tracks simultaneously in the original version, updated later to 8. There were two modes or screens, the authoring screen and the playback-only screen. In the authoring screen, the user entered notes on a staff with treble and bass clef using the mouse, and selecting the duration of the note with on-screen buttons or keyboard shortcuts. In the playback screen, an animated simulation of a VU-meter was displayed for each track.

The package shipped with a selection of several sampled instruments and several add-on packages were later released, such as the Heavy Metal Instrument pack that included more drum and guitar samples. Other packs were Country and Brass. The music samples provided were created by Gary Clayton working with Ed Bogas' band. The user was not provided with any software for creating their own instruments for use in Studio Session, however it was possible to record new instruments or convert existing samples using commercially available audio-editing software such as SoundWave from Impulse Inc with the MacNifty Audio Digitzer.

== Reception ==
Compute! called Jam Session "a strange, entrancing thrill", stating that it was harder to use than Instant Music but provided more control. It won the 1987 Software Publishers Association awards for Best Graphics and Best Entertainment Program. The New York Times said "musicians as well as novices can have fun with the program.”

== New version ==
In 1989 Broderbund released a new version of Jam Session for the Macintosh II and SE. Additionally a version of the Apple IIGS computer was released, differing in its utilization of full color graphics for animated performance scenes and 15 voice stereo music. Musical themes featured in this version were Pop Rock, Heavy Metal, Country, Classical Concert Hip-Hop, Rap and Jazz. Users loaded a song from a specific theme and simply "jammed" along using the keyboard to play accompanying instruments, which had the option of being auto-harmonized and auto-timed to match with the musical score playing.
