= SoftPC =

Software emulator

- Developers: Rod MacGregor, Henry Nash & Phil Bousfield
- Operating system: Unix, Classic Mac OS, IRIX, Solaris, HP-UX, IBM AIX, NeXTSTEP, OpenVMS, Ultrix, Tru64, Atari TOS
- Platform: Motorola 88000, Motorola 68000, MIPS, SPARC, PA-RISC, PowerPC, VAX, DEC Alpha
- Type: Emulator

SoftPC is a software emulator of x86 hardware. It was developed by Rod MacGregor, Henry Nash & Phil Bousfield, following the founding of Insignia Solutions in 1986 by MacGregor, with "about a dozen people who had left the CAD/CAM workstation specialist Computervision", believing in a market opportunity for an independent CAD/CAM consultancy. Originally a side project, SoftPC quickly became the main focus for the company, running PC software on workstations. Originally developed on SPARCstations, the first customer to license the software was Intergraph whose workstation had a proprietary processor architecture. Available originally on UNIX workstations to run MS-DOS, the software was ported to the Macintosh in 1987, and later gained the ability to run Microsoft Windows software. Besides Mac OS, supported platforms included SGI IRIX, Sun Solaris, HP-UX, IBM AIX, NeXTSTEP, Motorola 88000, OpenVMS on VAX and DEC Alpha systems, DEC ULTRIX, and others.

Bundles of SoftPC with Windows (3.x, 95, 98) were called SoftWindows, although it was possible to install Windows into the basic SoftPC environment along with some special utilities provided by Insignia to achieve the same effect. The introduction of Windows and applications running in that environment, as opposed to DOS, changed the underlying conditions for emulators, and Insignia's SoftWindows product was described, in comparison to SoftPC, as "a complete redesign, mandated by the size and complexity of Windows programs". The execution characteristics, described as "narrow and deep" in DOS applications, were instead "broad and shallow" in Windows applications, making it more difficult to identify sections of code for translation to the native architecture of the computer running the emulator.

Insignia entered into a development agreement with Microsoft giving the company access to Windows source code. This agreement covered the product then known as Windows 4 as well as Windows NT, on which Microsoft was seeking to support compatibility for Intel architecture binaries on RISC architecture systems. When Microsoft released Windows NT it included a subsystem ("WOW" - Windows on Windows, later NTVDM) for running virtualized 16-bit Windows (x86) programs. However, it had also made changes to Windows to allow it to run on alternative processors (Alpha, PowerPC), and for these an emulation layer was needed for programs compiled for Intel processors. Customized versions of Insignia's core emulation system were produced to this end, but the alternative NT architectures never became widely used.

Beginning in 1996, Insignia commanded the niche for this product area, but it soon faced heavy competition from Connectix with their Virtual PC product. Insignia sold the product line to FWB Software in October 1999 in order to focus on supplying implementations of Java for the mobile device market. FWB continued to sell SoftWindows until March 2001. FWB Software also marketed a separate version of the software that did not include a bundled copy of Windows, called RealPC, until 2003.

Unlike most emulators, the SoftWindows product used recompiled Windows components to improve performance in most business applications, providing almost native performance (but this meant that, unlike SoftPC, SoftWindows was not upgradable).

== Reception ==
BYTE in July 1988 said that SoftPC's "screen response, compared to other PC-compatibility products I've seen, was downright snappy", and that XyWrite III Plus ("one of the most ill-behaved PC programs in existence") ran well. The magazine concluded that for those needing to occasionally run DOS programs, "SoftPC is a viable option". MacUser in November 1988 rated it 3.5 mice out of 5. Noting its PC networking compatibility, the magazine said "If you'd like to access the company's database, see what your client sees on her screen, or capture a PC screen to plop into your Mac document, SoftPC is an excellent solution".

== See also ==
- Windows Interface Source Environment
