= Cradle (video game) =

2015 adventure video game

- Developer: Flying Cafe for Semianimals
- Publisher: Flying Cafe for Semianimals
- Engine: Unigine
- Platform: Windows
- Release: July 24, 2015
- Genre: Adventure game
- Mode: Single-player

Cradle is a 2015 science-fiction first-person adventure game on the topic of transhumanism, developed by Flying Cafe for Semianimals.

== Gameplay ==
Cradle is a first-person adventure game where the player solves puzzles in and around an abandoned amusement park located in the Mongolian steppe. The gameplay varies between solving inventory-based puzzles in the environment, and arcade-style platforming puzzles in a virtual space.

== Reception ==
Reception

Aggregate score
| Aggregator | Score |
|---|---|
| Metacritic | 65/100 |

Review scores
| Publication | Score |
|---|---|
| Adventure Gamers | 3/5 |
| Eurogamer | 5/10 |
| Giant Bomb | 4/5 |
| Kill Screen | 75/100 |

Cradle received "mixed or average reviews", according to the review aggregator Metacritic. The game was reviewed by various critics.
