= Kwedit =

Kwedit was a website that helped people without credit or debit cards purchase virtual goods online. People could purchase items online and promise to pay for the items later, through mail-in payments, payments at a 7-Eleven store, or through online credit card transactions. After Kwedit ceased operations, its Kwedit-Direct offering became PayNearMe, a service by paying for items purchased online at a 7-Eleven store.
