= NFL Dream Season =

1989 television show on ESPN

NFL Dream Season is a TV show broadcast on ESPN in 1989, in which 20 all-time great NFL teams competed against each other using the football simulation game NFL Challenge. NFL Films footage was used to create what appeared to be a "game" between the two teams. The 1978 Steelers beat the 1972 Dolphins to win the title.

In 1990, ESPN ran a one-off show with the 1989 Super Bowl Champion 49ers against the '78 Steelers.

In 1999, they produced a similar mini-series, featuring overall "decade" teams of the 60s Packers, 70s Steelers, 80s 49ers, and 90s Cowboys playing each other.

== Final standings and playoff results ==
=== East ===
- 1978 Steelers 6-0
- 1986 Giants 4-2
- 1959 Colts 3-3
- 1960 Eagles 2-4
- 1968 Jets 1-5

=== West ===
- 1984 49ers 5-1
- 1977 Cowboys 3-3
- 1983 Raiders 2-4
- 1963 Chargers 1-5
- 1951 Rams 1-5

=== North ===
- 1976 Raiders 6-0
- 1985 Bears 5-1
- 1966 Packers 4-2
- 1953 Lions 2-4
- 1964 Browns 1-5

=== South ===
- 1972 Dolphins 6-0
- 1982 Redskins 3-3
- 1955 Browns 3-3
- 1969 Chiefs 2-4
- 1971 Cowboys 0-6

== Semis ==
- 1978 Steelers over 84 49ers (21-20)
- 1972 Dolphins over 76 Raiders (24-21)

== Dream Bowl ==
- 1978 Steelers over 1972 Dolphins (21-20)
