= RealPC =

- Operating system: Classic Mac OS
- Available in: English
- Type: Virtual machine, emulator

RealPC was a Macintosh program that emulates an x86 PC, allowing the use of MS-DOS, Windows NT, Windows 95, and Windows 98. RealPC was compatible with PowerPC Macs running system software 7.1.2 through 9.2. Requirements were: Any Power Macintosh or Mac OS compatible, System 7.1.2 or later, Minimum 16 Mbytes of RAM, hard drive space for 50 Mbytes (MS-DOS), 60 Mbytes (Windows 3.x), 130 Mbytes (Windows 95), and any Macintosh compatible CD-ROM drive. RealPC emulated a Pentium-based PC with MMX technology, supported Sound Blaster and MMX, and allowed you to use a Macintosh joystick, allowing you to run PC programs, including MS-DOS and Windows, games and applications, alongside your existing Macintosh applications. RealPC was provided with MS-DOS 6.22 already installed, so you could immediately run MS-DOS games and applications on your Macintosh. Linux was not supported, and due to shared RAM between Mac OS and RealPC, Windows 98 was the reasonable limit. RealPC was able to convert Virtual-PC hard disk files to use and run the installed OS. Its box and CD featured the image of silent film star Harold Lloyd. RealPC was discontinued in 2003.

== Related links ==
RealPC is a rebranded SoftPC
