= Steel Storm =

- Steel Storm: Burning Retribution cover art as seen on Desura
- Developer: Kot-in-Action Creative Artel
- Publisher: Kot-in-Action Creative Artel
- Designer: Alexander Zubov
- Engine: DarkPlaces engine
- Platforms: Microsoft Windows, Mac OS X, Linux
- Release: Episode One: WW: September 9, 2010; Episode Two: WW: May 11, 2011
- Genre: Arcade shooter
- Modes: Single-player, Multiplayer

Steel Storm is an independent video game series developed by Kot-in-Action Creative Artel using the free software DarkPlaces engine that were released for Microsoft Windows, Mac OS X, and Linux platforms. The game was added to the Humble Indie Bundle 3 on August 1, 2011. The games are divided into two episodes, with Episode One being available at no charge and Episode Two (titled as Steel Storm: Burning Retribution) being a commercial product. They are top down arcade shooters where players control a hovercraft while battling presumed extraterrestrial invaders using a variety of different weapons.

== Gameplay ==
Both episodes of Steel Storm include complete single-player campaigns where the player must fight enemies, collect power-ups, and complete specified mission objectives. Steel Storm also allows for online and LAN multiplayer, supporting modes for both deathmatch and cooperative play (capture the flag is also available in episode two), with the game supporting up to sixteen players for each mode. The camera view for your ship is completely adjustable, and the second episodes also includes an unlockable first person camera mode. The game also supports an in-game map to help players navigate the levels.

== Development ==
Steel Storm has been under development since 2008, with the first episode being released as a beta in September 2010. Steel Storm: Burning Retribution was released on May 11, 2011 and is being sold through the Steam, Desura, and Ubuntu Software Center services as well as the developers website.

== Reception ==
Steel Storm has had a mixed response. Rebel Zero, who reviewed the first episode while it was still in beta, gave the game a positive review, stating that their "only disappointment comes from it being such a short game." DIYGamer described Episode One as a "highly polished, unique adventure shmup that really is worth your time." Make Tech Easier gave the game 5/5 stars, stating that the game "will not revolutionize shooters, and the strategy will not keep you up at night, but the gameplay is addictive enough to warrant the purchase." Games Fascination also praised Episode One, raving that it is "definitely an enjoyable game, especially for fans of the genre, and an impressive effort from an independent group."

OMG! Ubuntu!, in its review of Steel Storm: Burning Retribution, praised the game, calling it "a lovely game with enough features and options to keep you occupied for a fair amount of time." John Walker of Rock, Paper, Shotgun, who was also reviewing Burning Retribution, described the game as being "a really smart game, which is a real pleasure", as well as stating that the game is a "tremendous amount of fun." Walker summed up his review by stating that he would suggest that the game "is well worth it" for the low price that is being offered.

There are over 295,000 downloaded copies of Steel Storm, with 7% to 10% of those users being active players.

Less glowingly, review aggregator Metacritic gives the game a 55% based on 4 professional critics, indicating "Generally unfavorable reviews". The community reviews on Steam give the game a "Mixed Response" of 68%. Eurogamer gave the game a negative review and criticized the game for its "numbing monotony" and that the "repetition grinds you down".

== Spin-off ==
In 2011, work was started on a spin-off that will be a first-person shooter in the spirit of Doom and Quake.

== See also ==
- List of open source games
