= Yolka (gaffe) =

2010 error by Viktor Yanukovych

"Yolka" (Ukrainian: йолка) was a gaffe made in 2010 by the Ukrainian president, Viktor Yanukovych. During a speech, he forgot how to say "Christmas tree" in Ukrainian (Ukrainian: ялинка, romanized: yalynka), and, after a long pause, said "yolka". "Yolka" is close to the pronunciation of the Russian word for Christmas tree (Russian: ёлка, romanized: yolka), but not quite. The word became a meme criticizing Yanukovych as a "Ukrainian president who doesn't know Ukrainian".

== Gaffe ==
In December 2010, Yanukovych tried to disperse protesters against his tax reform policies and used "preparing for Christmas" as the excuse to take down the tents put up. This was his speech during a news television interview:

Сьогодні в Києві вже встановлюється на тому місці, де вчора стояли палатки пікетувальників... Сьогодні вже встановлюється новорічна... [long pause] ... йолка, і люди почнуть дуже-дуже скоро святкувати Новий рік. Ми підтримуємо бажання киян жити в спокої, в стабільній ситуації, будемо все робити для того, щоб це відбувалось завжди, був гарний настрій.

Translation:

Today in Kyiv, they [referring to the Christmas trees] are already being put up, where there were picketers yesterday, today we are already setting up a... [long pause] ... yolka, and people will be celebrating Christmas Eve very soon. We wish you a life in a stable and peaceful environment, and we will do everything to ensure that you are feeling a good mood.

== Reactions ==
The clip of Yanukovych was widely spread on the internet, with netizens criticizing him as a Ukrainian president who doesn't speak Ukrainian. Yanukovych was made the subject of internet memes depicting him in various humorous situations with the "yolka".

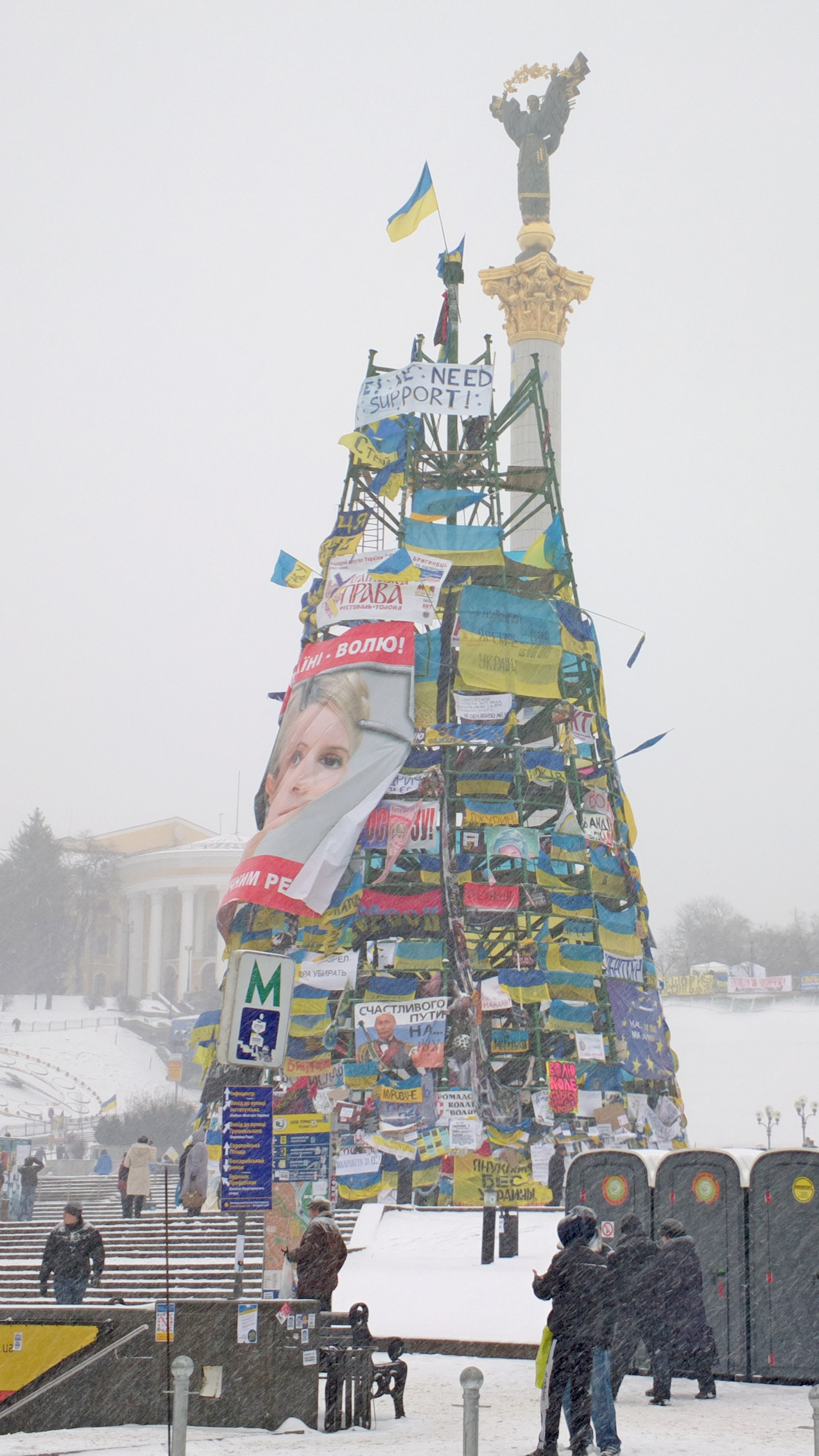
Christmas tree in the Independence Square in Kyiv, December 9, 2013. Also satirized as the "Yolka"

During the Euromaidan Protests in 2013–2014, the protesters prevented the Christmas tree from being completed in the Independence Square in Kyiv, and has since been satired as being the "Yolka". This tree has also been a symbol of the Revolution of Dignity, and was not taken down until August 2014.

== Linguistic analysis ==
Ukrainian linguist N. Trach said the creation of the term was linked to Yanukovych's own idiolect (Yanukisms) and Russian-influenced way of speaking (Russianisms), as well as surzhyk, a colloquial, habitual mixture of the Ukrainian and Russian languages by some Ukrainians.

Scholarly observers described the gaffe and reactions to it as transforming the semantics for a word meaning "Christmas tree" into that of signifying an insult to Yanukovych for not being able to speak Ukrainian, and said it was emblematic of systematic failures by post-Soviet governments to coherently communicate with their citizens and gain trust.

== Legacy ==
In 2016, Yanukovych's successor as president Petro Poroshenko made a similar gaffe, forgetting the Ukrainian word for "wallet" and turning to ask an aide what the proper word was. Ukrainian media made comparisons to the "yolka" incident.

== See also ==
- Azirivka, a mocking term for the broken Ukrainianisms of Mykola Azarov
- Bavovna, another Ukrainian meme arising from mistranslation
