= Yanukism =

Linguistic errors by Viktor Yanukovych

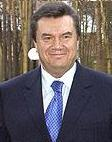
Viktor Yanukovych

Yanukisms (Ukrainian: янукізми, romanized: yanukizmy) is a Ukrainian colloquial term for various linguistic errors and mistakes made by former President Viktor Yanukovych, who was widely noted for frequent malapropisms and misspellings, which contrasted with the formal and educated image he projected in public.

One of the best-known examples of a Yanukism is the misspelling "proffesor" (Ukrainian: проффесор), which Yanukovych wrote on his registration form during the 2004 presidential election. He made 12 other mistakes while filling out the form, most notably misspelling the names of his wife and his hometown. The term "proffesor" became an internet meme and a nickname for Yanukovych. In light of these errors, members of the Ukrainian public and media began to question his doctorate in economics. The frequency of Yanukovych's mistakes has also led to suspicions that his best-selling books may have been ghostwritten.

Yanukisms may also involve factual mistakes rather than linguistic errors. Among other statements, Yanukovych has claimed that the Greek Mount Athos is located in Palestine, referred to the 2022 Winter Olympics as 'a World Championship' and stated that Israel is a European country.

== Examples ==
Yanukism	Explanation	Ref.
проффесор (proffesor)	extra ф (f)	
Welcome in Ukraine!	wrong preposition (to instead of in); Yanukovych said this while on a state visit to Japan in 2011	
Isaak Bebel	Yanukovych mixed up the Ukrainian author Isaac Babel and the German politician August Bebel.	
йолка (yolka)	meaning 'Christmas tree'. The Ukrainian term is ялинка (yalynka).	
прємьєр-міністр (premyer-ministr)	misspelling of прем'єр-міністр, meaning 'Prime Minister'; The incorrect spelling is derived from the Russian "Премьер-министр", substituting е and и with the Ukrainian letters є and і (which carry the same pronunciation in Ukrainian as е and и do in Russian — although е and и exist in the Ukrainian alphabet as well, they are pronounced differently).	
курасани (kurasany)	correct spelling: круасани (kruasany), meaning 'croissants'	
Secretary General Clinton	while meeting Hillary Clinton, Yanukovych mistitled her as 'Secretary General' instead of 'Secretary of State'	
"We will be blowing in all bells"	Promising to publicize the issues encountered by Zaporizhzhya Titanium-Magnesium Plant in 2009	
"...So that we don't remain without gas like a dog in the manger"	When commenting on his activities to provide Ukraine with gas supplies	
"We will strive for contraction of the political dialogue"	During a meeting with Russian president Vladimir Putin, Yanukovych confused the Russian word сохранение (preservation) with сокращение (contraction)	
"I took for myself a decision to give up my interests. And I will say, that I have always had one interest - for the country to be strong, and for the people to live in wealth."	Declared during a talk show	
"Zayev offered me to raise [the pensions] by 100%, but I told him - no, we must [raise them] twofold!.."	Spoken on air of Shuster Live	
"If we are speaking about agriculture, then we must at least not trade grain, but process it into meat..."	Expressing his views on economy	
"We recognize [...], that the territory of our country should be made unsafe for the life of our citizens..."	Spoken during a session of the National Security and Defence Council	
"[Medicine] is the branch that must come at the forefront, like smoke from a steam train"	Expressing his views on the medical system	
People from Lviv are "the country's best genocide"	Yanukovych mixed up the words for gene pool (генофонд, henofond) and genocide (геноцид, henotsyd)	
Anna Akhmetova	misspelling of Akhmatova	
"when you see with your own hands (– –) you touch it with your own eyes"	Yanukovych describes reports from regional governors	
"revival and development of Pridnestrovie and all of Ukraine"	Yanukovych confused the Ukrainian region of Dnipropetrovsk (Ukrainian: Дніпропетровська область, romanized: Dnipropetrovska oblast) with the unrecognized state of Transnistria (Ukrainian: Придністров'я, romanized: Prydnistrovia), which is a part of Moldova.	
"low-enriched Iran"	Yanukovych was meant to tell Barack Obama that a new research center in Kharkiv will focus on researching low-enriched uranium; he mixed up the words for "Iran" (Ukrainian: Іран, romanized: Iran) and "uranium" (Ukrainian: уран, romanized: uran).	
Astanavites! (Астанавітєсь!; Stop!)	Russianism; the proper Ukrainian term is Зупиніться! (Zupynit'sia!), another internet-meme associated with Yanukovich. Said in an address to the new Ukrainian government after the removal of Yanukovych from power in 2014.	
"I think that Ukraine is our strategic partner"	Freudian slip during a press conference in Rostov-on-Don following the flight of Yanukovych, who still claimed to be the legitimate president of Ukraine, to Russia	

== See also ==
- Azirivka
- Bushism
