= Hamlet, or the Phenomenon of Danish Katsapism =

Satirical play by Les Podervianskyi

- Original title: Гамлєт, або Феномен датського кацапізму
- Original language: Ukrainian (with extensive use of Surzhyk and profanity)
- Written by: Les Podervianskyi
- Based on: Hamlet by William Shakespeare
- Genre: Satirical play

Hamlet, or the Phenomenon of Danish Katsapism (Ukrainian: Ukrainian: Гамлєт, або Феномен датського кацапізму) is a satirical play by the Ukrainian writer Les Podervianskyi written in Ukrainian-Russian Surzhyk with extensive use of profanity. Created in the 1980s, it is a parody of Hamlet by William Shakespeare and a satire of Russian chauvinism.

== Plot ==
In the first act, Prince Hamlet, portrayed as a bearded man in simple clothes, meets the ghost of his father on the seashore. The ghost reveals that he was murdered by his brother Claudius. Contrary to the ghost's expectations, Hamlet refuses to take revenge, citing humanist principles, though he also displays xenophobic views. The dialogue between father and son turns into a conflict. Disappointed in Hamlet, the ghost "drowns himself in the sea", promising to return. Hamlet leaves to go drinking at a bar.

The second act takes place in a study, where Hamlet's mother Margarita, his uncle Claudius, and their servants are present. The ghost of Hamlet's father appears, seeking vengeance for his murder. A drunken Hamlet enters. The ghost instructs Hamlet to attack those who wronged him. Hamlet smashes everything around him and kills everyone present, including the ghost. In the finale, Sigmund Freud appears and takes Hamlet to a psychiatric hospital while sailors dance a tap routine to the song "Yablochko".

== Characters ==
- Prince Hamlet, the protagonist of the play, a "Danish katsap" ("katsap" is a derogatory term for Russians)
- Margarita, Hamlet's mother
- The Ghost of Hamlet's father, "a terrible wonder carefully covered with a sheet smeared in mud and gore"
- Claudius, the brother Hamlet's father, described as the prince's "lustful uncle"
- Sigmund Freud, psychiatrist

== Reception, scholarship, and adaptations ==
The play has been studied by Ukrainian scholars as an example of Sots Art in contemporary Ukrainian literature and as one example of how Shakespearean texts have been reworked by Ukrainian writers. It is often analyzed together with Podervianskyi's King Litre, another parody of a Shakespearean text.

The play has also been discussed as a satire of Russian chauvinism. As Daria Moskvitina notes, "another object of Podervianskyi's mockery is the so-called 'Russian national idea', encompassing religious, philosophical, and folk notions that promote the 'exceptionalism' of the Russian nation among others, as well as well-known Russian great-power chauvinism". For example, in the first act Hamlet declares himself a humanist while simultaneously saying that he hates "Jews, Tatars, Freemasons, Negroes, and Belarusians".

One of the best-known quotations from the play, which entered broader usage, is the opening of Hamlet's monologue, "To bathe, or not to bathe", a parody of Hamlet's "To be, or not to be" soliloquy in Shakespeare's play.

In 2021, the play was included in the list of the 30 best short stories of independent Ukraine, compiled by Radio NV with support from the Ukrainian Cultural Foundation for the 30th anniversary of Ukraine's independence.

In 2024, a rock opera adaptation titled Hamlet, based on Podervianskyi's play and composed by Viacheslav Nazarov, premiered in Kyiv.
