= Decree 374/2026 =

Zelenskyy decree allowing Moscow parade

- Long title: "About the parade in Moscow"
- Citation: Decree of the President of Ukraine nº 374/2026
- Signed by: Volodymyr Zelenskyy
- Signed: 8 May 2026
- Commenced: 8 May 2026
- Status: In force

The Decree of the President of Ukraine nº 374/2026 "About the Parade in Moscow" (in Ukrainian: Ука́з Президе́нта Украї́ни No. 374/2026 «Про прове́дення пара́ду в м. Москві́») is a decree signed by the President of Ukraine Volodymyr Zelenskyy on May 8, 2026. The Decree of the President of Ukraine introduced a temporary ceasefire by the defense forces of Ukraine in a clearly defined square in the center of Moscow to enable the holding of events for Victory Day in Russia on May 9 (when Europe Day is celebrated in Ukraine itself).

In the Ukrainian segment of the Internet, the decree provoked a massive wave of Internet memes and ironic publications, while in the Russian information space, such a step predictably caused irritation and indignation.

== Background ==
The Decree was issued against the backdrop of US President Donald Trump's announcement of a three-day ceasefire between Ukraine and Russia from May 9 to 11, 2026. During the same period, the Ukrainian side received the consent of the Russian Federation to conduct a large-scale exchange of prisoners of war in the "1000 for 1000" format.

According to the preamble to the Decree, the decision was made "for the humanitarian purpose outlined in the negotiations with the American side on May 8, 2026."

== Contents of the Decree ==
The decree consists of two paragraphs and contains the exact geographical coordinates of the zone that is temporarily excluded from the plan for the use of Ukrainian weapons. The silence regime began at 10:00 Kyiv time on May 9, 2026.

Taking into account numerous requests, for the humanitarian purpose outlined in the negotiations with the American side on May 8, 2026, I decide:

1. To allow a parade to be held in Moscow (Russian Federation) on May 9, 2026. For the duration of the parade (from 10 a.m. Kyiv time on May 9, 2026), the territorial square of Red Square shall be excluded from the plan for the use of Ukrainian weapons.
Red Square Square:

- 55.754413 37.617733
- 55.755205 37.619181
- 55.753351 37.622854
- 55.752504 37.621538

2. This Decree shall enter into force on the date of its signing.

President of Ukraine V. ZELENSKYI
May 8, 2026

=== Geographical limits of the Decree ===
The coordinates specified in the document form a strict rectangle, which, with an accuracy of one meter, covers exclusively the cobblestones of Red Square:

- 55.754413°N 37.617733°E — northern corner (State Historical Museum);
- 55.755205°N 37.619181°E — east corner (GUM);
- 55.753351°N 37.622854°E — southern corner (St. Basil's Cathedral);
- 55.752504°N 37.621538°E — western corner (Spasskaya Tower of the Moscow Kremlin).

The Decree did not apply to government buildings in the Kremlin itself, located outside the specified coordinates, as well as to military equipment that was on the approaches to the designated square before 10:00 AM.

== Implementation ==
As of May 9, 2026, the Ukrainian side has fully complied with its commitments. No strikes were carried out on the designated square of Red Square, which allowed the Russian side to carry out the planned activities at this specific location.

== Reactions ==
The determination of precise geospatial coordinates at the level of a presidential act indicates a high degree of control over Ukrainian strike systems. Legal analysts of the portal "LIGA.Zakon" indicate that the Decree made the security of the main military ritual of the Russian Federation dependent on the guarantees of Ukraine, which fixes a cardinal change in the balance of power in the armed conflict and the degradation of Russia's strategic depth.

Foreign observers, in particular the American publication The Counteroffensive, noted the unprecedentedness of the situation, calling it "high-level trolling", since the parade in Moscow required agreement with Kyiv through the mediation of the United States.

=== By country ===
- United States: The Decree was issued in connection with the US "peacemaking initiatives". On May 8, President Trump announced an agreement on a three-day ceasefire (May 9–11, 2026) between Ukraine and Russia and the preparation of a "1000 for 1000" prisoner exchange. Yuri Ushakov later confirmed that the extension of the ceasefire was the initiative of the US president.
- Russia: The Russian authorities reacted with irritation. On May 9, Kremlin spokesman Dmitry Peskov stated that Russia "independently determines the format of the celebrations" and does not require external permits.

At the same time, the Russian Defense Ministry had threatened the day before with massive missile strikes on Kyiv ("decision-making centers") in the event of attempts to disrupt the events in Moscow.

=== Public outcry ===
In the Ukrainian information space, the Presidential Decree caused a stormy reaction, instantly acquiring the status of an Internet meme. The publication of the exact coordinates (up to a meter), which defined the boundaries of the "safe square" around Red Square, was perceived as the highest level of state trolling and a successful psychological operation. Social media users actively distributed maps with the "Zelensky Square" marked, joking that "the Ukrainian Defense Forces, not the Russian air defense, acted as the guarantor of the security of the main Russian military ritual."

The reaction of Russians ranged from outright hysteria in “Z-publics” to a deep sense of "national humiliation." Russian users and "military corps" exploded with anger at the powerlessness of their own air defense and the Kremlin's silence, which many perceived as a de facto recognition of Kyiv's fire control over Moscow. The greatest fear was caused by the surgical precision of the coordinates specified in the decree: discussions on the Internet boiled down to panic calculations of how far away government buildings were from the "security square", which turned a traditional military ritual into a visual demonstration of Moscow's vulnerability.

== See also ==
- Day of Remembrance and Victory over Nazism in World War II 1939 – 1945
- Europe Day
- Bavovna
- Russo-Ukrainian war
