= Without you (post) =

Social media post by Volodymyr Zelenskyy

"Without you" (Ukrainian: Без вас, romanized: Bez vas) was a post made by Ukrainian President Volodymyr Zelenskyy on 11 September 2022 on social media during the Russo-Ukrainian war.

== Background ==
On February 24, 2022, in the ninth year of the Russo-Ukrainian war, Russia launched a full-scale invasion of Ukraine. During the first days of the invasion, Russia advanced a considerable distance into the territory of Ukraine in many directions, but the Armed Forces of Ukraine soon drove the Russian Armed Forces out of the north of the country and counterattacked in other directions.

On the 200th day of the invasion and on the sixth day of Ukraine's Kharkiv counteroffensive, which lasted from September 6 to 12, the Russians struck the Kharkiv Thermal Power Plant 5 and partially cut off power in several areas. The post was made in response to this attack.

== Text of the post ==
Below is an excerpt from the final part of the post, translated from Ukrainian:

Do you still think that we are "one people"?

Do you still think that you can scare us, break us, make us make concessions?

Did you really not understand anything?

Don't you understand who we are? What we are for? What we are talking about?

Read [my] lips:

Without gas or without you? Without you.

Without light or without you? Without you.

Without water or without you? Without you.

Without food or without you? Without you.

Cold, hunger, darkness and thirst are not as terrible and deadly for us as your "friendship and brotherhood".

But history will put everything in its place.

And we will be with gas, light, water and food ... and without you!

== Reactions ==
The post became one of the symbols of the determination of Ukrainian resistance to the Russian occupation. Immediately after its publication, an online flash mob began among Ukrainians, who made social media posts with the hashtag #БезВас.

US Atlantic Council analyst Peter Dickenson compared Zelenskyy's rhetoric in the post with Winston Churchill's, and journalist Serhiy Zvyglyanych drew analogies with the theses of Leonid Kuchma's "Ukraine is not Russia" and Petro Poroshenko's "Away from Moscow!"

On November 17, 2022, the phrase "without you" was used by the British ambassador to Ukraine, Melinda Simmons, when Kyiv was cut off by another attack. The photo she published showed a sprig of cotton (Bavovna), another symbol of the war. Journalists also began to use the phrase in materials with advice on how to successfully survive the winter in the conditions of frequent power outages and interruptions of other municipal services. The principle behind "without you" was applied by the media to Russia's exit from the grain agreement, and life in liberated Kherson was called the "best embodiment" of the principle. The phrase and a longer excerpt from the speech have featured on merchandise.

On November 23, 2022, after a massive missile attack on Ukraine's energy infrastructure, a large part of Moldova was without power. The blackout prompted Moldovans to join the "without you" flash mob.

== See also ==
- "I need ammunition, not a ride" – quote by Zelenskyy
- We shall fight on the beaches – speech by Churchill
- Gettysburg Address – speech by Abraham Lincoln
- Appeal of 18 June – speech by Charles de Gaulle
