= To bomb Voronezh =

Russian-language internet meme and idiom

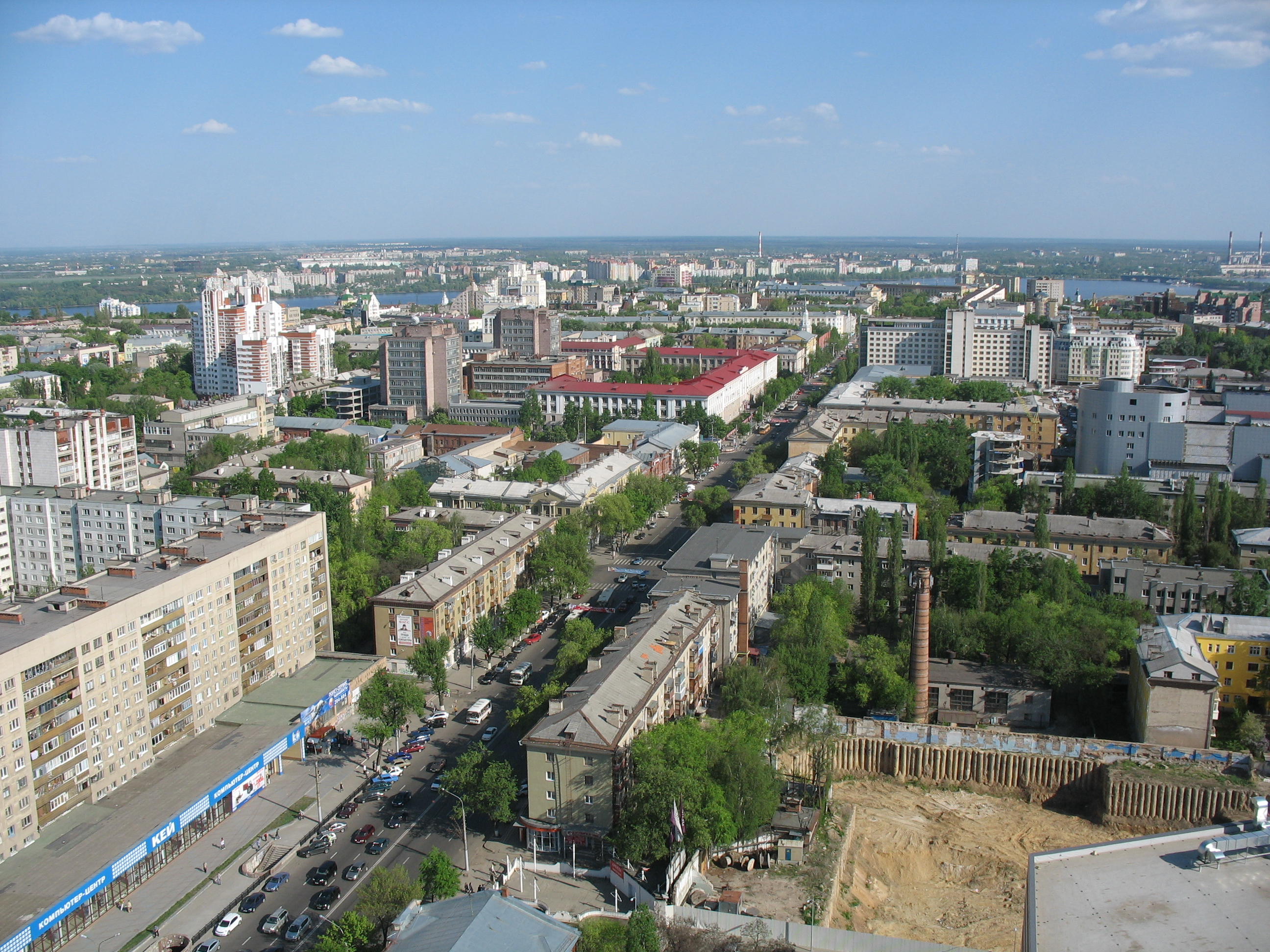
Voronezh, the 14th largest city in Russia

"To bomb Voronezh" (Note: Also translated as "bombing Voronezh".) (Russian: Бомбить Воронеж, romanized: Bombit' Voronezh) is a Russian-language internet meme and political idiom, referring to self-destructive actions by the Russian regime that harm the population, akin to the English "cutting off one's nose to spite one's face".

== History ==
Early iterations of the meme came in the aftermath of the Russo-Georgian War, when Russian authorities allocated large amounts of money to reconstruct destroyed cities of South Ossetia. An apocryphal anecdote states that a government official in the Russian city Voronezh complained sarcastically around this time:

The amount [of money] allocated for South Ossetia is three times more than what the entire Voronezh Oblast receives in three years. Better bomb Voronezh, that way we'll actually get normal roads.

According to Radio Free Europe/Radio Liberty, this story is probably a myth, since no records of the statement actually exist. In August 2008 a LiveJournal user referenced a similar joke supposedly made by "the residents of Voronezh", with no mention of a government official.

Starting in the mid-2010s, with the international sanctions on Russia and retaliatory Russian counter-sanctions, the meme had a change in meaning. In 2012, the Russian parliament passed the Dima Yakovlev Law, which prevented the adoption of Russian orphans by Americans. The main blow of the law fell on the Russian orphans themselves, many of whom suffered from serious illnesses. Similar exchanges of mutual sanctions occurred after Russia's annexation of Crimea, hurting ordinary Russian consumers. Thus, a common Russian joke was that "in response to the sanctions, the president gave the order to bomb Voronezh".

A joke spread on Runet about a supposed conversation between two Russian government officials:

[Sergey] Lavrov calls [Sergey] Shoigu and says: "Listen, Kuzhugetovich, don't bomb New York, my daughter lives there."

Shoigu responds indignantly: "Crap! [Dmitry] Peskov asked not to hit London or Paris, and [Dmitry] Medvedev said not to hit Berlin, [Yelena] Mizulina said not Belgium, [Vladimir] Zhirinovsky said not Switzerland... A lot of others called too, the list is long. Lavrov, where do we even hit?"

"Hmm... well, fuck it, [hit] Voronezh, no one we care about is there."

On 20 April 2023, during the Russian invasion of Ukraine the Russian Air Force accidentally bombed the Russian city of Belgorod, injuring three people. Anti-war Russians drew comparisons to the "bomb Voronezh" meme.

The meme was brought up again during the Wagner Group rebellion in June 2023, when there were reports of government shelling against the Wagner rebels causing an oil depot in Voronezh Oblast to catch fire.

== See also ==
- Bavovna
