= Cutting off one's nose to spite one's face =

Idiom about self-destructive behavior

"Cutting off one's nose to spite one's face" is an English-language idiom, used to describe an irrationally self-destructive act taken in pursuit of revenge. The phrase often takes the form of the proverb "Don't cut off your nose to spite your face".

An early record of this phrase appears in the 12th century writings of Peter of Blois, who referred to it as a "common saying" (Proverbium vulgare) and recorded it as: "He who cuts off his nose takes poor revenge for a shame inflicted on him." (Male ulciscitur dedecus sibi illatum, qui amputat nasum suum.)

== Modern use and examples ==
=== Popular culture ===
Taylor Swift's 2019 single, "The Archer", provides a straightforward example of the phrase:

"I cut off my nose just to spite my face / And I hate my reflection for years and years."

An invocation of the idiom that emphasises the everyday character of spite which is quickly regretted appears in Seamus Heaney's 1966 poem, "Gravities":

"Lovers with barrages of hot insult / Often cut off their nose to spite their face, / Endure a hopeless day, declare their guilt, / Re-enter the native port of their embrace."

=== Political and economic analysis ===
In modern times, the idiom is often used in political and economic commentary to describe actions by a political actor, party, corporation or nation that appear (at least to some) to damage the actor's own interests in pursuit of harming a perceived adversary.

Examples of events the phrase has been used to describe include the tariff policies of the second Trump administration, the willingness of British Airways to allow the 2019 pilots' strike to run on instead of settling quickly, incurring greater costs to the business as a result, and Theresa May's plans during her second ministry to withdraw the UK from the European Atomic Energy Community. Because the idiom is necessarily used to admonish conduct or warn against a course of action, it is unlikely to be used in neutral reporting, and whether any given action properly meets the standard of irrational self-destruction is a matter of debate.

== History ==
=== Peter of Blois (12th century) ===
The earliest known record of the phrase appears in Peter of Blois's letter, "On the Pilgrimage to Jerusalem" (De Hierosolymitana Peregrinatione). Writing in Medieval Latin, he pleads with God not to punish Christian believers so harshly that he diminishes his own greatness in the eyes of nonbelievers:

"We know that you are offended by our sins. But I beg you, do not turn your offence into reproach for your name ... There's a common saying: 'He who cuts off his own nose takes poor revenge for a shame inflicted upon him.'"

Nose-cutting was a known punishment for treachery and adultery during the Middle Ages, with the explicit purpose of permanently turning the victim's face into a sign of their lack of honour.

=== Æbbe the Younger (13th century) ===
The legend of Saint Æbbe the Younger is sometimes suggested as the origin of the phrase, though its theme and historical origin do not align with the idiom's meaning or origin. In the legend, first recorded by Matthew Paris in the 13th century, Æbbe and her nuns are said to have protected their virginity from Viking raiders by cutting off their noses:

"that abbess of admirable courage, openly giving to all the sisters an example of chastity which should be profitable not only to those nuns, but which should be worthy of being followed by all succeeding virgins, and by all who should at any time exist, took a razor, and cut off her nose, and her upper lip close to the very teeth, and so made herself a shocking sight to all the bystander."

However, Paris frames this act as one of piety, not of irrational self-destruction. In addition, this legend first appears several decades after Peter of Blois's own 12th century writings, by which time he was already able to refer to the idiom as a common saying.

=== Francis Grose (18th century) ===
In the 1788 edition of Francis Grose's Classical Dictionary of the Vulgar Tongue, "He cut off his nose to be revenged of his face" is said to apply to "one who, to be revenged on his neighbor, has materially injured himself."

== See also ==
- Crab mentality
- Owning the libs
- Rhinotomy
- To bomb Voronezh, an analogous Russian language idiom
- Ultimatum game
