= Les Podervianskyi =

- Лесь Подерв'янський
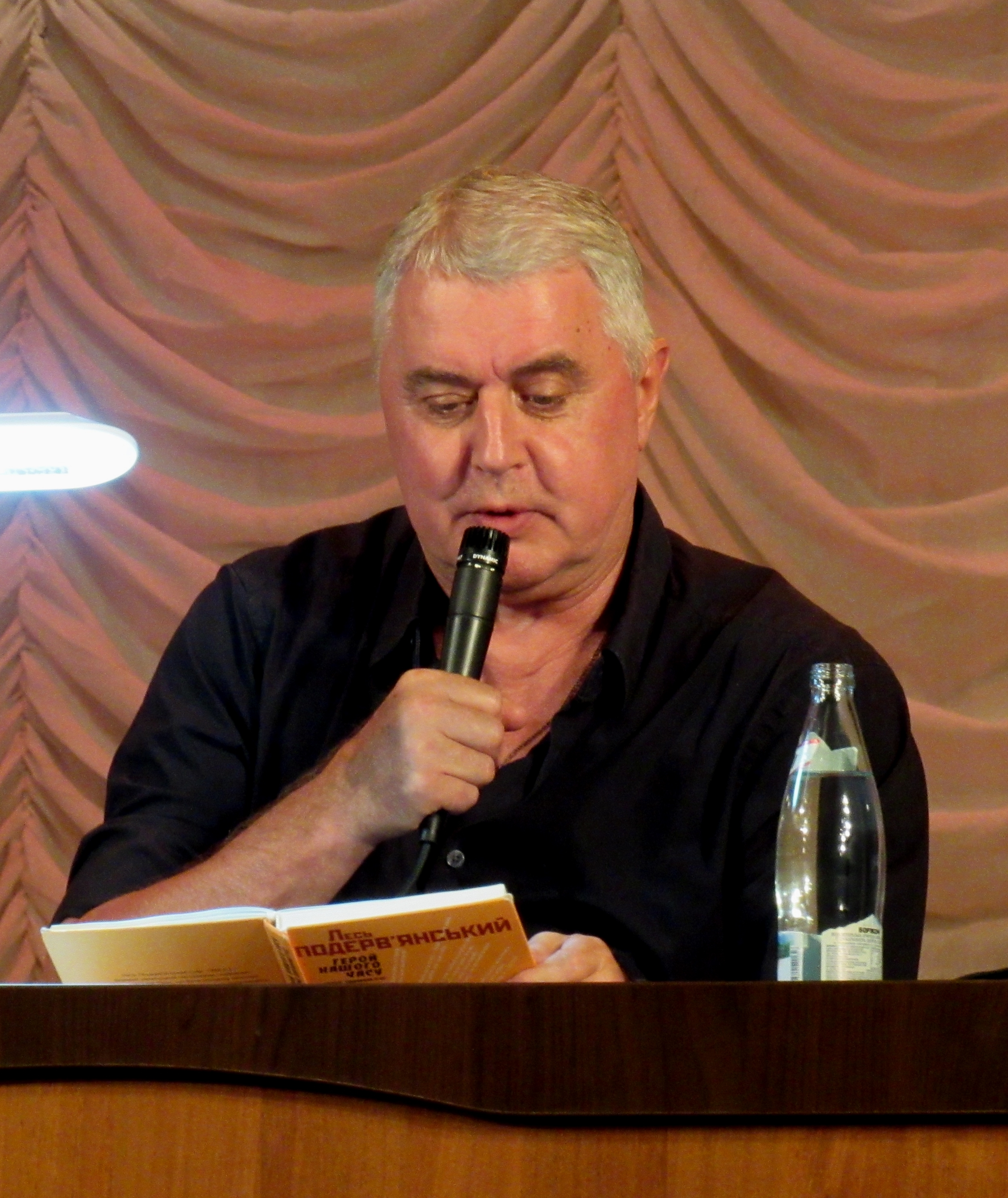
- Podervianskyi in Mariupol in 2019
- Born: Oleksandr Serhiiovych Podervianskyi; November 3, 1952 (age 73); Kyiv, Ukrainian SSR, Soviet Union
- Education: National Academy of Visual Arts and Architecture
- Known for: Literature, painting

Oleksandr "Les" Serhiiovych Podervianskyi (Ukrainian: Олекса́ндр «Лесь» Сергі́йович Подерв'я́нський, IPA: [ˈlɛsʲ poderˈwjɑnʲsʲkɪj]; born November 3, 1952) is a Ukrainian painter, poet, playwright and performer. He is most famous for his absurd, highly satirical, and at times obscene short plays. Their average duration is five to fifteen minutes, with some exceptions. Podervianskyi has a cult following among Kyiv intellectuals.

== Cultural background ==
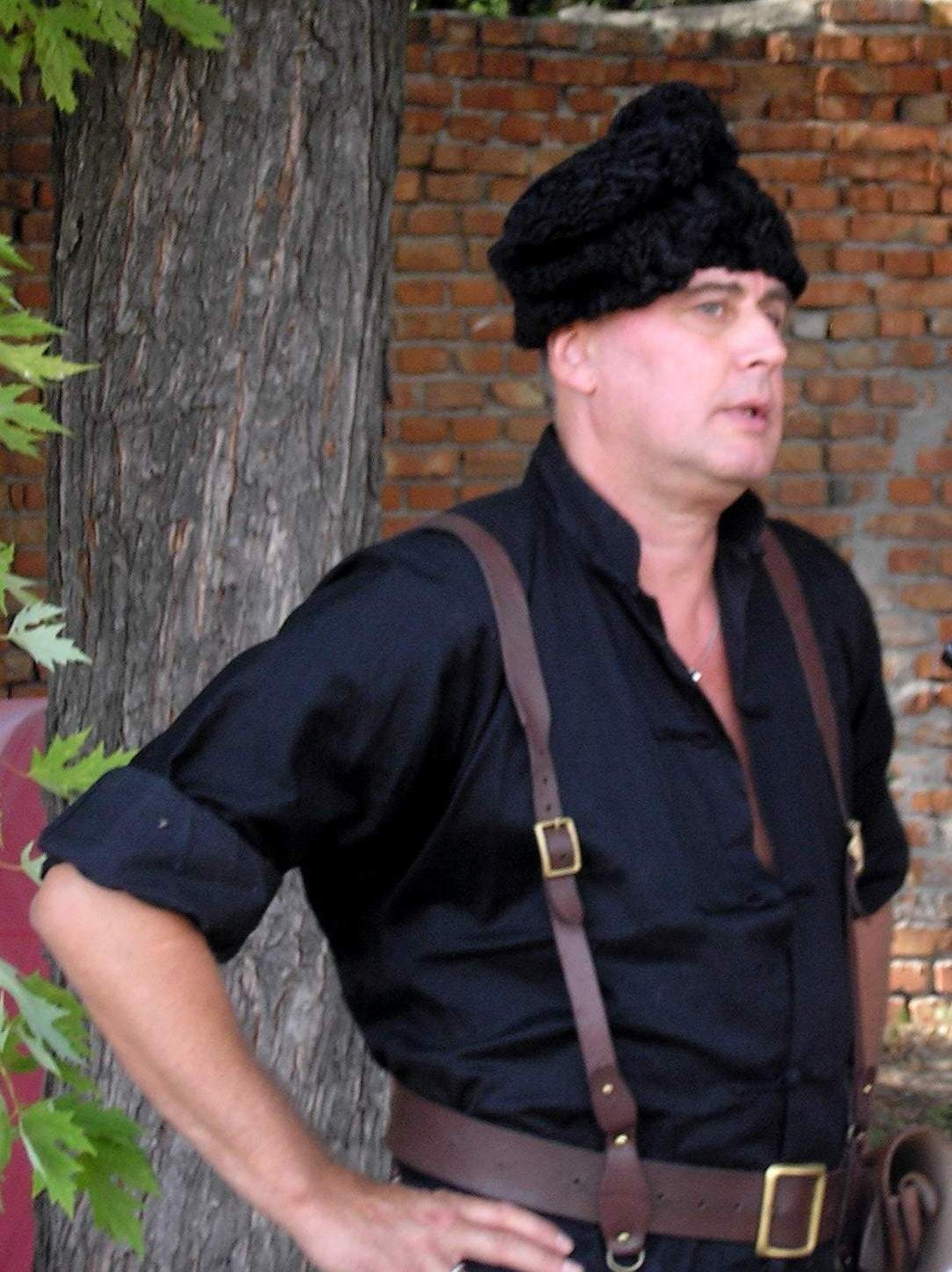
Les Podervianskyi in anarchist suit at an underground art festival in Huliaipole. 24 August 2006.

His mother was the art historian Lyudmyla Milyayeva. In 1968, he graduated from the Republican Art School in Kyiv.

In 1976, he graduated from the Kyiv Art Institute (specialty: easel and monumental painting, graphics, theatrical painting).

Podervianskyi wrote most of his works in the Soviet Union in the mid to late 1980s, the so-called Era of Stagnation in politics and social life—the era of "zastoy" and the time of rapid changes in consciousness. He observed the people in that situation, their reactions and behaviour. And most thoroughly he watched the speech patterns of outsiders and commoners, people from the country. The author places common people in grotesque absurd situations and shows how they would act and speak much the same regardless of what happens.

Podervianskyi's works are highly regarded owing to his attention to detail. Many behavioural modes are easily recognizable, and people are able to recognize themselves in the plays. The general absurdity of the situation makes the characters' absurd actions more acceptable, and although certain phrases the author uses are politically incorrect, his humour is generally neutral.

Podervianskyi says he draws a lot of his inspiration from the years of his army service. There is also an opinion that his plays are in some way inspired by works of Samuel Beckett. This writer was favorite also for his friend artist Nicholas Zalevsky.

Member of the Union of Artists of Ukraine since 1980.

== Language ==
Podervianskyi's works have often been criticized because of his use of vulgar unprintable language. They are written mostly in Surzhyk and include much swearing and obscenities, which make them appear as if they were composed by an uneducated person. Often it seems that the only reason one would read the works is for their comic impact and to hear creative swearing. But this is not the case. The numerous citations from Shakespeare, Nietzsche, Taoism and dzen buddhism philosophers give the idea of several intellectual layers in his works. Although a number of Podervianskyi's expressions have entered Ukrainian slang, he uses crude language to show the flaws and grotesqueness of his characters. Podervianskyi carefully matches up language with his characters. Thus a self-made intellectual spouts scientific-sounding nonsense, while more "straightforward" characters use simple words to express complex things.

Because Podervianskyi's works are known primarily in the form of audio recordings of the author's recitals, his voice adds extra dramatic effect to the text.

== Works ==
- Tainstviennyi Ambal – Таінствєнний амбал
- Hamlet – Гамлєт, або феномен датського кацапізму
- Pavlik Morozov – Павлік Морозов
- Pizdets – Піздєц
- Khuinia – Хуйня
- Katsapy – Кацапи
- Danko – Данко
- Tsikavi Doslidy – Цікаві досліди
- Patsavata Istoriia – Пацавата історія
- Heroi Nashoho Chasu – Герой нашого часу
- Vasilisa Yehorovna i Muzhychki – Васіліса Єгоровна і мужичкі
- Mistse vstriechi izmienit nizzia, bliad – Місце встрєчі ізмєніть ніззя, блядь
- Ostanovis mhnovienie ty prekasno – Остановісь мгновєніє ти прєкрсно
- Utopia – Утопія
- Snoby – Сноби
- Khvoroba Ivasyka – Хвороба Івасика
- Korol Litr – Король Літр
- Nirvana, abo Alzo Shprekh Zaratustra – Нірвана, або Альзо Шпрех Заратустра
- Yohy – Йоги
- Svoboda – Свобода
- Kazka pro riepku abo khuli ne yasno – Казка про рєпку або хулі нє ясно
- Vostok – Восток
- Do khuia masla – Дохуя масла
- Piat khvylyn na rozdumy – П'ять хвилин на роздуми
- Yoko ta samuraii – Йоко та самураї
- Rukh zhyttia abo Dynamo – Рух життя або Динамо
- Zhan Mare ta yoho druzi – Жан Маре та його друзі
- Dokhtory – Дохтори
- Kamianyi Dovboiob – Кам'яний довбойоб
- Irzhyk – Іржик
- Den kolhospnyka – День колгоспника
- Mnozhennia v umi, abo plynnist chasu – Множення в умі, або плинність часу
- Triasovyi Period – Тріасовий період
- Diana – Діана
- Bliesk i nishchieta pidarasiv – Блєск і ніщєта підарасів

== Major works ==
=== Hamlet ===
Podervianskyi's Hamlet is a short, satiric retelling of Hamlet by William Shakespeare, set in an imaginary Denmark that closely resembles the Soviet Union of the 1980s. A bored and indifferent hero doesn't care about religion, revenge, truth, or politics; all he wants is to get drunk. Eventually he kills everyone, including his father, and he is taken to an asylum by a famous psychiatrist Sigmund Freud.

=== Pavlik Morozov ===
A longer (one-hour) play set in the Siberian taiga, where a group of members of the Soviet youth Pioneer Movement is led by a Communist official in search of God in order to prove (by not finding God) that God does not exist. Things rapidly change when God's messenger Mykola Ostrovsky (a reference to Soviet writer Nikolai Ostrovsky), is found in the process. The result of rapid change from atheism to paganism is minimal in terms of human behaviour. The name of the play refers to pioneer Pavlik Morozov, a young Soviet communist "martyr".

=== Pizdets ===
(Devoted to artists unions)

A group of passive art-men live in a freight car, eat state-supplied noodles every day, and do absolutely nothing except pseudo-intellectual chat. They are completely happy inside because they are guaranteed their supply of noodles. They are too scared to leave the car for fear of losing their daily meal. On the contrary, local passers-by (non-art-men) are extremely intrigued by what is happening inside, and seek whatever ways to get into the community. In the end, car brakes are removed, it rolls and crashes offscene.

=== Katsapy ===
Four Russian tourists enjoy the seaside in mid-level resort city (possibly Feodosiya), speaking with heavy Moscovite pronunciation (known as akanye). Four Ukrainian natives are approaching the city by train, speaking in Surzhyk and discussing various things, events and nations with equal enmity. As train arrives to the destination in the last act, the Ukrainians meet Russians and proceed to attack them.

As said at, the train described was the suburban one heading from Vladislavovka back to Feodosiya. Katsaps were pictured being in Novyi Svit (everything of that is in Crimea).

Katsapy (sing. Katsap) is a Ukrainian ethnic slur for Russians, particularly those residing in Ukraine.

=== Danko ===
This play is one of the shortest and at the same time one of the most often referred to and cited in unofficial communication and in public critical literature and media discourse. Its plot is a parody of a classical play by a Soviet writer Maksim Gorky, an idyllic myth of totalitarian Communist ideology. In Gorky's play a hero named Danko leads poor people to the light and happiness through hardships and darkness, burns his own heart to show them the way and dies after this self-sacrifice. Les Podervianskyi's Danko is a rather strange and pathetic fellow, he is also leading a mob of people somewhere but he does not know the way and as he is afraid that people would be angry with his poor directions he burns his heart first, then his liver and finally his kidneys. He dies without any sense and is forgotten by the mob at once.
