= Reconstruction efforts after the Russo-Georgian War =

The Russo-Georgian War caused major infrastructural and economic damage throughout Georgian and South Ossetian territory. Many countries promised reconstruction aid to the affected regions.

== Georgia ==
On 19 August 2008, Armenia and Azerbaijan sent construction materials and specialists to Georgia to help in the reconstruction of the railway bridge in Kaspi Municipality blown up on 16 August 2008.

Georgia's war damage was assessed to be $3 billion by the international commission. A donors' conference for Georgia was scheduled to be held on October 22. On 20 October 2008, on the sidelines of an international high level conference in Belgium on "The Future of Parliamentary Involvement in Global Health and Development", the humanitarian situation in Georgia was also discussed. On 22 October 2008, the United States pledged $1 billion economic support package at a EU-organised donors’ conference in Brussels; this came after earlier aid of nearly $40 million in emergency humanitarian assistance. The European Commission added another €500 million. Many nations did not disclose their actual pledges. According to diplomats, Germany had promised additional €33.7 million in addition to their pre-war promise of €35 million. Sweden offered €40 million. France promised €7 million. Japanese offer of $200 million in infrastructure recovery aid over three years included the condition of Georgia's continuation of democratic and economic reforms. The International Monetary Fund pledged a $750 million credit. The European Investment Bank pledged €200 million reconstruction credit. Estonia pledged €1 million.

In total, the Brussels conference agreed to provide $4.55 billion for Georgia from 67 entities. The amount far exceeded the $3.25 billion estimate of the World Bank and United Nations. Of the total, $2 billion would be awarded as a gift and most of the money would be put into the private sector.

Georgian Prime Minister Lado Gurgenidze said, "We are deeply moved and humbled by the demonstration of solidarity and support that we have received." He observed the pledges were issued despite the 2008 financial crisis. He then added that "Every single, euro, dollar and pound will make Georgia stronger, more prosperous, freer, more democratic and more genuinely and thoroughly European." Joint summit host, EU External Affairs Commissioner Benita Ferrero-Waldner, said of the occasion and its outcome, "This is a day of joy." The pledge came after growth forecasts for Georgia's economy were reduced from 9 percent to 3.5 percent with 127,000 newly displaced people resulting from the conflict.

The World Bank official suggested in early December 2008 that if the donors' conference had been held later than October 2008, there was no guarantee that Georgia would have received any aid. Georgia was spared from the 2008 financial crisis as a result of the financial aid.

== South Ossetia ==
=== August-October 2008 ===
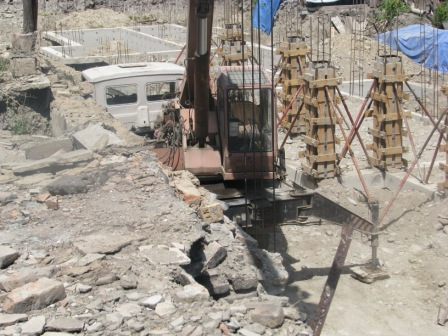
Reconstruction in Tskhinvali after the war

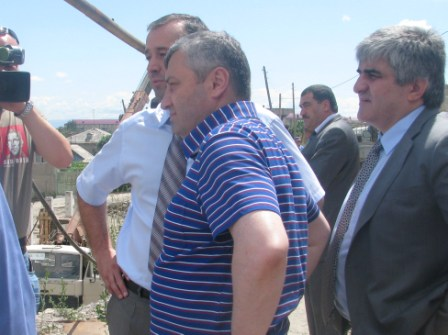
President Eduard Kokoity inspecting reconstruction work in August, 2009

On 9 August 2008, Prime Minister of Russia Vladimir Putin announced in Vladikavkaz that the Government of Russia would allocate 10 billion Russian rubles (up to US$500 million) for the reconstruction of Tskhinvali. On 12 August 2008, the Government of Moscow announced they were planning to spend 2.5 billion rubles for the construction of Moskovsky mikrorayon (Moscow's micro-district) in South Ossetia, which would house up to 4 thousand residents. The Russian Ministry of Emergency Situations announced on 29 August 2008 that all 6 schools in Tskhinvali had been restored and new school year would begin on 1 September 2008.

In September 2008, hundreds of workers for the reconstruction of Tskhinvali were deployed by Russia. Prime Minister of South Ossetia Boris Chochiev said that Russia "promised to pay South Ossetians up to $2,000 each in compensation for war damage." In September 2008, Russia financed payment of pensions for South Ossetian pensioners, financed aid for unemployed and subsidised families that lost their houses during the war.

On 2 October 2008, Mayor of Moscow Yury Luzhkov arrived in Tskhinvali and launched the construction of the cottage town in the place of the former Georgian village of Tamarasheni. Luzhkov and President of South Ossetia Eduard Kokoity discussed the building of a railway between Tskhinvali and Russia. Luzhkov also visited the site of the future Russian military base near Tskhinvali. South Ossetia still had no government after Kokoity had fired the previous government about a month ago; it was suggested that Moscow wanted to appoint its own people for controlling the spending of Russian financial aid, but Kokoity was disagreeing with this.

=== December 2008 ===
On 1 December 2008, Novaya Gazeta reported that South Ossetian activists had found out that the real number of the housing losses were barely half of the number given by South Ossetian authorities. In early December 2008, Eduard Kokoity said that there were irregularities in the reconstruction process, such as the artificially ballooned prices and fraud by construction contractors. Eduard Kokoity fired South Ossetia's Finance Minister Alexey Panteleyev, who had previously served as the Finance Minister of Ulyanovsk Oblast in Russia. It was suggested the reason was Panteleyev's disagreement with Kokoity's management of financial aid from Russia.

It was reported that several South Ossetian ministers had demanded from the Russian Ministry of Regional Development to transfer Russian finances directly to the Government of South Ossetia back in October, but this request was rejected. One anonymous South Ossetian high-ranking official was quoted as saying that it was good that money wasn't given directly to Kokoity's clique because it would be stolen. First Vice-Premier of South Ossetia Hassan Pliev said in early December 2008 that the restoration of Tskhinvali would take 3 years and South Ossetia would become "one of the best regions of European Russia". Residents of Tskhinvali were satisfied by the work done by the Chechen and Russian builders. Former Prime Minister of South Ossetia Yury Morozov told Kommersant that large amounts of post-war financial aid for South Ossetia had "disappeared", while former Secretary of the South Ossetian Security Council Anatoly Barankevich stated that the construction materials (cement and glass) were stolen.

The contractors were surprised by Kokoity's allegations of inflated prices. Russian Emergencies Minister Sergey Shoigu was ordered by President of Russia Dmitry Medvedev to help to fix "the state mechanism" of South Ossetia against the backdrop of this scandal. Eduard Kokoity announced his intention to rename the street of Stalin in Tskhinvali into the street of Dmitry Medvedev. In late December 2008, Kokoity accused the Russian newspaper Kommersant of publishing falsehoods about him.

On 19 December 2008, Accounts Chamber of Russia reviewed the spending of 2 billion ruble aid granted to South Ossetia by Russia. The Chamber established that South Ossetia had only received 550 million rubles and had actually used 50 million rubles. The reconstruction work had been finished on only 8 objects out of 111. Other irregularities were also found. Accounts Chamber of Russia proposed the establishment of the Federal Directorate for the Restoration of South Ossetia to oversee the management of the financial aid.

=== 2009 ===
On 3 March 2009, Kommersant reported that the reconstruction works had been paused in Tskhinvali and a large part of Russian financial aid had not yet arrived in South Ossetia due to dispute between South Ossetian and Russian authorities on the control mechanism of spending. Russia would allocate remaining 8.5 billion rubles to South Ossetia for the reconstruction only after South Ossetia would agree to the Russian monitoring of spending. On 4 March 2009, Eduard Kokoity said that the rebuilding of Tskhinvali would take 5-10 years and South Ossetia could not complete reconstruction without Russia. On 13 March 2009, the head of the South Ossetian State Committee for the Implementation of Reconstruction Projects announced that all construction works in South Ossetia were halted due to the lack of funds and the work could not be restarted until September if the Russian funding did not arrive soon. South Ossetian Finance Minister Inal Pukhaev said that South Ossetia had completely spent 1.5 billion Russian rubles received in 2008 on the reconstruction. However, there were complaints of poor quality, such as leaking roofs. On 16 March 2009, Kommersant newspaper reported that the meeting of the commission on financing of South Ossetia of the Russian Ministry of Regional Development was postponed for the fourth time. The reporter stated that South Ossetia looked almost the same as during the war 7 months before. There was no heating in many houses in Tskhinvali. There never had been any reconstruction work in the villages at all. The Russian Finance Ministry allocated 2.8 billion rubles from the Federal budget of Russia to South Ossetia on 17 March 2009.

On 30 April 2009, Sergei Stepashin, the head of the Accounts Chamber of Russia, visited Tskhinvali and proposed publishing information on the spending of funds received for the restoration of Tskhinvali. In May 2009, the South Ossetian opposition accused President Kokoity of being a Tyrant and failing the reconstruction of South Ossetia.

Vadim Brovtsev was appointed as Prime Minister of South Ossetia in August 2009 to control the spending of Russian financial aid for the reconstruction. Kommersant reported that Tskhinvali looked almost the same on the anniversary of the war as 1 year before and no construction had been finished. The office of one of contractors had been robbed several days before and the victims were advised by the South Ossetian police to forget about money and leave South Ossetia altogether. Several Tskhinvali residents were quoted as saying that the visit of President Medvedev in July 2009 had jumpstarted the construction process and the foundations for the buildings were built in 3 weeks. Head physician of the Tskhinvali City hospital told Alexander Kots (journalist) that the recent visit of the Russian-appointed new Prime Minister was the first time in an year that a government official had visited the hospital and this gave him hope that the hospital would be reconstructed.

The Ministry of Foreign Affairs of Georgia issued a statement in late August 2009, which condemned the construction of new Tskhinvali district named Moskovsky mikrorayon (Moscow's micro-district) in the place of the former Georgian village of Tamarasheni and pointed out that even Nazis had not built new settlements named after Berlin in the place of the razed settlements of Lidice, Khatyn and Oradour-sur-Glane. Mayor of Moscow Yury Luzhkov visited Tskhinvali on 31 August 2009 and inaugurated the first school in the new Moscow's micro-district of Tskhinvali together with the South Ossetian government.

On 30 September 2009, 150 Tskhinvali residents held an unsanctioned rally demanding the reconstruction of their damaged residential houses. On 1 October 2009, South Ossetian residents sent a letter to Medvedev and Putin. They complained about the slow pace of the reconstruction and embezzlement of Russian financial aid. Kommersant reported in December 2009 that only 100 buildings out of 3500 damaged had been restored in South Ossetia and the Russian money had run out. Russia was no longer going to grant new financial aid for the reconstruction.

=== 2010-2013 ===
In August 2010, Eduard Kokoity accused "pro-Georgian forces" in Moscow for sabotaging the reconstruction of South Ossetia. In October 2010, Prime Minister of South Ossetia Vadim Brovtsev inspected the construction sites. He was disappointed by the slow pace of the construction of the municipal housing. Kommersant reported in March 2011 that although the Russian and South Ossetian authorities had claimed that South Ossetia's reconstruction was finished, not all damaged houses had been repaired and many victims living in poor conditions were dying in wait for the houses.

In October 2011, Russian journalist Arkady Babchenko reported that one of the reasons behind a sharp fall in the approval rating of President Eduard Kokoity was the disappearance of Russian aid money.

In 2013, the Office of the Prosecutor-General of Russia opened 60 criminal cases of embezzlement of billions of rubles in South Ossetia.

=== Pipeline ===
The Dzuarikau–Tskhinvali gas pipeline from North Ossetia to Tskhinvali began operation on 26 August 2009. The new pipeline was reported to have cost 15 billion rubles (US$476 million) and was under construction since December 2006. Before the construction, South Ossetia was supplied by gas from Georgia proper through the Agara-Tskhinvali branch of the Tbilisi-Kutaisi trunk system. Dzuarikau-Tskhinvali gas pipeline is among the highest-altitude pipelines in the world.

=== In popular culture ===
In Russia, the aid - and the perceived lack of similar attention given to cities in Russia - inspired the meme and idiom "to bomb Voronezh", with Russians sarcastically suggesting that their cities be bombed as well so their regions could receive as much money as South Ossetia.
