= Azirivka =

Broken Ukrainian of Mykola Azarov

Azirivka (Ukrainian: Азірівка) or Azirovka (Ukrainian: Азіровка) is a derisive name for the broken Ukrainian of the former Ukrainian prime minister Mykola Azarov. The term is produced by the corruption of his surname in an exaggerated way according to the "rules" of Azirivka. The term was later applied to the speech of other Ukrainian politicians with poor command of Ukrainian. It should be distinguished from surzhyk, which is an arbitrary colloquial mix of several languages, akin to pidgin, most commonly Ukrainian and Russian, widespread in Ukraine.

== Background ==
According to the 1989 Law of the Languages Ukrainian was declared the only official language in the country, and state officials were encouraged to speak Ukrainian in public. Many of them were Russian-speaking and struggled with Ukrainian in their speech, and they were often publicly derided. Among them of note are Viktor Yanukovych (see Yanukism) and Mykola Azarov.

Azarov speaks Ukrainian poorly. Nevertheless, he assured his constituents in early March 2010 that his government would be speaking Ukrainian.

== Characteristics ==
The main features of Azirivka is liberal replacement of vowels o, e, y, with 'i' (Note: Azarov's liberal substitution with vowel 'i' comes from two sources. The first one is the phonetic shift o→i in many Ukrainian words (кот→кіт, он мог→він міг) known as ikavism The second one is the confusion about the letter и, which corresponds to different phonemes in Russian and Ukrainian; the Ukrainian distinction of sounds і/и roughly matches the Russian distinction и/ы. In the most famous Azirovism кровососи→кровосiсi the first 'i' comes from the "hypercorrection" based on the first source, and the second 'i' comes from the second one.) and "akanye", replacement of the phonemes /o/ with [a], typical of Russian speech. (The term "Azirivka" was produced by applying the first "rule".) Often this produced a hilarious effect, the most notable "Azirovism" being krovosisi (кровосісі), or kravasisi (кравасісі) with akanye, for "bloodsuckers". It is a result of Azarov's hapless attempt to "Ukrainize" the Russian word "krovososy". Quote: "…в країні сфармувался целий прашарак кравасісєф бюджетних коштів" [A whole layer of budget bloodsuckers has formed in the country]. The comedy effect comes from the word "sisi", which is a baby talk for "tits" in Russian, i.e., it may be heard as "bloody tits". The correct Ukrainian word is кровососи (krovososy).

Azarov's son, Oleksiy Azarov, also a politician, said that unless the term is used with the purpose of insulting, it should be treated indifferently and even with humor. Azarov himself treated this light-heartedly.

== In culture ==
Deputy of the Rada Oleh Liashko called for the resignation of Azarov by reading a text from a paper written in Azirivka, however his microphone was quickly turned off.

Azirivka has become an element of humor during Euromaidan, when the words were coined, such as biikit for "boycott" or bimba for "bomb", and there was even an insult directed at Azarov: "Азірів іді на хій!" ("Aziriv, idi na khij!"), which could be compared to: "Aziriv, go to hill!", although the Ukrainian original is much more insulting, comparable to "Putin khuilo". Many of "azirivisms", real or invented, are funny due to sexual innuendos: вагiн, госпідар, мінет, піздно/папізже/опіздав.

An example of a joke capitalizing on Azirovisms: "Альо, міліція? У вагіні бімба!" – "Микола Янович, це ви?" – "Ні, ці анінім" ("Alio, militsiia? U vahini bimba!" – "Mykola Yanovych, tse vy?" – "Ni, tsi aninim"). ("Hellio, police? There is a bimb in the vagin!" - Mykola Yanovych, is that you"? - "Ni, it is aninym!")

In the Ukrainian satirical animated series Fairytale Rus by Kvartal 95 Studio chancellor Azirov at the court of Tsar Viktor II (a hint to Viktor Yanukovych) speaks in an "ancient Rusian language" (на "древнеруськом"), a humorous mixture of Russian and Ukrainian resembling Azirivka.
