= Bavovna =

Ukrainian word and internet meme

Bavovna (Ukrainian: бавовна, pronounced [bɐˈwɔu̯nɐ], lit. 'cotton') is a Ukrainian word and internet meme that originated during the Russian invasion of Ukraine, humorously used to refer to explosions, both those in Russian-occupied Ukraine and those in Russia itself.

== Origin ==
Starting in the 2010s, the Russian government began instructing the Russian mass media to refer to any explosion (primarily gas explosions) by the euphemism khlopok (Russian: хлопо́к, pronounced [xɫɐˈpok]), which literally means a "pop", or a "snap". In most writing, this word is spelled as a Russian word for cotton, khlopok (Russian: хло́пок, pronounced [ˈxɫopək]), but pronounced with stress on a different syllable. The two are differentiated in written form via context.

On 25 April 2022, during the Russian invasion of Ukraine, explosions rang out at a military base and an oil depot in the Russian city of Bryansk. As per the Russian government standards, Russian media reported the explosion as a khlopok, a "pop". However, when the announcement was translated into the Ukrainian language, the machine translation program confused the identically written words for "pop" and "cotton", and translated khlopok into Ukrainian as bavovna (Ukrainian: бавовна), a word which unambiguously means "cotton".

Later, Ukrainian Twitter users would begin to mockingly refer to future explosions as "bavovna", mocking both the censorship of Russian media as well as the perceived lack of knowledge of the Ukrainian language among Russians that led to the mistranslations. It has continued to be used in Ukrainian-language internet circles to refer to explosions on occupied territories of Ukraine far from the frontline, and also on Russian territory itself. It has also been used by official government and military figures in Ukraine. A Russian-language direct loan of the word, written the same but pronounced [bɐˈvovnə], is also used by some Russian-speaking Ukrainians with the same meaning.

== In popular culture ==
In summer 2022, a Kyiv-based punk rock group was formed named "100% Bavovna", who perform songs related to the Russo-Ukrainian War. They have performed with Tin Sontsia. Songs have also been recorded titled "Bavovna" by the bands GrozovSka Band and Jalsomino.

After a blackout in Kyiv induced by Russian attacks on Ukrainian infrastructure, British ambassador to Ukraine Melinda Simmons published a photo on social media of a sprig of cotton, and the caption "Without you", interpreted by Ukrainian media as a reference to the "bavovna" meme as well as to Volodymyr Zelenskyy's speech "Without you."

== See also ==
- Bayraktar (song)
- 2022 Chornobaivka attacks
- Russian warship, go fuck yourself
- To bomb Voronezh
- Yolka (gaffe)
