= Russianism =

Influence of the Russian language on other languages

Russianism or Russicism is an element of the Russian language that has been loaned into an another language, primarily in the form of loanwords, but also with regards to grammar.

In English, the overall number of Russianisms is small; they start appearing in 16th century (boyar, tsar, rouble), with a substantial increase in 19th and 20th century, especially in the field of political vocabulary (kulak, pogrom, Bolshevik, Soviet, samizdat). In Italian language Russianisms rank sixth in frequency after Anglicisms, Gallicisms, Germanisms, Hispanisms, and Arabisms.

== Russianisms and Russification ==
Russianisms are common in countries that have long been under the dominance of the Russian Empire and the Soviet Union and subject to Russification. They are especially frequent in Ukrainian and Belarusian, as the languages are linguistically close to Russian.

Examples of Russianisms in Ukrainian would be "часи" (časy, "clock") instead of "годинник" (hodynnyk), "ковьор" (kov'or "carpet") instead of "килим" (kylym), "празнувати" (praznuvaty, "to celebrate") instead of "святкувати" (svjatkuvaty), and many others. Examples from Moldavian include "odecolon" and "subotnic".

Use of Russianisms resulted in creation of Russian-Ukrainian or Russian-Belarusian mixed languages (called surzhyk and trasianka accordingly).

== Personal names ==
Of note is the adoption of the East Slavic-style patronymic surnames (with patronymic suffix '-ov/-ova') and the use of the patronymic part of the personal name for the peoples of Central Asia and Caucasus. After the dissolution of the Soviet Union the usage of native naming has becoming increasingly common. Example: Arsen Fadzaev: Russian: Арсен Сулейманович Фадзаев, Iron Ossetic: Фадзайти Сулемани фурт Арсен. In particular, Russian-style naming for new names of ethnic Tajiks was officially replaced by the national one in Tajikistan in 2016.

== See also ==
- List of English words of Russian origin
- Nadsat, a fictional English-language slang with abounding Russianisms.
