= Surzhyk =

Mixed Ukrainian–Russian language

Surzhyk (Ukrainian and Russian: суржик, Ukrainian pronunciation: [ˈsurʒek], Russian pronunciation: [ˈsurʐɨk]) is a mixture between the Ukrainian and Russian languages, used in certain regions of Ukraine and the neighboring regions of Russia and Moldova. Some consider it a pidgin language, while others argue against it because "harmonious contact between two closely-related languages cannot give rise to a pidgin language". The phenomenon of surzhyk is commonly interpreted as an application of Russian-language words and idioms in combination with Ukrainian speech, which makes it essentially a heavily Russified version of colloquial Ukrainian, although the opposite process can also take place.

The vocabulary mix of each of its constituent languages (Ukrainian and Russian) varies greatly from locality to locality, or sometimes even from person to person, depending on the degree of education, personal experience, rural or urban residence, the geographical origin of the interlocutors, etc. The percentage of Russian words and phonetic influences tends to be greatest in the east and south and in the vicinity of big Russian-speaking cities. It is commonly spoken in most of eastern Ukraine's rural areas, with the exception of the large metropolitan areas of Donetsk, Kharkiv, and Luhansk, where the majority of the population uses standard Russian. In rural areas of western Ukraine, the language spoken contains fewer Russian elements than in central and eastern Ukraine, as historically Russian was not the prestige language in those areas. Nonetheless, western dialects of Ukrainian have also been influenced by Russian.

== Etymology and terminology ==
The term surzhyk (Ukrainian: суржик) comes from the Proto-Slavic roots *sǫ- ("with," "together") and *rъžь ("rye"). Historically, the word referred to the grain product consisting of a mixture of different grains (such as wheat and rye) or the flour and bread produced from such a blend. In its original sense, it meant a lack of purity or a "half-breed" grain, which provided the metaphorical basis for its modern sociolinguistic use. While the term is sometimes associated in popular talk with the word "surrogate" (as in a "surrogate of Ukrainian and Russian"), linguists generally classify this as a folk etymology. This modern association likely reflects the social stigma and perceived "artificiality" of the language rather than its legitimate linguistic origin. The transition from an agricultural term to a label for language contact began as the blending of Ukrainian and Russian features became a prominent feature of the regional linguistic landscape of a Russian influenced Ukraine.

According to Bilaniuk (2005), "Any perceived mixing of different languages may merit the label ["surzhyk"], and perceptions vary depending on individuals' linguistic backgrounds. The term can refer to a high degree of code-switching by bilinguals or to a linguistic code in which the elements of the two languages are inextricably fused. Thus the definition of "surzhyk" as a whole remains primarily ideological, although we can list the influences and forms that fall under this umbrella term". She distinguished five categories of surzhyk:

1. urbanized-peasant surzhyk;
2. village-dialect surzhyk;
3. Sovietized Ukrainian surzhyk;
4. urban bilinguals' surzhyk (habitual language mixing by bilinguals); and
5. post-independence surzhyk.

The first three forms represented the introduction of Russian elements on a Ukrainian base (the first two originally mostly involving 19th-century rural Ukrainians inside Imperial Russia), while in the last two forms, the mixing of languages went both ways, with the post-independence surzhyk (or "reverse surzhyk") mostly representing urban native Russian speakers trying to acquire better Ukrainian language proficiency in independent Ukraine.

Surzhyk is recognized as an intermediate linguistic combination of traditional Ukrainian dialects and standard Russian. Another way to classify this is as a stabilized mesolect. Since it reflects the influence of both Ukrainian and Russian, it is constituted as a mesolectal continuum with regional variants. Surzhyk contrasts the spontaneity of the linguistic process with a regularized system. It is also common for many speakers in central and southern Ukraine to acquire this linguistic system in early childhood.

In a broader context, the term surzhyk is sometimes used as a generic label for various language contacts within the post-Soviet space, such as the Russian-Romanian mixed speech found in Moldova. Within Ukraine, rural dialects in the western regions are often colloquially (though technically inaccurately) called a Polish-Ukrainian surzhyk due to heavy Polish influence; however, linguists distinguish these regional dialects from the Russification patterns of the central and eastern surzhyk. While the word almost exclusively means Ukrainian-Russian mixing when used within Russia, the term in Ukraine can refer to the blending of Ukrainian with any other language but still mainly refers to the mixing with Russian. Because these other forms of surzhyk exist on a dialect continuum, it is practically impossible to draw a boundary between standard Ukrainian, "Ukrainianized" Russian, and the various intermediate iterations of surzhyk.

== Prevalence ==
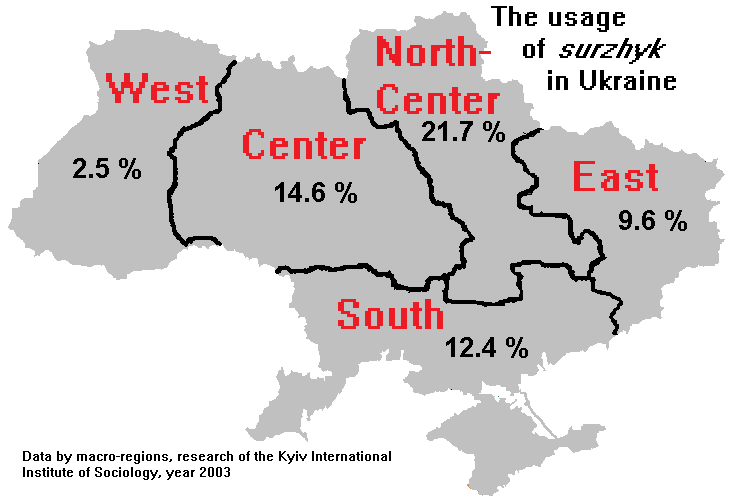
Prevalence of Surzhyk in the regions of Ukraine. Data by Kyiv International Institute of Sociology in 2003.

According to data presented by the Kyiv International Institute of Sociology in 2003, 11% to 18% of the people of Ukraine were found to communicate in Surzhyk. Specifically, in western Ukraine, Surzhyk is spoken by 2.5% of the population, while in the south, it is spoken by over 12.4% of the population. In the east, 9.6% of the population speaks Surzhyk. As Western Ukraine has a higher ratio of Ukrainian speakers to Russian speakers than the rest of Ukraine, the lesser proportion of Surzhyk speakers compared with the east and south is understandable.

One problem in analysing the linguistic status of Ukraine is that there is a tendency for code-switching errors to exist across the entire spectrum of languages. In other words, those who identify themselves as Russian-speaking or Ukrainian-speaking can often be found blending the two languages to some degree. Only a few of these individuals were found to acknowledge the non-standardness of the use of either or both languages, or the fact that they were actually blending Russian and Ukrainian in their speech at all.

== History ==
There is no consensus when Surzhyk first emerged. A minority view holds that it could trace back as far as the 17th century, but a larger group of scholars regards the industralisation and urbanisation of Ukraine in the 19th century as the turning point during which Surzhyk first appeared. Yet another point of view is that Surzhyk originated at the end of the 18th century, when Ukrainian peasants started to have greater contact with the Russian language as Ukrainian society modernized.

In 1721, the Russian Tsar Peter I prohibited the publication of books in Ukraine, except for Russian-language religious works, and decreed that Ukrainian books and records were to burned. In 1786, it was decreed that services in the Ukrainian Orthodox Church were to be conducted using only the Russian pronunciation of Old Church Slavonic, and not the Ukrainian pronunciation. Decrees in 1863, 1876, and 1881 prohibited the publication and importation of Ukrainian books, as well as the public use of the Ukrainian language in general. The Russian regime of the day viewed the use of Ukrainian as evidence of political opposition and harshly suppressed it.

=== Pre-Soviet era ===
Industrialization resulted in workers migrating from Central Russia to Ukrainian cities and the urbanization of the Ukrainian peasantry. Russian civil and military administration, together with cultural, business, religious and educational institutions, soon became forces of linguistic Russification. Ukrainian peasants moving to the cities regarded Russian as being more urban and prestigious than their own language. However, because their schooling in the Russian language was inadequate, most Ukrainian peasants who strove to speak it ended up blending it with their native Ukrainian; this was how Surzhyk was born.

The speaking of pure Ukrainian (i.e. a language without elements of Russian) was for the most part avoided by the urban intelligentsia, because the Ukrainian language was associated with provincialism and nationalism. At this point, the majority of Ukrainians found it easy to become competent in Russian. The association of the Ukrainian language with a rural lifestyle or narrow-minded nationalism encouraged more Ukrainians to adopt Russian as their language of choice. Such decisions led to an increased prevalence of Surzhyk in everyday speech and the further dilution of the Ukrainian language.

The use of the Ukrainian language in theatre and music was also banned, and it had to be translated into other languages. Education in the Ukrainian language also suffered similarly, with ethnically Ukrainian teachers being replaced with ethnic Russians. In the early 20th century, children were punished for speaking Ukrainian to one another in school, and people sometimes lost their jobs for speaking it.

The Kingdom of Hungary's rule in western Ukraine in the late 18th and 19th centuries was also linguistically oppressive. For example, in Zakarpattia, Hungarian was the only language permitted by the regime, so Ukrainian was excluded from institutions like schools. Even so, language policies here were not as restrictive as those applied in eastern Ukraine by the Tsarist regime of Russia.

=== Soviet era ===
In the 1920s, after Ukraine became a part of the Soviet Union, the Ukrainian language saw a revival under the Soviet policy of korenizatsiya (nativisation), which supported the development of non-Russian languages. The purpose was to gain the support of those ethnic groups that had been oppressed by the Tsarist regime. Soviet government business in Ukraine was conducted in the Ukrainian language, with the aim of integrating the Ukrainian people into the new Soviet system. This Ukrainisation brought with it a significant advance in the development, standardisation, and codification of the Ukrainian language. Accompanying it was an increase in the number of Ukrainian-language publications, as well as theatre productions and schools in which Ukrainian was used.

Beginning in the early 1930s, Soviet policy shifted from indigenization (korenizatsiya) toward the promotion of Russian as the primary language of the state. Under the regime of Joseph Stalin, this period saw the active suppression of the Ukrainian language through the purging of the Ukrainian Intelligentsia the forced convergence of Ukrainian orthography and terminology with Russian linguistic models., but it remained overwhelmingly the main language of education. Along with many of the other languages spoken in the Soviet Union, Ukrainian was viewed as a challenge to centralised power and the linguistic unification of the Soviet people. Terminology and wording similar or identical to Russian were emphasized in dictionaries, grammar books, and the official guidance issued to editors and publishers. This resulted in a generally more Russianised Ukrainian than had existed prior to the Soviet Union. After Ukraine became independent, this outcome would eventually generate disagreement regarding the question of what constitutes pure Ukrainian.

Words and other Ukrainian-language speech forms that are similar to those of Russian were emphasised. In addition, many Russian words or terms replaced their Ukrainian equivalents and were then modified by Ukrainian grammar and phonetics. The following table contains a few examples of how the Ukrainian language was changed during the Soviet era.

Pre-Soviet forms	Late Soviet forms	Standard Russian	English translation
Колишній (Kolyshniy)	Бувший (Buvshyy)	Бывший (Byvshiy)	Former
Прибутки (Prybutky)	Доходи (Dokhody)	Доходы (Dokhody)	Revenues
Відтак, відтоді (Vidtak, vidtodi)	З тих пір (Z tykh pir)	С тех пор (S tyekh por)	Since then

Members of the cultural elite who promoted local languages were later purged from positions of authority during the reign of Stalin, as part of an effort to strengthen the cohesion of the Soviet Union and promote Russian as the official language of the Soviet Union.

=== Independence in the modern era ===
After the collapse of the Soviet Union and the emergence of Ukraine as a sovereign state, the Ukrainian language became a key issue in the nation's politics. By the 1989 Law on Languages, Ukrainian became Ukraine's sole state language, and therefore the ability to master it in speech and writing became an required skill for politicians and other prominent officials. Many such individuals were speakers of Russian who began to use Ukrainian, but because they had not perfected it, another form of Surzhyk emerged, which clearly showed the effect of Russification on the Ukrainian language.

Additionally, many Protestants who emigrated to the United States as refugees early in Ukraine’s independence still use antiquated forms of Surzhyk from their respective regions, having missed the language revitalization occurring since Ukraine gained independence. As a result of this migration in the 1990s, Ukrainian protestants in the US tend to use Surzhyk more heavily than speakers in Ukraine, and occasionally note difficulty understanding Ukrainian vocabulary that they were not exposed to during the Soviet era.

Linguists began to engage in debates over the 'correct' way to speak Ukrainian, because the Soviet language policies had had a profound effect on the Ukrainian language. On the one hand, some linguists argue that Ukrainian should only use the forms that existed prior to the Soviet Union, while others argue that the current forms, which emerged from the Soviet language policy, are more up-to-date and more familiar to the Ukrainians of today, and would therefore be better at meeting contemporary needs.

Starting from the 1990s, linguistic research has been performed in order to clarify the causes for the use of surzhyk among parts of the Ukrainian population. In view of modern scholars, the usage of Russian vocabulary on the base of colloquial Ukrainian can be explained by the neglected situation of Ukrainian language in the media, which resulted in many people in the country having a poor knowledge of Ukrainian terms in comparison to Russian. As a result, even those Ukrainians whose attitude to the Ukrainian language is generally positive, may use surzhyk in daily situations, meanwhile others tend to see native elements of Ukrainian language as outdated and prefer to use Russian terms instead. A negative consequence of such practice is the tendency of abandoning surzhyk, seen as an "imperfect" version of Ukrainian, in favour of Russian, a better resourced language in terms of literature as compared to Ukrainian.

== Examples ==
=== Grammar ===
The gender of nouns with the same referent may be different in the two languages, leading to incorrect suffixes on adjectives and verbs. For example, the Russian word for "language" — jazyk (язык) – is masculine, whereas the Ukrainian term mova (мова) is feminine. Several times I heard people speaking about language in Ukrainian but using descriptive adjectives with masculine endings. Often when it came to actually saying the word "language", people would catch their mistakes themselves. The gender distinction is obligatory in both languages, so use of an inappropriately gendered adjective always results in some awkwardness.

— Laada Bilaniuk (2005)

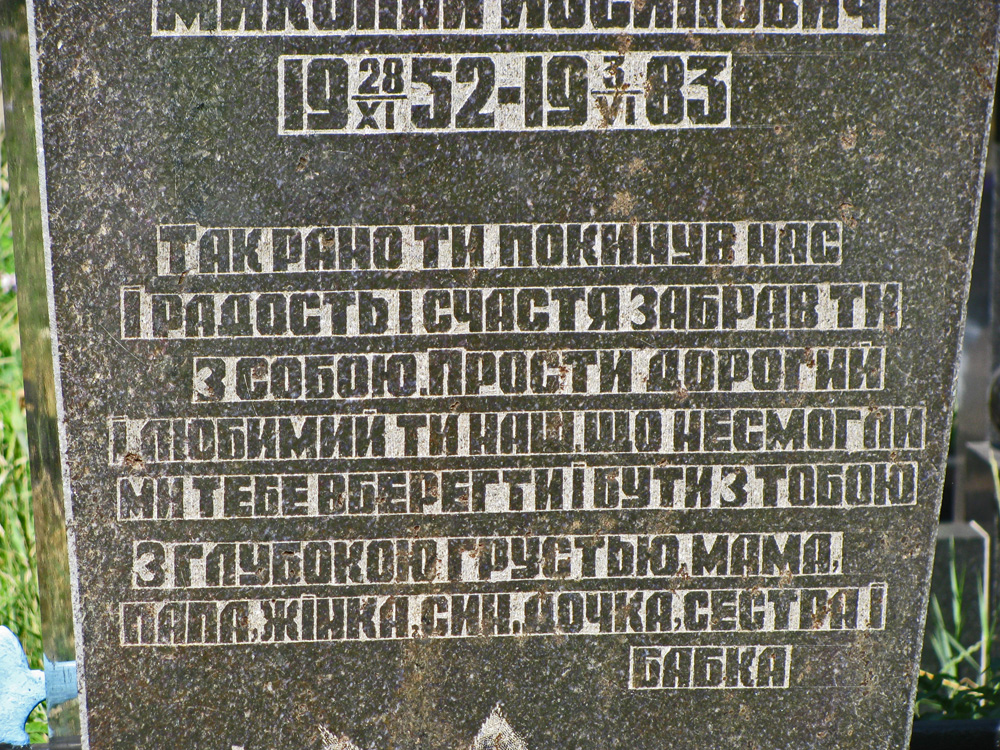
An example of written surzhyk on a grave inscription in Pervomaisk Raion, Mykolaiv Oblast (features influenced by Russian in bold): Так рано ти покинув нас І радость і счастя забрав ти з собою. Прости дорогий і любимий ти наш, що не смогли ми тебе вберегти і бути з тобою. З глубокою грустью, мама, папа, жінка, син, дочка, сестра і бабка.

=== False friends ===
Between Russian and Ukrainian languages there are many words known as interpreter's false friends.

Ukrainian	Semantics in English	Russian	Semantics in English
ласкавий (laskavyi)	kind, good	ласковый (laskovyi)	tender, gentle
господа (hospoda)	dwelling	господа (gospoda)	gentlemen, sirs
красний (krasnyi)	beautiful	красный (krasnyi)	red
дитина (dytyna)	infant	детина (detina)	enormous person (stalwart lad)
час (chas)	time	час (chas)	hour
чоловік (cholovik)	man, male person, husband	человек (chelovek)	person, human
гарбуз (harbuz)	pumpkin	арбуз (arbuz)	watermelon
краватка (kravatka)	tie	кроватка (krovatka)	little bed
качка (kachka)	duck	качка (kachka)	rocking motion
мир (myr)	peace (only)	мир (mir)	the world; peace
світ (svit)	the world	свет (svet)	light (also 'the world', chiefly in set expressions)
корисний (korysnyi)	useful	корыстный (korystnyi)	selfish
вродливий (vrodlyvyi)	beautiful, handsome	уродливый (urodlivyy)	ugly, hideous
неділя (nedilya)	Sunday	неделя (nedelya)	week

== Ethnopolitical issues ==
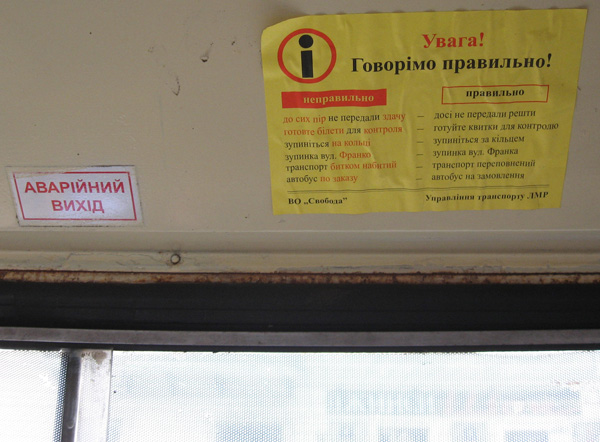
An anti-surzhyk poster in Lviv public transport (2007)

In Soviet times, the usage of Ukrainian gradually decreased, particularly during those times when the Russification policies intensified (i.e. in the 1930s and during the late 1970s to early 1980s), and so a sizable portion of ethnic Ukrainians possess a better knowledge of formal Russian than of formal Ukrainian. Since 1991, however, Ukrainian has been the sole official language. After this change, it was realised that much of the population of Ukraine was actually unable to speak Ukrainian fluently. This was highly apparent in the case of many Ukrainian officials (including the President of Ukraine), who were observed to make code-mixing mistakes in their speech.

The prevalence of Surzhyk is greatest in the countryside. In the cities, people tend to speak more standard forms of Ukrainian or Russian. This contrasts with the more rural inhabitants, who lack the prestige associated with the educational and technological advantages that people in the cities have. However, in spite of the differences that exist between the rural and urban varieties of the spoken language, many visitors find that they have trouble communicating with the local population of Ukraine when they follow guidebooks published abroad. This is because these books tend to focus on either pure Russian or pure Ukrainian and disregard the hybrid form.

Russian is still the language heard on the street [in Odesa], but by now everyone understands Ukrainian, and many locals will pepper their conversations patriotically with Ukrainian, developing a local variety of Surzhyk – that mix of Ukrainian and Russian heard across most of the country.

— Kyiv Post (2024)

The speaking of Surzhyk instead of Russian or Ukrainian is viewed negatively by nationalist language activists. Because it is neither one nor the other, they regard Surzhyk as a threat to the uniqueness of Ukrainian culture. On the other hand, since the 2013–2014 Revolution of Dignity and beginning of the Russo-Ukrainian War, and especially since the 2022 full-scale Russian invasion of Ukraine, large groups of Ukrainians who were raised speaking and writing Russian have been making the conscious choice of linguistic conversion to Ukrainian. Individuals in this process find themselves mixing both languages on occasion (called "Neo-Surzhyk" by some researchers), and while striving to learn "proper" Ukrainian, many of them have been reclaiming Surzhyk as a positive, necessary first step in their transition away from Russian towards Ukrainian.

Whereas traditional views mostly negatively evaluate Surzhyk as "impure" or a "corruption" of either Ukrainian or Russian, this Neo-Surzhyk by native Russian speakers switching to Ukrainian is perceived as "better than Russian", and as part of the Ukrainian language, or at least part of the journey towards standard Ukrainian. Since 2022, the emergence of such a new Surzhyk has been observed in cities such as Odesa, which has been a cultural and ethnolinguistic crossroads since its foundation in 1792, and used to be overwhelmingly Russian-speaking. But Odesa's residents (including many internally displaced people from southern and eastern Ukraine) have been consciously increasingly taking Ukrainian courses, and introducing more forms of Ukrainian into their everyday language usage for patriotic purposes, without necessarily abandoning Russian altogether yet.

== Literature ==
Nikolai Gogol used the language extensively in his short story collection Evenings on a Farm Near Dikanka. Surzhyk has been an object of parody in Ukrainian literature since the very emergence of the Ukrainian literary language. For example, in the 1798 poem Eneyida, written by Ivan Kotlyarevsky and based on the Latin poem Aeneid, for satirical purposes the character "Filozop" speaks Surzhyk while standing over the dead Pallas.

== In popular culture ==
Surzhyk is often also used for comic effect in the arts. Examples include the short plays of Les Poderviansky, and the repertoire of the pop star Verka Serdyuchka. The punk-rock group Braty Hadyukiny (literally “viper's brothers”) sings many of its songs in Surzhyk, often to underscore the rural simplicity of its songs' protagonists.

== See also ==
- Azirivka, awkward Ukrainian speech of Russophone Ukrainian politicians
- Balachka — dialects of Kuban Cossacks
- Odesan Russian — a Russian dialect on Ukrainian soil
- Russification — the process of introducing the Russian language into non-Russian communities
  - Russification of Ukraine
- Trasianka — an interlanguage derived from Belarusian and Russian, spoken in Belarus
- West Polesian — a transitional dialect between Ukrainian and Belarusian.

== Bibliography ==
- Bilaniuk, Laada (2004). "A typology of surzhyk: Mixed Ukrainian-Russian language". International Journal of Bilingualism. 8 (4): 409–425. doi:10.1177/13670069040080040101. Wikidata Q107103120.
- Bilaniuk, L. (2005). Contested Tongues: Language Politics and Cultural Correction in Ukraine. Cornell Paperbacks. Cornell University Press. p. 230. ISBN 978-0-8014-7279-4.
- Del Gaudio S. On the Nature of Suržyk: a Double Perspective. Wiener Slawistischer Almanach, Sonderband 75. München – Berlin – Wien 2010.
- Maxwell, Olga; Kudriavtseva, Natalia; Skubii, Iryna (18 March 2024). "Reclaiming Surzhyk: Ukraine's Linguistic Decolonisation". E-International Relations.
- Podolyan, Ilona E. (20 July 2005). "How Do Ukrainians Communicate? (Observations Based upon Youth Population of Kyiv)". Journal of Intercultural Communication. 5 (2): 1–14. doi:10.36923/jicc.v5i2.410. ISSN 1404-1634.
