= University of California, Santa Cruz =

Public university in Santa Cruz, California

- Motto: Fiat lux (Latin)
- Motto in English: "Let there be light"
- Type: Public land-grant research university
- Established: 1965; 61 years ago
- Parent institution: University of California
- Accreditation: WSCUC
- Academic affiliations: AAU; APRU; URA; space-grant
- Endowment: $359.62 million (2025)
- Chancellor: Cynthia Larive
- Provost: Lori Kletzer
- Students: 19,938 (fall 2024)
- Undergraduates: 17,940 (fall 2024)
- Postgraduates: 1,998 (fall 2024)
- Location: Santa Cruz, California, United States; 37.00°N 122.06°W
- Campus: 6,088 acres (2,464 ha); Small city
- Other campuses: Santa Clara; Marina; Scotts Valley
- Newspaper: City on a Hill Press
- Colors: Blue and gold
- Nickname: Banana Slugs
- Sporting affiliations: NCAA Division III – C2C; ASC
- Mascot: Sammy the Slug
- Website: ucsc.edu

The University of California, Santa Cruz (UC Santa Cruz or UCSC) is a public land-grant research university in Santa Cruz, California, United States. It is one of the ten campuses in the University of California system. Located on Monterey Bay, on the edge of the coastal community of Santa Cruz, the main campus lies on 2,001 acres (810 ha) of rolling, forested hills overlooking the Pacific Ocean. As of Fall 2024, its ten residential colleges enroll some 17,940 undergraduate and 1,998 graduate students. Satellite facilities in other Santa Cruz locations include the Coastal Science Campus and the Westside Research Park and the Silicon Valley Center in Santa Clara, along with administrative control of the Lick Observatory near San Jose in the Diablo Range and the Keck Observatory near the summit of Mauna Kea in Hawaii.

Founded in 1965, UC Santa Cruz is a collegiate university, using a residential college system consisting of ten small colleges that were established as a variation of the Oxbridge university system.

Among the faculty are Nobel Prize laureates, Fulbright Scholars, Breakthrough Prize in Life Sciences recipients, 19 members of the National Academy of Sciences, 32 members of the American Academy of Arts and Sciences, and 46 members of the American Association for the Advancement of Science. UC Santa Cruz alumni include 13 Pulitzer Prizes for 11 recipients, 7 MacArthur 'genius' Award fellows, Rhodes Scholars, Fulbright Scholars, and Marshall Scholars, amongst others. UC Santa Cruz is classified among "R1: Doctoral Universities – Very high research activity". The university is also a member of the Association of American Universities.

== History ==
=== Prior to campus development ===
Prior to Spanish colonization, the Uypi tribe of the Awaswas Nation, who spoke Mutsun Costanoan of the Ohlone peoples, lived in what is now the campus of UCSC. During this time, the missionaries of Mission Santa Cruz removed a part of the forest to build a vineyard on top of what is now the Great Meadow.

After the California Gold Rush, many mining firms came to the area. The Cowell Lime Works operated on the entirety of what is now the Santa Cruz campus until 1920.

=== Site selection and campus planning ===
Although some of the original founders had already outlined plans for an institution like UCSC as early as the 1930s, the opportunity to realize their vision did not present itself until the City of Santa Cruz made a bid to the UC Board of Regents in the mid-1950s to build a campus just outside town, in the foothills of the Santa Cruz Mountains. During the mid-1950s, there was widespread public sentiment in favor of the establishment of a new UC campus somewhere south of the original campus at Berkeley. In 1957, the California State Senate passed a resolution asking the Regents to consider the Monterey Peninsula, and that same year, the California State Assembly passed its own resolution asking the Regents to consider the Santa Clara Valley. In December 1959, the Regents voted to focus their site selection process on the Almaden Valley in San Jose (i.e., within the Santa Clara Valley and the larger region now known as Silicon Valley), but the public announcement of the Regents' decision immediately caused property values throughout that area to increase to the extent that the Regents could no longer afford to buy the necessary land. After another year of study, the Regents finally selected Santa Cruz as the location of the next UC campus.

However, Santa Cruz was selected for the beauty, rather than the practicality, of its location, and its remoteness led to the decision to develop a residential college system that would house most of the students on-campus. The formal design process for the Santa Cruz campus began in the late 1950s, culminating in the Long Range Development Plan of 1963. 1963 was also the year when the Regional History Project, an oral history project and the first major research project of UCSC, was started. Its purpose was originally to interview longtime residents of the Central California Coast area in order to help better understand the history of the region. Originally concentrated in the economic history of the area, it expanded to also cover the social and cultural history of the region before expanding its scope in 1967 to include a series of interviews on the history of UCSC and the Lick Observatory. These series of interviews later expanded in scope and lead to a two volume series, Seeds of Something Different: An Oral History of the University of California, Santa Cruz. UCSC is one of only two UC campuses to have an oral history projected dedicated to covering the history of the area around the university and the university itself.

Planning the new UC campus was just as hard as picking the site. The first plan was to build the campus on what is now the Great Meadow, so it would be close to the existing city of Santa Cruz. The second plan, conceived by Thomas Church, put the colleges into the redwood forest at the top of the hill above the Great Meadow. This was clearly the better idea, but presented the problem of how to place the colleges inside the forest. The original design for College One (Cowell College) scattered its buildings among the trees, which was sarcastically compared by one regent to "a series of motels on the shores of Lake Tahoe." Having recently visited Aigues-Mortes, UC President Clark Kerr was inspired by the layout of that French medieval town to suggest concentrating each college's buildings into distinct clusters in the forest, and that is how UC Santa Cruz was actually built.

Construction started by 1964, and the university was able to accommodate its first students (albeit living in trailers on what is now the East Field athletic area) in 1965. The campus was intended to be a showcase for contemporary architecture, progressive teaching methods, and undergraduate research. According to founding chancellor Dean McHenry, the purpose of the distributed college system was to combine the benefits of a major research university with the intimacy of a smaller college. Kerr shared a passion with former Stanford roommate McHenry to build a university modeled as "several Swarthmores" (i.e., small liberal arts colleges) in close proximity to each other. Both men were well aware that Santa Cruz "was located in the shadow not only of Berkeley but also of Stanford, and was bound to remain in their shadows for a very long time to come and perhaps forever." Therefore, they hoped to shape a "distinctive personality" for the Santa Cruz campus and let it "flourish as first rate within its own type."

=== Kerr's account of the early years ===
In his memoirs, Kerr ruefully recounted the myriad errors made by himself and McHenry in launching the new campus. They had created Santa Cruz as the "most experimental" of the UC campuses, but opened it just in time for their cherished "Santa Cruz dream" to die amidst the counterculture of the 1960s. Santa Cruz quickly became the "counterculture campus" where students and faculty either "mellowed out" among the redwood trees or turned into "activist-radical[s]". For example, when Kerr came to deliver an address at UC Santa Cruz's first commencement exercises in 1969, the ceremony was hijacked by students who denounced Kerr and McHenry for having "planned and created Santa Cruz as a capitalist-imperialist-fascist plot to divert the students from their revolution against the evils of American society and, in particular, against the horrors of the Vietnam War." The students then tried to award an honorary degree to Huey P. Newton (who was in jail at the time, although he went on to earn his bachelor's, master's, and doctorate degrees at Santa Cruz). Kerr later recalled this episode of "guerrilla theatre" as "one of the worst afternoons of my life."

According to Kerr's account, during the 1970s, the quality of UC Santa Cruz's incoming freshman classes deteriorated as Baby Boom students increasingly chose to matriculate at less experimental UC campuses in order to major in subjects such as engineering and business administration (both absent from Santa Cruz).

Another factor behind a decrease in quality was a series of "grisly murders" around Santa Cruz, which at the time was labeled the "murder capital of the world". The average SAT scores of UC Santa Cruz's incoming students dropped from 1250 in the early 1970s to 1050 by the early 1980s.

=== Sinsheimer Reforms ===
A series of major reforms were implemented by Chancellor Robert L. Sinsheimer (1977–1987) at the cost of making Santa Cruz less experimental and more conventional. In 1981, after a two-year battle, the faculty narrowly voted to give students the option of receiving grades for the first time, in lieu of Santa Cruz's traditional narrative evaluations. By the fall of 1984, 45% of Santa Cruz students were already majoring in the sciences, and that year, the campus offered computer engineering as a major for the first time (in order to take advantage of its proximity to Silicon Valley), followed by business economics a year later. In May 1985, Sinsheimer, a molecular biologist, welcomed several scientists to Santa Cruz for one of the first meetings at which the idea of a Human Genome Project was discussed.

Sinsheimer got Santa Cruz involved in intercollegiate athletics for the first time as part of NCAA Division III. In 1981, he supported student athletes' preference for the sea lion as the campus mascot, but was forced to back down in 1986 when the student body voted to support the banana slug instead.

By the early 1990s, the campus was still inefficient in that average teaching loads were still light compared to other UC campuses, but SAT scores had stopped falling, the faculty was performing good research, and the campus was beginning to rise in university rankings. In 1997, an engineering school was finally launched.

In 2019, the University of California, Santa Cruz was elected to the Association of American Universities (AAU), the most prestigious alliance of American research universities. Along with UCI, UC Santa Cruz was the youngest university to gain admittance to the AAU.

=== 2020 strike action ===
On December 9, 2019, over 200 graduate student-workers initiated a wildcat strike by withholding Fall quarter grades with the following demands: (1) a COLA (cost of living adjustment) of $1,412/month to address the housing crisis in Santa Cruz, (2) a promise of non-retaliation against those participating in the strike, and (3) a cap on tuition for undergraduate students, to ensure that the increase in graduate student-worker pay would not increase the rent-burden and precarity of their students. On February 10, 2020, graduate student-workers responded to disciplinary threats from UCSC administrators with a full teaching strike, including withholding grades. UCSC administrators' called in police from various counties. 17 students were arrested, and several were injured, but UCSC denied the claims of police brutality and excessive force. On February 27, 2020, UC Davis and UC Santa Barbara joined the strike. On February 28, 2020, 54 graduate student-workers were terminated and continued strikes shut down the campus for at least one day the following week. The arrival of the COVID-19 pandemic led to the end of the strike. On August 7, 2020, UCSC agreed to reinstate 41 graduate student-workers, allowing them to be rehired by their respective departments, while also agreeing to seal their disciplinary records and reinstate their funding guarantees. In return, UAW, who represents UC graduate student-workers but did not authorize the strike at any point, agreed to drop complaints filed on behalf of the graduate student-workers. UCSC also granted graduate student-workers a $2,500 annual housing stipend, but did not grant the COLA adjustment or cap on tuition for undergraduate students.

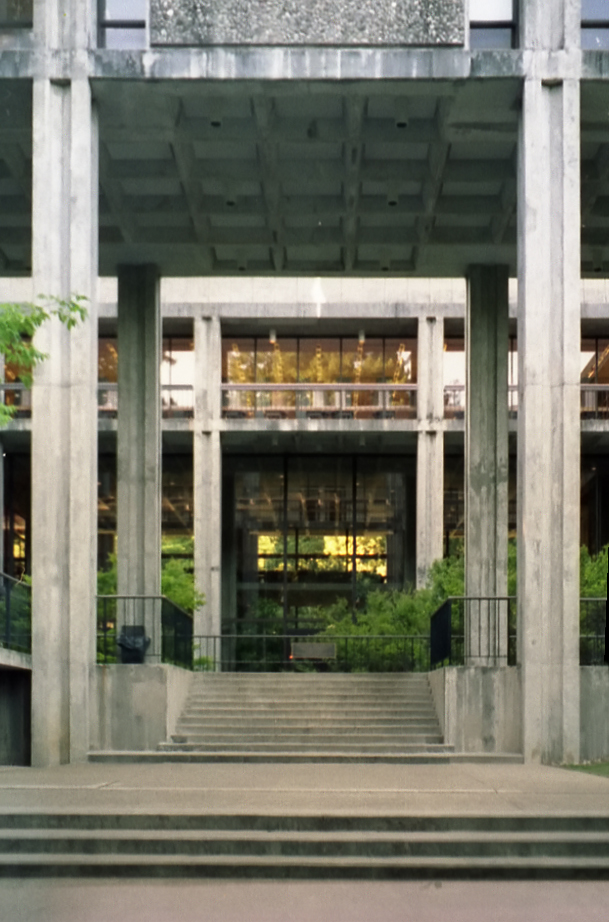
McHenry Library

=== Impact on Santa Cruz ===
Although the city of Santa Cruz already exhibited a strong conservation ethic before the founding of the university, the coincidental rise of the counterculture of the 1960s together with the university's establishment fundamentally altered its subsequent development. Early student and faculty activism at UCSC pioneered an approach to environmentalism that greatly impacted the industrial development of the surrounding area. The lowering of the voting age to 18 in 1971 led to the emergence of a powerful student-voting bloc. A large and growing population of politically liberal UCSC alumni changed the electorate of the town from predominantly Republican to markedly left-leaning, consistently voting against expansion measures on the part of both town and gown.

UCSC	Chancellors
†Died in office

=== Expansion plans ===
Plans for increasing enrollment to 19,500 students and adding 1,500 faculty and staff by 2020, and the anticipated environmental impacts of such action, encountered opposition from the city, the local community, and the student body. City voters in 2006 passed two measures calling on UCSC to pay for the impacts of campus growth. A Santa Cruz Superior Court judge invalidated the measures, ruling they were improperly put on the ballot. In 2008, the university, city, county and neighborhood organizations reached an agreement to set aside numerous lawsuits and allow the expansion to occur. UCSC agreed to local government scrutiny of its north campus expansion plans, to provide housing for 67 percent of the additional students on campus, and to pay municipal development and water fees.

George Blumenthal, UCSC's 10th Chancellor, intended to mitigate growth constraints in Santa Cruz by developing off-campus sites in Silicon Valley. The NASA Ames Research Center campus is planned to ultimately hold 2,000 UCSC students – about 10% of the entire university's future student body as envisioned for 2020.

In April 2010, UC Santa Cruz opened its new $35 million Digital Arts Research Center; a project in planning since 2004.

The $72 million Coastal Biology Building officially opened on 21 October 2017 on the Coastal Science Campus. The new campus houses the Ecology & Evolutionary Biology Department and faculty interested in the study of ecology and evolution in ocean, terrestrial and freshwater environments.

== Main Campus ==
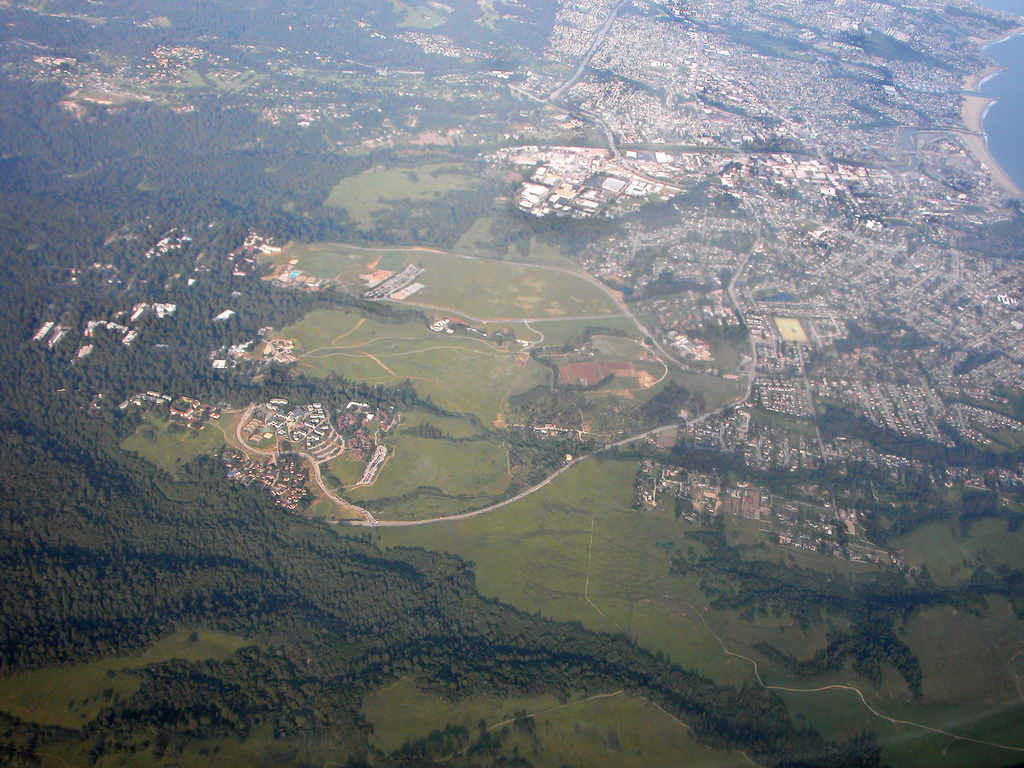
UCSC & Santa Cruz aerial view. The Great Meadow is the undeveloped area between city and university

The 2,000-acre (810 ha) UCSC main campus is located 75 miles (121 km) south of San Francisco, in the Ben Lomond Mountain ridge of the Santa Cruz Mountains. Elevation varies from 285 feet (87 m) at the campus entrance to 1,195 feet (364 m) at the northern boundary, a difference of about 900 feet (270 m). The southern portion of the campus primarily consists of a large, open meadow, locally known as the Great Meadow. To the north of the meadow lie most of the campus' buildings, many of them among redwood groves. The campus is bounded on the south by the city's upper-west-side neighborhoods, on the east by Harvey West Park and the Pogonip open space preserve, on the north by Henry Cowell Redwoods State Park near the town of Felton, and on the west by Gray Whale Ranch, a portion of Wilder Ranch State Park. The campus is built on a portion of the Cowell Family ranch, which was purchased by the University of California in 1961. The northern half of the campus property has remained in its undeveloped, forested state apart from fire roads and hiking and bicycle trails. The heavily forested area has allowed UC Santa Cruz to operate a recreational vehicle park as a form of student housing since 1984. However in 2024 UCSC announced the closure of this park, known as the camper park, due to rising concerns about fire safety, along with mold issues and rising maintenance requests that had created an unsafe situation in the park. In 2017 the University finished building the Coastal Science Facility for the Ecology and Evolutionary Biology Department. The facility, equipped with teaching classrooms, labs and greenhouses, is located on McAllister Way. In the same year, renovations to the campus' Quarry Amphitheater were completed.

A number of shrines, dens and other student-built curiosities are scattered around the northern campus. These structures, mostly assembled from branches and other forest detritus, were formerly concentrated in the area known as Elfland, a glen the university razed in 1992 to build colleges Nine and Ten. Students were able to relocate and save some of the structures, however.

Creeks traverse the UCSC campus within several ravines. Footbridges span those ravines on pedestrian paths linking various areas of campus. The footbridges make it possible to walk to any part of campus within 20 minutes in spite of the campus being built on a mountainside with varying elevations. At night, orange lights illuminate the occasionally fogged-in paths.

There are a number of natural points of interest throughout the UCSC grounds. The "Porter Caves" are a popular site among students on the west side of campus. The entrance is located in the forest between the Porter College meadow and Empire Grade Road. The caves wind through a set of caverns, some of which are challenging, narrow passages. Tree Nine is another popular destination for students. A large Douglas fir spanning approximately 103 feet (31 m) tall, Tree Nine is located in the upper campus of UCSC behind College Nine. The tree had been a popular climbing spot for many years but due to environmental corrosion and fear of student injuries, UC ground services sawed off the limbs to make it nearly impossible to climb. Less experienced tree-climbers also used to frequent Sunset Tree located on the east side of the meadow behind the UCSC Music Center, but the lower branches of this tree were also cut off to make climbing the tree difficult.

The UCSC campus is also one of the few homes to Mima Mounds in the United States. They are rare in the United States and in the world in general.

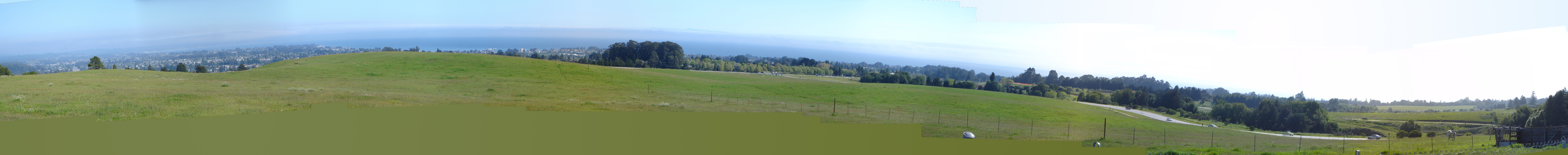
Panorama of Great Meadow

== Academics ==
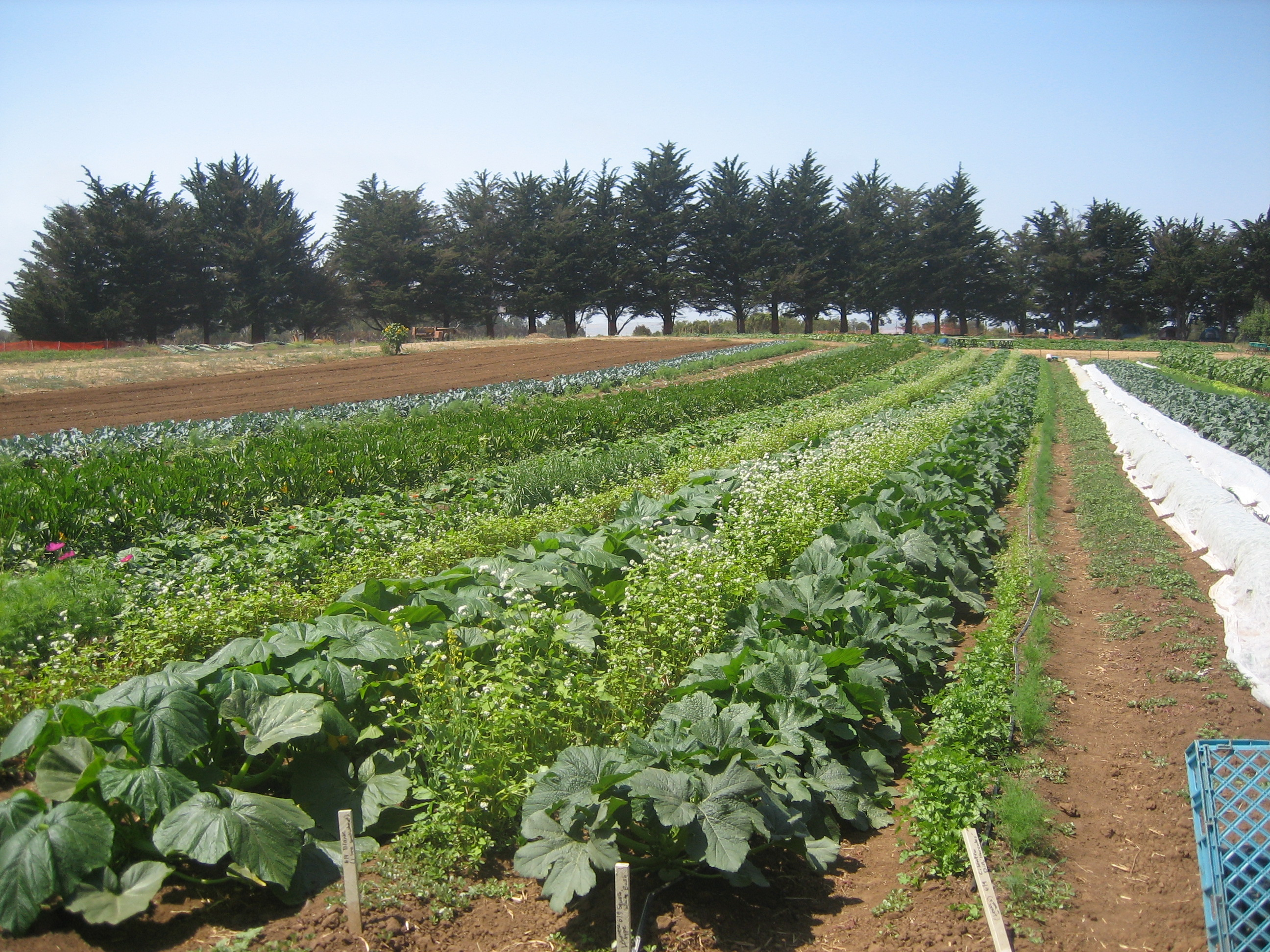
Organic farm rows

The university has 5 academic divisions and 1 School (In parentheses their founding): Arts (2017), Social Sciences (2017), Humanities (2017), Graduate Studies (2017) Physical & Biological Sciences (2017), and the Baskin School of Engineering (1997). Together, they offer 66 graduate programs, 74 undergraduate majors, and 43 minors.

Popular undergraduate majors include Art, Business Management Economics, Chemistry, Molecular and Cell Biology, Physics, and Psychology. Interdisciplinary programs, such as Computational Media, Feminist Studies, Environmental Studies, Visual Studies, Digital Arts and New Media, Critical Race & Ethnic Studies, and the History of Consciousness Department are also hosted alongside UCSC's more traditional academic departments.

A joint program with UC Hastings enables UC Santa Cruz students to earn a bachelor's degree and Juris Doctor degree in six years instead of the usual seven. The "3+3 BA/JD" Program between UC Santa Cruz and UC Hastings College of the Law in San Francisco accepted its first applicants in fall 2014. UCSC students who declare their intent in their freshman or early sophomore year will complete three years at UCSC and then move on to UC Hastings to begin the three-year law curriculum. Credits from the first year of law school will count toward a student's bachelor's degree. Students who successfully complete the first-year law course work will receive their bachelor's degree and be able to graduate with their UCSC class, then continue at UC Hastings afterwards for two years.

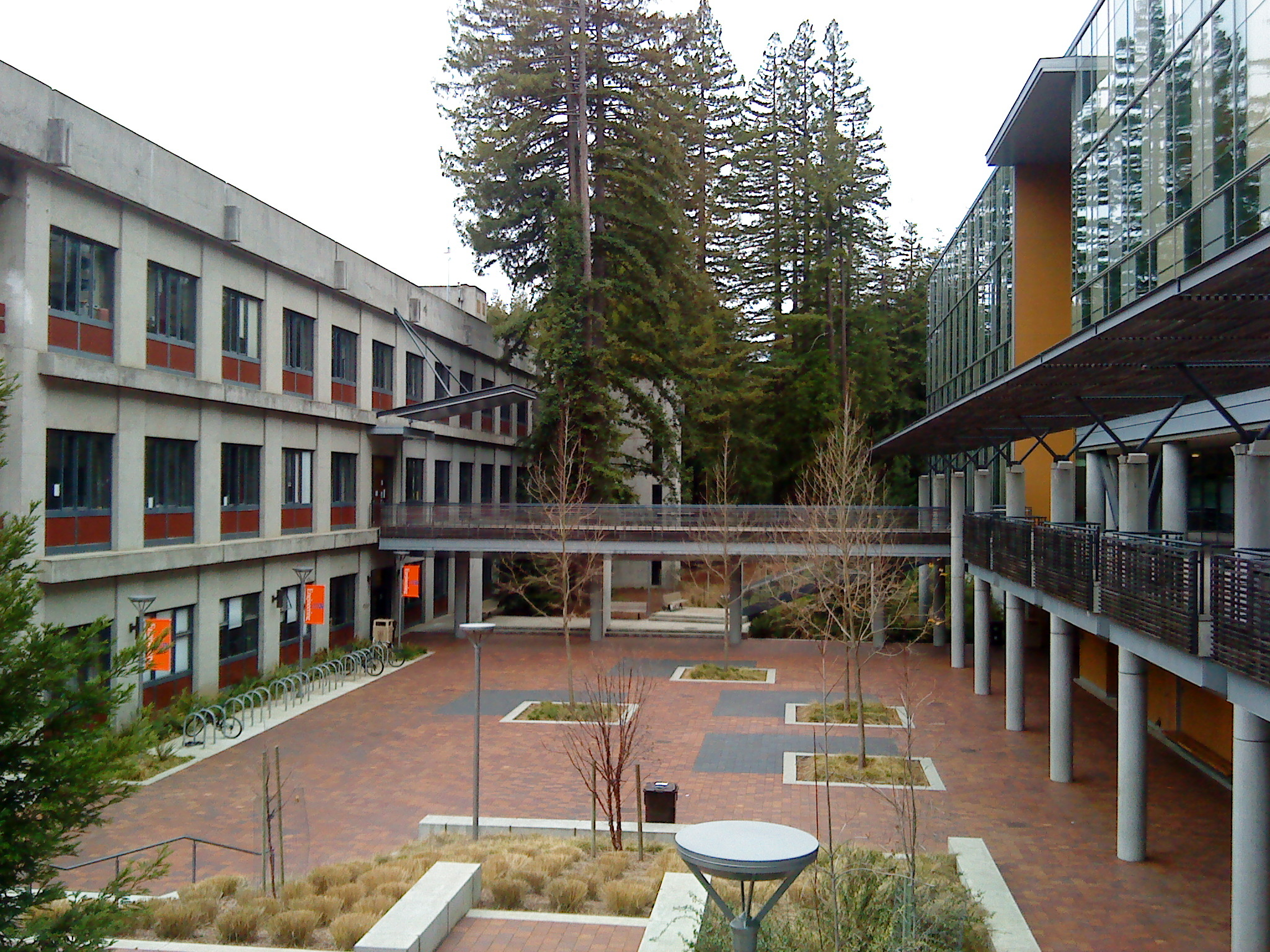
Baskin Engineering Plaza

=== Research ===
According to the National Science Foundation, UC Santa Cruz spent $203.883 million on research and development in 2023, ranking it 138th in the nation.

Although designed as a liberal arts-oriented university, UCSC quickly acquired a graduate-level natural science research component with the appointment of plant physiologist Kenneth V. Thimann as the first provost of Crown College. Thimann developed UCSC's early Division of Natural Sciences and recruited other well-known science faculty and graduate students to the fledgling campus. Immediately upon its founding, UCSC was also granted administrative responsibility for the Lick Observatory, which established the campus as a major center for astronomy research. Founding members of the Social Science and Humanities faculty created the unique History of Consciousness graduate program in UCSC's first year of operation.

UCSC's organic farm and garden program is the oldest in the country, and pioneered organic horticulture techniques internationally.

As of 2025, UCSC's faculty include 16 members of the National Academy of Sciences, 29 fellows of the American Academy of Arts and Sciences, 17 recipients of the 2025 Breakthrough Prize in Fundamental Physics, and 49 fellows of the American Association for the Advancement of Science. The Baskin School of Engineering, founded in 1997 is UCSC's first and only professional school. Baskin Engineering is home to several research centers, including the Center for Biomolecular Science and Engineering and Cyberphysical Systems Research Center, which are gaining recognition, as has the work that UCSC researchers David Haussler and Jim Kent have done on the Human Genome Project, including the widely used UCSC Genome Browser. Also associated with the Baskin School is the off-campus Westside Research Park. UCSC administers the National Science Foundation's Center for Adaptive Optics.

Off-campus research facilities maintained by UCSC include the Lick and Keck Observatories, the Long Marine Laboratory, and the Westside Research Park. From September 2003 to July 2016, UCSC managed a University Affiliated Research System (UARC) for the NASA Ames Research Center under a task order contract valued at more than $330 million.

=== Rankings ===
Academic rankings

National
- Forbes: 63
- U.S. News & World Report: 109
- Washington Monthly: 118
- WSJ/College Pulse: 253

Global
- ARWU: 151–200
- QS: =458
- THE: 201–250
- U.S. News & World Report: 129

National Program Rankings
Program	Ranking
Biological Sciences	58
Chemistry	85
Computer Science	50
Earth Sciences	27
Education	148
English	35
Economics	53
Engineering	75
Fine Arts	64
History	63
Mathematics	73
Physics	47
Political Science	89
Psychology	68
Sociology	70

Global Subject Rankings
Program	Ranking
Space Science	13
Geosciences	90
Biology & Biochemistry	107
Molecular Biology & Genetics	60
Environment/Ecology	90
Arts & Humanities	170
Plant & Animal Science	169
Physics	183
Computer Science	526
Chemistry	631
Social Sciences & Public Health	442

UC Santa Cruz was ranked 129th in the list of Best Global Universities and tied for 82nd in the list of Best National Universities in the United States by U.S. News & World Report's 2024 rankings. In 2021, UC Santa Cruz was ranked the No. 3 public university in the nation for "making an impact" and No. 4 for promoting social mobility. In 2023, the university was ranked No. 5 in game/simulation development and No. 2 among the best public game design colleges in the U.S.

UC Santa Cruz was ranked top 10 in excellence in undergraduate teaching in 2022 and third in research influence in 2018.

In 2017 Kiplinger ranked UC Santa Cruz 50th out of the top 100 best-value public colleges and universities in the nation, and 3rd in California. Money Magazine ranked UC Santa Cruz 41st in the country out of the nearly 1500 schools it evaluated for its 2016 Best Colleges ranking. In 2016–2017, UC Santa Cruz was rated 146th in the world by Times Higher Education World University Rankings. In 2016 it was ranked 83rd in the world by the Academic Ranking of World Universities and 296th worldwide in 2016 by the QS World University Rankings.

In 2009, RePEc, an online database of research economics articles, ranked the UCSC Economics Department sixth in the world in the field of international finance. In 2007, High Times magazine placed UCSC as first among US universities as a "counterculture college". In 2009, The Princeton Review (with GamePro magazine) ranked UC Santa Cruz's Game Design major among the top 50 in the country. In 2011, The Princeton Review and GamePro Media ranked UC Santa Cruz's graduate programs in Game Design as seventh in the nation. In 2012, UCSC was ranked No. 3 in the Most Beautiful Campus list of Princeton Review.

== Residential colleges ==
The undergraduate program, with only the partial exception of those majors run through the university's Baskin School of Engineering, is still based on the version of the "residential college system" outlined by Clark Kerr and Dean McHenry at the inception of their original plans for the campus (see History, above). Upon admission, all undergraduate students have the opportunity to choose one of ten colleges, with which they usually stay affiliated for their entire undergraduate careers. There are cases where some students switch college affiliations as each college holds a different graduation ceremony. Almost all faculty members are affiliated with a college as well. The individual colleges provide housing and dining services, while the university as a whole offers courses and majors to the general student community. Other universities with similar college systems include Rice University and the University of California, San Diego.

Each college features its own distinctive architectural style and a resident faculty provost as its nominal head. First-year students take a mandatory core course tailored to their college, with a curriculum and central theme unique. College resident populations vary from about 750 to 1,550 students, with roughly half of undergraduates living on campus within their college community or in smaller, intramural campus communities such as the International Living Center, Redwood Grove, Porter transfer community, and the Village. Coursework, academic majors and general areas of study are not limited by college membership, although colleges host the offices of many other academic departments. Graduate students are not affiliated with a residential college, though a large portion of their offices have historically tended to be based in the colleges. The ten colleges are, in order of establishment:

The 10 Residential Colleges

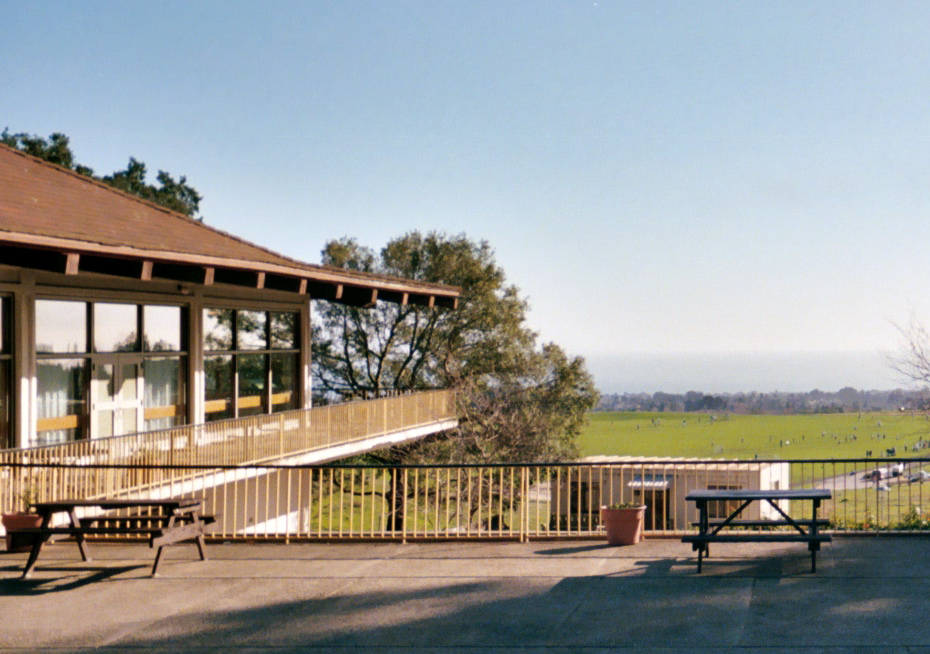
Cowell College

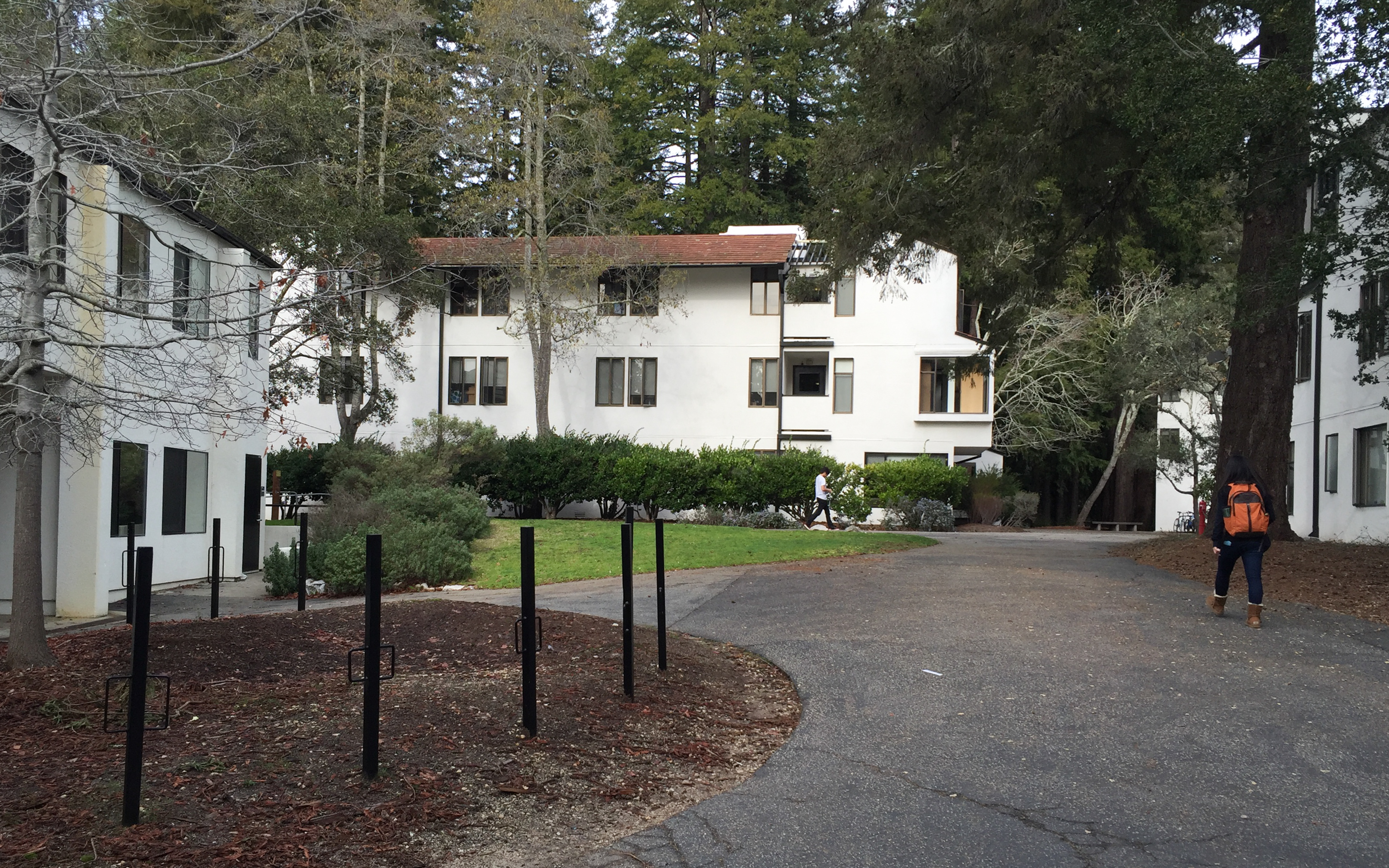
Stevenson College

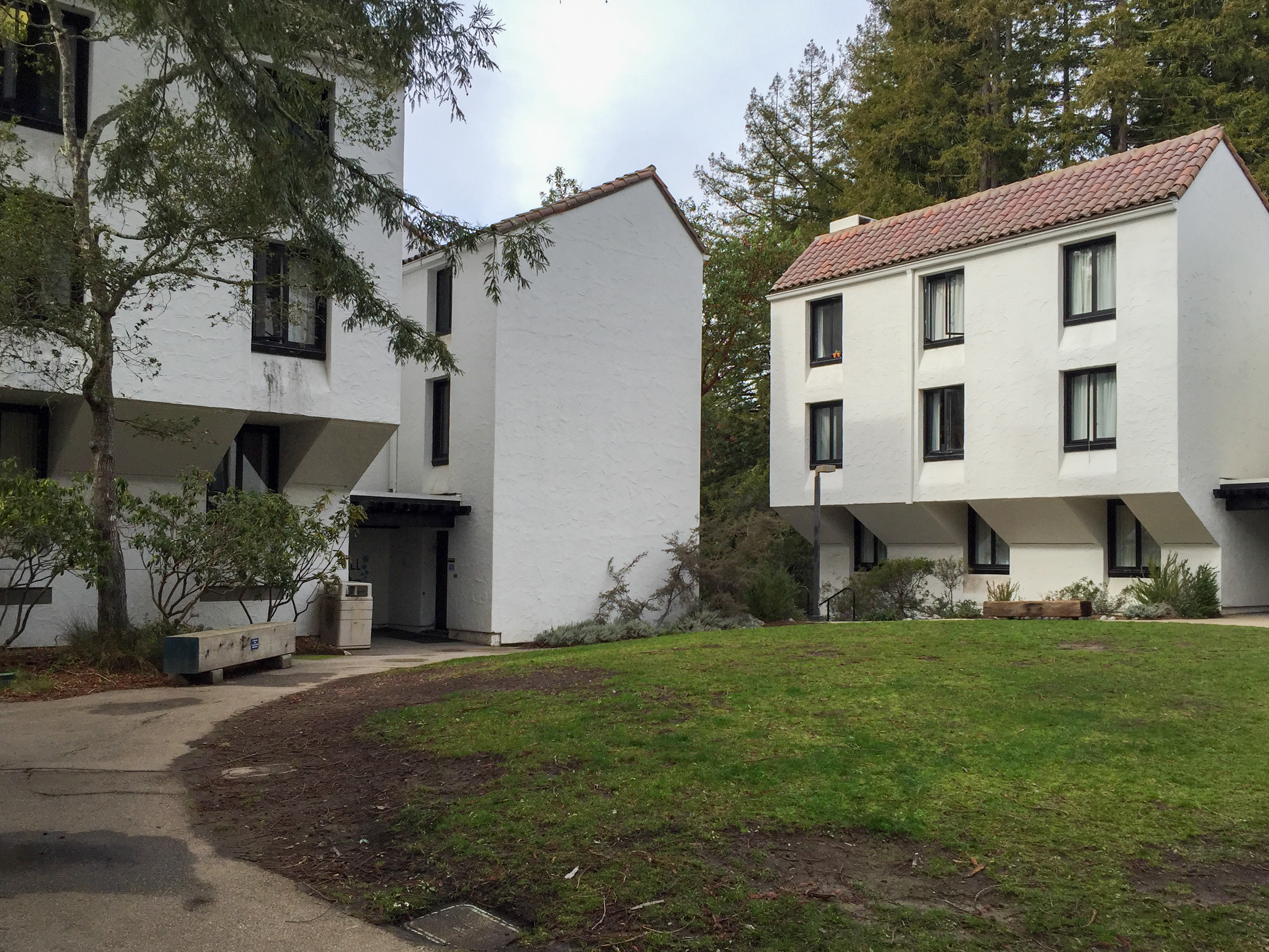
Crown College

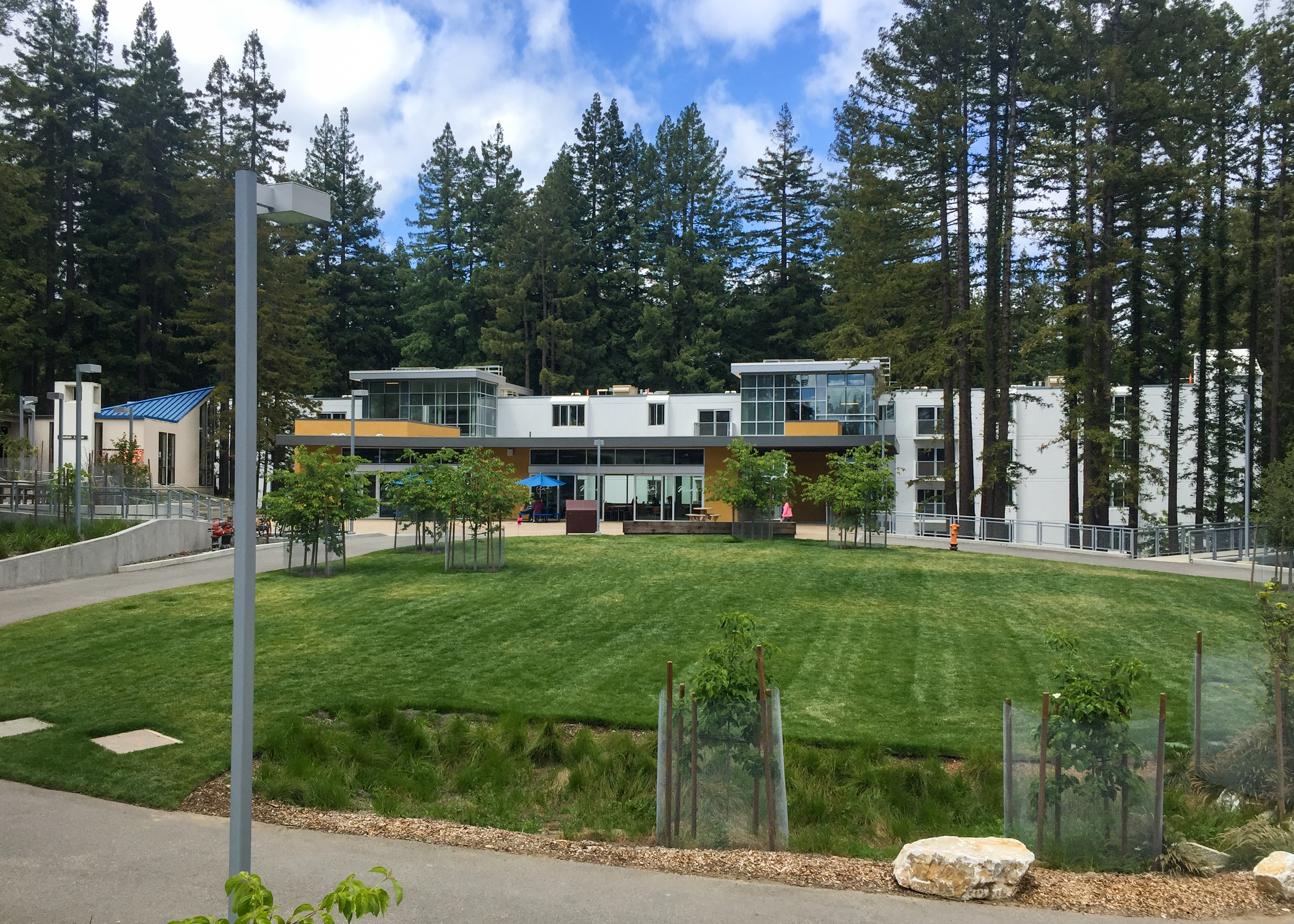
Merrill College

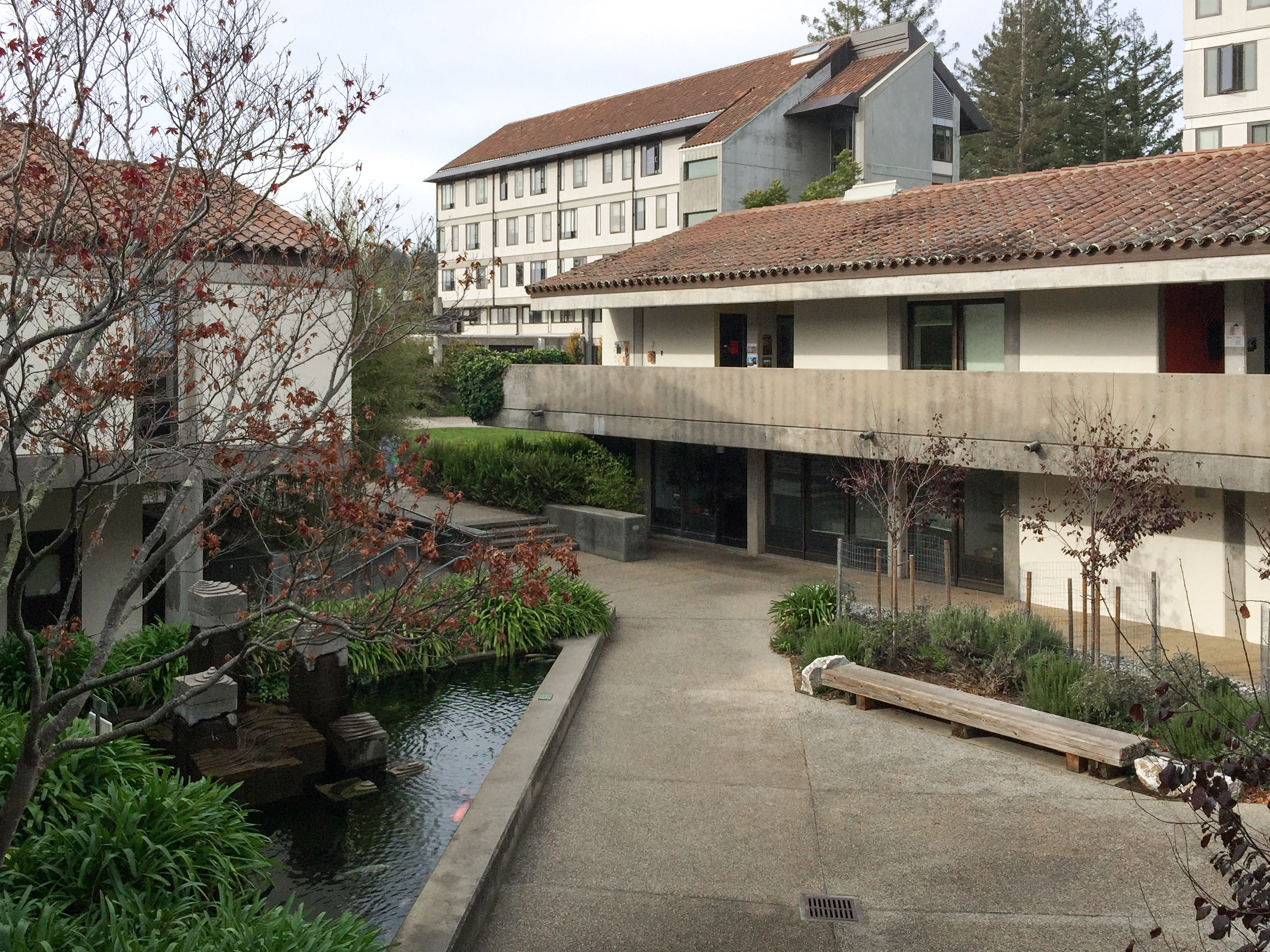
Porter College

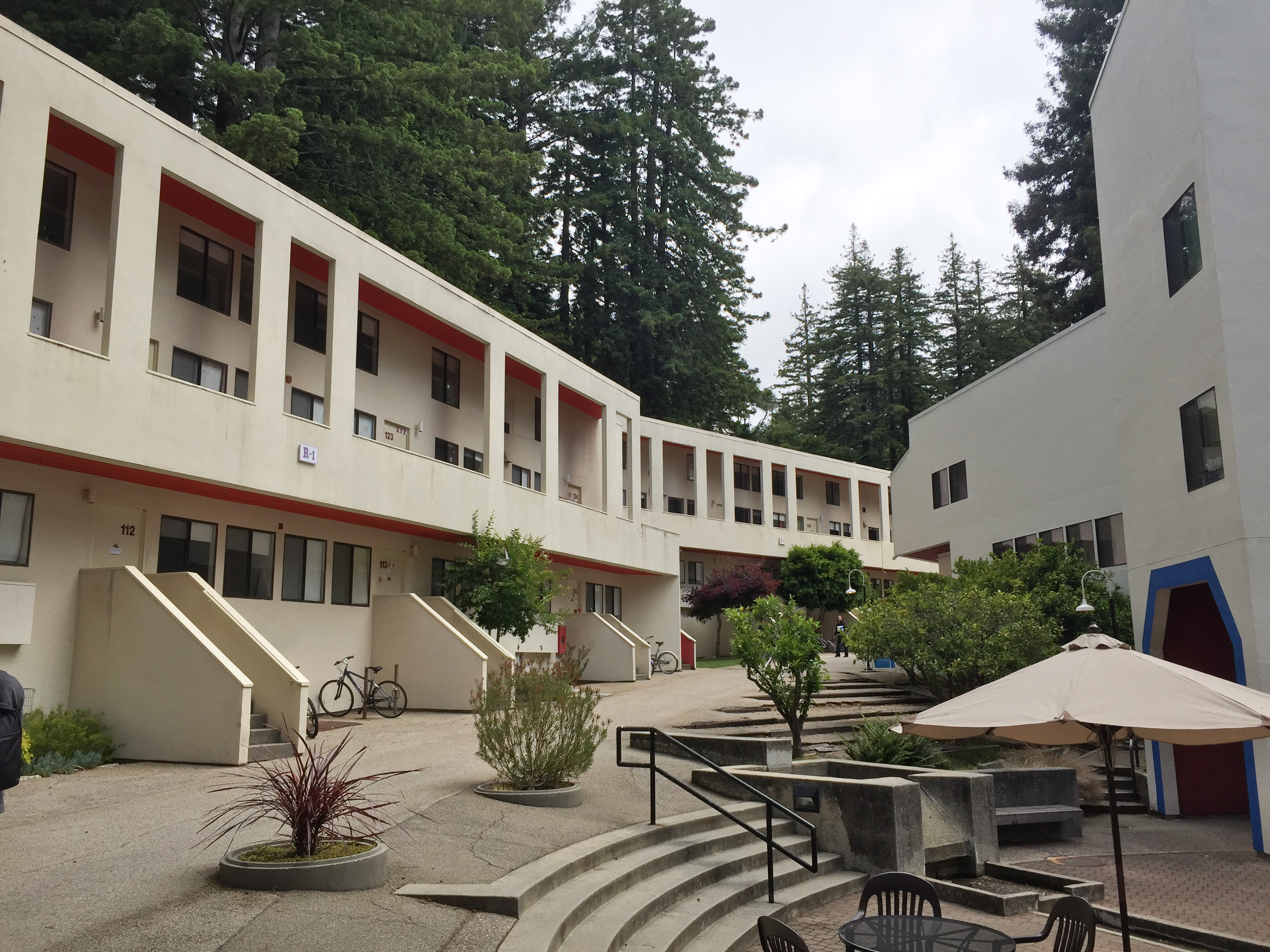
Kresge College

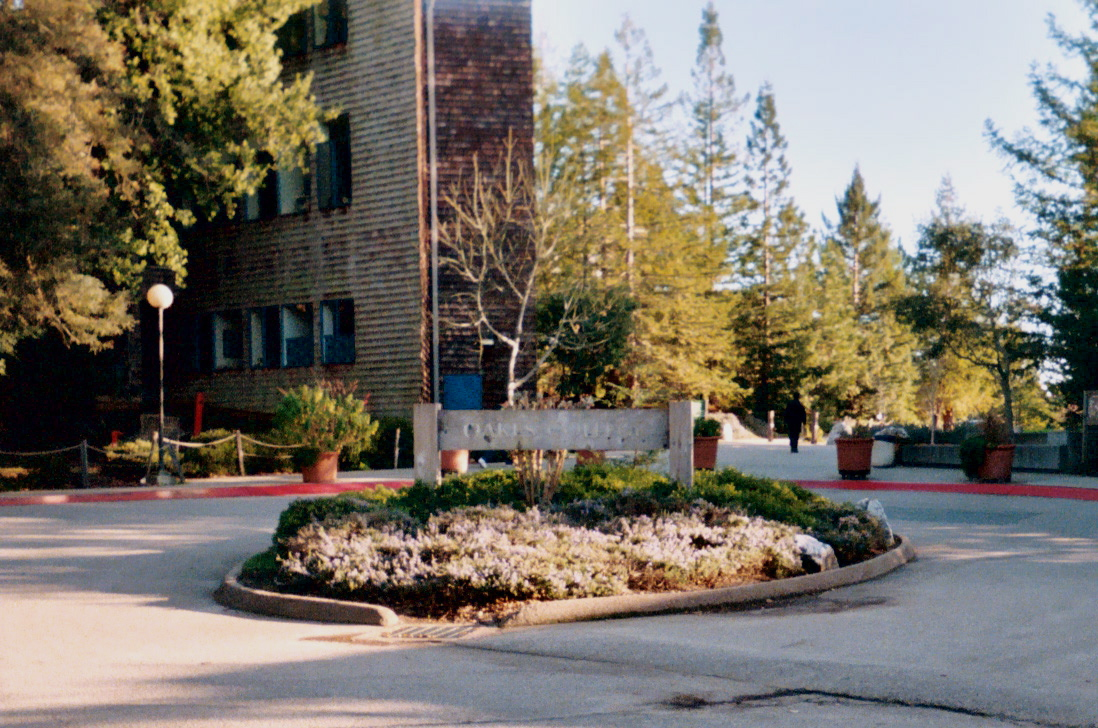
Oakes College

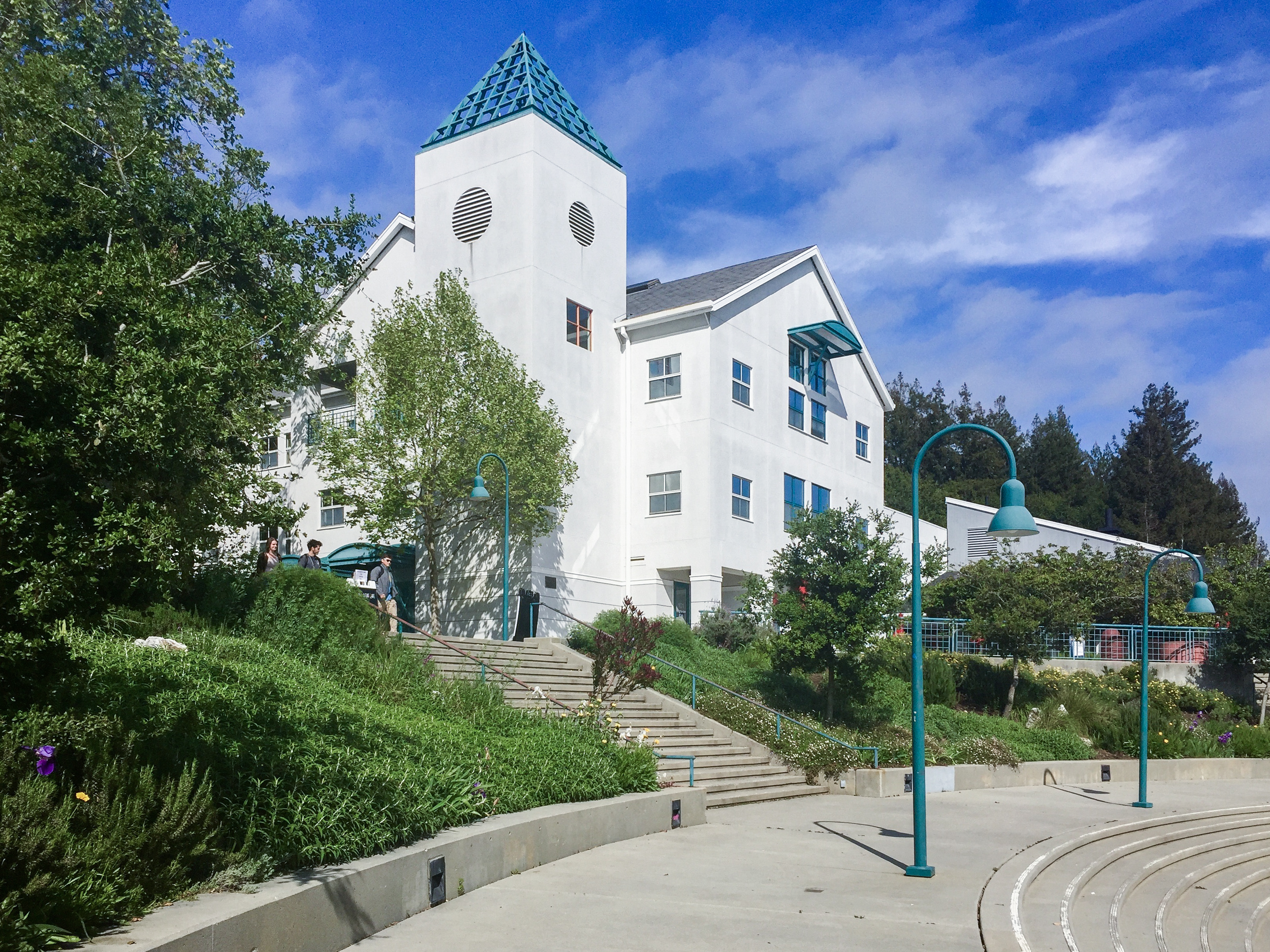
Rachel Carson College

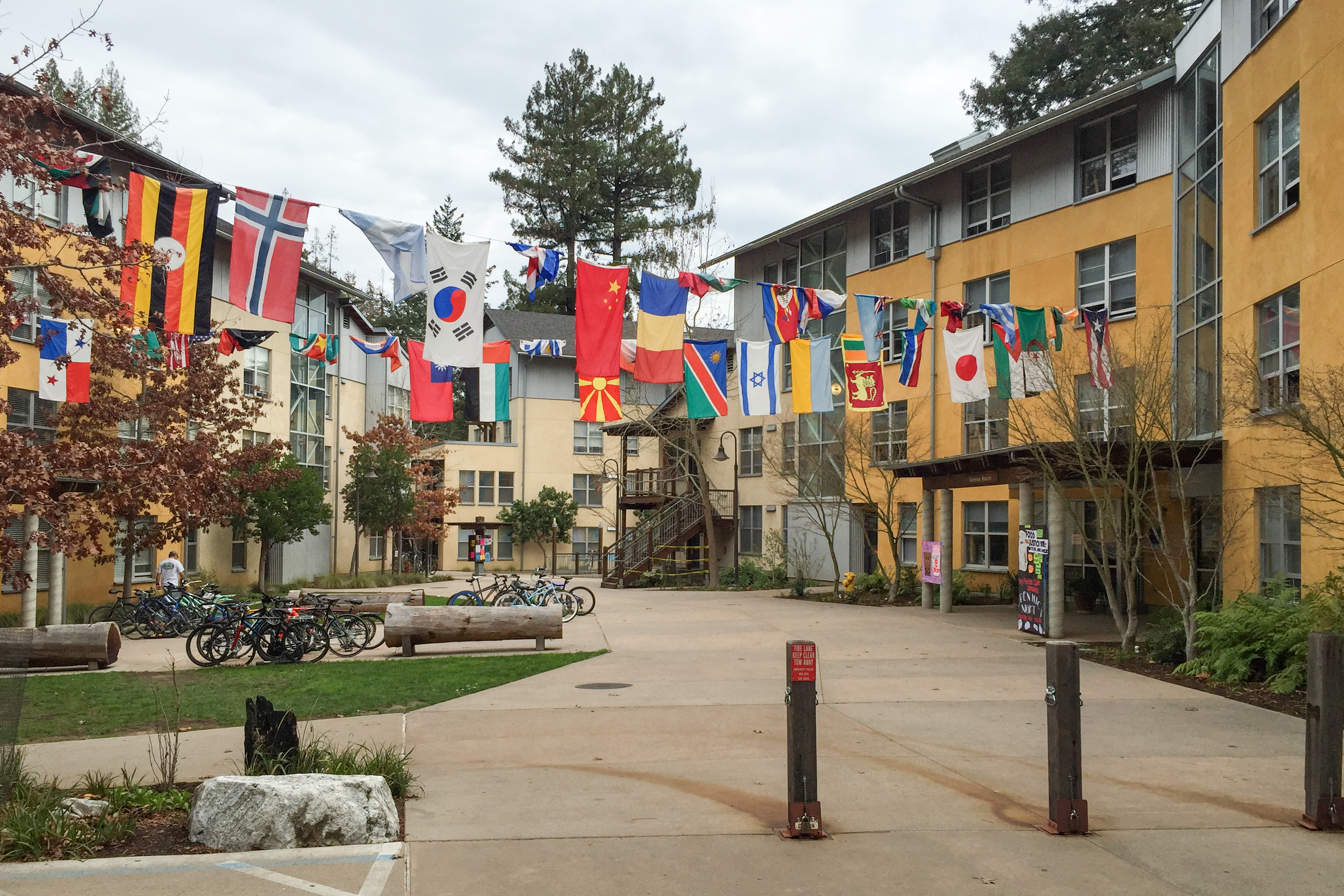
College Nine

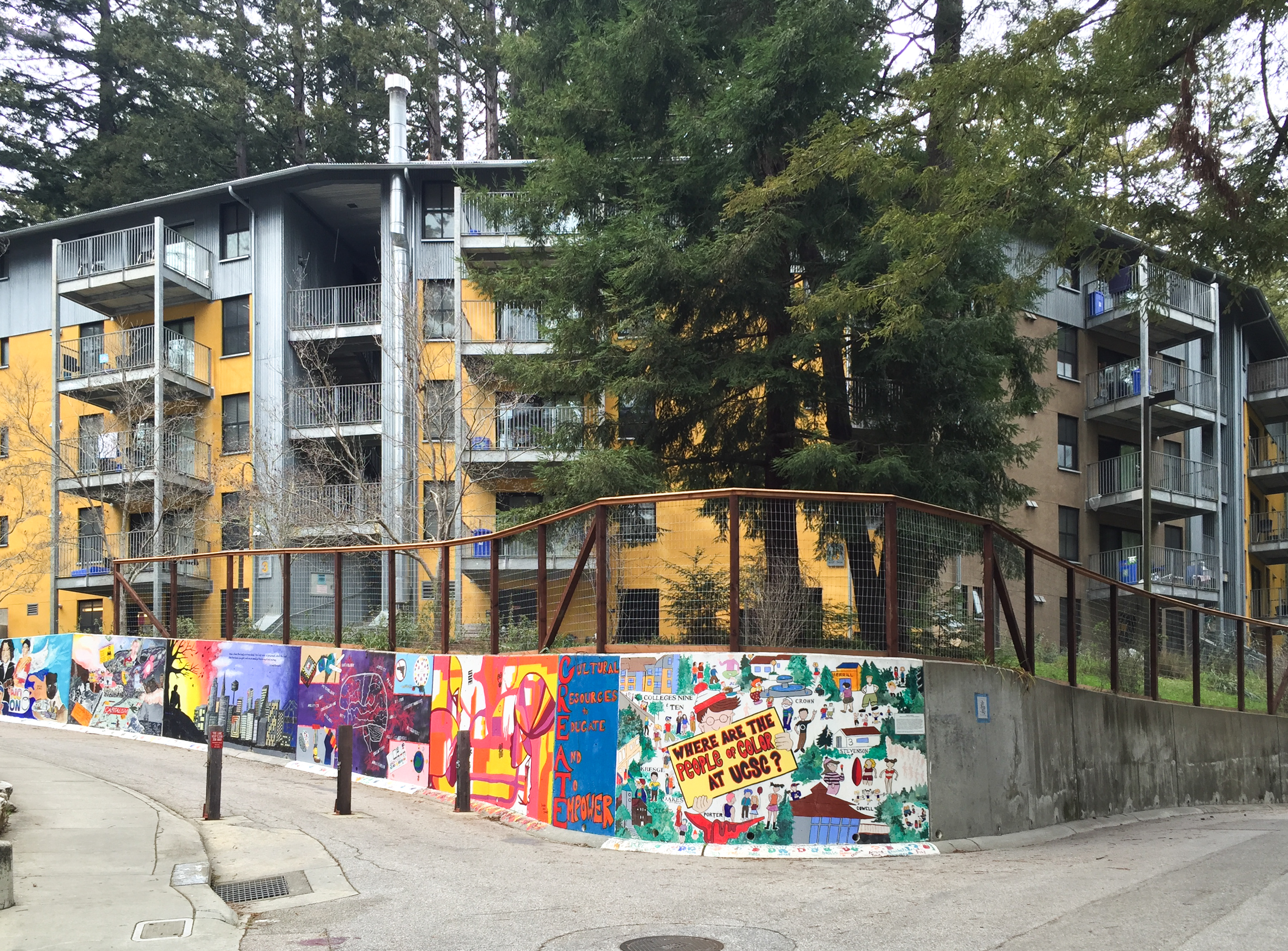
John R. Lewis College

=== Admissions ===
Undergraduate admission statistics
	Fall 2025	Fall 2024	Fall 2023	Fall 2022	Fall 2021
First-time Freshmen
Applicants	66,393	71,722	68,845	66,014	61,805
Admits	48,122	47,186	43,054	30,926	36,252
Admit rate	72%	66%	63%	47%	59%
Enrolled	4,597	4,383	4,381	3,859	4,187
Yield rate	10%	9%	10%	12%	12%
Transfers
Applicants	12,843	12,122	11,168	11,719	13,237
Admits	8,770	7,732	7,162	7,099	7,644
Admit rate	69%	64%	64%	61%	58%
Enrolled	1,321	1,274	1,113	1,212	1,728
Yield rate	15%	16%	16%	17%	23%

For the fall 2024 term, UCSC offered admission to 46,582 freshmen out of 71,700 applicants, an acceptance rate of 65.0%. The entering freshman class had an average high school GPA of 4.01, with the middle 50% range 3.87 to 4.22.

=== Grading ===
For most of its history, UCSC employed a unique student evaluation system. With the exception of the choice of letter grades in science courses the only grades assigned were "pass" and "no record", supplemented with narrative evaluations. Beginning in 1997, UCSC allowed students the option of selecting letter grade evaluations, but course grades were still optional until 2000, when faculty voted to require students receive letter grades. Students were still given narrative evaluations to complement the letter grades. As of 2010, the narrative evaluations were deemed an unnecessary expenditure. Still, some professors write evaluations for all students while some would write evaluations for specific students upon request. Students can still elect to receive a "pass/no pass" grade, but many academic programs limit or even forbid pass/no pass grading. A grade of C and above would receive a grade of "pass". Overall, students may now earn no more than 25% of their UCSC credits on a "pass/no pass" basis. Although the default grading option for almost all courses offered is now "graded", most course grades are still accompanied by written evaluations.

== Library ==
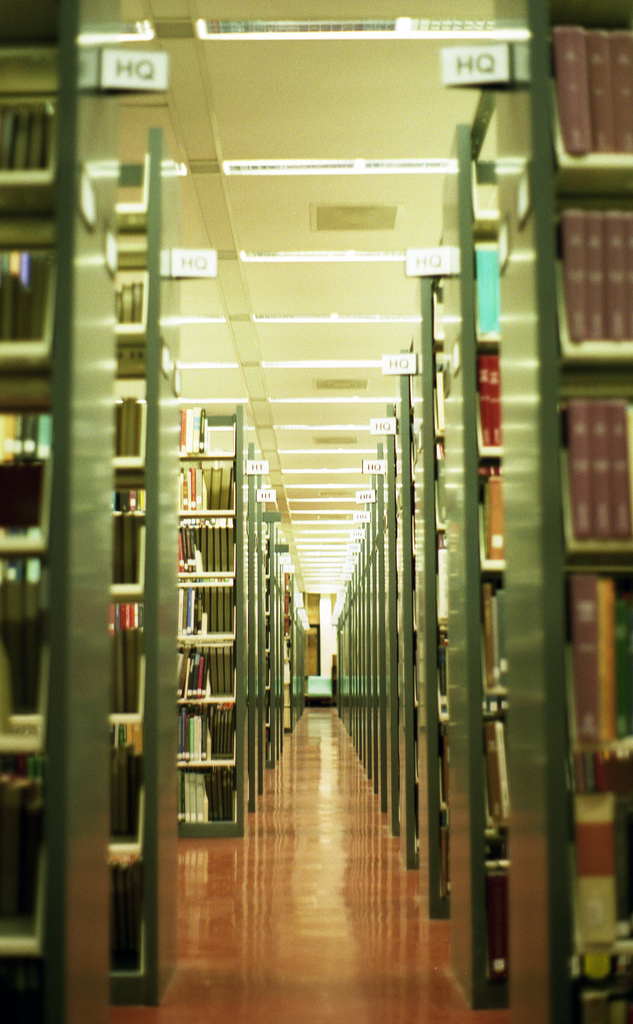
McHenry Library stacks

The McHenry Library houses UCSC's arts and letters collection, with most of the scientific reading at the newer Science and Engineering Library. The McHenry Library was designed by John Carl Warnecke. In addition, the colleges host smaller libraries, which serve as quiet places to study. The McHenry Special Collections Library includes the archives of Robert A. Heinlein, the papers of Anaïs Nin, the papers and drawings of Beat poet Kenneth Patchen, the largest collection of Edward Weston photographs in the United States, the mycology book collection of composer John Cage, a large collection of works by Satyajit Ray, the Hayden White collection of 16th-century Italian printing, a photography collection with nearly half a million items, and the Mary Lea Shane Archives. The Shane Archives contains an extensive collection of photographs, letters, and other documents related to Lick Observatory dating back to 1870.

A 82,000-square-foot (7,600 m^{2}) new addition to the library opened on March 31, 2008, including a "cyber study" room and a Global Village café. The original 144,000-square-foot (13,400 m^{2}) library reopened on June 22, 2011 after seismic upgrades and other renovations. In total, the University Libraries contain over 2.4 million volumes.

=== Grateful Dead archive ===
In 2008, UCSC agreed to house the Grateful Dead archives at the McHenry Library. Exhibits of Grateful Dead Archive materials are on display in the Brittingham Family Foundation's Dead Central Gallery on the 2nd Floor of McHenry Library. The Dead Central exhibit space is open during all library business hours. UCSC plans to devote an entire room at the library, to be called "Dead Central", to display the collection and encourage research. The Grateful Dead Archive represents one of the most significant popular culture collections of the 20th Century and documents the band's activity and influence in contemporary music from 1965 to 1995. UCSC beat out petitions from Stanford and UC Berkeley to house the archives. Grateful Dead guitarist Bob Weir said that UCSC is "a seat of neo-Bohemian culture that we're a facet of. There could not have been a cozier place for this collection to land." The archive became open to the public July 29, 2012.

== Student life ==
Most undergraduates are from California. The following tables show the ethnic and regional breakdown of the student body:

Regional Origin of 2024 Freshmen	Percent
San Francisco Bay Area	29.7%
Los Angeles/Orange County/South Coast	23.7%
Monterey Bay/Santa Clara Valley/Silicon Valley	12.7%
Central Valley Area	12.9%
San Diego/Inland Empire	11.1%
Other States in the U.S	5.1%
International	3.0%
Other Northern California	1.8%

Undergraduate demographics as of Fall 2023
Race and ethnicity	Total
White	31%
Hispanic	28%
Asian	25%
Two or more races	9%
Foreign national	3%
Unknown	2%
Black	2%
Economic diversity
Low-income (Note: The percentage of students who received an income-based federal Pell grant intended for low-income students.)	32%
Non low-income (Note: The percentage of students not receiving an income-based federal Pell grant intended for low-income students.)	68%

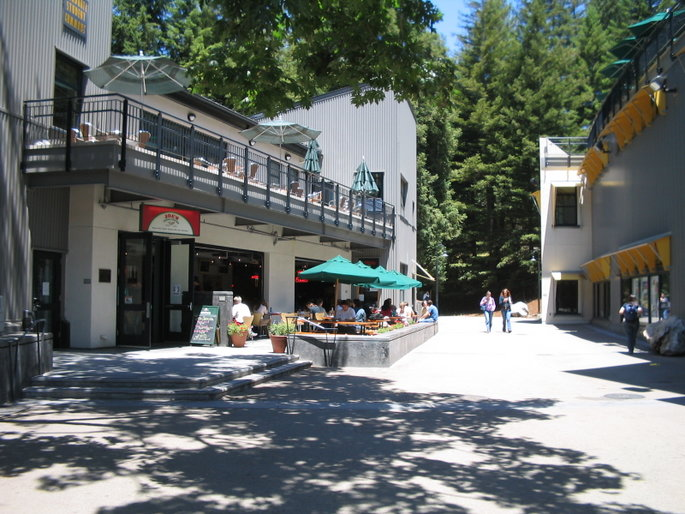
Quarry Plaza

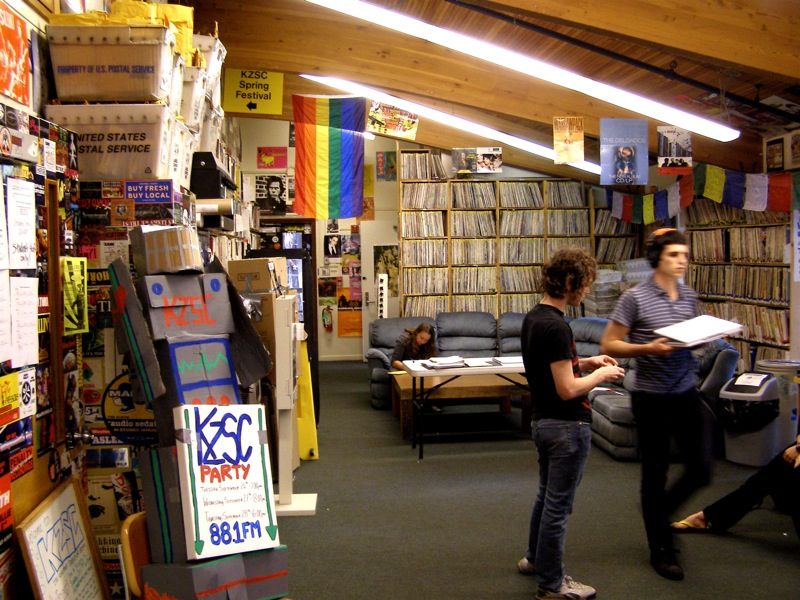
KZSC lounge

UCSC students are known for political activism. In 2005, a Pentagon surveillance program deemed student opposition to military recruiters on campus a "credible threat", the only campus antiwar action to receive the designation. In February 2006, Chancellor Denice Denton got the designation removed. Military recruiters declined to return to UCSC the following year, but returned in 2008 to a more low-keyed student reception and protests using elements of guerrilla theatre, rather than vandalism or physical violence. Thanks to students passing a $3 quarterly tuition increase to support buying renewable energy in 2006, UCSC is the sixth-largest buyer of renewable energy among college campuses nationwide. The Cesar Chavez Convocation is another example of student activism.

UC Santa Cruz is also well known for its cannabis culture. On April 20, 2007, approximately 2,000 UCSC students gathered at Porter Meadow to celebrate the annual "420". Students and others openly smoked marijuana while campus police stood by. The once student-only event has grown since the city of Santa Cruz passed Measure K in 2006, an ordinance making marijuana use a low-priority crime for police. The 2007 event attracted a total of 5,000 participants. The university does not condone the gathering, but has taken steps to regulate the event and ensure security for all participants. On April 20, 2010, the school administration shut down the west entrance to campus and limited the number of buses that could drive through campus. On April 20, 2013, a student by the name of Gennady Tsarinsky was arrested for the possession of more than one ounce. Although a UCSC spokesperson could not confirm the exact weight of the joint possessed by Tsarinsky, it was estimated to be nearly three pounds.

Another well known tradition is what is known as "First Rain". Students run around campus naked or nearly naked to celebrate the school year's first night of heavy rain. The run begins at Porter and proceeds through all the other colleges, collecting more students in its parade.

=== Student government ===
The Student Union Assembly was founded in 1985 to better coordinate bargaining positions between students and administration on campus-wide issues. All the residential colleges and six ethnic and gender-based organizations send delegates to SUA.

=== Student organizations ===
UCSC has around 200 recognized student organizations. These cover a wide variety of subjects and are registered to one of 12 focus areas, including religious, service, cultural, general interest, and academic.

=== Student media ===
All student media organizations are funded by a student council referendum of $3.20 per student per quarter.

- City on a Hill Press, a weekly publication that serves as the traditional campus newspaper
- Fish Rap Live!, the alternative, comedic paper
- TWANAS, the Third World and Native American Student Press Collective publishes issues about every quarter for various communities of color at UCSC. Its peak years were the 1970s, 1980s and 1990s.
- Student Cable Television (SCTV) disbanded at the beginning of the 2010 academic school year. On The Spot (OTS) replaced the defunct SCTV organization, continuing the student-run television opportunities. On The Spot airs on channel 28, only on campus.
- The Moxie Production Group
- The Project, a quarterly paper, for UCSC's radical community
- The Disorientation Guide, published on sporadic years, introduces new students to UCSC's radical history and various political issues that face the campus and community.
- Rapt Magazine, a quarterly literary and arts magazine
- Leviathan Jewish Journal, a Jewish student life publication
- On the Spot, a student-run broadcast media organization, produces a variety of shows including Press Center Live (sketch comedy), ART (music videos), and game shows.
- Banana Slug News, a television broadcast news program
- Chinquapin, a journal sponsored by the creative writing department
- Gaia Magazine, a magazine about environmental and sustainability subjects that is published once a year
- Red Wheelbarrow, a "literary arts" journal
- Matchbox Magazine, an annual humanities publication, started at UCSC, that operates across many UC campuses
- EyeCandy, an annual student-run film journal associated with the Film and Digital Media department
- KZSC, the student-run campus radio station
- Santa Cruz Indymedia, a local activist resource with a lot of UCSC content
- The Film Production Coalition, which produces films on a quarterly basis

=== Housing ===
9% of students in 2021 reported that they lack stable housing. UCSC continues to increase enrollment each year despite a lack of campus housing, leading to more students living off-campus and driving up rental prices in Santa Cruz. On February 22, 2022, the city filed a lawsuit against UCSC claiming that the university's Long Range Development Plan and Environmental Impact Report do not account for a situation in which the university increases its student population without fulfilling its promise to double its campus housing capacity.

=== Greek life ===
Greek life at UCSC includes, among other fraternities and sororities, Delta Lambda Psi, the nation's first gender-neutral queer Greek organization.

== Sustainability ==
Students established the Student Environmental Center (SEC) in 2001, have held annual Earth Summits, and established a sustainability funding body, the Campus Sustainability Council. In 2004, the UC Policy on Sustainable Practices was released, stating that the University of California Office of the President was committed to minimizing its impact on the environment and reducing its dependence on non-renewable energy. In 2006, a Committee on Sustainability and Stewardship (CSS) was established and a campus-wide Sustainability Assessment was completed. The following year, the pilot Sustainability Office was created to help institutionalize sustainability, coordinate communication and collaboration between the many entities already engaged in campus sustainability activities at UCSC, support policy implementation, and serve as a resource for the campus.

== Athletics ==
UCSC competes in Division III of the NCAA, mainly as a member of the Coast to Coast Athletic Conference (C2C). There are fifteen varsity sports – men's and women's basketball, tennis, soccer, volleyball, swimming, cross country and diving, and women's golf. UCSC teams have been Division I nationally ranked in tennis, cross country, soccer, men's volleyball, and swimming. The men's water polo team was ranked 18th in the nation in 2006 and won the D3 national Championship, but in 2009 the team was discontinued due to budget cuts. UCSC maintains a number of club teams. It has won several club national championships in men's tennis, three in men's water polo and also a women's Division I championship in club rugby.

Due to mounting debt resulting from UCSC's athletic program, UCSC polled its students in 2016 on whether they would consider approving a quarterly fee that would support athletic operations. After polling showed support for a potential fee, a measure to introduce a quarterly fee passed in 2017 with 79% of voting students in favor.

== Administrators ==
=== List of chancellors ===
No.	Image	Chancellor	Term start	Term end	Refs.
1		Dean McHenry	July 1, 1961	June 30,1974	
2		Mark N. Christensen	July 1, 1974	January 23, 1976	
acting		Angus Ellis Taylor	February 1976	September 1976	
3		Angus Ellis Taylor	September 1976	June 1977	
4		Robert L. Sinsheimer	September 1, 1977	June 30, 1987	
5		Robert B. Stevens	July 1, 1987	July 31, 1991	
interim		Karl S. Pister	August 1, 1991	March 1992	
6		Karl S. Pister	March 1992	June 30, 1996	
7		M. R. C. Greenwood	July 1, 1996	March 31, 2004	
8		Martin M. Chemers (Note: Although Chemers is labeled as an "interim" or "acting" chancellor during his administration, Chemers appears to be considered to be the 8th "full" chancellor after his administration even though there is a lack of evidence that the UC Board of Trustees had retroactively made such an appointment.)	April 1, 2004	February 13, 2005	
9		Denice Denton	February 14, 2005	June 24, 2006 (Note: Died in office.)	
acting		George R. Blumenthal	July 14, 2006	September 19, 2007	
10		George R. Blumenthal	September 19, 2007	June 30, 2019	
11		Cynthia Larive	July 1, 2019	present	

Table notes:

== Notable alumni and faculty ==
Notable alumni of the University of California, Santa Cruz include co-founder of the Black Panther Party Huey P. Newton (BA 1974, PhD 1980), actress and comedian Maya Rudolph (BA 1995), founder of Huffington Post and BuzzFeed Jonah Peretti (BA 1996), filmmaker Cary Fukunaga (BA 1999), marine biologist and MacArthur Fellowship winner Stacy Jupiter (PhD 2006), acclaimed author and cultural theorist bell hooks (PhD 1983), author Geoffrey Dunn; musician Still Woozy (BA 2015), and several Pulitzer Prize-winning journalists. Notable attendees include actor and comedian Andy Samberg, New York Times commentator Ezra Klein, and filmmaker Miranda July.

Notable UC Santa Cruz alumni include:

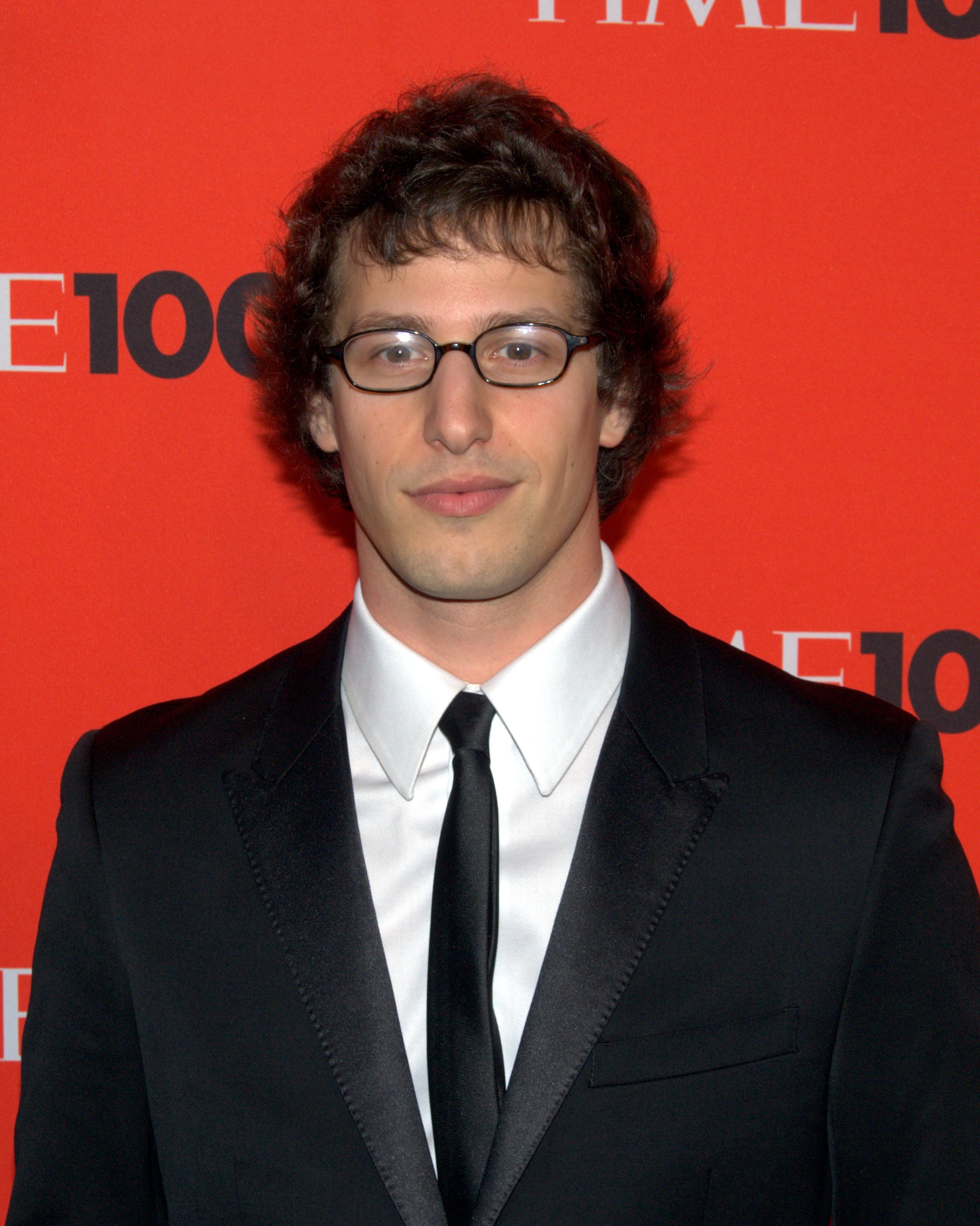
Andy Samberg, actor, comedian, and musician

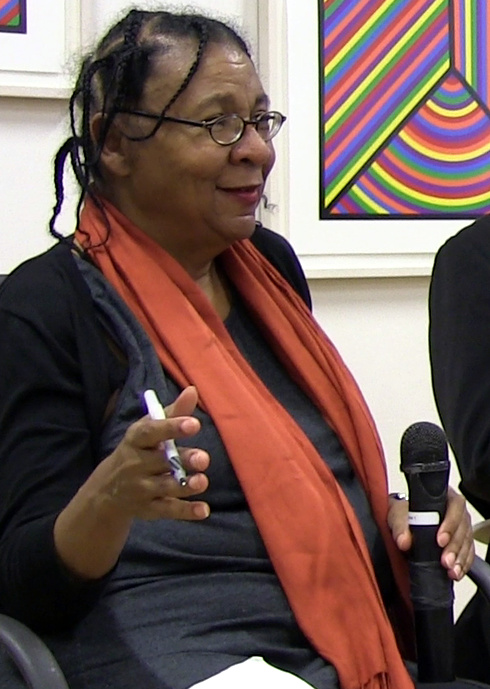
bell hooks, critically acclaimed author and cultural theorist, leading public intellectual

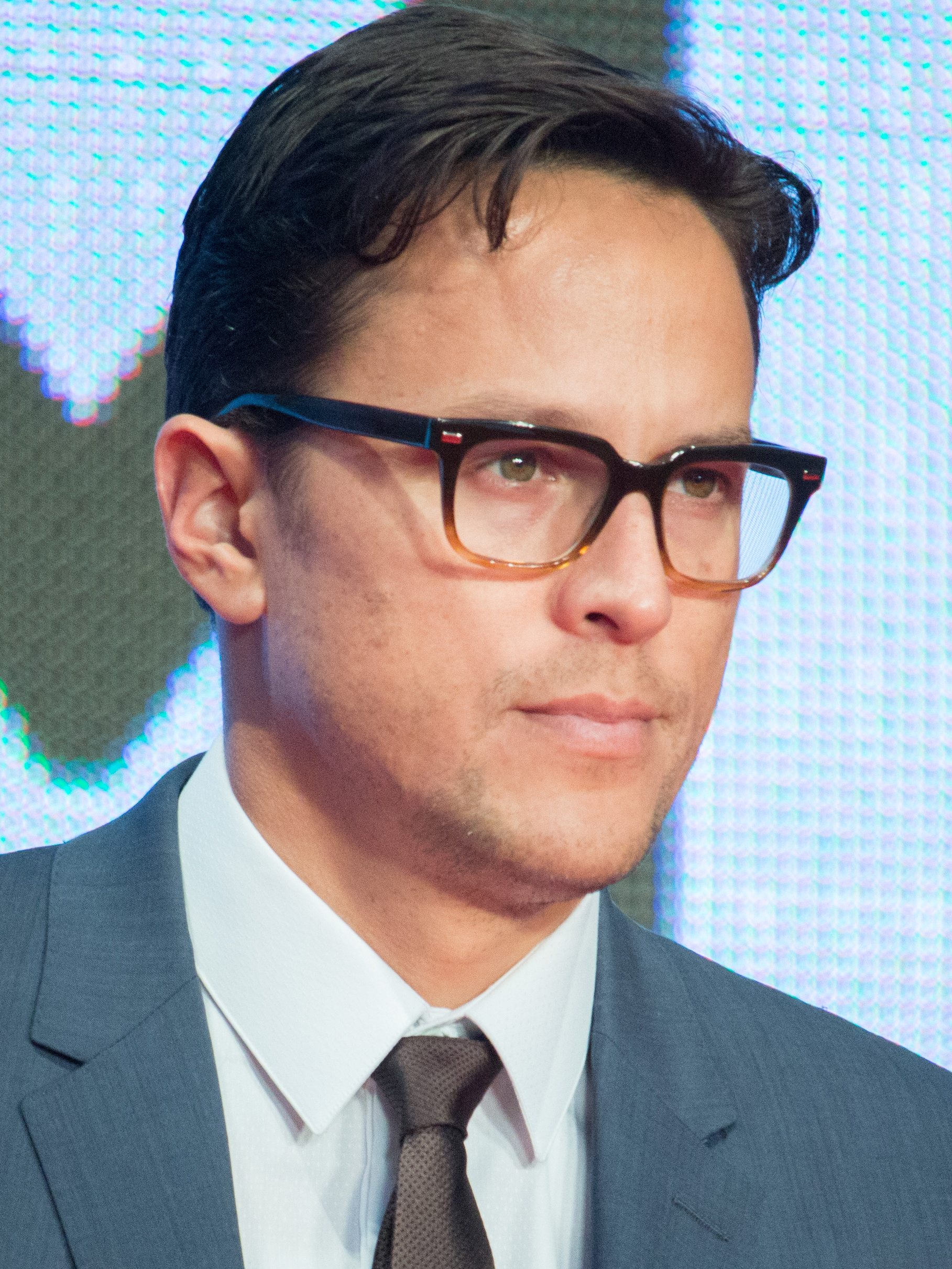
Cary Fukunaga, film director, writer, and cinematographer

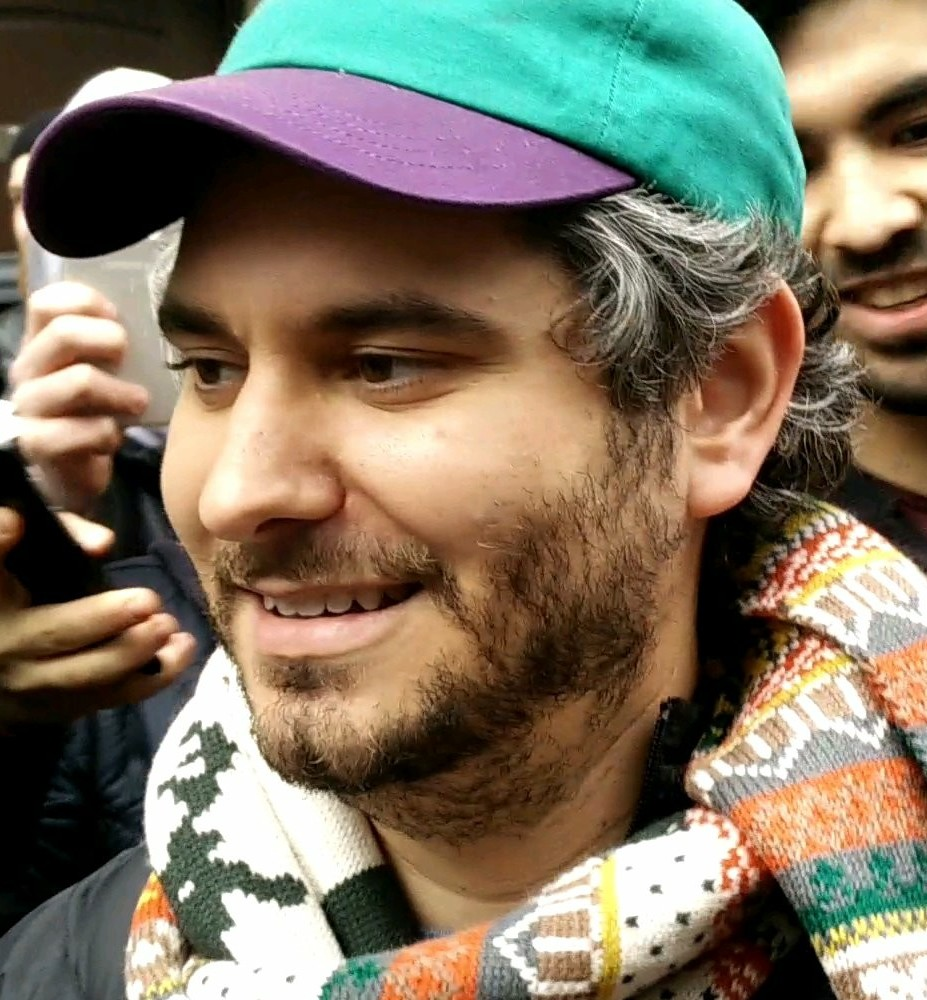
Ethan Klein, YouTuber, comedian, podcaster, and Internet personality

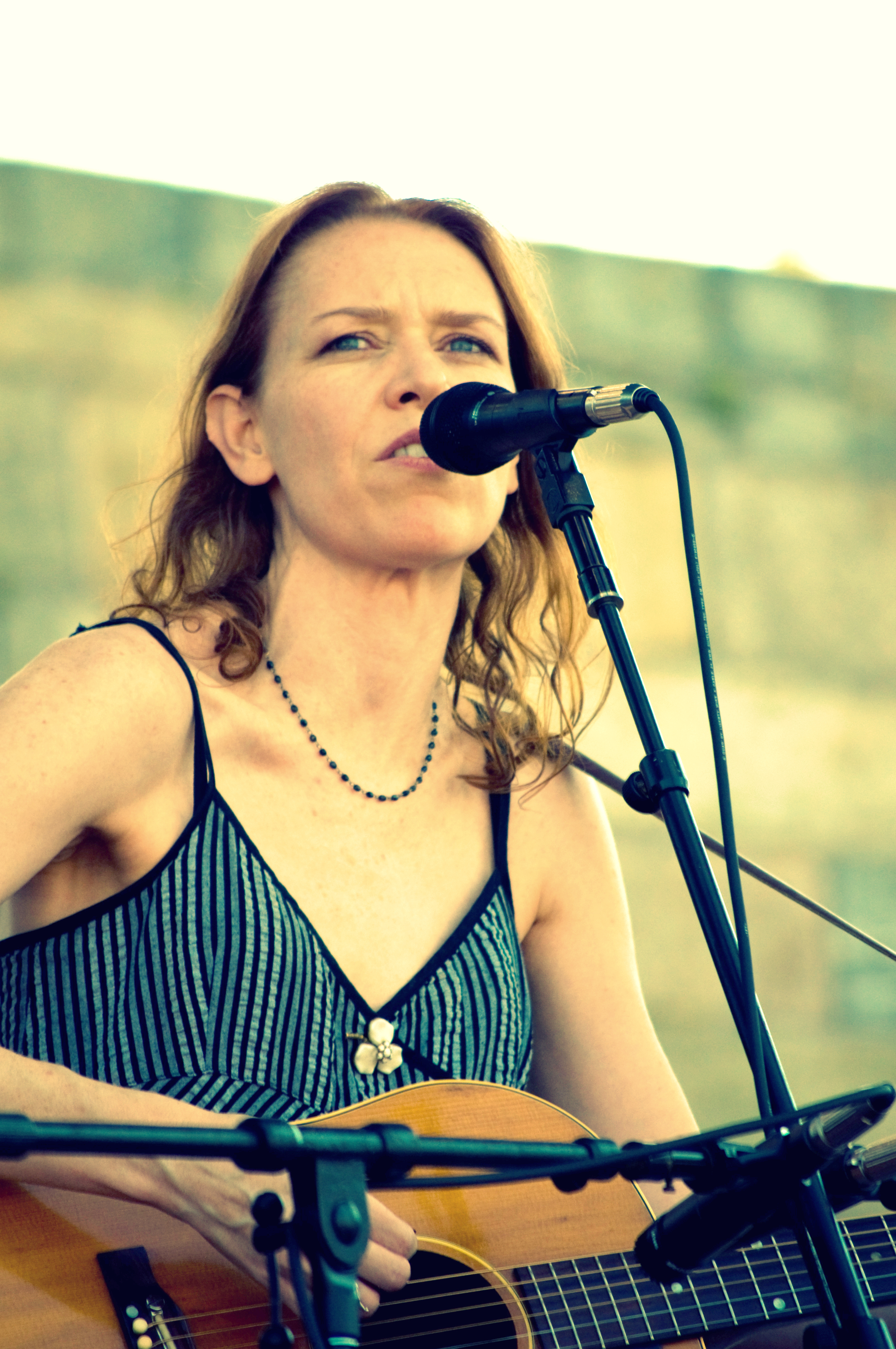
Gillian Welch, singer and songwriter

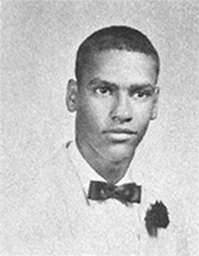
Huey P. Newton, political activist, revolutionary, and co-founder of the Black Panther Party

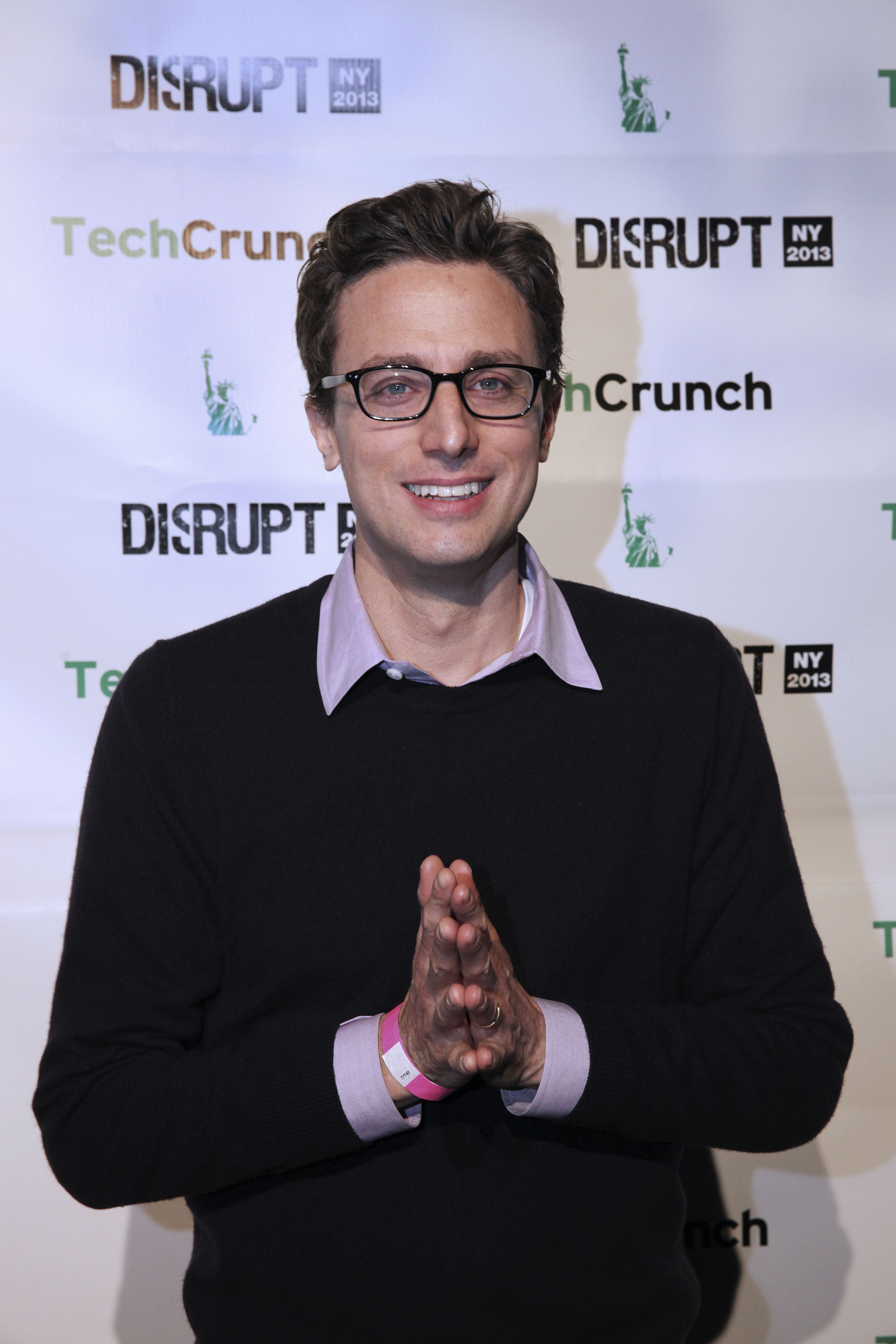
Jonah Peretti, founder of Huffington Post and BuzzFeed

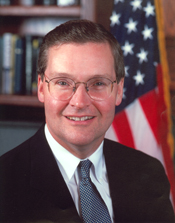
John Doolittle, former member of the United States House of Representatives

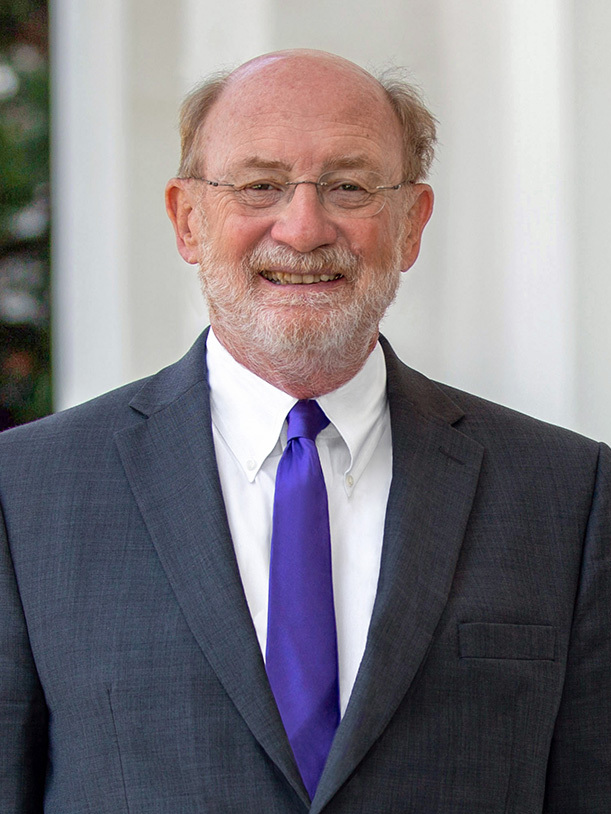
John Laird, former mayor of Santa Cruz and Secretary of the California Natural Resources Agency, and current California state senator

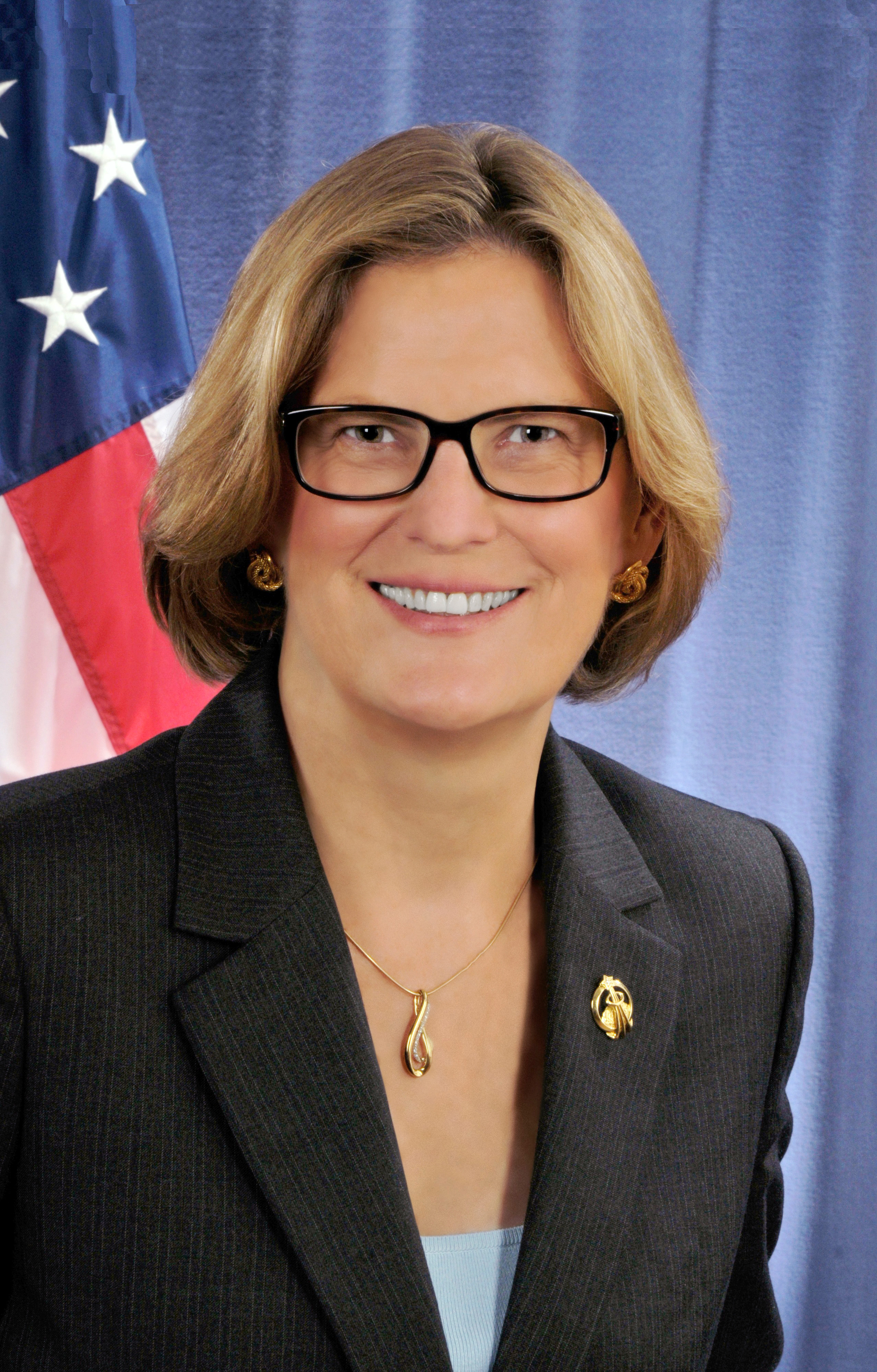
Kathryn D. Sullivan, astronaut and former NOAA Administrator

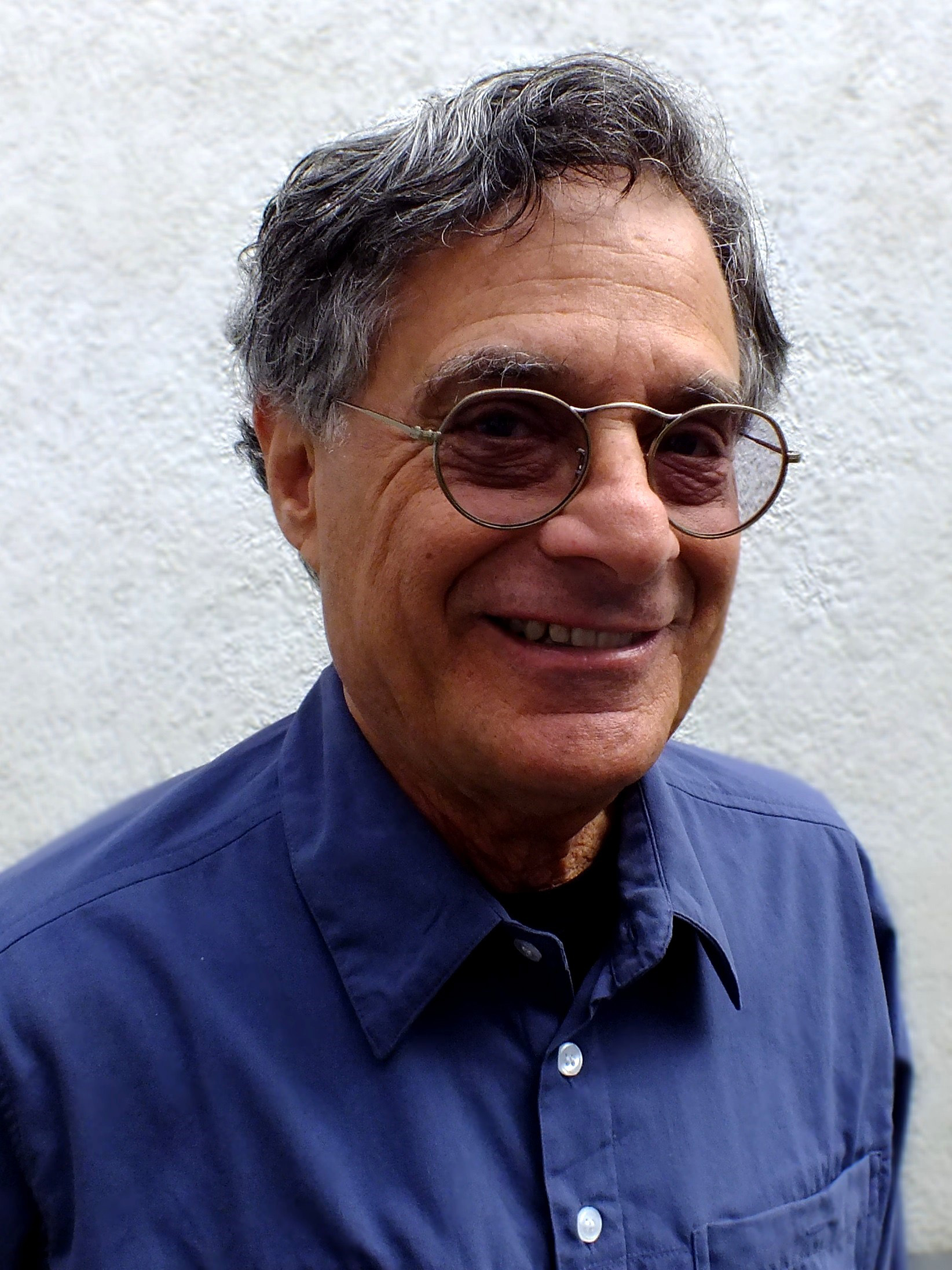
Marc Okrand, linguist and creator of the Klingon language from Star Trek

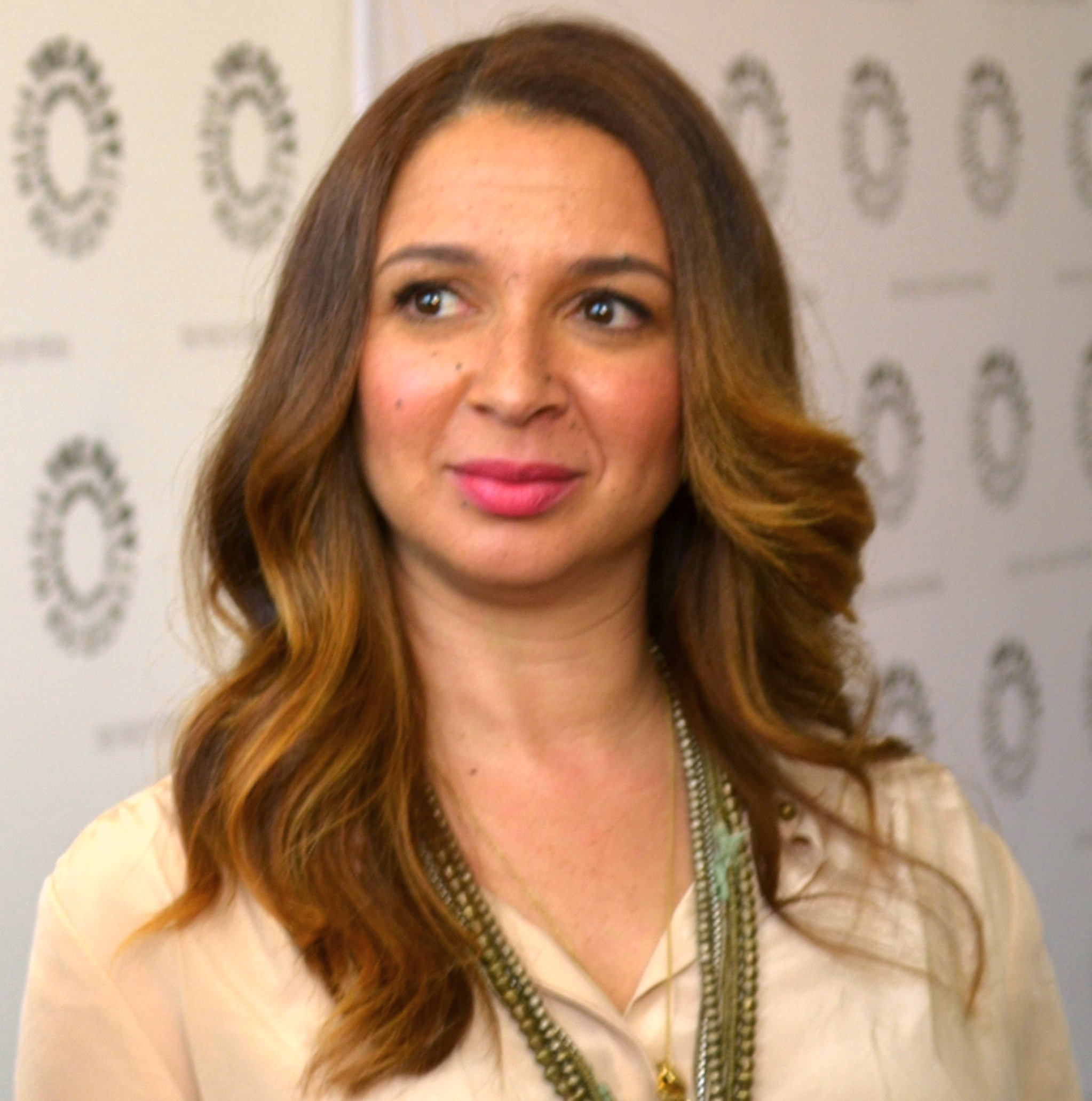
Maya Rudolph, actress and comedian

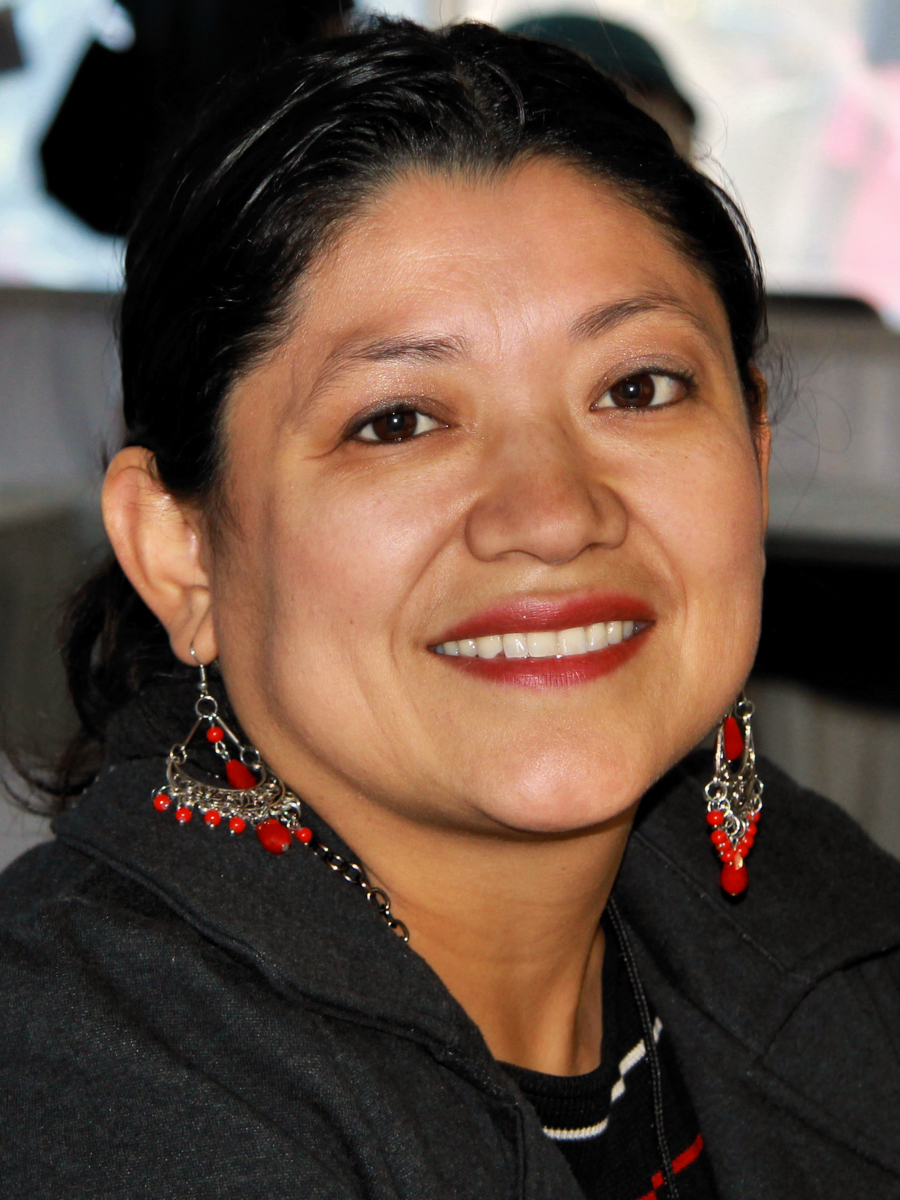
Reyna Grande, Mexican author

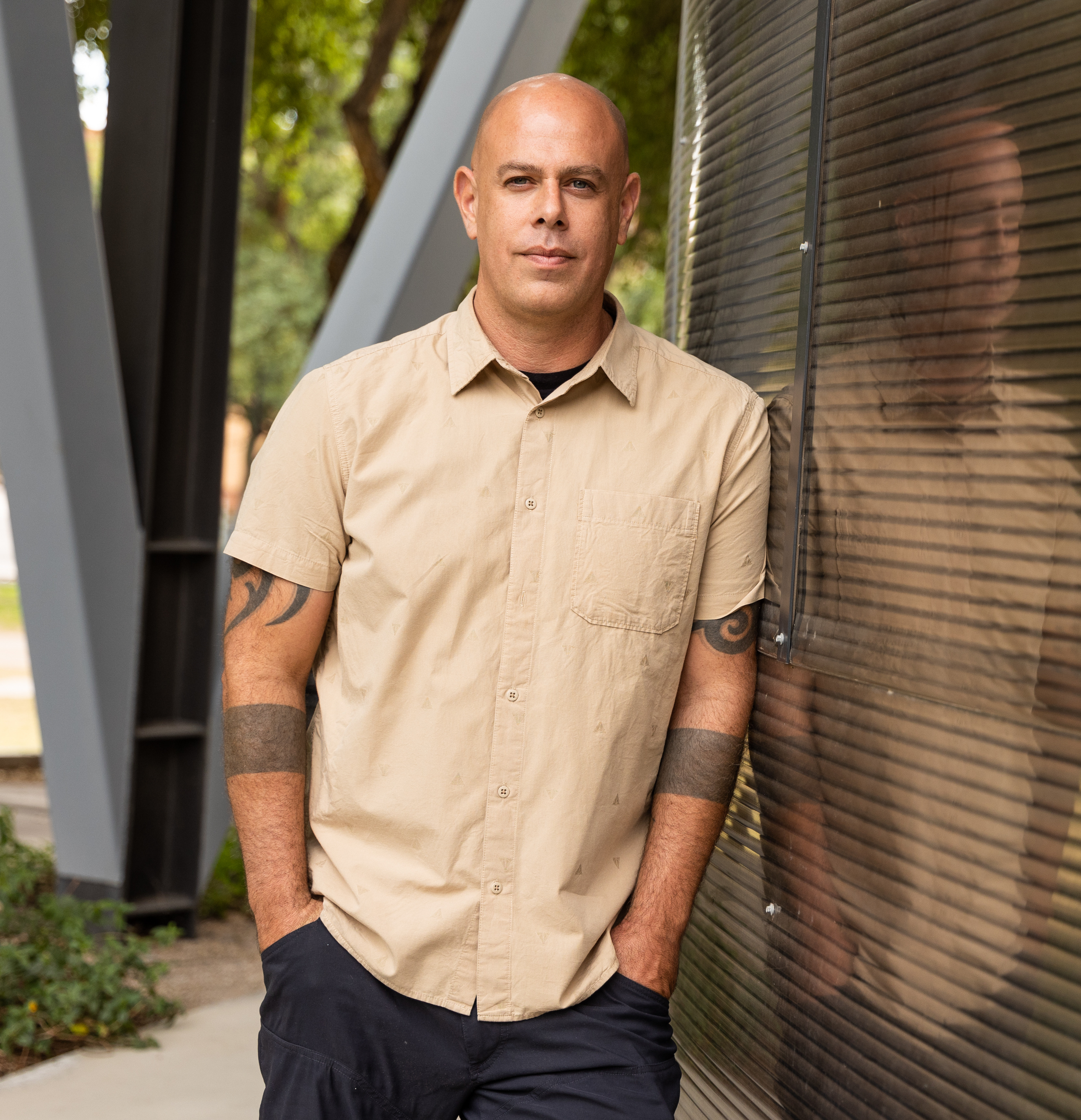
Stefano Bloch, academic, graffiti artist, and author

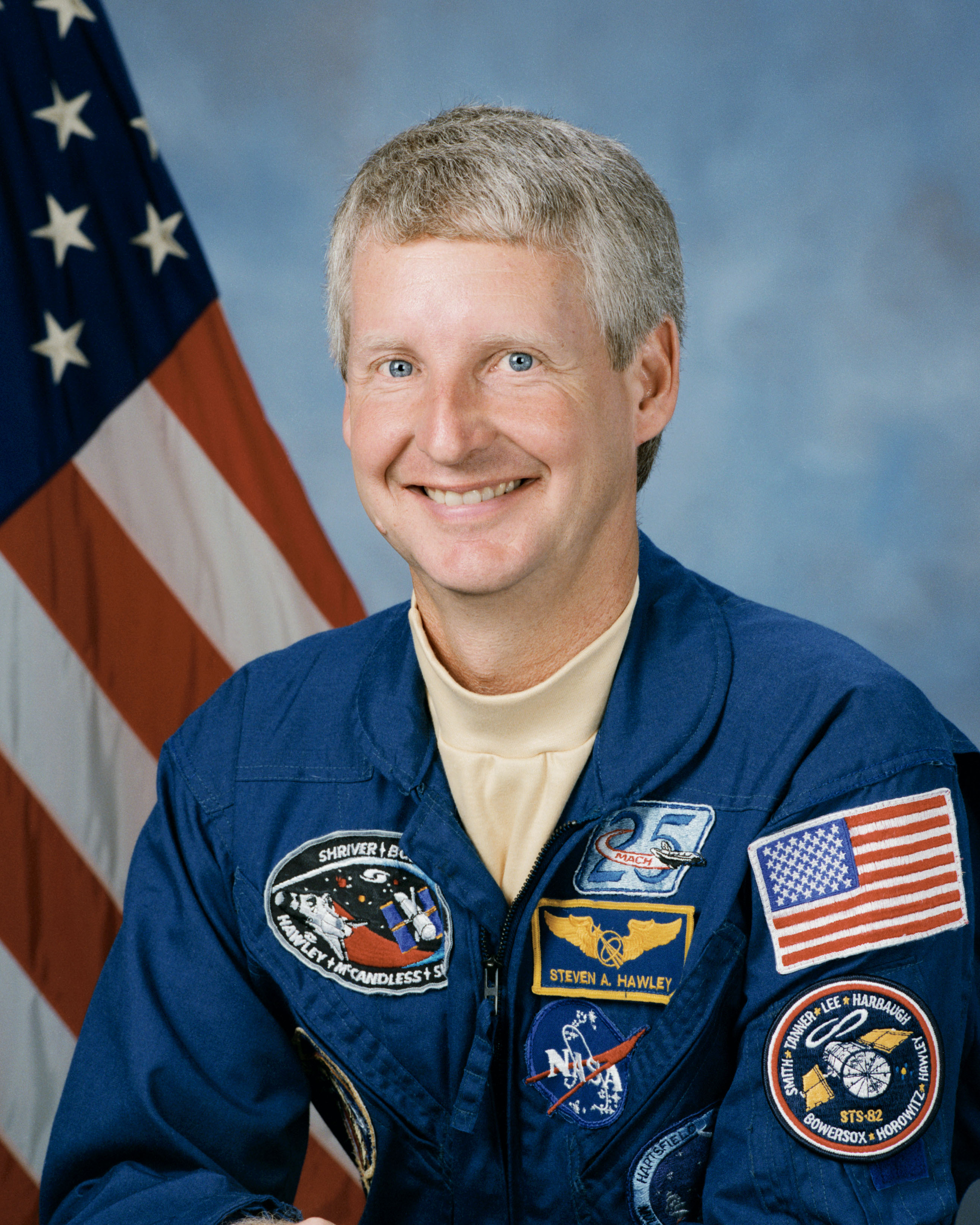
Steven Hawley, astronaut and professor at the University of Kansas

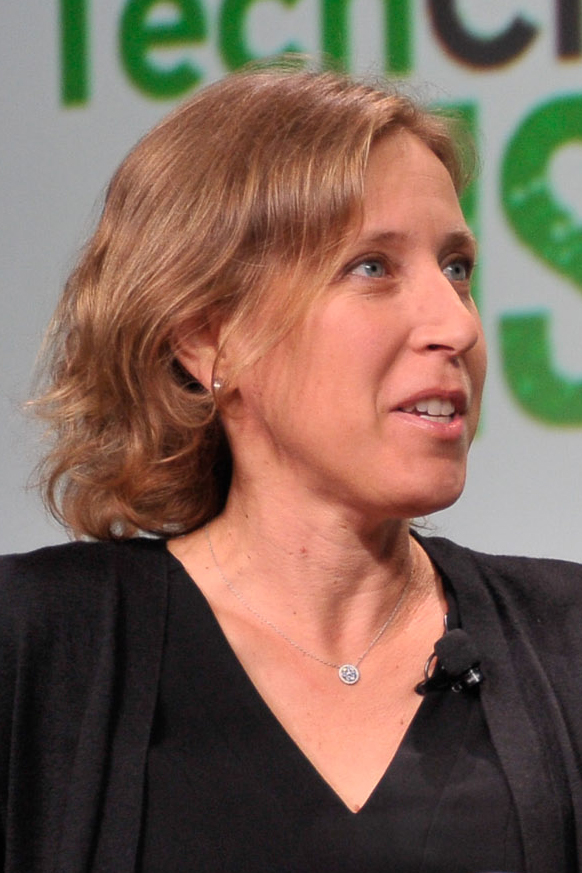
Susan Wojcicki, former CEO of YouTube

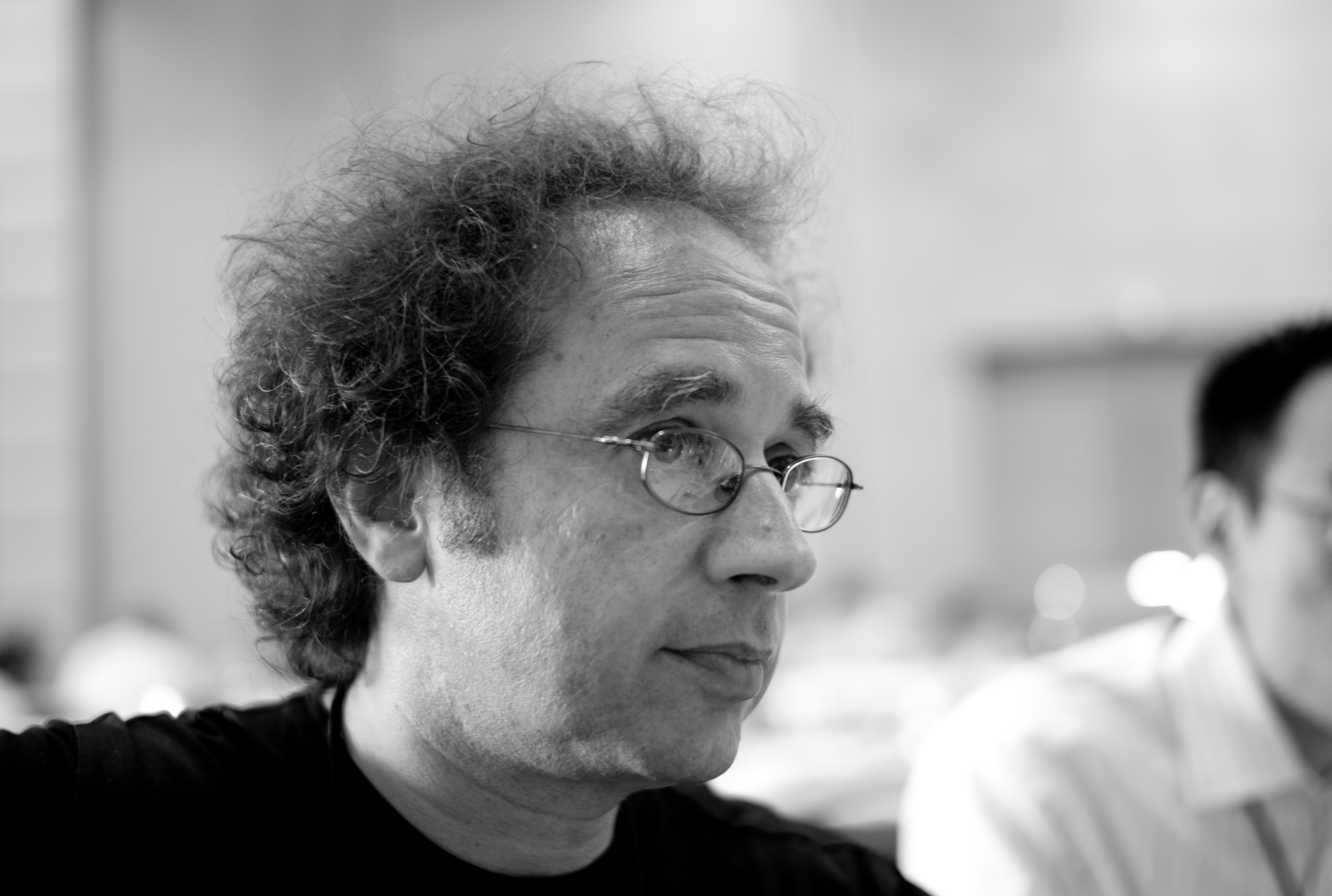
Tod Machover, composer and professor at MIT Media Lab

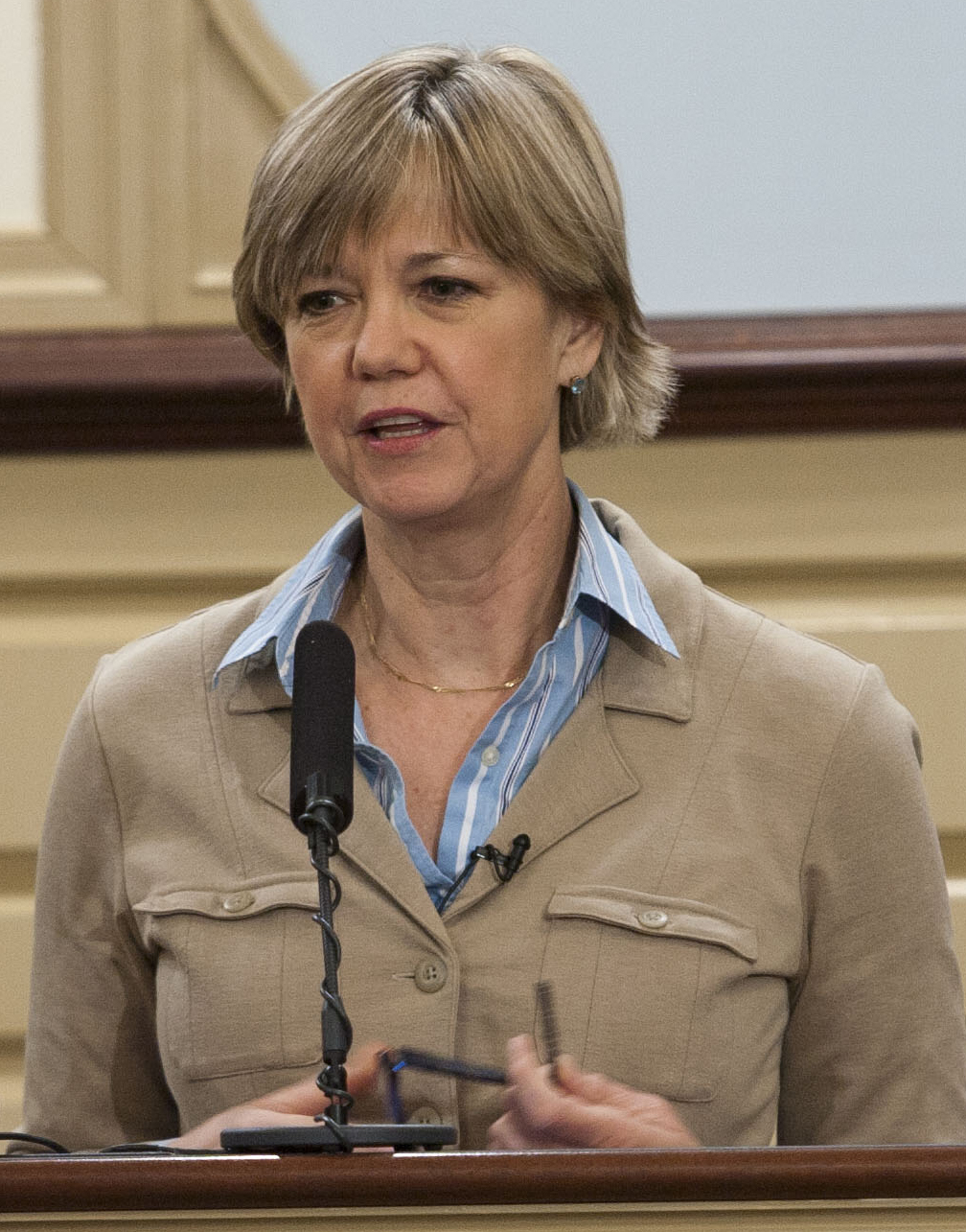
Dana Priest, Washington Post reporter, author, and winner of two Pulitzer Prizes

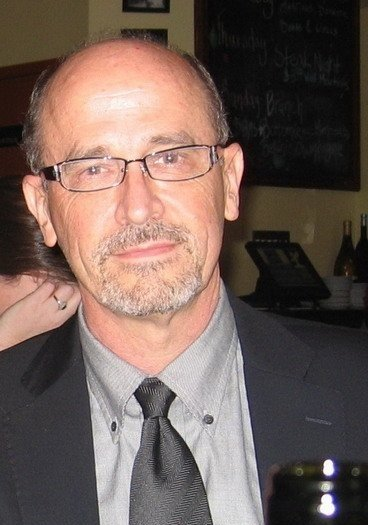
Nicholas B. Suntzeff, cosmologist, professor of astronomy, and co-founder of the High-Z Supernova Search Team, which discovered dark energy
Notable UC Santa Cruz faculty include:

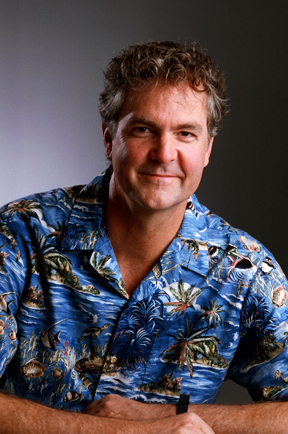
David Haussler, professor of biomolecular engineering and director of the Genomics Institute at UC Santa Cruz

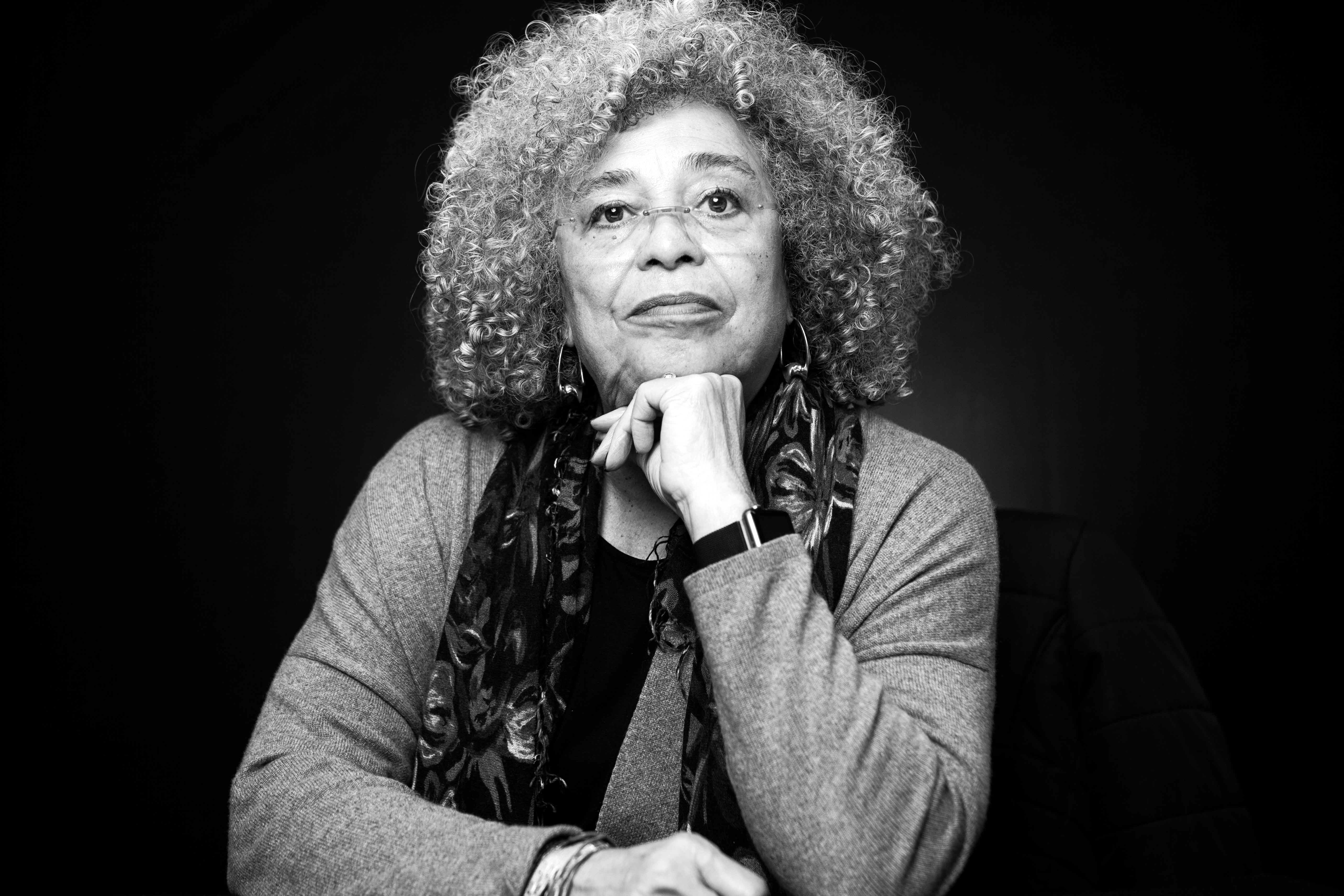
Angela Davis, distinguished professor emerita of History of Consciousness, Communist Party vice presidential candidate twice

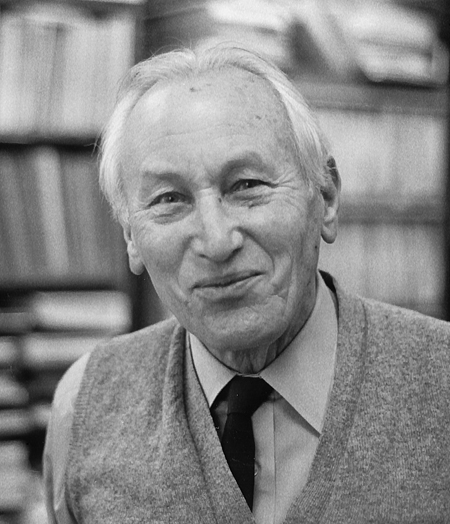
Kenneth V. Thimann, plant physiologist and microbiologist, first provost of Crown College

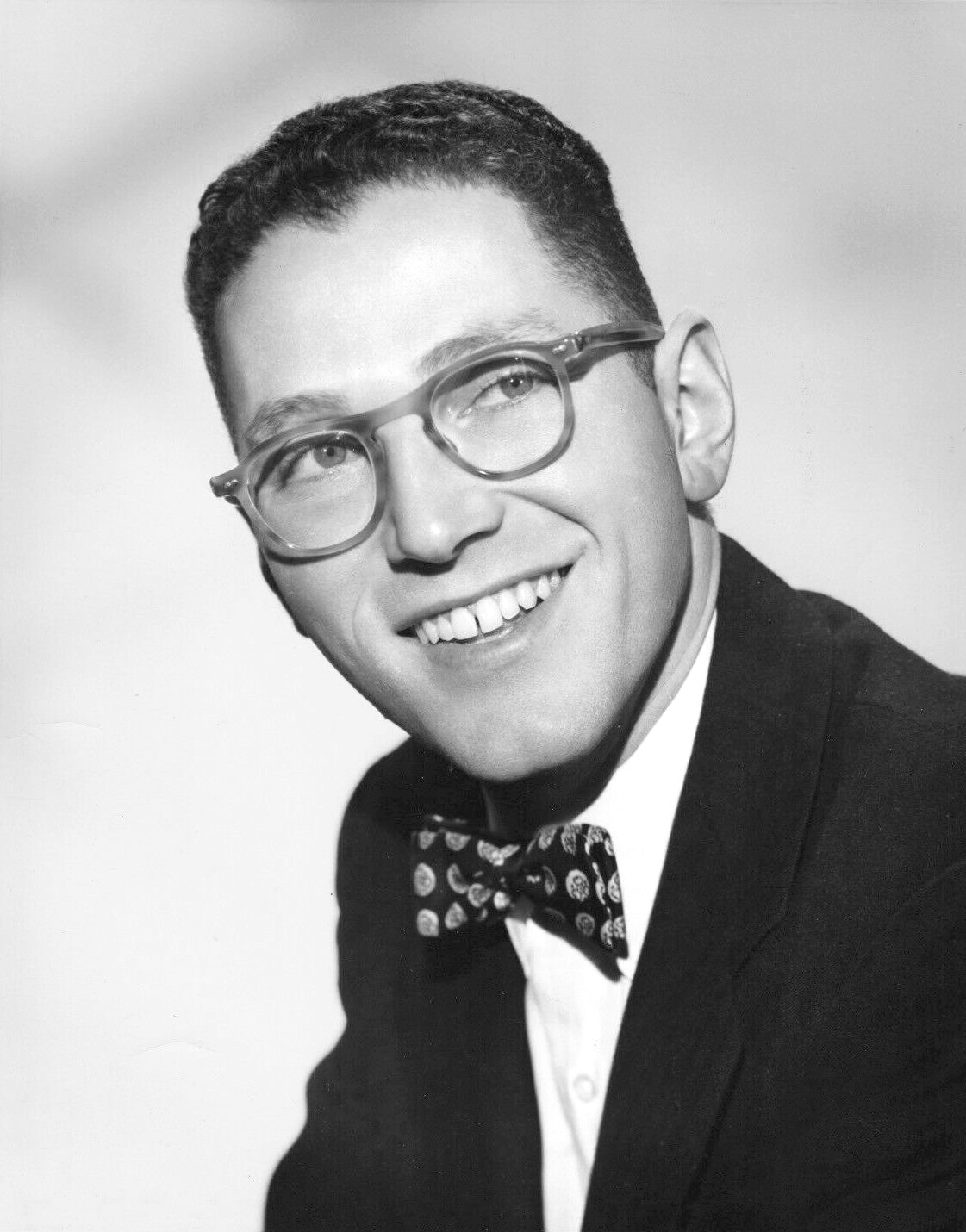
Tom Lehrer, musician and satirist; lectured in American studies, Mathematics, and Musical Theater

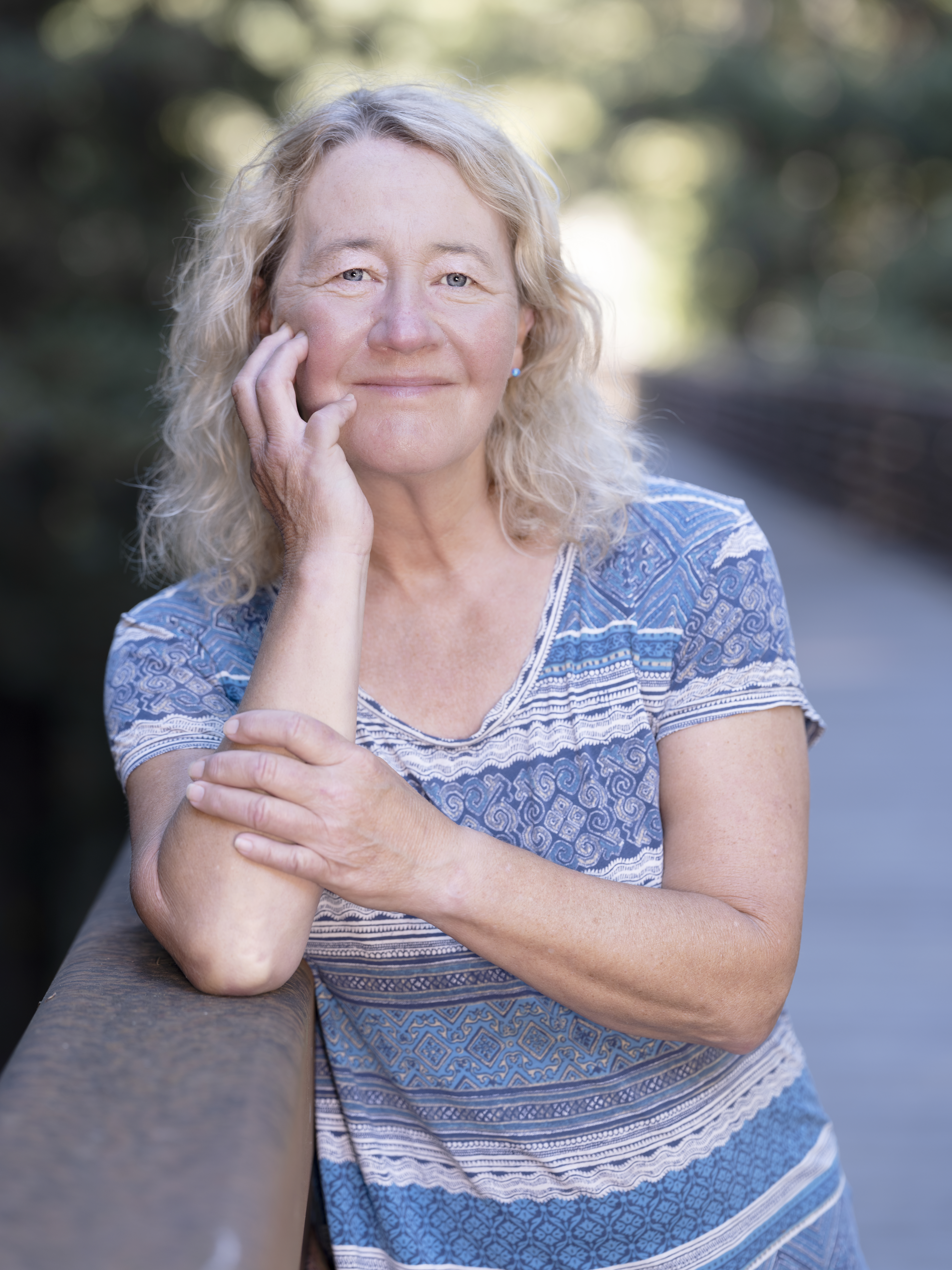
Carol W. Greider, distinguished professor of Molecular, Cell, and Developmental Biology; Nobel Prize winner

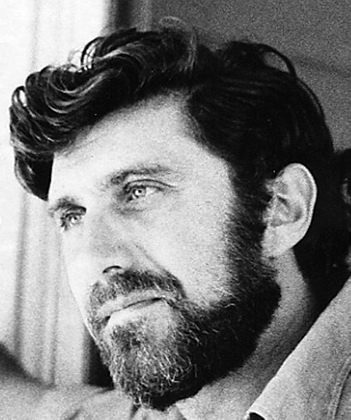
Elliot Aronson, professor emeritus of psychology, author, creator of the Jigsaw Classroom model, and the only psychologist to win the American Psychological Association's highest honor in all three fields

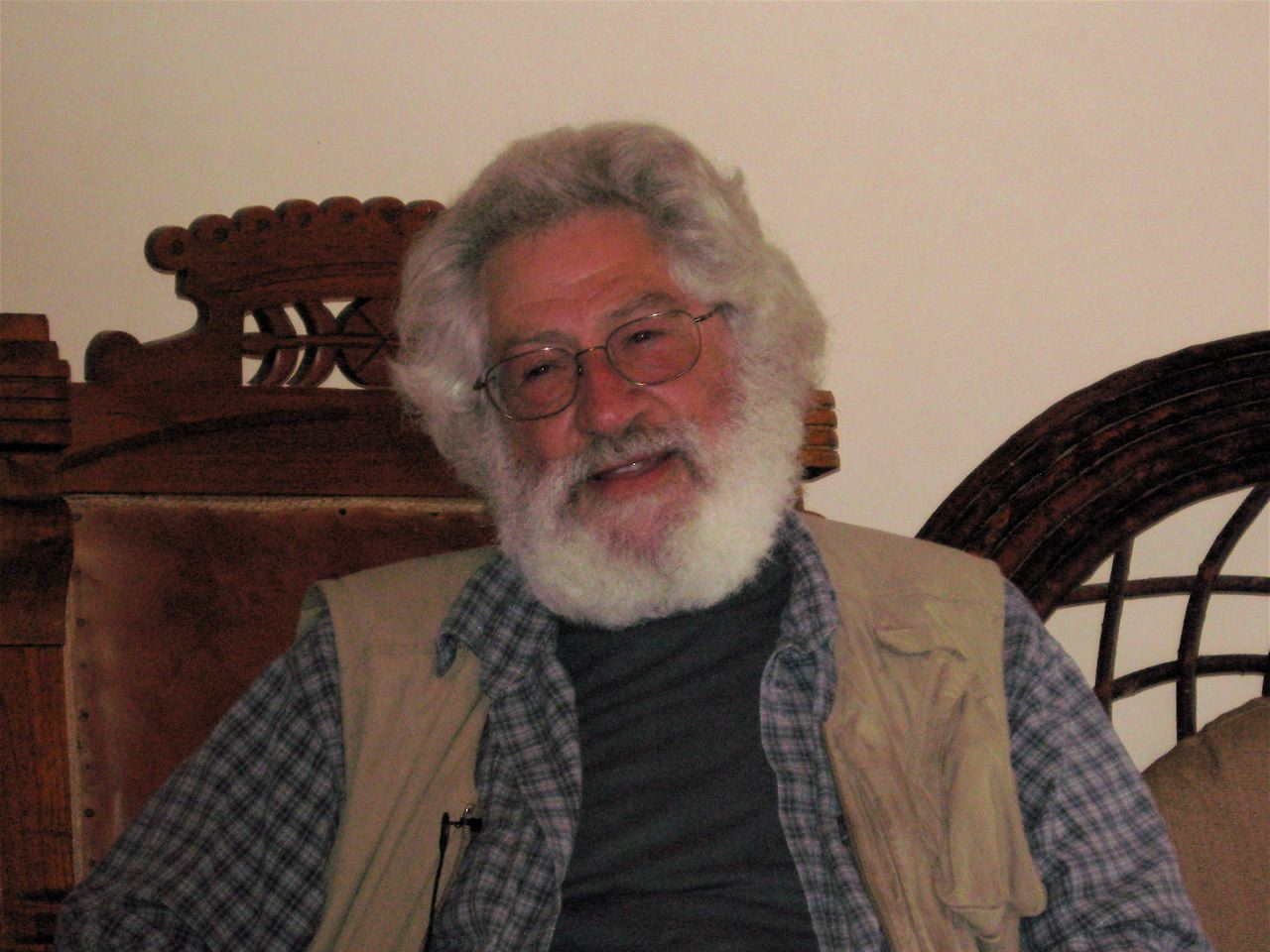
Ralph Abraham, professor emeritus of mathematics, founder of the Visual Mathematics Institute, and pioneer on chaos theory

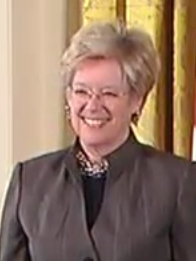
Sandra M. Faber, professor of astronomy and astrophysics, helped develop the cold dark matter theory, member of the NAS, the AAAS, and the American Philosophical Society

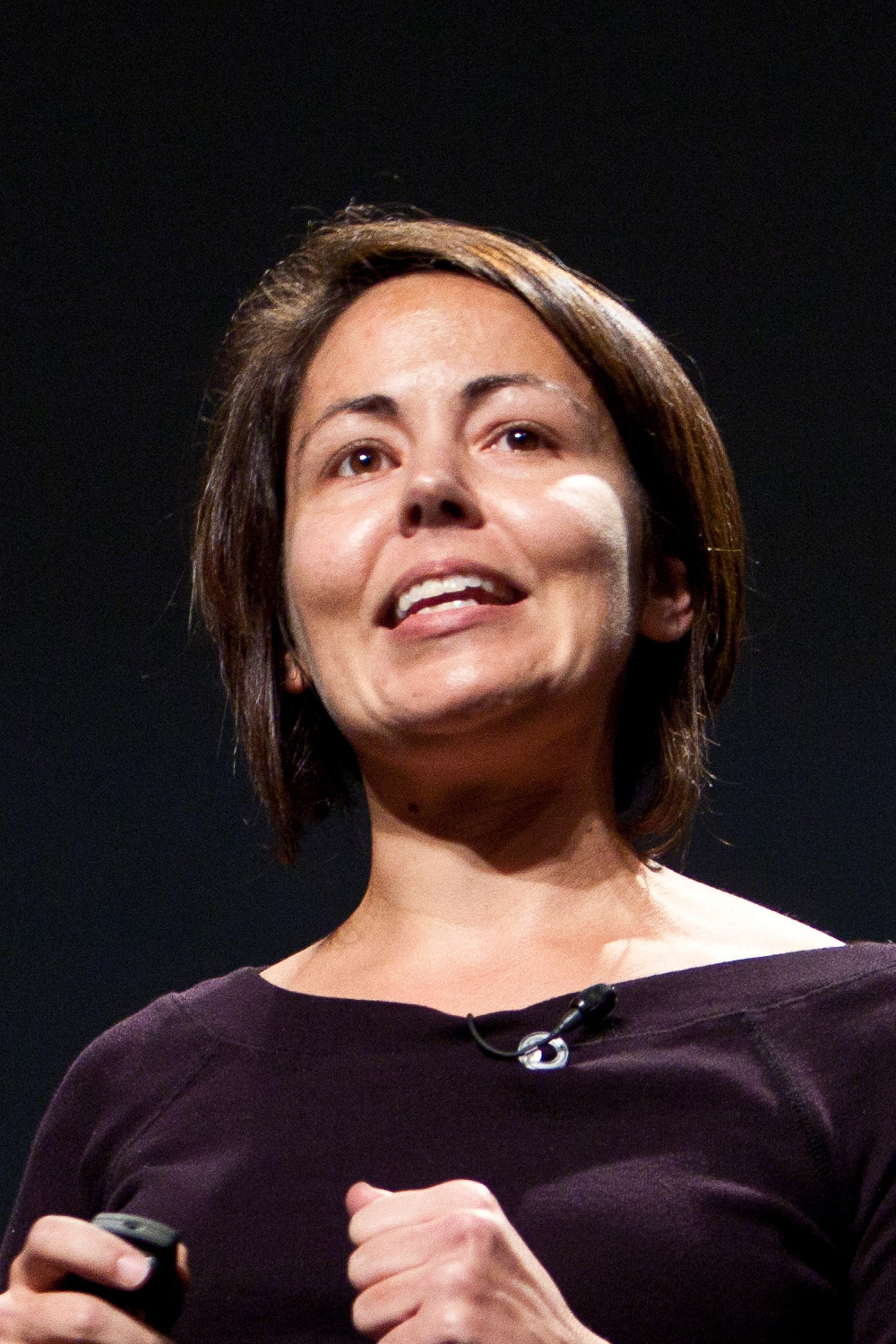
Beth Shapiro, professor of ecology and evolutionary biology, author, associate director for conservation genomics at the UC Santa Cruz Genomics Institute, Rhodes Scholar and MacArthur Grant fellow

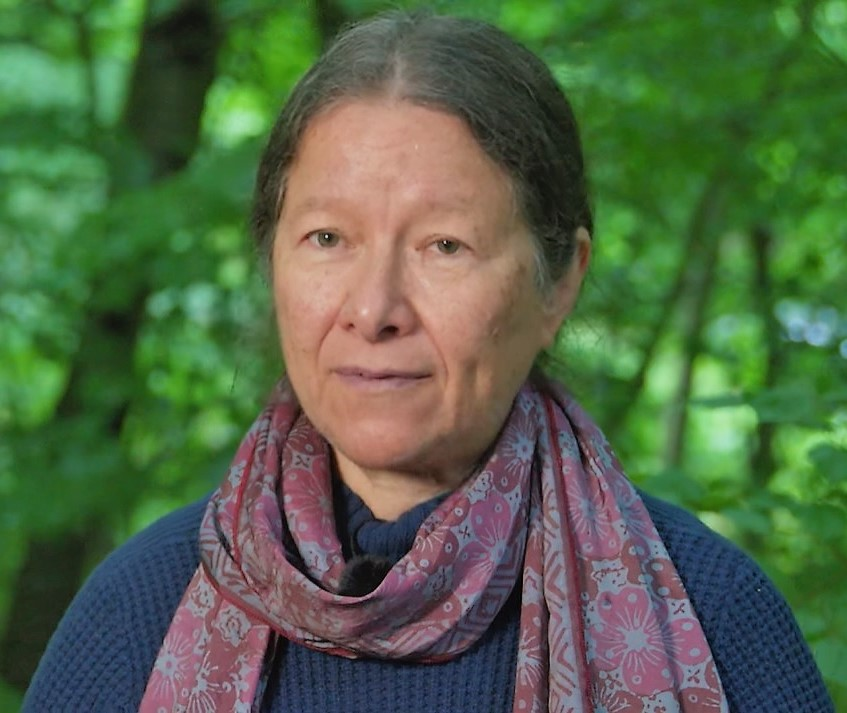
Anna Tsing, professor of anthropology, Guggenheim Fellow, and winner of the Niels Bohr professorship

== See also ==
- Shakespeare Santa Cruz
- University of California, Santa Cruz, Arboretum
- Notable Alumni and Faculty of the University of California, Santa Cruz
