= Ellen Petry Leanse =

American author and businesswoman

- Born: Dayton, Ohio, U.S.
- Education: San Diego State University
- Occupations: Coach; Speaker; Author
- Years active: 1981–present
- Website: ellenleanse.com

Ellen Petry Leanse (born Ellen Petry) is an American author, businesswoman, educator, entrepreneur, and online community pioneer. Leanse has spent 35 years working with leaders at Apple, Google, Facebook, as an entrepreneur, and with dozens of startups. She's a writer on topics of workplace dynamics and a Stanford instructor. Her work has spanned entrepreneurship, corporate leadership, investing, and strategy consulting.

A former employee of Apple (1981 – 1990), she launched the company's first online activity through the User Group Connection, an initiative she founded at Apple in 1985.

She worked for Google from 2008 through 2010 and created a social list-making app Lists by 222do for the initial launch of the Facebook development platform (2007).

In 2015, Business Insider published her LinkedIn article about the word "just" and its use across genders. The post received more than three million views. It was originally published via Women 2.0, an organization she advised from 2012 through 2016.

She spoke on "Happiness by Design" at TEDx Berkeley in 2016.

Leanse is an instructor at Stanford University and teaches through the university's Continuing Studies program.

Leanse is a contributing writer to Arianna Huffington's Thrive Global platform.

== Early life ==
Leanse was born in Dayton, Ohio, and raised in the Fairglen neighborhood of San Jose, CA. Her father, John Gerald Petry, was a WWII veteran and mechanical engineer who held several patents for automotive lift technology. Her mother, Kathleen Minch Petry, was a secretary and hospital administrator.

She graduated from Presentation High School in 1976 and was named a Bank of America Bicentennial Scholar and was also a National Merit Scholar. She studied art and international business and graduated from San Diego State University with a BA in International Marketing in 1981.

Shortly after graduating she was in a serious bicycle accident and returned to San Jose to recover at her parents' home. It was at that time that she applied to Apple and received a rejection letter, which she challenged. She was hired in November 1981 and wrote about the experience in a 2014 article about the Apple logo and its impact.

Her first job at Apple was as an International Communications Specialist in the Intercontinental division, which distributed and promoted Apple products, primarily the Apple II and Apple III and related accessories, everywhere in the world except for the US and Europe. She launched Apple's first formal product communications (they were newsletters) to these regions and introduced Spanish language versions of these communications in 1986. She also did product launches in the markets they served.

She joined the extended Macintosh team in 1983 as Product Manager for international Macintosh accessories, including local-language keyboards, CCITT and CSA modems, regionally-compliant printers, and power supplies.

In 1985 she was asked to interview for a role as Apple's first "User Evangelist" – a response to frustration in the Apple II installed base that Apple had abandoned, its earliest and most faithful users as it began to focus increasingly on the Macintosh. John Sculley served as a sponsor for this position and she accepted the role in September 1985.

== Technology career ==
=== Apple ===
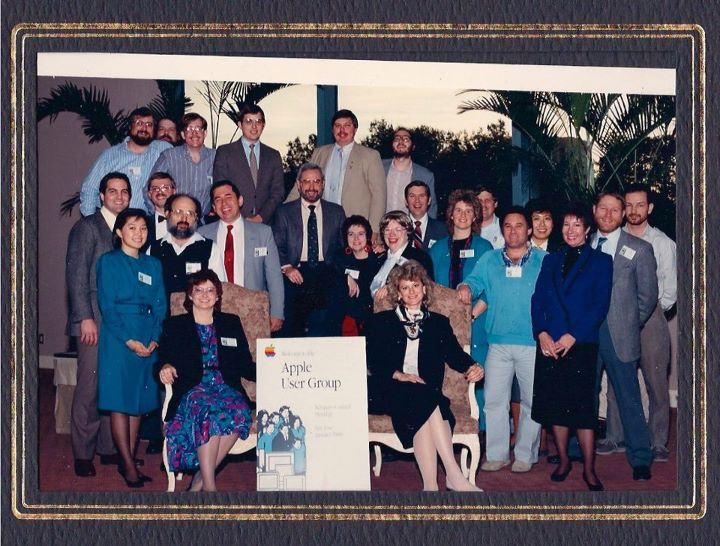
1988 User Group Advisory Council. Appearing in the chair to the right is Ellen Petry Leanse.

In her nine years at Apple Leanse served on the Macintosh launch team (1984) and led the company's pioneering work in creating online communities. Leanse became an Apple employee in November 1981 and became Apple's first User Evangelist in September 1985.

The User Group track she established at MacWorld conferences brought Apple product leaders including Bill Atkinson, Alan Kay, Guy Kawasaki together with users to exchange information on product priorities and direction.

Leanse led and grew this organization through 1990, when she left Apple.

Her charter was to address the frustration directed at Apple from the Apple II and Apple III installed base - individuals, business people, government officials and education leaders from around the world who had come to feel abandoned by Apple as it turned its attention to the Macintosh.

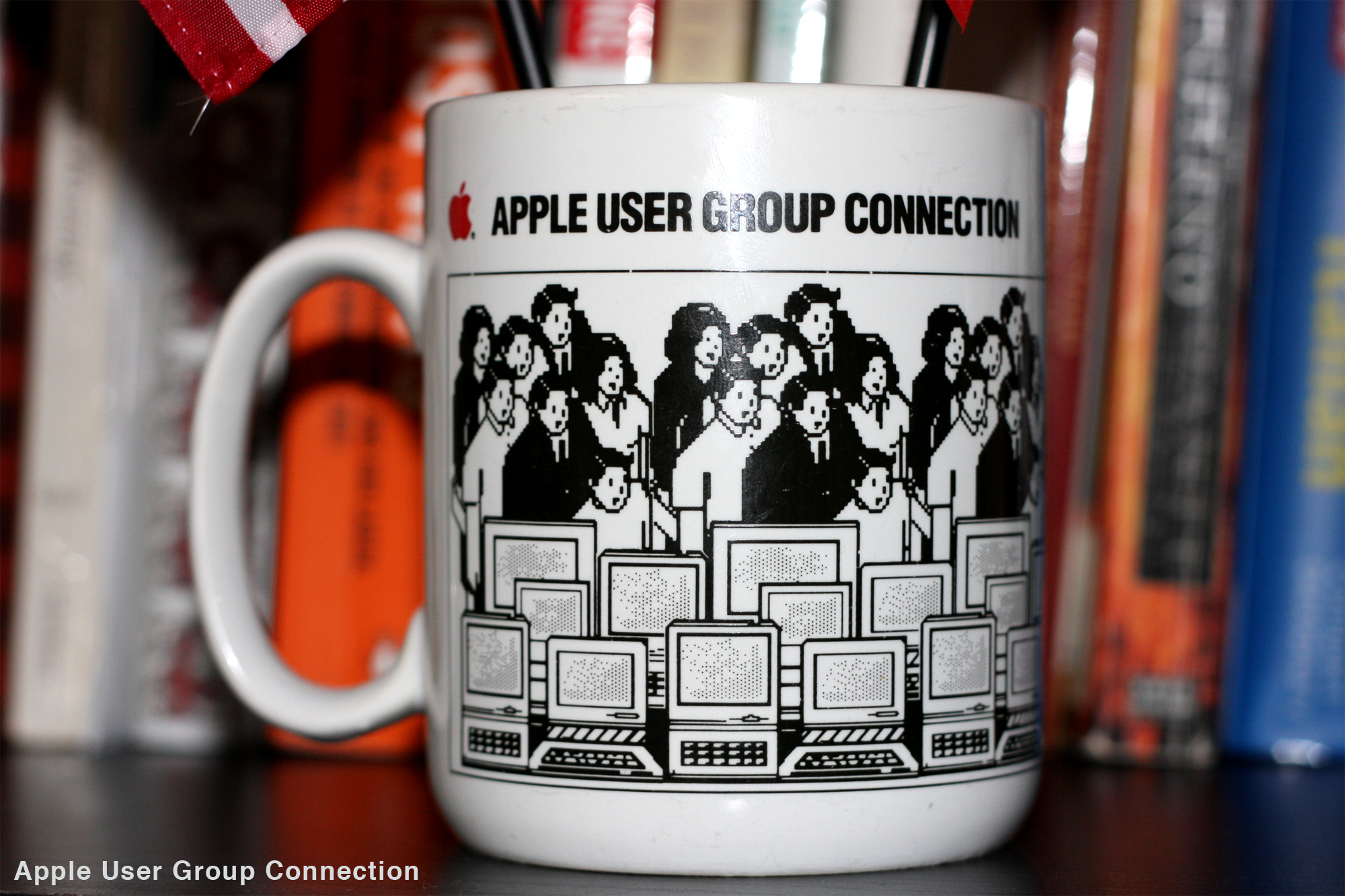
Image of old Apple mug provided to the Advisory Council

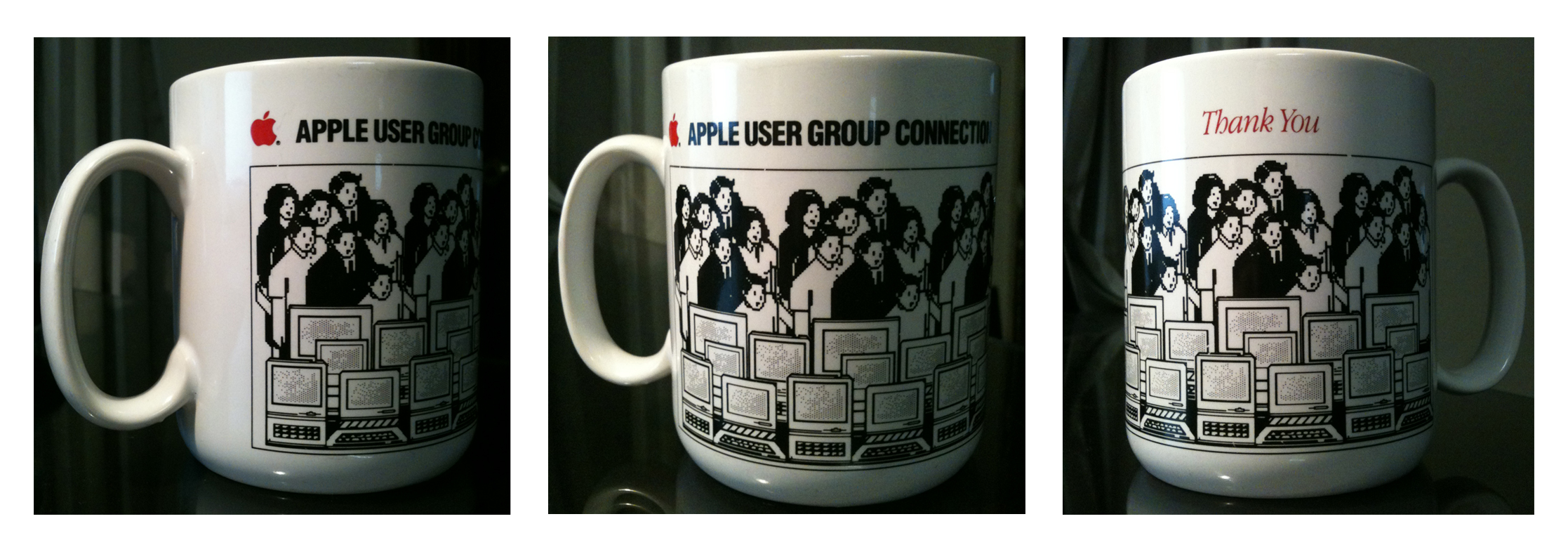
Ellen Petry Leanse guided the design of this vintage Apple mug, working with Apple's Creative Services team. She states, "It would not meet Apple design standards today but it sure worked at the time." The "Thanks" is a tribute to the Advisory Council Ellen Petry brought together to talk with Apple about ways of working with User Groups at the time.

In 1985 Leanse became Apple's first "User Evangelist," charged to forge relationships with Apple's growing, and increasingly divided, Apple II/Apple III and Macintosh installed base. Her early work connected her with technology influencers including NASA's David Lavery, the Boston Computer Society's Jonathan Rotenberg, and the Berkeley Macintosh User Group's Raines Cohen and Reese Jones.

Forming Apple's User Group Connection, Leanse established the first online interaction between Apple and its users in November 1985. This work leveraged existing networks including Usenet Arpanet/Darpanet, The Well, and private Bulletin Board Systems to bring product updates, live interviews, software updates, and other resources with Apple communities worldwide. Active participants included NASA's David Lavery, the Boston Computer Society's Jonathan Rotenberg, and the Berkeley Macintosh User Group's Raines Cohen and Reese Jones. The User Group track she established at MacWorld conferences brought Apple product leaders including Bill Atkinson, Alan Kay, Guy Kawasaki together with users to exchange information on product priorities and direction.

Eighteen months after the release of the Macintosh, owners of Apple II and Apple III personal computers expressed frustration with the limited development of new features for these products. Seeking a commitment to ongoing support of utilities and software, users contacted Apple, published complaints in computer publications, and spoke out at public events such as MacWorld and other trade shows to ask for a future path. Furthermore, as Macintosh users sought more direct means of learning about innovations and capabilities of the Mac and its software (in 1985, standards for customer support depended primarily on written/mailed correspondence) Macintosh users began to ask Apple and software providers for faster access to technical and usability information, as well as upgrades. Apple CEO John Sculley responded by creating a position for a "User Group Evangelist" charged with realigning Apple with its active user community through communication and identification of mutually-beneficial product development.

In September 1985, Apple established the Apple User Group Connection, led by Leanse, in response to input from users in community User Groups including Boston Computer Society and Berkeley Macintosh Users Group, along with user communities within educational, science, and business organizations.

AUGC was formed in response to concerns from users in community user groups that, with the release of the Macintosh, development for existing Apple II and Apple III computers were compromised. The idea was for Apple to share information with its user community directly, rather than through the more traditional support and distribution channels.

The organization successfully encouraged Apple to pursue early internet technology such as bulletin board systems and ARPANET. Leanse's work in the UGC guided her to establish Apple's first connection with users via the early roots of the web – ARPANET, The WELL, Bulletin board systems, etc. It was groundbreaking work that pioneered much of what is possible and done today through social networks and other online communities. Leanse grew and ran the group through 1990 when she left Apple to focus on her personal life. Many of the early UGC contributors have gone on to be real creators and contributors in their own rights. NASA's Dave Lavery, through his work with Apple User Groups within NASA and the Jet Propulsion Lab, was an active influencer of the User Group Connection's early progress.

The early days of Leanse's role aligned her with Apple's user group community and gave her a window into a new world: the early roots of the World Wide Web. Thousands of Apple users around the world were sharing information and support with each other and using their collective knowledge to make the most of their Apple systems using BBS networks, Arpa and Darpanet, The WELL, Usenet, and other systems. These users began to experiment with information-sharing through a few leads in this network, and realized the power that this network had to speed up product information, updates, and support to people, using much less effort than the standard method – the U.S. Mail – would have allowed.

AUGC produced promotional videos for Apple products.

In April 2012, PandoDaily included Leanse as one of the top 5 tech marketers. In the article she is attributed as being the pioneer of online community.

=== Google ===
She was an employee of Google between 2008 and 2010, charged with leading marketing communications for the Google G-Suite.

== Educator ==
In 2013 Leanse joined Stanford University's Continuing Studies faculty to teach the neuroscience of innovation through on-campus and online courses.

She currently teaches an online course, "Unleashing Creative Innovation and Building Great Products" for Stanford, combining principles of "cognitive neuroscience, design frameworks and evolutionary biology,"

Her work and course at Stanford were featured in the article, "Former Google and Apple exec now challenges Stanford students to design products that make people happy" via CNBC.

== Writer ==
She has published multiple articles on brain-aware leadership, well-being, gender, and interpersonal dynamics. Her articles have been globally syndicated, receiving up to 8 million views and guiding readers everywhere to new levels of self-awareness and empowerment.

== Author ==
=== The Happiness Hack ===
Leanse is a study of neuroscience and "brain hacking". Her book The Happiness Hack, published by Sourcebooks in 2017, explores concepts of attention, connection, and life satisfaction through perspectives on applied neuroscience.

=== Summary ===
The Happiness Hack uses the lens of evolutionary biology and neurochemistry to explore how routine behaviors in modern life can interfere with happiness – and how to "hack back," improving well-being and life satisfaction.

The book discusses various ideas and solutions that are rooted in neuroscience, examining the role of the brain in creating our point of view and how it affects our focus, purpose, and the achievement of true satisfaction, and how opening to new possibilities of thinking differently can help an individual "hack into happiness". The Happiness Hack is a brain-aware guide to bringing more enjoyment, success, and happiness to our daily, and long-term, lives.

By simplifying basic concepts of neuroscience, The Happiness Hack offers insights into stress, distraction, tech addiction, and a sense of disconnection in ways that let readers identify common mental tendencies – and guide the brain toward alternate paths.

=== Influences ===
Leanse has acknowledged the work of neuroleadership influencer David Rock in her book. She also acknowledges the work of Stanford researcher and neuroanatomist Sarah Eagleman, who provided scientific review on the book.

=== Reception ===
The Happiness Hack launched at a Kepler's Literary Foundation event to a live audience and global livestream. It was selected by Barnes and Noble as a featured book for the 2017 holiday season.

The Happiness Hack was named one of "The 12 Best Productivity Books of 2017" by Evernote.

=== Press ===
The Happiness Hack was prominently mentioned in the article, "Former Google and Apple exec now challenges Stanford students to design products that make people happy" via CNBC.

== Achievements ==
In 2012 Leanse was named a 'Silicon Valley Woman of Influence' by Business Journal.

Leanse has been a board member for D-Rev, the Children's Health Council, and the Menlo Park Atherton Education Foundation (serving the Menlo Park City School District).
