= Apple User Group Connection =

Users' group

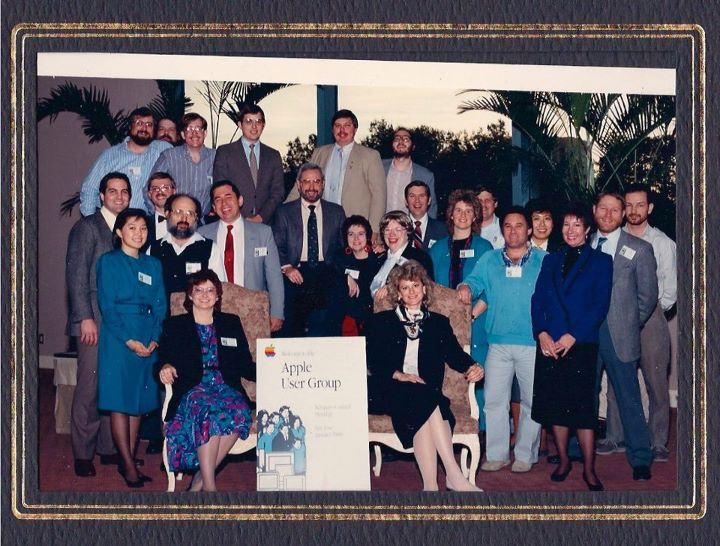
1988 user group advisory council. Appearing in the chair to the right is Ellen Petry Leanse.

The Apple User Group Connection (AUGC) was established in 1985 by Apple and led by Apple employee Ellen Petry Leanse. AUGC was formed in response to concerns from users in community user groups that, with release of the Macintosh, development for existing Apple II and Apple III computers was compromised. The idea was for Apple to share information with its user community directly, rather than through the more traditional support and distribution channels. The organization successfully encouraged Apple to pursue early internet technology such as bulletin board systems and ARPANET.

== History ==
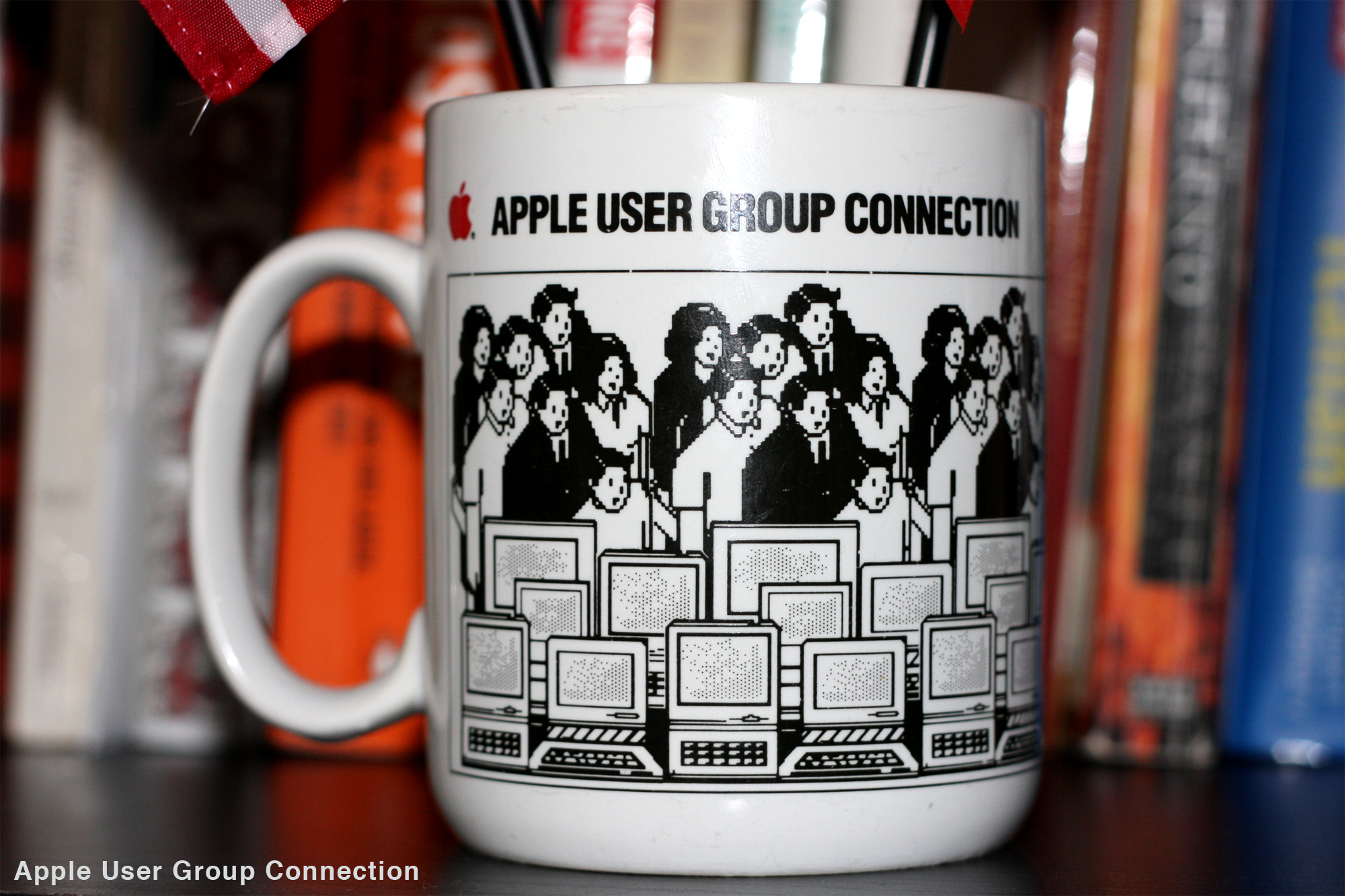
Image of old Apple mug provided to the advisory council

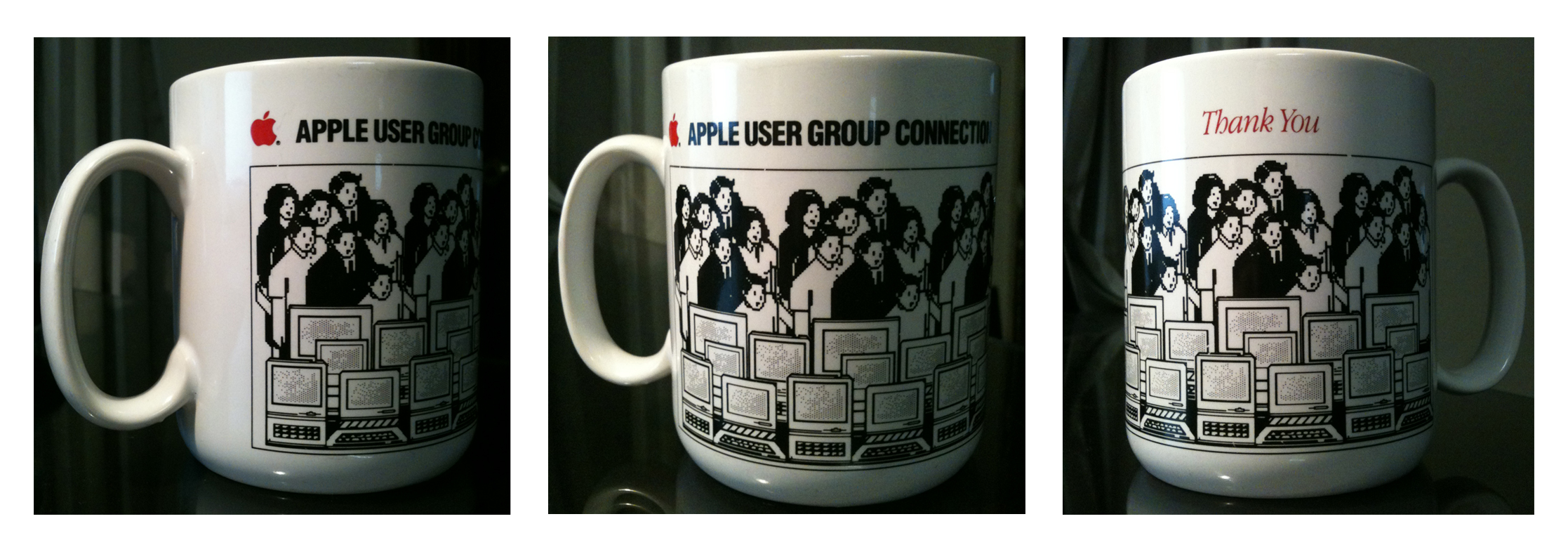
Ellen Petry Leanse guided the design of this vintage Apple mug, working with Apple's Creative Services team. She states, "It would not meet Apple design standards today but it sure worked at the time." The "Thanks" is a tribute to the advisory council Ellen Petry brought together to talk with Apple about ways of working with User Groups at the time.

Eighteen months after the release of the Macintosh, owners of Apple II and Apple III personal computers expressed frustration with the limited development of new features for these products. Seeking a commitment to ongoing support of utilities and software, users contacted Apple, published complaints in computer publications, and spoke out at public events such as MacWorld and other trade shows to ask for a future path. Furthermore, as Macintosh users sought more direct means of learning about innovations and capabilities of the Mac and its software (in 1985, standards for customer support depended primarily on written/mailed correspondence) Macintosh users began ask Apple and software providers for faster access to technical and usability information, as well as upgrades. Apple CEO John Sculley responded by creating a position for a "User Group Evangelist" charged with realigning Apple with its active user community through communication and identification of mutually-beneficial product development.

In September 1985, Apple established the Apple User Group Connection (AUGC) in response to input from users in community User Groups including Boston Computer Society and Berkeley Macintosh Users Group, along with user communities within educational, science, and business organizations.

Ellen Petry Leanse, an Apple employee since November 1981, became Apple's first user evangelist in September 1985. Her charter was to address the frustration directed at Apple from the Apple II and Apple III installed base - individuals, business people, government officials and education leaders from around the world who had come to feel abandoned by Apple as it turned its attention to the Macintosh.

== Accomplishments ==
Ellen Petry Leanse's work in the UGC guided her to establish Apple's first connection with users via the early roots of the web – ARPANET, The WELL, Bulletin board systems, etc. The idea was for Apple to share information with its user community as a direct channel, rather than through the more traditional support and distribution channels. It was groundbreaking work that pioneered much of what is possible and done today through social networks and other online communities. Leanse grew and ran the group through 1990 when she left Apple to focus on her personal life. Many of the early UGC contributors have gone on to be real creators and contributors in their own rights. NASA's Dave Lavery, through his work with Apple User Groups within NASA and the Jet Propulsion Lab, was an active influencer of the User Group Connection's early progress.

The early days of Leanse's role aligned her with Apple's passionate user group community and gave her an eye-opening window into a new world: the early roots of the World Wide Web. Through connected BBS networks, Arpa and Darpanet, The WELL, Usenet, and other systems, thousands of Apple users around the world were sharing information and support with each other and using their collective knowledge to make the most of their Apple systems. These pioneering users began to experiment with information-sharing through a few leads in this network, and quickly realized the power that this network had to speed product information, updates, and support to people, using much less effort than the standard method – the U.S. Mail – would have allowed.

AUGC produced promotional videos for Apple products.

In April 2012, PandoDaily included Leanse as one of the top 5 tech marketers. In the article she is attributed as being the pioneer of online community.

In 2014 Leanse was a keynote speaker on the history of online communities at community management and education platform CMX Hub’s inaugural CMX Summit conference.
