= Scarf (disambiguation) =

A scarf is a piece of fabric worn round the neck.

Scarf may also refer to:

== People with the name ==
- Arthur Scarf (1913–1941), Second World War Royal Air Force pilot posthumously awarded the Victoria Cross
- Eddie Scarf (1908–1980), Australian freestyle wrestler and boxer
- Frederick L. Scarf (1930-1988), American space physicist, twin brother of Herbert Scarf
- Herbert Scarf (1930–2015), American mathematician, twin brother of Frederick L. Scarf
- Maggie Scarf (born 1932), American writer, journalist and lecturer
- Phil Scarf, British statistician and professor
- Susan Scarf Merrell, American author

== Arts, entertainment, media ==
- The Scarf (film), 1951 American thriller
- The Scarf (opera), 1955 chamber opera
- The Scarf (novel) by Robert Bloch, originally written in 1947, revised 1966

== Other uses ==
- Scarf, slang word for gulp or eat "wolfishly" (as in "scarfed down one's food")
- Scarf joint (also known as a scarph joint), a method of joining two members end to end in woodworking or metalworking
- SCARF, a psychological framework developed by David Rock

== See also ==
- Scarfies, a 1999 New Zealand black comedy film
- Scarfie, a student at the University of Otago, Dunedin, Otago, South Island, New Zealand
- Scarfe (disambiguation)
