= Merrill College =

Residential college of the University of California, Santa Cruz

Coordinates: 37.00030°N 122.05291°W

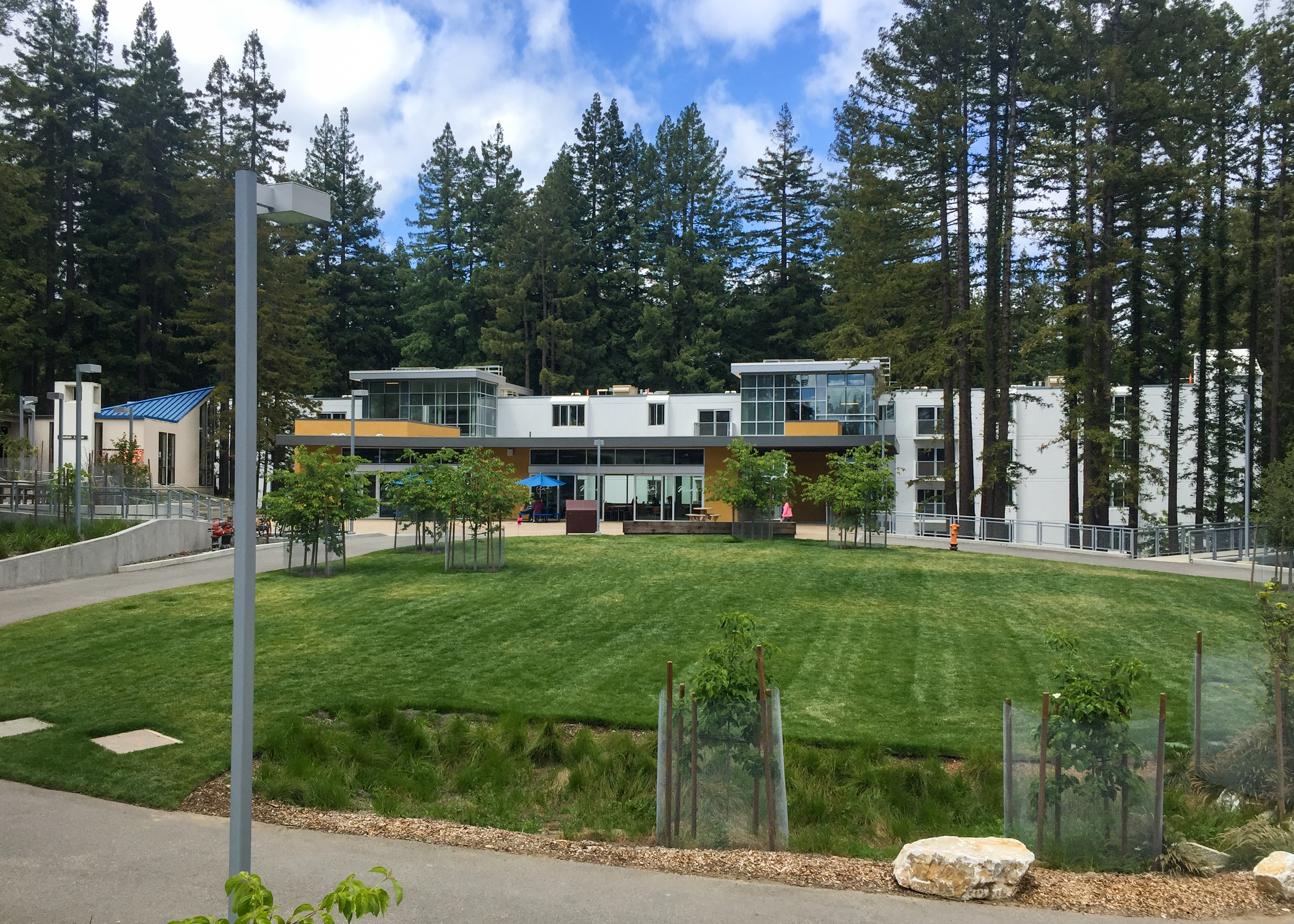
- Motto: Cultural Identities and Global Consciousness
- Type: Residential college
- Established: 1968
- Affiliations: UC Santa Cruz
- Provost: Aims McGuinness
- Undergraduates: 1385
- Location: University of California; 1156 High Street; Santa Cruz, CA 95064, Santa Cruz, California
- Campus: Suburban/Sylvan
- Colors: Blue and Orange
- Nickname: Merrillites
- Mascot: Merrill Bird
- Website: www.merrill.ucsc.edu/

Merrill College is a residential college at the University of California, Santa Cruz. The theme of the college, and the name of its freshman core course, is "cultural identities and global consciousness."

== Location ==
Merrill is located at the far northeastern corner of the University of California, Santa Cruz campus, east of Crown College and north of Cowell and Stevenson colleges. The college sits at the top of a hill and can only be reached by steep access roads and pedestrian paths. The grounds cover approximately nine acres of land (the smallest of the residential colleges) covered largely by tall redwood trees.

== History ==
Merrill was founded in 1968 as the fourth college at UCSC. The college takes its name from Charles E. Merrill Jr., former Headmaster of the Commonwealth School in Boston. In 1968, Merrill was the chairman of the Charles E. Merrill Trust, named for his father, Charles E. Merrill Sr., the founder of Merrill Lynch. It was in this year that the Trust elected to donate funds for the construction of the hitherto-named College Four at Santa Cruz.

The first three colleges at UCSC all had clearly identified academic specialties before their founding: Cowell in the humanities, Stevenson in the social sciences, and Crown in the natural sciences. However, Merrill allowed its early faculty and students to determine its theme. The college originally intended to focus on international studies, but an early shift towards global poverty led to its eventual emphasis on the developing countries and their cultures, as well as the impact of the United States in the developing world.

With a progressive theme, Merrill quickly attracted liberal and radical faculty and students. It offered ethnic studies classes as well as student housing with ethnic studies emphases, and attracted progressive visitors, including Herbert Marcuse in 1975. Merrill also gained a reputation as a campus center of openness and acceptance for gays and lesbians; in 1991 it established the Vito Russo House in one of its student residences.

In 2003, as part of a campus-wide food service consolidation program, the Merrill dining hall closed and was converted into a multi-use space, called the Merrill Cultural Center. In 2006, the History Department, and many affiliated faculty, left their longtime home at Merrill for the new Humanities Building next to Cowell College.

In 2014, Merrill College was renovated, updating the dorms to fire code standards and was remodeled.

== Architecture and buildings ==
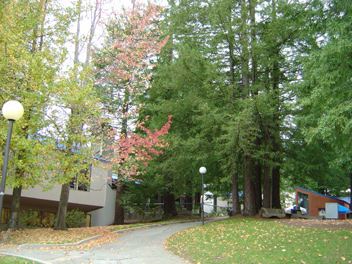
The Quad at Merrill College

The San Francisco architectural firm Campbell and Wong designed the buildings at Merrill College. Most of the original structures were completed by 1970. The Crown-Merrill Apartments were added in 1986.

Unlike the first colleges, Merrill does not consist of Bay Regionalist or Mediterranean buildings centered around formal quads. Instead, its structures present three key features: starkly modern and Scandinavian design, orientation around the redwood trees that once were the focal point of the site (removed in Spring 2013 for a redesign), and playfully historical components such as the bridges to the residential towers, balconies with lattice railings, and the bell tower above the dining hall. The college hosts a range of colors, rust red and off-white residence halls. Merrill prominently features blue metal roofs for nearly every building, with the exception of the two main residence towers.

The Merrill circle, at the top of a driveway off McLaughlin Drive, is the formal entrance to the college. The college office and the academic buildings, with faculty offices, seminar rooms, and a lecture hall, are immediately behind the circle. Just below the main Academic Building are three smaller buildings. One contains the Charles E. Merrill Lounge, another is an annex of faculty offices and home to the Center for Justice, Tolerance, and Community; and lastly, the Casa Latina.

The college activities office and Vivas Mexican Food, a Mexican restaurant based in midtown Santa Cruz, are in a small building at the center of the college, adjacent to a small courtyard in front of the former dining hall.

Merrill has four primary residence halls. Lorde-Studds, Kochiyama, Bulosan and Gandhi-Kahlo House (usually referred to as "A Dorm" and "B Dorm" respectively) are in two large, five-story buildings that close a loose square with the dining hall and academic buildings. Two smaller houses, Chavez-Menchu and DuBois (C and D), are located to the East of the college circle and Ming Ong computer lab.

Near the college are buildings housing the Lionel Cantú GLBTI Resource Center, KZSC radio, and the campus Peace Corps office. The Crown-Merrill apartments are located across a ravine from the main college.

Most Merrill freshmen reside in the residence halls, with most sophomores in the college apartments. Upper-division students generally live off-campus.

There is also the Merrill and Alan Chadwick gardens on Garden Ct.

Beginning Spring of 2013, a major redesign of the Merrill quad and residence halls was underway. The first stages of the construction involved the removal of dozens of redwood trees that had formerly given the location is distinctively sylvan quality.

== Academic emphases ==
Merrill remains a campus center for studies of the developing world and cultural studies. Its freshman core course includes readings by authors from Cuba, Morocco, inner-city Los Angeles, and most recently Darfur.

In particular, it houses many faculty in Spanish language and Latin American and Latino Studies (LALS). Both the LALS academic offices and the Casa Latina library and resource center are housed in the Merrill academic buildings.

Merrill College also houses the faculty and administrative offices of the Politics Department and the Legal Studies Program.

== Core course ==
The core course is called "Reading Ourselves, Reading the World" (MERR 1). This course focuses on developing academic and critical thinking skills for incoming students, who are required to take the course if they are assigned to Merrill College.

== Programs ==
Merrill has the only pottery co-op in the Santa Cruz colleges. It also offers opportunities to volunteer in local elementary schools. Merrill is home to the Merrill Student Government (MSG): one of the most active student governments at UCSC, the Merrill Activities Council: a group for students to come together and plan programs and events for the Merrill Community, and annually hosts the most highly attended dances on the UCSC campus including "Moat Jam" (the kickoff dance for each academic year), the annual Halloween Dance and "Glitterball" (the kickoff to the Universities month of LGBT pride events)

== Traditions ==
The Merrill moat, created by a retaining wall adjacent to the large college dormitories, features murals by Merrill students. Every spring, Merrill students decide which murals should remain and which should be painted over with new artwork. After the new murals are chosen, students gather on a weekend to help paint the new murals at an event called Merrill Moat Day. Along with painting over the old murals and starting the new ones, the event includes activities put on by the RA's (Residential Assistants) and a barbecue for Merrill Students. In the past, activities like henna tattoos, tie dyeing t-shirts, and other arts and crafts have been featured. Merrill also hosts a campus-wide dance in the moat at the beginning of each academic year, called Moat Jam. It usually takes place on the Sunday evening of Welcome Week.

== Provosts ==
- Phillip Bell, 1968–1972
- John Marcum, 1972–1977
- George von der Muhll, 1979–1981
- Ralph C. Guzmàn, 1982–1984
- John Isbister, 1984–1999
- John Schecter, 1999–2005
- Lourdes Martinez-Echazabal, 2005–2011
- Kathy Foley, 2011–2012
- Elizabeth Abrams 2012–2023
- Aims McGuinness 2023-
