= Goldfein =

Goldfein is a surname of Ashkenazi Jewish origin. It means "fine as gold" in German. Notable people with the surname include:

- David L. Goldfein (born 1959), US Air Force general and former chief of staff
- Jocelyn Goldfein, American technology executive and software engineer
- Stephen M. Goldfein, US Air Force major general

== See also ==
- Goldfine
