= Marc Rotenberg =

American lawyer

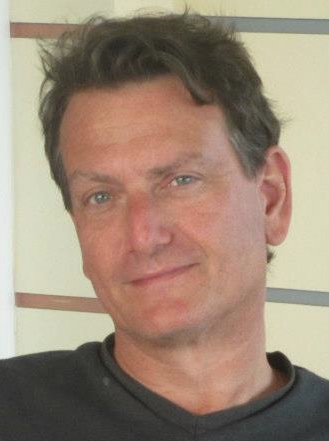
- Born: April 20, 1960 (age 66); Boston, Massachusetts, U.S.
- Education: Harvard College; Stanford Law School; Georgetown University Law Center
- Occupations: Executive Director, Center for AI and Digital Policy; former president and executive director, Electronic Privacy Information Center; adjunct professor of law, Georgetown Law, Georgetown University
- Relatives: Jonathan Rotenberg (brother)

Marc Rotenberg (born April 20, 1960) is executive director and founder of the Center for AI and Digital Policy, an independent non-profit organization incorporated in Washington, D.C.

Rotenberg is the co-editor of The AI Policy Sourcebook, a member of the OECD Expert Group on AI, and helped draft the Universal Guidelines for AI. He teaches the GDPR and privacy law at Georgetown Law and Intro to AI at Georgetown University. He is a founding board member and former chair of the Public Interest Registry, which manages the .ORG domain.

== Early life and education ==
Rotenberg was born in Boston, Massachusetts. He received an A.B. in Social Studies and Computer Science from Harvard College, where he was a founding editor of the Harvard International Review and served as a teaching fellow in computer science. He subsequently earned a J.D. from Stanford Law School, where he served as an articles editor of the Stanford Law Review and president of the Stanford Public Interest Law Foundation. He later obtained an LL.M. in International and Comparative Law from Georgetown University Law Center.

== Career ==
Following law school, Rotenberg served as counsel to U.S. Senator Patrick Leahy on the Senate Judiciary Committee, focusing on issues involving law, technology, and civil liberties. During the 1980s and early 1990s, he participated in several public-interest technology initiatives, including Computer Professionals for Social Responsibility and the Computers, Freedom, and Privacy conference. Earlier, he launched the Public Interest Computer Association to teach non-profits about computer technology.

In 1994, Rotenberg co-founded the Electronic Privacy Information Center (EPIC), a public-interest research organization based in Washington, D.C. As president and executive director, he led advocacy efforts concerning privacy, surveillance, consumer protection, cybersecurity, and government transparency. Under his leadership, EPIC pursued litigation, Freedom of Information Act requests, and policy initiatives related to emerging technologies and civil liberties.

Rotenberg left EPIC in 2020. The organization's board cited his longstanding contributions to privacy advocacy and digital rights while announcing a leadership transition.

=== Center for AI and Digital Policy ===
In 2020, Rotenberg founded the Center for AI and Digital Policy (CAIDP), an independent non-profit organization dedicated to the governance of artificial intelligence and the protection of democratic values in the digital era. CAIDP conducts research, policy analysis, training programs, and international advocacy related to AI regulation, algorithmic accountability, and human rights. By 2025, the organization had established a global research network spanning more than 120 countries and published annual comparative assessments of national AI policies.

Rotenberg has been a prominent advocate for international AI governance frameworks and contributed to the development of the Universal Guidelines for Artificial Intelligence, a human-rights-based framework for AI regulation endorsed by experts and organizations worldwide. He has also served on the OECD AI Group of Experts and advised governments and international institutions on AI policy.

Research and policy work

Rotenberg's work has focused on privacy law, data protection, government transparency, cybersecurity, and artificial intelligence governance.He has testified before the United States Congress, the 9/11 Commission, the European Parliament, UNESCO, and the OECD on issues related to technology policy and civil liberties. He has also participated in expert panels for organizations including the OECD, UNESCO, the International Telecommunication Union, and the Council of Europe.

== Publications ==
Rotenberg has authored, edited, or co-edited numerous books and reference works on privacy law and technology policy, including:

- The AI Policy Sourcebook (2025)
- Privacy and Society (2016, with Anita Allen)
- Privacy in the Modern Age: The Search for Solutions (2015)
- The Privacy Law Sourcebook
- Information Privacy Law
- Litigation Under the Federal Open Government Laws

== Honors and awards ==
- ACM Policy Award (2021)
- ABA Cyberspace Law Excellence Award
- World Technology Award for Law
- Norbert Wiener Award for Social and Professional Responsibility
- Georgetown University Vicennial Medal for Distinguished Service

He is a member of the American Bar Foundation, the American Law Institute, the Council on Foreign Relations, and the European Law Institute.

== Personal life ==
Rotenberg grew up in Boston, Massachusetts. His brother, Jonathan Rotenberg, founded the Boston Computer Society. Outside his professional work, Rotenberg is an accomplished chess player and won the Washington, D.C., chess championship in 2007, 2008, and 2010. He has also promoted chess education initiatives in public schools. He is a licensed United States Coast Guard captain.
