= Charles E. Merrill Jr. =

American educator, author, and philanthropist (1920–2017)

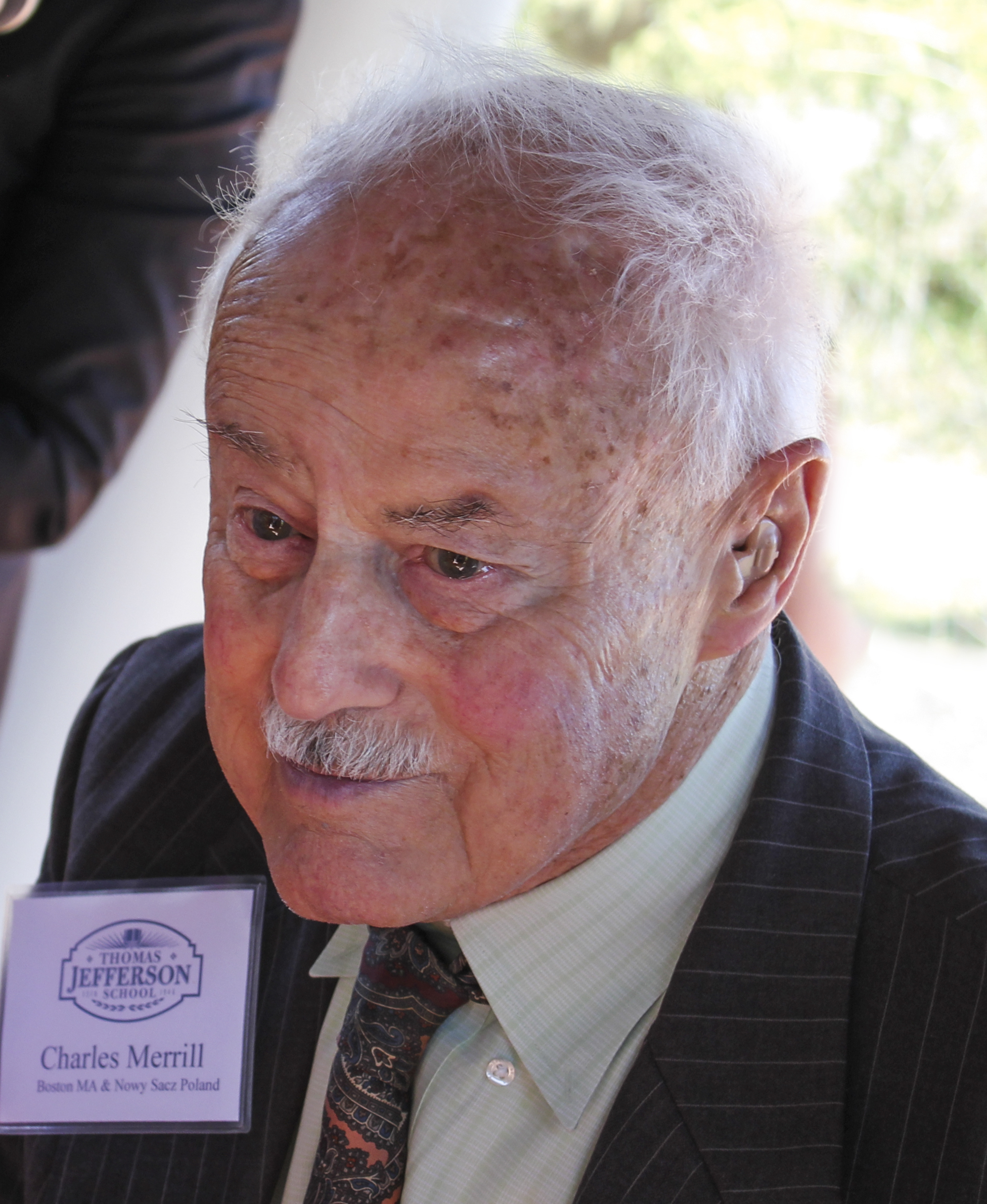
- Born: Charles Edward Merrill Jr. August 17, 1920
- Died: November 29, 2017 (aged 97); Nowy Sącz, Poland
- Education: Harvard College
- Occupations: Educator, author, philanthropist
- Spouses: Mary White Klohr (m. 1942; died 1999): Julie Boudreaux
- Children: 5
- Father: Charles E. Merrill
- Relatives: James Merrill (brother); Peter Magowan (nephew)

Charles Edward Merrill Jr. (August 17, 1920 – November 29, 2017) was an American educator, author, and philanthropist, best known for supporting historically black colleges and founding the Commonwealth School in Boston.

== Early life ==
Merrill was the son of Charles E. Merrill, one of the founders of Merrill Lynch, the stock brokerage and investment banking firm. Merrill was the second of two children born to Charles E. Merrill and his first wife, Elizabeth Church Merrill. He was the younger brother of Doris Merrill Magowan (1916–2001), and the half-sibling to the poet James Merrill (1926–1995).

He spent his childhood and adolescence in New York City. He attended Deerfield Academy and graduated from Harvard College. Merrill was the recipient of a Fulbright grant which he used to teach in Austria.

== Military service ==
Merrill was conscripted into the military during World War II. He served in the Fifth United States Army in North Africa, Italy, and Germany through the end of the war. One of the stories emanating from this experience was Merrill's involvement in rescuing a teenaged Jewish boy he encountered in Germany named Bernat Rosner. Rosner was orphaned by the Holocaust and was befriended by Merrill. Merrill assisted Rosner to emigrate to the United States. Merrill sponsored Rosner's education and eventually Rosner attended Harvard Law School and became General Counsel of Safeway Stores, Inc., the grocery story chain founded by the senior Charles E. Merrill and run by Merrill's brother-in-law Robert Anderson Magowan. Rosner's life was recounted in a book named Uncommon Friendship: From Opposite Sides of the Holocaust (University of California Press, 2001).

== Educator and philanthropist ==
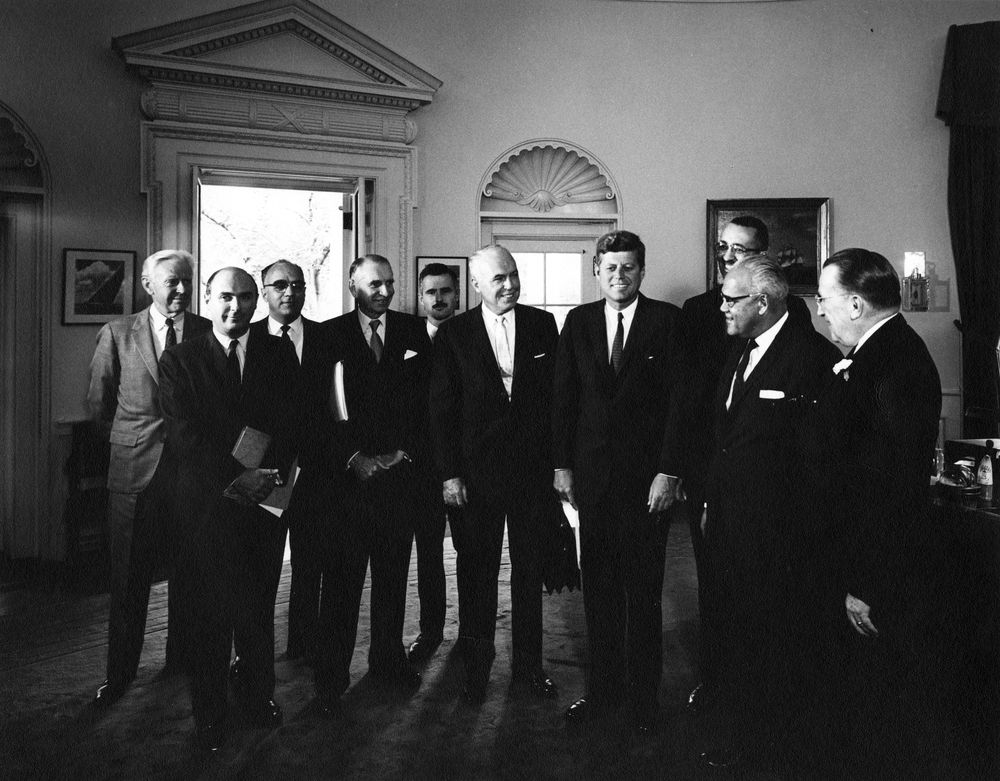
President John F. Kennedy meets with members of the United Negro College Fund in the Oval Office. Left to right: Chairman of the Board of Directors of Waddell and Reed, Inc., Chauncey L. Waddell; investment banker from New Orleans, Louisiana, Edgar B. Stern, Jr.; President of the United Negro College Fund and President of the Tuskegee Institute, Luther H. Foster; Editor of The Atlantic Monthly, Edward A. "Ted" Weeks; Headmaster of the Commonwealth Schools of Boston, Massachusetts, and Chairman of the Board of Trustees of Morehouse College in Atlanta, Georgia, Charles Merrill, Jr.; former Vice President and General Counsel of the Ford Motor Company, William T. Gossett; President Kennedy; Executive Director of the United Negro College Fund, William J. Trent, Jr.; President of the Phelps-Stokes Fund and Founder of the United Negro College Fund of New York, Frederick D. Patterson; Chairman of the Board of Trustees of the Tuskegee Institute, Basil O'Connor. White House, Washington, D.C.

Merrill founded the Commonwealth School in Boston in 1958. Housed in two connected townhouses in Boston's Back Bay at the corner of Commonwealth Avenue and Dartmouth Street, the school was personally funded and staffed by Merrill from its beginnings. He retired as the headmaster of the school in 1981. The school was a reflection of Merrill's principles. His goal was to provide a rigorous classical education to minority students and the less fortunate, heavy on history, English, and writing; Merrill himself taught Bible class to the entire class of ninth graders, not from a religious perspective but from a humanistic one. He also maintained the principles of Yankee frugality, requiring students to participate in the upkeep of the school, from bussing tables and washing dishes at lunch to emptying trash baskets at the end of the day. His generosity was quiet but overflowing; it was not unusual for Merrill to foot the tuition bills, even college tuition, for students who were financially distressed.

Commonwealth School was not Merrill's first foray into high school education. He also was one of the co-founders of the Thomas Jefferson School in St. Louis in 1946.

Merrill's philanthropy extended to several other institutions of higher education. Merrill was the Chairman of the Charles E. Merrill Trust, the charitable foundation named after his father. The Merrill Trust donated the money used to endow Merrill College at the University of California, Santa Cruz in 1968. Merrill also served for more than 15 years as the Chairman of the Board of Trustees of Morehouse College, the historically black college in Atlanta. Merrill Hall on the Morehouse campus was dedicated in his name to honor his many contributions to the school. He also served on Boards of Marlboro College in Vermont and Hampshire College in western Massachusetts. He has taught semesters at Guilford College, Moravian College, Spelman College, and Warren Wilson College.

== Personal life ==
Despite great personal wealth derived from an unbreakable trust made early in his childhood, Merrill lived modestly. Before his father's death, Merrill and his two siblings renounced any further inheritance from their father's estate in exchange for $100 "as full quittance"; as a result, much of Charles Merrill Sr.'s estate was donated to his namesake trust.

James Merrill dedicated his 1985 collection of poems Late Settings "for my sister Doris and my brother Charles." (His 1957 novel The Seraglio, widely read as a portrait of Charles E. Merrill's womanizing ways, was dedicated to the poet's ten nephews and nieces.) James Merrill shared with his brother a lifelong love of opera, an experience he wrote about in his 1993 memoir, A Different Person. Merrill married his high school sweetheart, Mary White Klohr, in 1942. It was a happy marriage which produced five children and lasted until her death in 1999. Unlike his father, Merrill Jr. was a modest, unassuming man who was faithful to his wife and dedicated to his family. Merrill then married Julie Boudreaux, who survived him.

== Later years ==
Merrill wrote an account of his experiences of founding and leading Commonwealth School for 23 years in a book called The Walled Garden (Rowan Tree Press 1982). Merrill was an internationalist, and his travels have taken him to the former Soviet satellite states of Czechoslovakia and Poland, as well as the other countries of Central Europe, as well as Eastern Europe. He wrote about these travels in a book called The Journey. Other books written by Merrill are: The Trip to Paris, Emily's Year, The Great Ukrainian Partisan Movement, and The Checkbook. He helped start the Foundation for Educational Support (Fondacija za podrsku obrazovanju) in Lukavac, Bosnia and Herzegovina.

He often spoke on democratic reforms and freedoms. In addition, Merrill was also an accomplished artist.

At the time of his death, he resided in Beacon Hill, Boston, Massachusetts, on a farm in Hancock, New Hampshire, and in Nowy Sącz, Poland.

He died on November 29, 2017, in Nowy Sącz, Poland.
