= Porter College =

Residential college at the University of California, Santa Cruz

Coordinates: 36.99424°N 122.06557°W

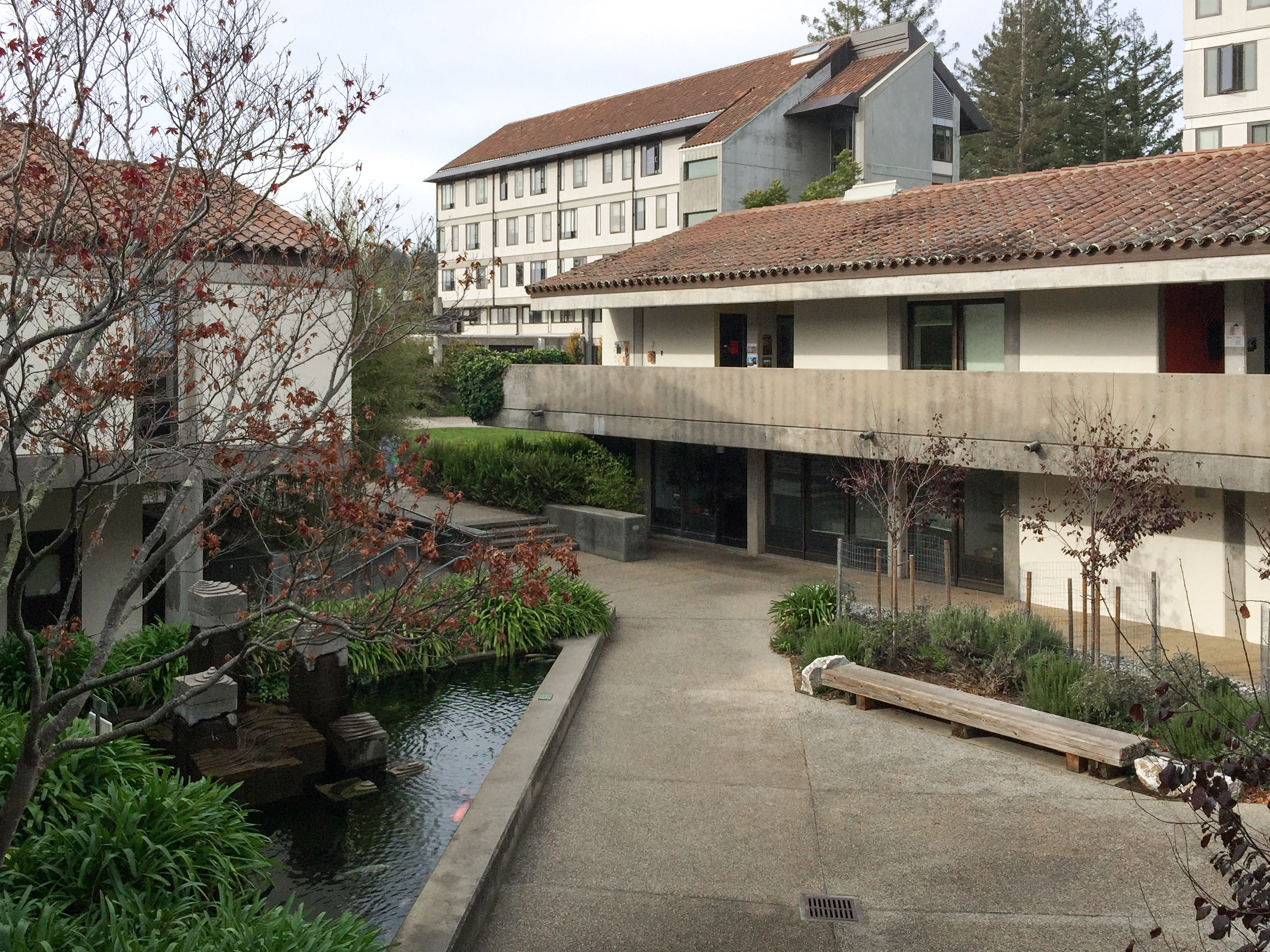
- Motto: Ars Longa, Vita Brevis
- Motto in English: Life is short, Art endures
- Type: Residential college
- Established: 1969
- Provost: Soraya Murray
- Undergraduates: 1,526
- Location: University of California; 1156 High Street; Santa Cruz, CA 95064, (United States) Santa Cruz, California
- Campus: Suburban/Sylvan
- Colors: UCSC Blue; UCSC Gold
- Website: www.porter.ucsc.edu/

Benjamin F. Porter College, known colloquially as Porter College, is a residential college at the University of California, Santa Cruz. It is located on the lower west side of the university, south of Kresge College and north of Rachel Carson College. The college was founded in 1969 as College Five and formally dedicated on November 21, 1981. On that day the college was given the motto Ars Longa, Vita Brevis (Art endures, Life is short), and a series of college symbols, including a faculty mace and a college bell, were inaugurated.

The faculty of the college has had a distinguished leadership. The provosts of the college have included the writer James B. Hall, the painter and psychologist Pavel Machotka, filmmaker Eli Hollander and composer David Cope. In early years, the college community was famous for Friday-afternoon sherry hours and afternoon croquet matches on the quad, suggesting that "l'esprit de Santa Cruz" was not far from that of Oxbridge.

== Description ==
Situated on a meadow overlooking the Monterey Bay, Porter's original focus was on the visual and performing arts with a unique college major in aesthetic studies (including areas like criticism, creative writing, film, photography and crafts which were not covered by the more traditional boards of study). Porter has long been a center for fine and performing arts. The college complex includes three active galleries, the History of Art and Visual Culture department, and various spaces in the complex have frequently been used for musical, theatrical, and dance performances. It also features a koi pond and cherry tree garden.

Although designed as a traditional dormitory with a centralized dining hall, Porter soon gained a reputation befitting their artistic background by staging outrageously bohemian parties, including Halloween, "Step on My Face", "The End" (initially understood as "The End of the World," but also in response to the changing of the name of the college from College Five to Porter, later revised to "The End of the School Year," or "The Edge of the World," and now "Porterpalooza"), and, for a time, a parodistic Prom ("for all those who missed their High School Proms"). "Queer Fashion Show," formerly "Alternative Fashion Show" is a current annual program featuring student made fashion and a variety show. Porter is now also the home to several apartment buildings that are available to second year students and upper classmen. Currently, Freshmen and new Transfer students are not allowed to apply to live in the Porter Apartments.

While personnel surveillance is strong in the dormitory and adjoining quad area, rarely do CSOs or RAs patrol the Porter Meadow. Consequently, the Porter meadow is the primary spot for students smoking, drinking, or making noise in moderate to large groups.

=== Traditions ===
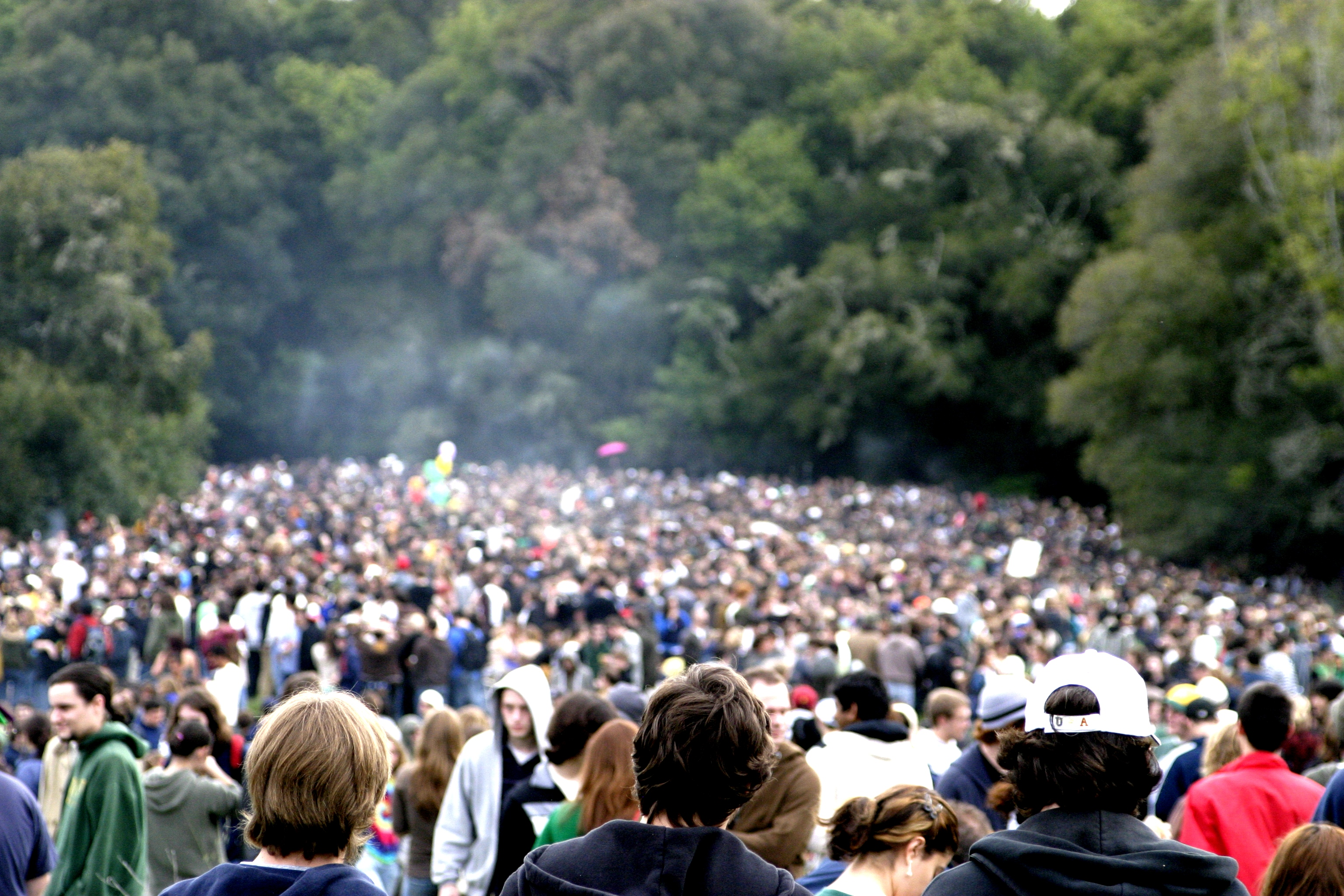
A crowd gathered at Porter meadow on April 20, 2007

In the same vein, many students from this college take part in the First Rain yearly tradition, which is celebrated when the first rain of the Fall quarter falls. Students run naked through all colleges, much to the amusement of other students, to return to Porter College for warm showers. This tradition may have developed from a naked "walkabout" where roughly 50 Porterians and students from Kresge and (then) College 8 walked the colleges naked in October 1989 in part to relieve the stress of the 1989 Loma Prieta earthquake. The quake cancelled classes for days and UCSC students were left with little to do for distraction.

Though Porter College's reputation is associated with outrageous parties, bohemian lifestyles, and uninhibited artistic expression, presently the atmosphere at the college is much more subdued than in the past. Today, there are fewer Art majors at UCSC and thus fewer affiliated with Porter than in its earlier days. UCSC has also forced this break from reputation through stricter regulation and disciplinary action involving event planning, noise, lewdness, and drug policies. Like all colleges of UC Santa Cruz, these regulations are enforced by Coordinators for Residential Education (CREs), Residential Advisors (RAs), and Campus Security Officers (CSO). CREs live in the dormitory buildings and are responsible for discipline following campus policy violations as well as offering assistance and guidance to Porter students. RAs, college students living in the dorms, and CSOs, trained and hired personnel, patrol Porter College offering assistance in emergencies or writing referrals for policy violation.

=== Transfer Community ===
Porter College is also home to the Transfer Community. Using sections of both the large A and B buildings, the Transfer Community theme is home to nearly all transfer students who live on campus, regardless of college affiliation. Like most residential halls, the standard room option is a triple room with age-appropriate roommates. The addition of the Transfer Community has also greatly changed the culture and traditional arts-focus of Porter College as most of the transfer students are affiliated with other colleges.

=== Landmarks ===
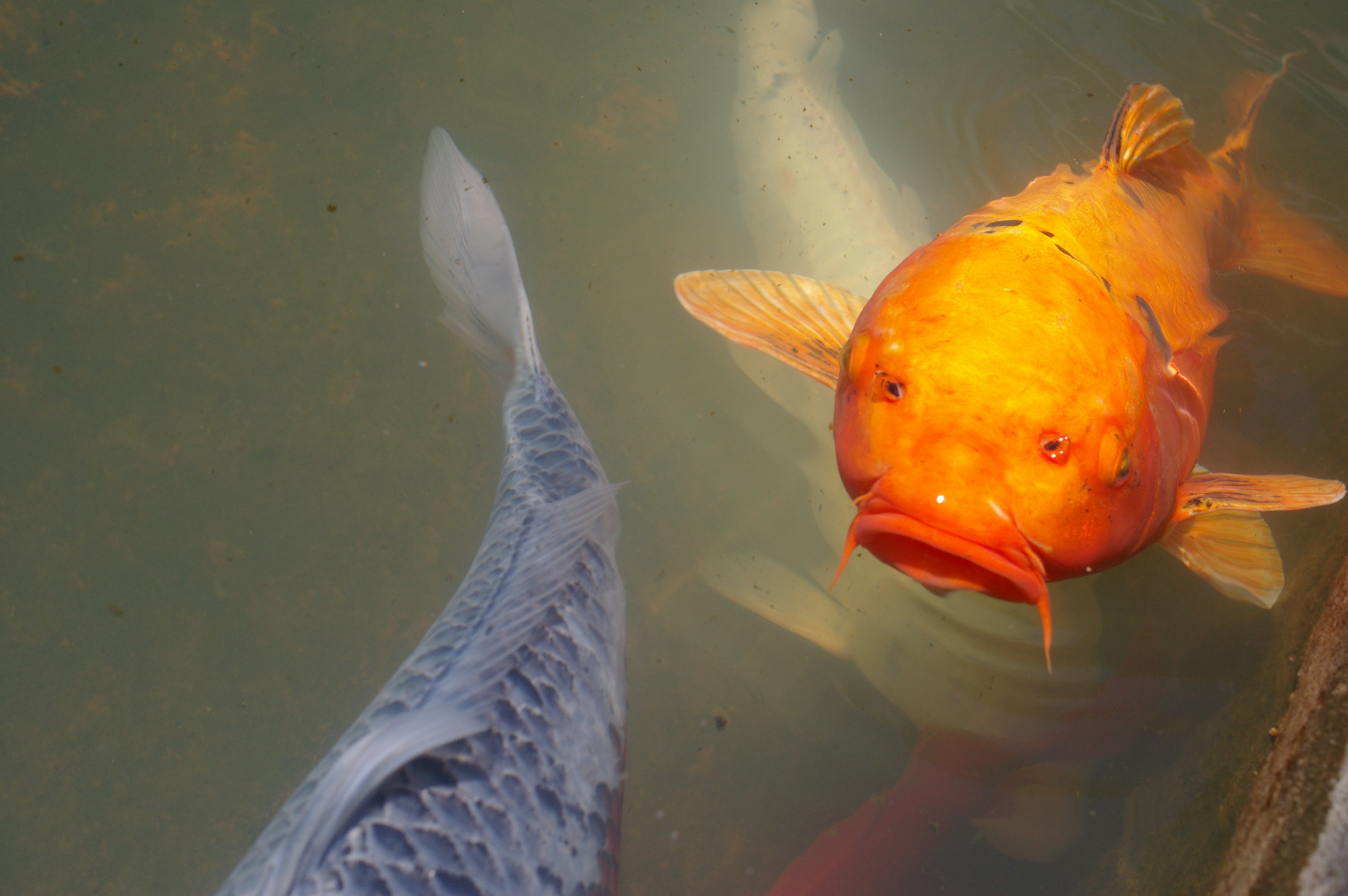
Koi at Porter Koi Pond

Just to the south of Porter is a signature campus art piece, a large red abstract sculpture which has been endlessly portrayed on UCSC's promotional literature. It is known on campus as "The Squiggle," "The Flying IUD" and "The Porter Wave" in official literature, but is officially "Untitled." Students often gather at this sculpture to play guitar, to watch the sunset, or to even drum on the sculpture itself. On Sundays students gather to participate in a mass Live-Action Role Playing, or LARPING.

Nearby the college is Empire Cave (and others in Cave Gulch, across Empire Grade from the campus) and Porter Meadow, which are popular local attractions. Empire Cave is notable for being the endemic stomping grounds of the Empire Cave Pseudoscorpion, the population of these arachnids being so small and isolated as to be primarily threatened by intrepid explorers, foolhardy party-goers, and psychedelic nomads looking for a "trip."

The Porter Dining Hall is one of five dining halls on campus and is known to host events throughout the year. Fridays during the hot months of the year, Porter hosts its "Patio Party", inviting students across campus to enjoy BBQ, "mocktails" and music.

== Dining ==
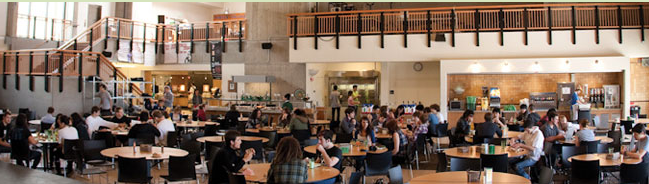
Porter/ Kresge Dining Hall

The closest dining hall is the Kresge/Porter dining hall in Porter College, with the Porter Market (previously known as the Hungry Slug, and before that a worker's collective called Sluggo's Pizza) adjacent to the dining hall. The servery offers chef-customized traditional style entrees, signature salads, and pizzas. The dining hall is well known for having a variety of vegetarian and vegan options and also has a wonderful outside deck with a view of the adjacent Porter meadow and the Monterey Bay ocean view.
