= Oakes College =

Residential college of the University of California, Santa Cruz

Coordinates: 36.98925°N 122.06433°W

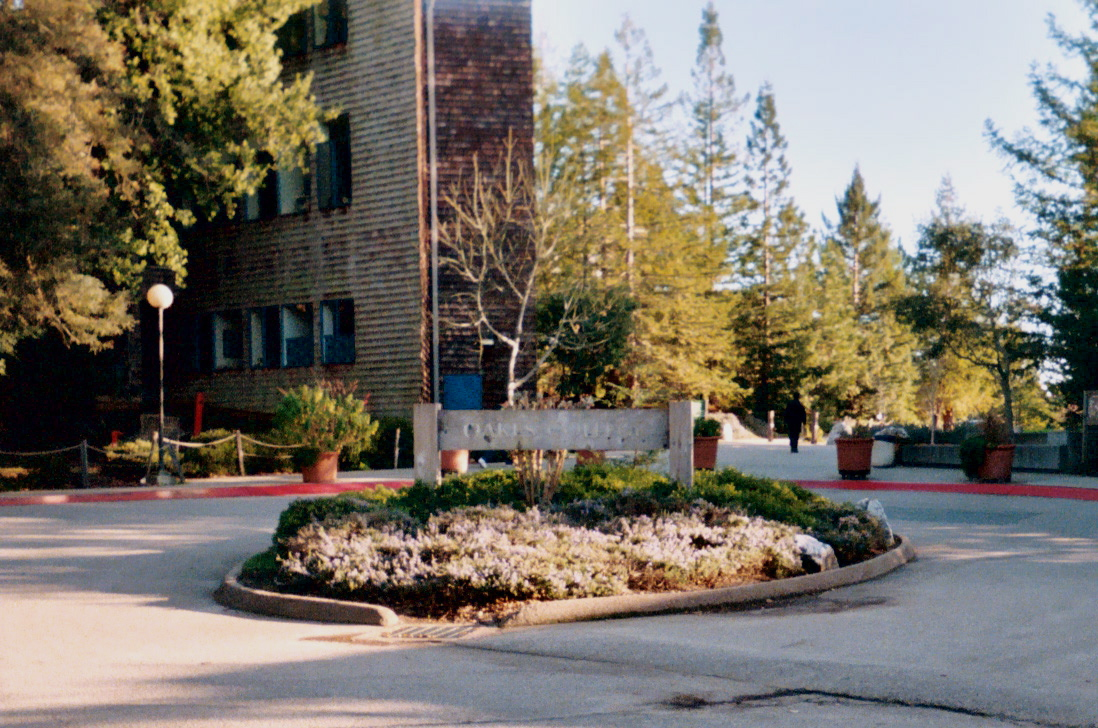
- Motto: Fiat Lux
- Type: Residential college
- Established: 1972
- Provost: Marcia Ochoa
- Undergraduates: 1312
- Location: University of California; 1156 High Street; Santa Cruz, CA 95064, Santa Cruz, California, United States
- Campus: Suburban and sylvan
- Colors: UCSC blue UCSC gold
- Nickname: Oakies
- Website: www.oakes.ucsc.edu

Oakes College is a residential college at the University of California, Santa Cruz. It is on the southwestern corner of the campus, south of Rachel Carson College and east of the Family Student Housing Complex.

Oakes was founded in 1972 as College Seven by Professors Herman J. Blake and Ralph C. Guzmán. In 1968, the Black Liberation Front, a black power group, demanded an all-black college. Blake, UCSC's only African American faculty member at the time, along with Guzmán, one of the few Mexican-American faculty on campus, proposed a compromise in which College Seven's academic program would focus on ethnic studies, particularly the studies of minority groups in California. Though the term ethnic studies was dropped in the planning phases, the college has always stressed racial, ethnic and cultural diversity, along with the representation and support of students from historically disadvantaged groups.

Oakes is perceived by some students as a "minority college", partly due to its roots in radical elements of the Civil Rights Movement. Comparative racial and ethnic statistics do show that Oakes' student body has slightly higher percentages of minorities than a number of other UCSC colleges and UCSC's student body as a whole. For example, 9.8% of Oakes's students are African American and 12.2% are Filipino American, compared with 2.7% and 4.5%, respectively, among UCSC's general student body.

College Seven was renamed Oakes in 1975 after philanthropists Roscoe and Margaret Oakes, whose endowment contributed significantly to the founding of the college.

Noted political activist Angela Davis, an Oakes affiliate, is a professor of history of consciousness, an unconventional program centering on the history of struggles for racial, economic and social justice and equality.

== Theme housing ==
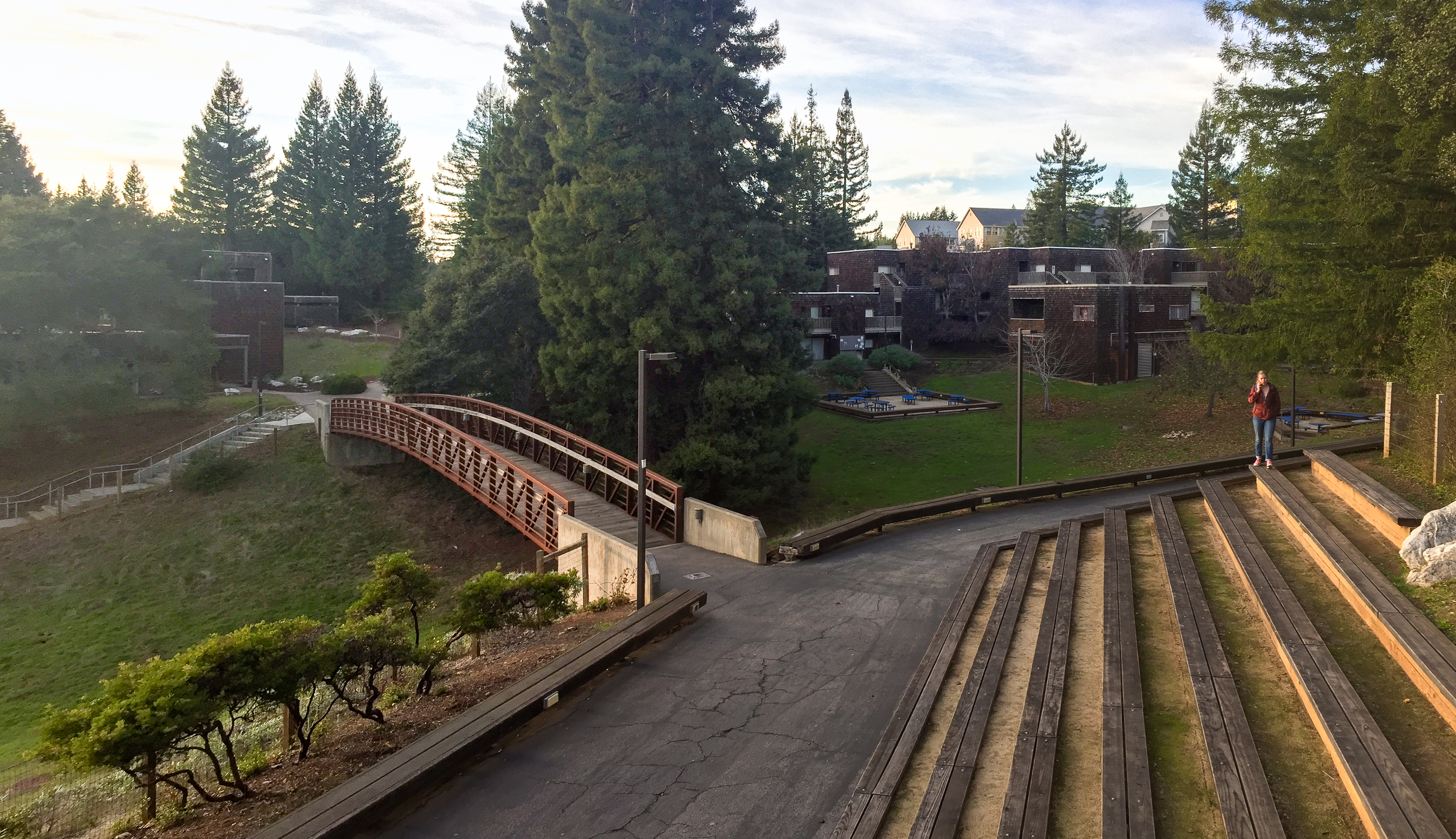
The amphitheater steps and Oakes Bridge serve as a crossroads between the academic and residential halves of Oakes College.

Oakes College provides theme housing for their students that want to live on campus. There are four dormitory buildings and four apartment blocks.

=== Dormitory buildings ===
Biko House – African American theme and STEM Community
Hong-Lim House - Asian American/Pacific Islander themes
Bayit Wiesel - Jewish, GLBTI themes
Casa Huerta - Chicano/Latino theme

=== Apartment blocks ===
Casa Kahlo - Chicano/Latino Theme
Shabazz Block - African American Theme
Milk Block - Jewish, GLBTI Themes
Lili'uokalani Minami Block - Asian American/Pacific Islander Themes
