= Scarfe =

Scarfe may refer to:

== People ==
- Alan Scarfe (1946–2024), British Canadian actor
- Alan Scarfe (bishop) (born 1950), American Episcopal bishop
- Colin D. Scarfe (born 1940), Canadian astronomer; namesake of asteroid Scarfe
- David Scarfe (born 1960), Australian cyclist
- Dougie Scarfe, director of Bournemouth Symphony Orchestra, Bournemouth, England, UK
- Fergus Scarfe, a British TV executive for GOD TV
- Francis Scarfe (1911–1986), British poet and novelist
- Frederick Scarfe, mayor of Dartmouth, Nova Scotia, Canada (1902–1905)
- George Scarfe (1826–1903), British Australian merchant
- Gerald Scarfe (born 1936), British cartoonist and illustrator
- Janet Scarfe (born 1947), Australian historian and activist
- Jonathan Scarfe (born 1975), Canadian actor
- Laurence Scarfe (1914–1993), British artist and designer
- Lyndon Scarfe, member of the British band The Danse Society
- Neville V. Scarfe, President of the National Council for Geographic Education (USA)
- Norman Scarfe (1923–2014), British historian
- Peter Scarfe, Australian sailor, who competed in the 1963 International Catamaran Challenge Trophy
- Richard Scarfe, member of the British band Tight Fit
- Warren Scarfe (1936–1964), Australian cyclist
- Wendy Scarfe (born 1933), Australian poet, novelist and biographer
- William J. Scarfe, mayor of Brantford, Ontario, Canada (1884–1885)

== Fictional characters ==
- Guerline Scarfe, from the 2017 novella Matters Arising from the Identification of the Body by Simon Petrie
- John Scarfe, from the 1842 novel The Miser's Daughter by William Harrison Ainsworth
- Patrick Scarfe, from the 1980 film Any Which Way You Can
- Rafael Scarfe, a Marvel Comics character, a fictional NYPD police lieutenant
  - Rafe Scarfe, a fictional vigilante, a version of the Marvel Comics character appearing with Stiletto
  - Rafael Scarfe (Marvel Cinematic Universe), a fictional police detective, a Marvel Comics character in the MCU

== Places ==
- 6532 Scarfe, the asteroid Scarfe, the 6532nd asteroid registered
- Scarfe Township, Algoma District, Northeastern Ontario, Ontario, Canada; see Canoe Lake (Scarfe Township)

=== Fictional locations ===
- Scarfe's World, a fictional planet from the eponymous 1965 novelette Scarfe's World by Brian Aldiss

== See also ==
- Harris Scarfe, an Australian retailer, formerly 'George P. Harris, Scarfe & Co.'
- Scarfies, a 1999 New Zealand black comedy film
- Scarfie, a student at the University of Otago, Dunedin, Otago, South Island, New Zealand
- Scarf (disambiguation)
