= Jocelyn Goldfein =

American technology executive and investor

- Education: Stanford University
- Occupations: Technology executive, software engineer, investor

Jocelyn Goldfein is an American technology executive, software engineer, and investor. She is the managing director and a general partner at venture capital firm Zetta Venture Partners. Previously she was a director of engineering at Facebook and vice president of engineering at VMware.

== Biography ==
Goldfein attended Stanford University and graduated with a bachelor's degree in computer science in 1997. After college, Goldfein started her career at Trilogy. Later, she spent seven years at VMware, eventually becoming vice president of engineering. While at VMware, she worked on their core virtualization offering and began their desktop business. She moved on to become director of engineering at Facebook where her teams worked on several features, including news feed and search. She is the managing director and a general partner at venture capital firm Zetta Venture Partners, as well as a guest lecturer at Stanford University, angel investor, and advisor. She is a member of the board of Harvey Mudd College.

She spoke at the Grace Hopper Celebration of Women in Computing in 2012, and delivered a keynote address at Women 2.0's HowTo conference in 2014. In 2017, she was named to Business Insider's list of "43 Most Powerful Female Engineers."

== Awards and acknowledgements ==
- America's Top 50 Women in Tech, Forbes, Dec. 1, 2018
