= Ralph C. Guzmán =

Deputy Assistant

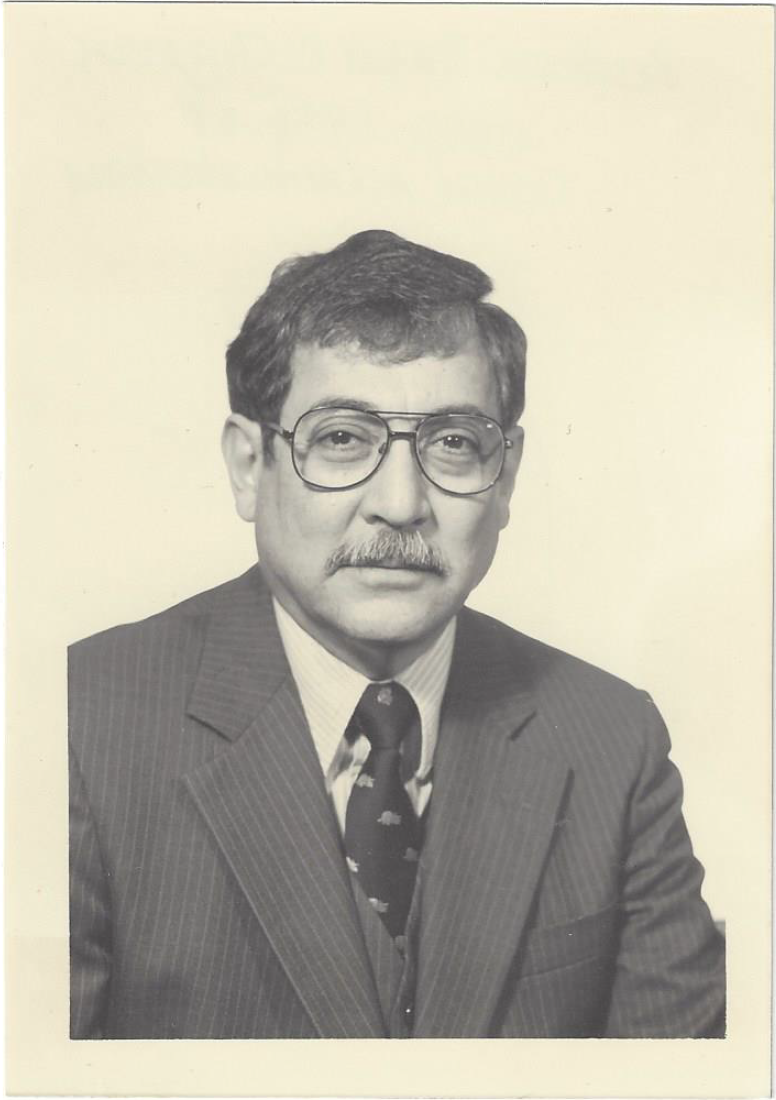
Ralph C. Guzman

Ralph C. Guzmán (October 24,1924-October 10, 1985, born Rafael Cortez Guzmán) served as Deputy Assistant Secretary of State of Latin America in the Carter Administration and was one of the nation's leading Latino educators. He co-founded the Oakes College at the University of California, Santa Cruz and later was appointed Provost at UCSC's Merrill College. Guzmán played an influential role in the early years of the Chicano Movement, and was a key figure in the Mexican-American community nationwide. During his time in the State Department, he was responsible for formulating and implementing much of the nation's policy in Central and South America.

== Early life and education ==
Born in Moroleón, Guanajuato in 1924, Rafael Cortez Guzmán immigrated to the U.S. as a child during the Depression, and worked for several years with his family in the fields of the Southwest before settling in East Los Angeles. He served in the Merchant Marines and Navy during World War II, participating in the final assault on Okinawa, and returned to complete an A.A. at East Los Angeles Junior College under the G.I. Bill in 1949.

After the war, he enrolled at California State University, Los Angeles, where he earned bachelor's (1958) and master's (1960) degrees in political science. In 1955 he was named director of the Alianza Hispano-Americana's (a Mexican American fraternal insurance society) newly founded civil rights department, where he cultivated his skill in developing community support organizations. Along with Fred Ross Sr. and Congressman Edward R. Roybal, Guzmán assisted in the founding of the Community Service Organization in the Los Angeles area.

Following three years spent serving as Associate Director of the Peace Corps contingents in Venezuela and Peru, Guzmán returned to Los Angeles and became one of the few Chicano graduate students (and first to receive a Ph.D. in political science) at University of California, Los Angeles. There, while completing his studies, he was appointed a director of the Mexican-American Study Project, and helped develop The Mexican Americans: Our Second Minority (NY, 1970).

== Research and legacy ==
Guzmán's research, put forth in The Mexican Americans: Our Second Minority, was essential to the Chicano Anti-Vietnam Movement. His researched showed that disproportionate numbers of Latino Americans were dying in the war.

Guzman drew his conclusions from US military records and the surnames of the casualties, identifying Spanish surnames as Latinos. Recently, Pomona College historian Tomas Summers Sandoval revisited Guzman's work using more thoroughly tested surnames lists and confirmed Guzmán's conclusions.

In the 2015 PBS documentary On Two Fronts: Latinos & Vietnam, which examines the Latino experience during the Vietnam War, Sandoval says in an interview, "The Chicano Anti Vietnam War Movement does not exist without the research of Ralph Guzman. He is the verifiable proof of their common sense understanding that this war was disproportionately affecting our community."
