= Goldfine =

Goldfine is a surname. Notable people with the surname include:

- Andy Goldfine (born 1954), American businessman
- Bernard Goldfine (1880s/1890s – 1967), American businessman
- Dean Goldfine (born 1965), American tennis player and coach

== See also ==
- Goldfein
