= Rachel Carson College =

Residential college of the University of California, Santa Cruz

Coordinates: 36.99117°N 122.06497°W

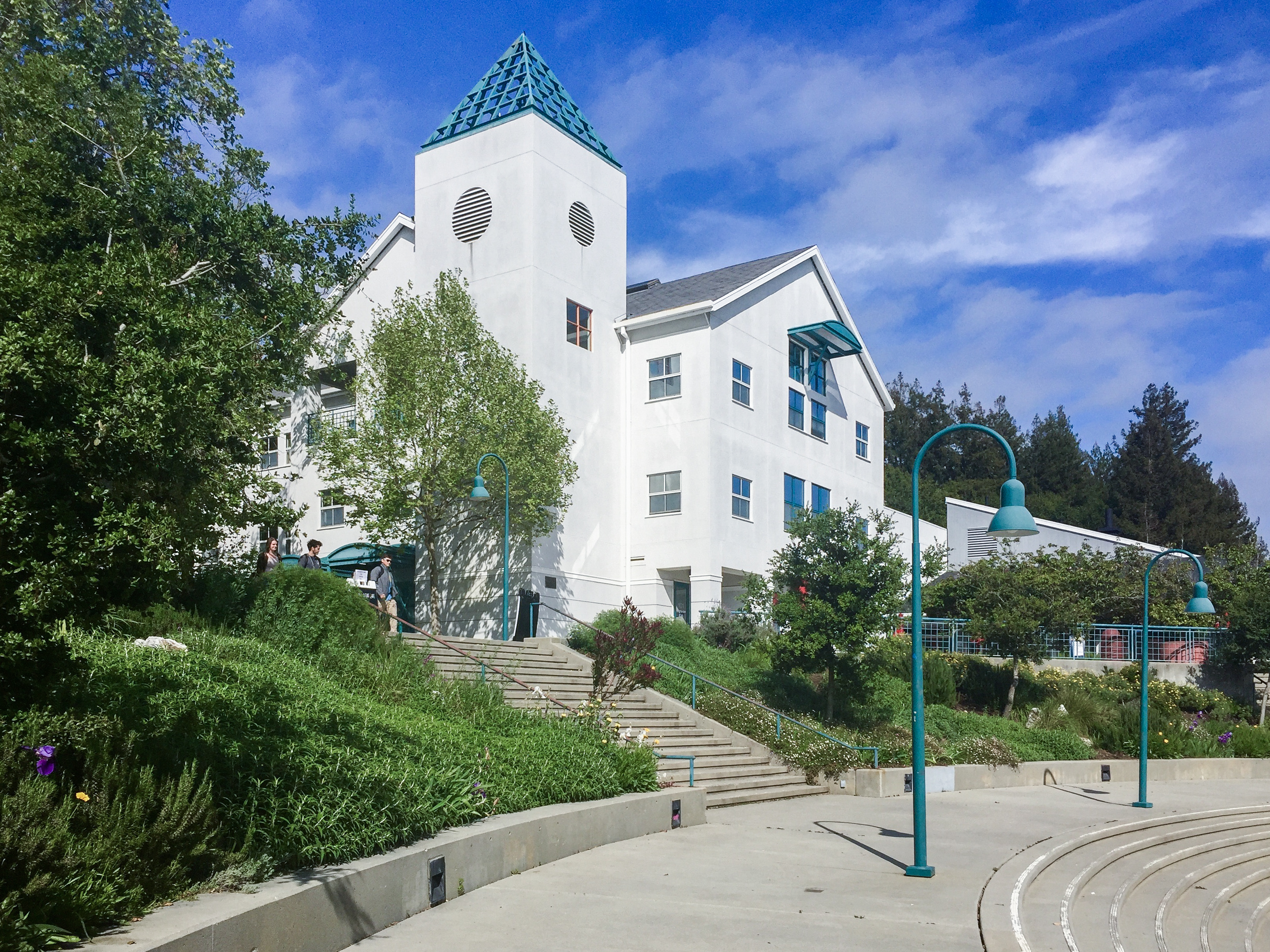
- Motto: Environment and Society
- Type: Residential college
- Established: 1972
- Location: University of California; 1156 High Street; Santa Cruz, CA 95064, Santa Cruz, California
- Campus: Suburban/Sylvan
- Colors: UCSC Blue; UCSC Gold
- Website: www.rachelcarson.ucsc.edu/

Rachel Carson College is a residential college at the University of California, Santa Cruz. Named in honor of conservationist Rachel Carson, it is on the west side of campus, north of Oakes College and southeast of Porter College. The current provost of the college is Professor Sue Carter, also a faculty member of UCSC's Physics Department. The theme of its freshman core course is Environment and Society.

== History ==
Rachel Carson College was founded in 1972 as College Eight at the current location of the Kerr Hall lecture building. Before it moved to its present location in 1990, College Eight was the only UCSC college that did not have its own on-campus housing; residential students were then housed at the Porter College residence halls. At the time, its focus was on transfer students, who are usually less likely to live on campus than students on a traditional four-year course.

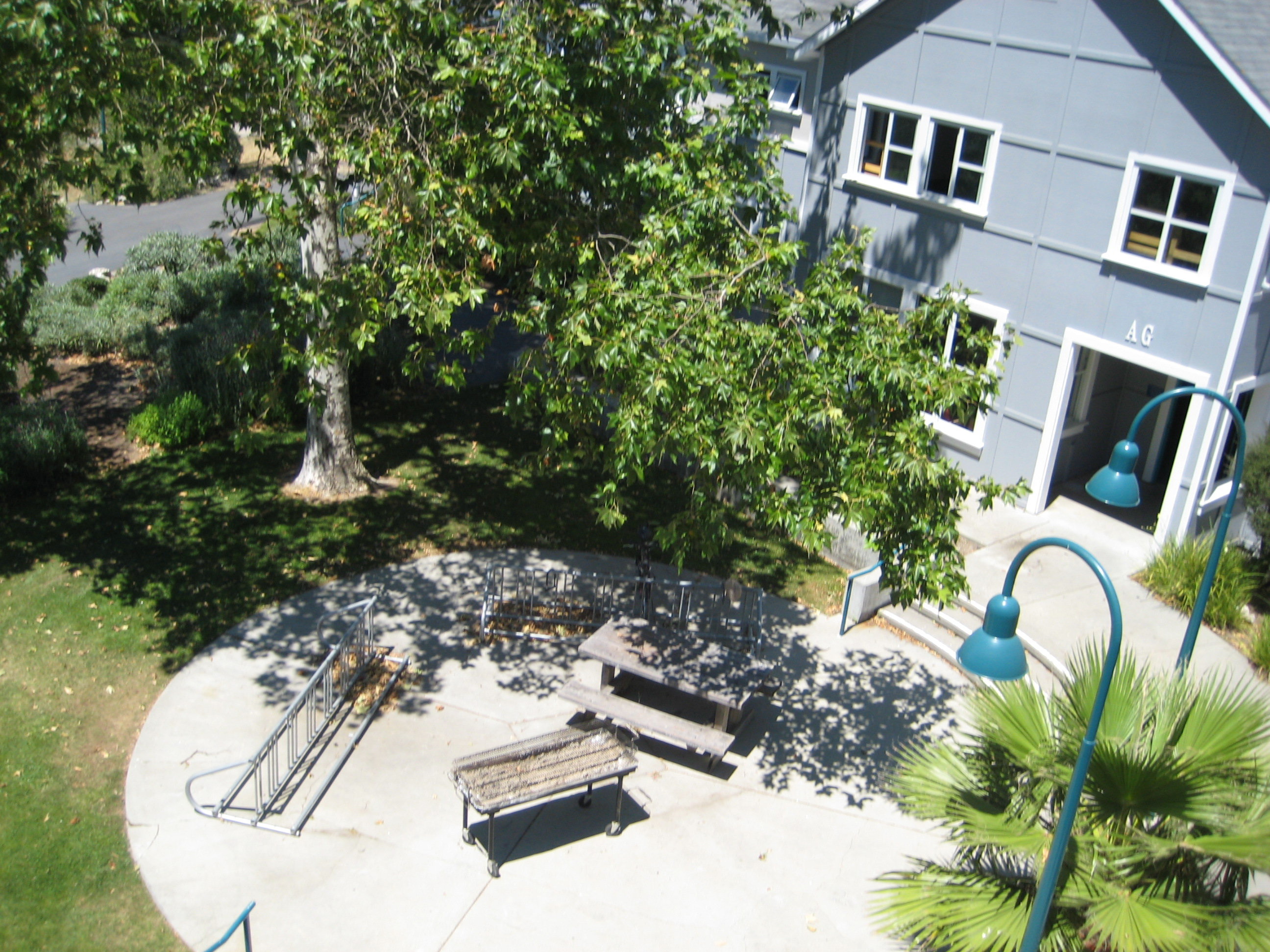
The quad of Rachel Carson College's residence halls

On September 15, 2016, it was announced that the former College Eight would be named Rachel Carson College, with the help of an endowment from the Helen and Will Webster Foundation.

== Freshman core class ==
Rachel Carson College's freshman core class, Environment and Society, "examines education, identity, nature, community, livelihood, and livability at local and national levels as contemporary global transformations affect them." (All Rachel Carson College freshmen must take it, but transfer students are exempt if they have more than 45 credits.) The course has been expanded to a year, the first quarter being an overview of environmental issues with an emphasis on social sciences and environmental justice, the second providing a strong grounding in biological and atmospheric issues (along with empirical and quantitative methods), and the final course emphasizes creative hands-on solutions, particularly in terms of energy issues. These provide the foundation for a new social entrepreneur initiative.
