= Eric Howlett =

American inventor (1926-2011)

- Born: Eric Mayorga Howlett; December 27, 1926; Miami, Florida
- Died: December 11, 2011 (aged 84)
- Education: MIT
- Occupation: Inventor

Eric Mayorga Howlett (December 27, 1926 – December 11, 2011) was the inventor of the LEEP (Large Expanse Extra Perspective), extreme wide-angle stereoscopic optics used in photographic and virtual reality systems.

According to Wayne Carlson, professor of design at Ohio State University, in 2005:

"The Large Expanse, Extra Perspective (LEEP) optical system was designed by Eric Howlett in 1979 and provides the basis for most of the current virtual reality helmets available today. The combined system gave a very wide field of view stereoscopic image. The users of the system have been impressed by the sensation of depth [field of view] in the scene and the corresponding realism. The original LEEP system was redesigned [used] for the NASA Ames Research Center in 1985 for their first virtual reality installation, the VIEW (Virtual Interactive Environment Workstation) by Scott Fisher."

== Early life and education ==
Howlett was born in Miami, Florida, and raised on Long Island, New York, where he attended the progressive Roslyn High School. His mother, Margaret Mayorga, was the author of A Short History of the American Drama, which had been her master's thesis and which became a standard reference in libraries. She originated and edited The Best One-Act Plays of 19xx, an annual series published variously by Dodd, Mead & Company, Samuel French and Little Brown from 1937 to 1961. Eric had no siblings and was encouraged very early by his mother, who recognized his talent in math and science. She moved several times to ensure he would attend the best public school available at that time. As a senior in high school he was one of 40 Westinghouse Science Talent Search finalists, meeting Eleanor Roosevelt at the White House in 1944. He also received a full scholarship from Grumman Aircraft to any college or university in the country. He chose MIT, but left to serve in the US Navy from 1944 to 1946, returning to MIT and graduating in 1949 with a BSc in Physics. He lived in the Boston area for most of his adult life (Newton, Massachusetts and Acton, Massachusetts).

== Career ==
1949 to 1952 — After graduating from MIT, Howlett supported himself and a wife and daughter by creating his first enterprise, repairing TV sets in the home, and by designing and building electronic prototypes—one of which had a proximity detector that caused a dummy to talk to you in a store when you walked up to it.

1952 to 1957 — Staff member at MIT's Lincoln Laboratory working on cross-correlation radar.

1957 to 1960 — General Electric heavy military electronics in Syracuse, NY, as an engineer, traveling worldwide to trouble shoot and educate operators of an early warning radar system. (BMEWS)

1960 — Returned to Boston to become Marketing Manager of Adage, Incorporated, eventually assuming the roles of engineering manager and director of research. Howlett's second enterprise was a mail-order business, wherein he launched dozens of products on The New York Times' mail order page, one of which (a plastic organizer tray) was successful (made a profit), but it was not profitable enough. In 1962, he went to work as Marketing Manager for Di/An Controls, inc. a Boston manufacturer of space-borne magnetic memories.

1964 to 1968 — Founder and president of NUMEX, a company based on a novel high quality numerical projection readout device that was made obsolete by segmented displays.

1968 to 1978 — Consulting, prototyping and light manufacturing of optics and electronics for Boston-area firms.

1978 — Invented an extremely wide angle stereoscopic photographic system based on camera lenses that introduced aberrations on the film to neutralize aberrations required in the viewer to get the extremely wide field. A patent for the system, called by the trade name LEEP, was granted in 1983.

1980 to 1990 — Operated a proprietorship, POP-OPTIX LABS with revenue from consulting and manufacture of custom optical and electronic devices. The LEEP viewing optics were used in theme park attractions and almost all of the Virtual Reality Headsets (Head-Mounted Displays, or HMDs) sold in the 1980s.

1991 — Founded and operated LEEP Systems, Inc. to market wide angle telepresence and virtual reality systems for research and for medical and military purposes.

2006 — Co-founded LeepVR, Ltd., with his son Alex.
