= Cary Lu =

American writer (1945–1997)

- Born: December 4, 1945; Qingdao, Shandong, China
- Died: September 23, 1997 (aged 51)
- Occupation: Apple Macintosh specialist writer

Cary Lu (December 4, 1945 – September 23, 1997) was an American writer specializing in the Apple Macintosh platform.

== Early life ==
Born in Qingdao, China, Lu arrived in the United States at the age of three and grew up in California. He studied physics at University of California, Berkeley, and eventually earned a Ph.D. in biology from the California Institute of Technology.

== Television career ==
Lu worked in television for several years on projects for NBC and CBS News, developed short films for Sesame Street and other children's programs on PBS and was the science and technology editor for the Children's Television Workshop.

He was part of the group that started Nova for PBS and worked on science and technology education projects for the governments of Australia, Kenya, and Algeria.

== Writing career ==
Lu was a best-selling author of Macintosh-related books.

Possibly one of his most well-known works is The Apple Macintosh Book, the first edition of which was released almost simultaneously with the Macintosh 128K in 1984. The second edition covered the Macintosh 512K, while the third edition covered six Macintosh models in all. The fourth edition of the book (published in 1992) covered 21 models (including discontinued models, such as the Macintosh 128K), and even included mentions of the Macintosh Classic series, the Macintosh Quadra series, the PowerBooks, and System 7.

Lu was founding managing editor of High Technology, technology editor for Inc. and a columnist on future technology for Inc. Technology. He wrote columns and articles for Macworld magazine and other computer and technology publications.

His final book, The Race for Bandwidth: Understanding Data Transmission, was finished by friends, the technology writers Adam C. Engst and Stephen Manes, and published posthumously.

== Death and legacy ==
Cary Lu died of cancer at the age of 51.

While the first edition of Where Wizards Stay Up Late: The Origins of the Internet (1996) by Katie Hafner and Matthew Lyon was solely dedicated to J. C. R. Licklider, the 1998 edition was dedicated to Lu as well.

== Bibliography ==
- The Apple Macintosh Book
- E-World—The Official Guide for Macintosh Users
- The Race for Bandwidth: Understanding Data Transmission
