= Phil Scarf =

British statistician

Philip A. Scarf is Professor of Management Mathematics at Cardiff Business School, Cardiff University. He was formerly Professor of Applied Statistics at Salford Business School, University of Salford. A statistician, his interests are in modeling in sport, maintenance and reliability, and corrosion engineering. He advised the Press Association and the Football Association on the development of the Actim Index: the "official player rating system of the Premier League and Championship".

== Early life ==
He obtained his BSc from the University of Sheffield and PhD from the University of Manchester. His thesis concerned the statistical modelling of metallic corrosion, and the application of extreme value theory.

== Academic and research career ==
He was appointed as Professor of Applied Statistics by Salford in 2008.

He is the lead editor of the IMA Journal of Management Mathematics.
