= Boston Computer Society =

Personal computer user group, 1977–1996

Logo

The Boston Computer Society (BCS) was an organization of personal computer users, based in Boston, Massachusetts, U.S., that ran from 1977 to 1996. At one point, it was the largest such group in the world, with regular user group meetings, many publications, permanent offices in Boston, and hosting major product announcements, including the East Coast release of the Apple Macintosh in 1984.

== History ==
The organization was co-founded by thirteen-year-old Jonathan Rotenberg in 1977, and grew to become the largest such organization in the world, with over 30,000 members in all 50 U.S. states and 40 other countries. The other co-founder was Richard Gardner. Among the early members were many well-known names in the computer industry, including Stewart Alsop II, Daniel S. Bricklin, Philip D. Estridge, Dan Fylstra, William H. Gates, Wayne Green, Mitchell Kapor, Cary Lu, Mike Markkula, Seymour Papert, Jon Shirley, Clive Sinclair, Benjamin M. Rosen, and Nigel Searle. At its peak in the early 1990s, BCS supported more than 75 different user and special interest groups and held more than 150 monthly meetings.

Apple Computer Corp., Lotus Development and IBM made major product announcements at BCS meetings. For example, Apple made the East Coast introduction of the Apple Macintosh at a BCS meeting in 1984, and GO Corp. made the consumer introduction of PenPoint OS to BCS in 1991.

Update, the BCS magazine, was renamed "Computer Update" when Stewart Alsop became the publisher. (April 1982 issue, April 1987 10th anniversary issue)

There were a myriad of user groups meeting monthly with their own paper newsletters.

Much of the promotional and support role played by the organization became obsolete with the increasing sophistication of computer users and the growth of the Internet as an alternate source of information. Membership shrank to 18,000, they ran out of money, and BCS closed in October 1996.

== Milestones ==
1977: Founded in February by then 13-year-old Jonathan Rotenberg to be a resource for anyone to feel comfortable with computer technology, exchange information with fellow users, and learn from each other's successes and failures.

1978: Membership of 73. First mimeographed copy of BCS Update printed in November. First BCS telephone line installed - in Jonathan's bedroom. First meetings held in the Commonwealth School cafeteria.

1979: First BCS user group forums - for the Commodore PET computer. First BCS book published; a directory of local stores, consultants, and services. Membership: 300. VisiCalc introduced at BCS meeting by Bob Frankston and Dan Bricklin.

1980: The BCS is incorporated and rents a small downtown Boston office. First part-time employee hired as Jonathan leaves for Brown University. Membership at 1000 with nine user groups. BCS Update becomes Computer Update, a glossy 34-page magazine.

1980: April 1980 - The Apple/Boston user group becomes part of the Boston Computer society with Allen Sneider and Gary E. Haffer as the group's directors. Its first meeting was held in a hall in downtown Boston. Apple Boston created Applefest, the first conference dedicated to a single computer. Applefest eventually became known as Macworld. Allen Sneider then created the first Business User Group,(BUG) and later (HUG) Home User Group - education and entertainment for the family.

1981: First full-time employee hired. Official non-profit status granted. Calendar launched and cursor button logo adopted. Membership is growing rapidly.

1982: Membership grows to 3,000 with 13 user and special interest groups. Dues were $18. First electronic bulletin board started. IBM introduces its new personal computer in November with the group starting in January 1983. National media attention.

1983: Membership doubles to 6,300. Two more employees hired. 20 user and special interest groups. First regional chapter started in Providence, Rhode Island, under the auspices of the IBM Group.

1984: Office moves to larger office in same complex as membership hits 10,000. Resource Center opens. 29 user/special interest groups. First Buying Guide published. The Macintosh computer is introduced at a BCS meeting and the Mac Group starts. First Microsoft Windows group starts.

1985: Membership at 17,000 with 41 groups. Activist newsletter launched. The book Things the Manual Never Told You, co-written by many BCS activists, is published by Addison Wesley. Professional staff of seven employees.

1986: 50 user groups and 500 activists. First overseas affiliation with the Denmark Personal Computer Society. Calendar lists over 100 meetings and events each month. Membership is 23,000 with $35 annual

1987: Tenth Anniversary. A special 132-page Computer Update published. IBM and Mac Group open offices. Search begins for new BCS Center. Membership at 26,000 representing all 50 states and 40 countries.

1988: Membership goes over 30,000. Computer Update changes back to BCS Update. NeXT introduces its computer at one of the largest meetings ever with almost 3,000 people lined up at Symphony Hall in Boston. Calendar lists about 140 events. Public service initiatives begin.

1989: The Massachusetts Special Access Technology Center (MASTAC, an organization assisting disabled children and their teachers and families get access to computer technology, comes under the BCS umbrella. Membership peaks in June at 31,100 with dues at $40 for an individual membership. Over 20 electronic bulletin boards and 700 activists. Revenues over $2 million.

1990 Rotenberg moves from president to chairman. Tracy Licklider named president. Declining membership and local economics force scaleback of BCS Center. Membership at 26,800. Dues reduced to $39. Carolyn Coughlin (McDonough) was the first woman to found and lead a special interest group, The User Interface Design Group. In the first meeting, the team welcomed Margaret Minsky of MIT Media Lab, who discussed her work with haptic interface, adding the sense of touch and movement to games, and Eric Howlett, who demonstrated a Virtual Reality headset, to a standing room only crowd of 250 in Lotus Development Corp's Kendall Square headquarters. Despite the fact that approximately 1/10 members were women, the BCS was a leader in diversity, and in fact, in 1994, welcomed Pam Bybell to its presidency.

1991: BCS office moves to One Kendall Square in Cambridge. Membership shrinks to 24,400. IBM Group moves office to larger space with classrooms, still in Newton. Joint publications (BCS Tech, BCS Professionals, BCS Computers) launched. Licklider resigns; search for new president begins. Steve Jobs came back to demonstrate groundbreaking new software on the NeXT.

1992: Membership at 23,500. HP executive Bob Grenoble named president in May. Macintosh Group office moves from Somerville to Cambridge and their bulletin board logs its 500,000 call. At year-end employees numbered at 20 and activists topped 800. The Resource Center began providing daily access to members. Alliance formed with The World for Internet access. Member insurance and an unemployment service.

1993: Computer Update becomes a new flagship publication - BCS Magazine. Seventh annual MegaMeeting, CompuFest, and a Computers & Social Change Conference. President Bob Grenoble differs with BCS Activists as to BCS direction, tries to change computer platform emphasis - Mac, PC, Amiga, etc. Boston Globe quotes Grenoble as saying computers are not very useful to average person. Activists resist and call for Grenoble resignation at a public meeting.

1994: Grenoble resigns. Eighth annual MegaMeeting has 10,000 attendees, 150 exhibitors, 150 seminars and workshops. User group support director Pam Bybell becomes president.

1995: President and Board find it difficult to cut back staff and operation to meet declining membership and revenues.

1996: Pam Bybell resigns. Board votes to close BCS.

[Milestone source to 1993: BCS Activist - Special Edition 1993 Newsletter]

== User Groups ==
BCS had scores of separate User Groups. As an example, in Spring 1993 the list included:

Alpha Four; Amateur Radio; Amiga; Apple II; Andover Chapter; Artificial Intelligence; Atari 8-bit and ST; Business; CAD-SIG; Cape Cod Chapter; CASE; Commodore; Computers & Speech; Construction; Consultants & Entrepreneurs; Databases; Desktop Publishing; Digital; Disabled/ Special Needs; Education; Environmental; Hewlett Packard; IBM; Internet; Investment/Real Estate; Legal; Lotus; Macintosh; MacTechGroup; Medical/Dental; Music; New Media; Networking/Electronic Mail; Newton; NeXT; OS/2; Portable Computers; Robotics; Science/Engineering; Programming; Social Impact; Telecommunications; Texas Instruments; TI Pro; Training & Documentation; User Interface Design; Virtual Reality; Visually Impaired; Windows; Women and Computers; Worcester Chapter; ZITEL

== Publications ==
Monthly

- Computer Update - later BCS Magazine
- The Active Window (Macintosh)
- Amiga Culture (Commodore Amiga)
- PC Report (IBM PC)
- Thinking Technology (Artificial Intelligence)
- BCS Professionals
- BCS Computers
- BCS Tech

Quarterly

- ApplePress (Apple II)
- Impact (Social Impact)
- Look 'n Feel (Accessibility)
- New Media News (New Media)
- Online Connection (Telecommunications)
- The Schoolhouse Monitor (Education/Logo)
- Interface (User Interface Design Group)

Periodically

- The Software Spectrum PD-CD for Macintosh "The definitive collection of public domain and shareware software—more than 600 megabytes—from the definitive Macintosh User Group."
