= Commonwealth School =

Coordinates: 42°21′16.14″N 71°04′42.43″W

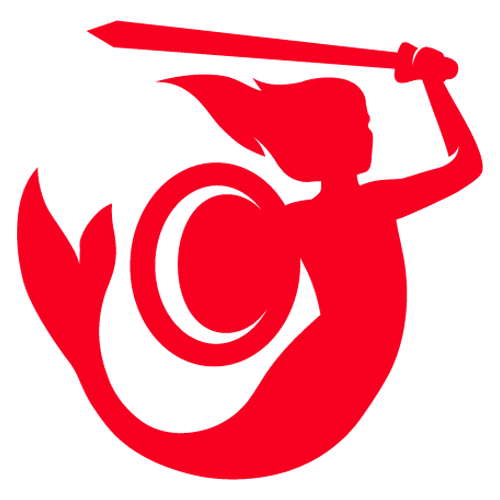

Location
- 151 Commonwealth Avenue; Boston, Massachusetts 02116; United States

Information
- Type: Private; Independent
- Motto: Uncommon community. Uncommon curiosity. Uncommon opportunity.
- Established: 1957
- Founder: Charles E. Merrill, Jr.
- CEEB code: 220222
- Head of School: Jennifer Borman
- Grades: 9–12
- Gender: Co-educational
- Enrollment: 163 (2025-2026)
- Student to teacher ratio: 5:1
- Campus: Back Bay
- Colors: Red and white
- Song: "The Spacious Firmament"
- Athletics conference: NEPSAC: Massachusetts Bay Independent League (boys); Girls Independent League
- Mascot: Imogene the Mermaid
- Nickname: Mermaids
- Accreditation: New England Association of Schools and Colleges
- Newspaper: The Chronicle; Helicon (literary)
- Tuition: $60,075 (for 2025-2026 school year)
- Average Financial Aid Grant: $46,260 (for 2025-2026 school year)
- Total Financial Aid Granted: $1.8M (for 2025-2026 school year)
- Range of Financial Aid Grants: $6,900-$54,900 (for 2023-2024 school year)
- Website: commschool.org
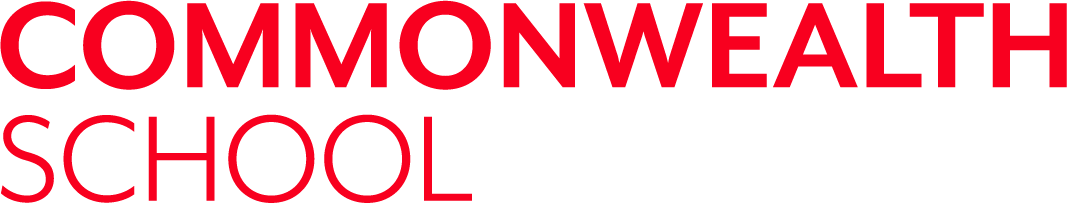

Commonwealth School, often referred to simply as Commonwealth, is a private, co-educational high school of about 160 students and 35 faculty members located in the downtown Back Bay neighborhood of Boston, Massachusetts, United States. It is accredited by the New England Association of Schools and Colleges.

== History ==
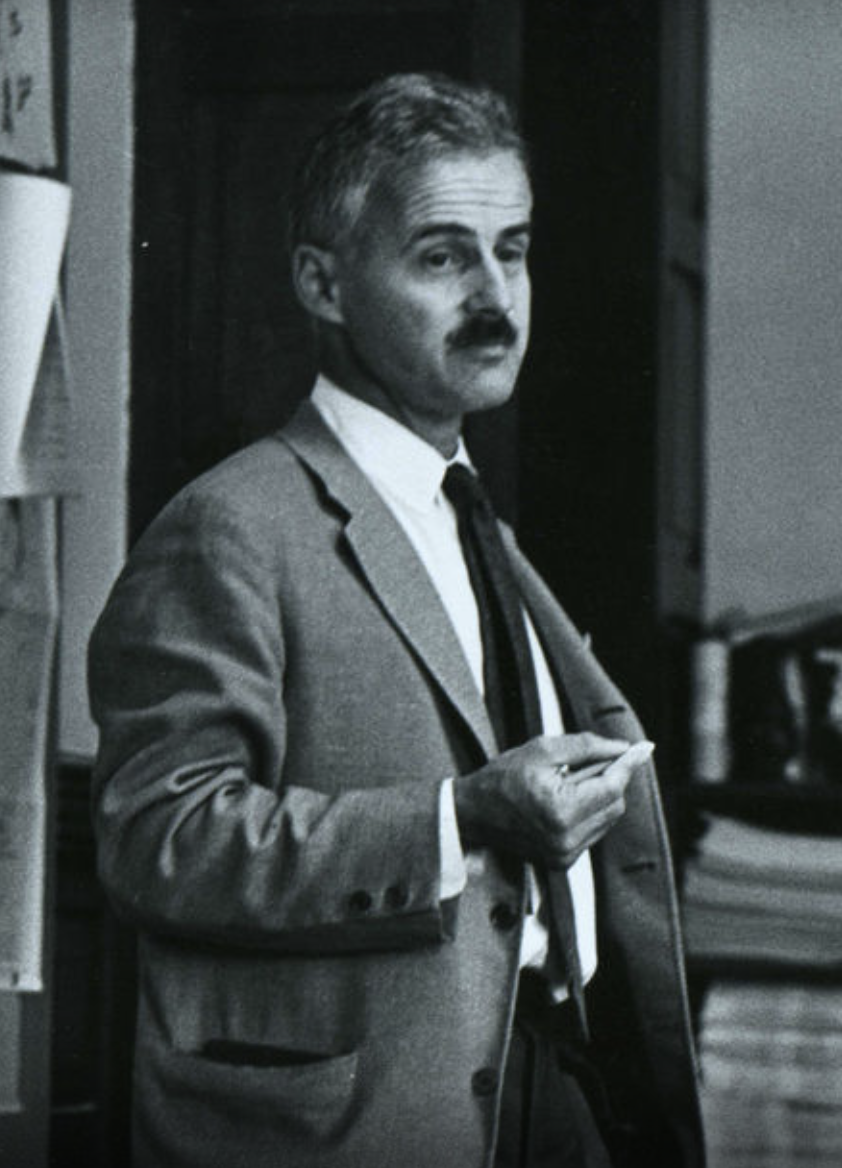
Charles E. Merrill, Jr., the founder of Commonwealth

Charles E. Merrill, Jr., son of the founder of Merrill Lynch, and brother of the prominent American poet James Merrill, founded the school in 1957, locating it in Boston's Back Bay to "restore good secondary schooling to the city." The school's name is derived directly from the official Commonwealth of Massachusetts and its namesake Commonwealth Avenue that stretches across downtown Boston, which the school resides on. Merrill encouraged Commonwealth students to be "decent, socially responsible, generous people," actively engaged in public affairs. For some decades after his retirement, Merrill returned to the school once a year to give a speech on a topic of his choice, and his books are on display in the school library alongside those of Commonwealth alumni.

Merrill insisted that the school has only one rule: "No rollerskating in the halls,"—an exhortation that students should not "act like a damn fool, but think about your actions and how they affect others." While the school keeps a student handbook, this has prevailed as the school's only official rule since its foundation and embodies the school's core value of student engagement and responsibility.

Merrill retired in 1981, and his memoir of the first 23 years of the school's history and his experience as headmaster, The Walled Garden, was published the following year.

== Heads of school ==
There have been six heads of school:

- 1957–1981: Charles E. Merrill, Jr.
- 1981–1983: Joseph "Jay" Featherstone
- 1983–1990: Charles Chatfield
- 1990–2000: Judith Keenan
- 2000–2021: William Wharton
- 2021–present: Jennifer Borman

== Academics ==
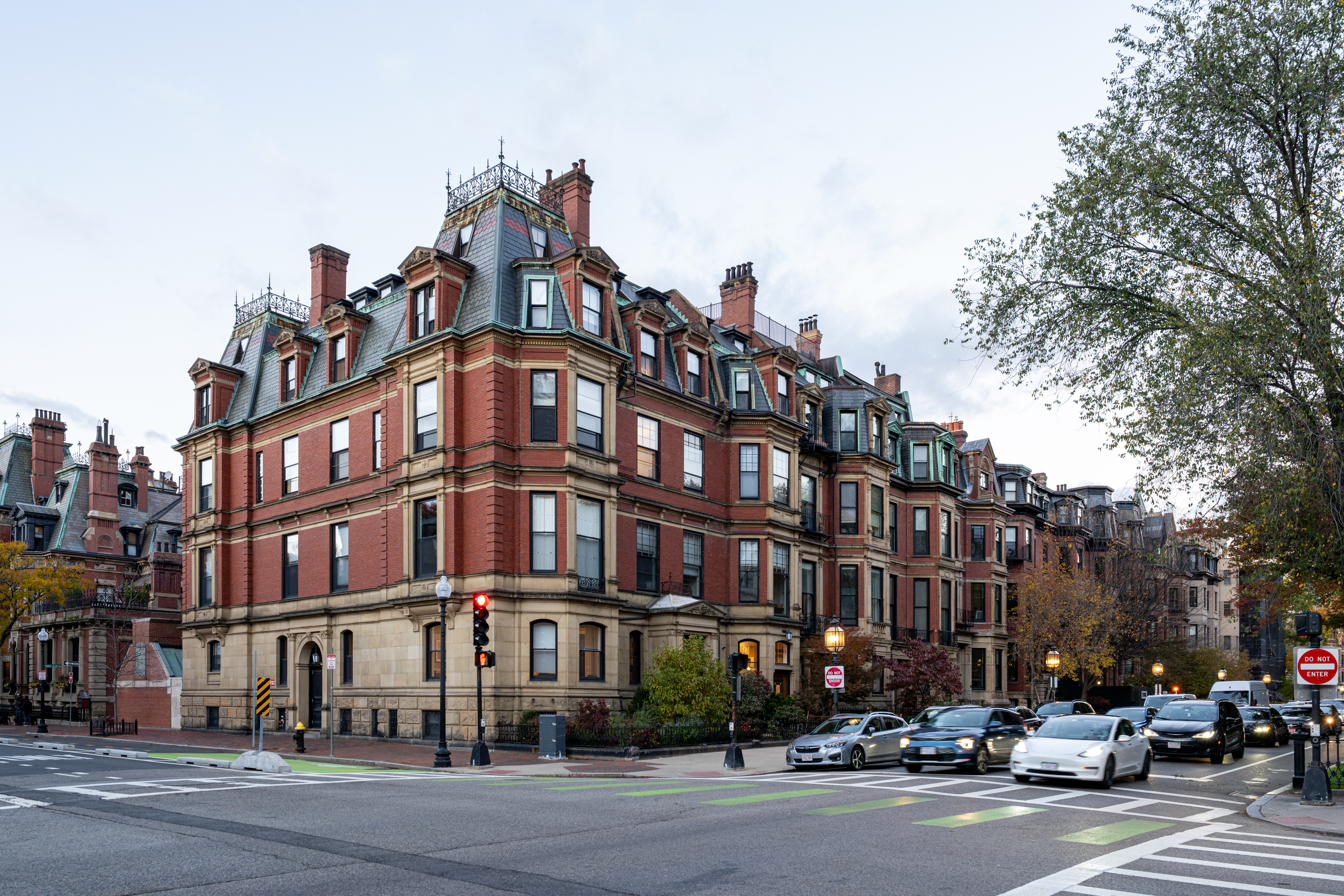
Commonwealth School (2025)

Commonwealth is commonly compared to a liberal arts college or university in its curriculum. It places a strong emphasis on academics, both in the STEM and humanities fields, as well as creative expression and arts. It does not emphasize athletics and sports as much, though doing a sport or other form of physical exercise is required for the fall and winter semesters. Due to the small physical size of the school building, it is unable to host any recreational athletic facilities, instead using the "Cafegymnatorium" in the lower level, next to the kitchen, for all-school gatherings and meetings.

All non-art classes at Commonwealth are either Honors-level or Advanced Placement-level (or an equivalent). Students are required to take the following courses at minimum:

- Four years in an English and Arts class
- Three years in a history class, including a year of AP United States History
- Three years in a foreign language class
- Three years in a mathematics class, including a year of Calculus or Statistics
- Three years in a science class, studying Biology, Chemistry, and then Physics

Ninth-graders are required to take a ninth-grade seminar and a City of Boston class during their foundational first year, eventually receiving all final grades at the end of the year as Pass/Fail. Students typically are placed into appropriate levels for mathematics and language courses and follow linear tracks for art, history, and science courses.

Students can choose to take additional elective courses beginning in their sophomore year, with the available electives varying each year. Electives offered traditionally include courses discussing European History, economics, psychology, neuroscience, Bible history, art history, computer science, materials science, and advanced mathematics. Available language classes include French, Spanish, Latin, and Mandarin, and available arts courses include photography, ceramics, drawing and painting, life drawing, chorus/chorale, jazz band, orchestra, and acting. Students traditionally supplement courses that aren't offered officially through student-run clubs.

=== Student life ===
Commonwealth describes itself as having a diverse student body. 56% of the student body identifies as a person of color, and the school supports a strong LGBTQ+ population. Students come from all across Massachusetts, representing over 40 different cities and towns. Because of the school's location in downtown Boston, it is very accessible by public transit, so for students who do not drive or live in the vicinity, many bike or take the T. With a short walking distance, Commonwealth is directly serviced by light rail through the Green Line at Copley station (between Arlington and Hynes) or by the Commuter Rail and Orange Line at Back Bay station. Commonwealth does not have a traditional official school campus. Instead, students treat nearby Back Bay as its campus and often visit many local attractions during free periods without classes, lunch, or after school. It is next to many restaurants and shops along Newbury Street and Boylston Street, and is a quick walk away from the Public Garden.

The average class contains 12 students, with each grade typically containing upwards of 30 students. Each student is paired with an advisor at the school and meets weekly, and the school offers additional social and emotional support through in-house professional counseling. Students are the primary organizers of clubs and all-school events, and are expected to dedicate considerable time to community service and studying under the advisory of a professional mentor each year. In addition to various affinity groups, some student-run clubs include Chess, Go, Model UN, Debate Team, Dungeons & Dragons, Engineering, Environmental Club, Math Team, and Quiz Bowl. There are no requirements for a student to start their own club.

=== Rankings ===
Niche has ranked Commonwealth as the second-best private high school in the state in 2024, as well as the fifth-best private high school in the entire country. A significant portion of the senior class is recognized each year by the National Merit Scholarship Program. As of 2025, the average SAT composite score was 1470.

== School events ==
=== Assemblies ===
Commonwealth hosts guest speakers at assembly every Thursday.

=== Sports and recreation ===
While the Cafegymnatorium has a singular basketball hoop and its annex has ping-pong tables, it is not large enough for students to exercise or play sports, and instead, the school uses local facilities in downtown Boston, such as the East Boston YMCA or Tennis & Racquet Club for student sports.

Each year students participate in a competitive sport or organized exercise activity in at least two out of three seasons. Competitive sports include soccer, basketball, fencing, cross-country running, and ultimate frisbee. Exercise programs include running, fitness, sailing, squash, dance, ballroom dance, and yoga.

=== School-wide "Hancock" Trip ===
Twice a year—once in September and once in May—all students and faculty take a three-day long trip to "Hancock." Originally held at founder Charles Merrill's estate in its namesake Hancock, New Hampshire, Hancock is now held at a retreat location, currently in lakeside campgrounds located in New Hampshire or Rhode Island.

== Traditions ==
Each day includes "Recess," when all students and faculty gather in the school's multi-purpose "Cafegymnatorium" for a snack and to hear announcements.

Another tradition is "passing the clay," where all students take part in passing boxes of clay from the first to the fifth floor. This event happens twice a year.

== Publications ==
There are several student-run publications at Commonwealth. They include:

- Yearbook: Each year, the senior class (and a few juniors in training) produces its own yearbook.
- Helicon: The literary magazine club, with the school's funding, publishes a literary magazine, which accepts many types of literature and art, including poems, short stories, photographs, drawings, and paintings.
- The Commonwealth Chronicle: The school's newspaper, which includes a satirical publication called The Leek.

The school produces CM, a twice-yearly magazine for alumni/ae and parents.

== Notable alumni ==
- David Altshuler, geneticist and co-founder of MIT's Broad Institute
- Patrick Amory, Matador Records general manager
- Mikaela Beardsley, film producer
- Emily Botein, public radio producer
- Loren Bouchard, animator and television director (dropped out before graduating)
- Jonatha Brooke, singer/songwriter
- Will Brownsberger, Massachusetts State Senator
- Evan Dando and Ben Deily of the Lemonheads
- Mark Denbeaux, attorney and civil rights activist
- John Davis of The Folk Implosion
- Liza Featherstone, journalist
- Peter W. Galbraith, diplomat
- Kaitlyn Greenidge, author of We Love You Charlie Freeman and New York Times contributing opinion writer
- Mark Greif, co-founder, co-editor and contributor to n+1
- Karen Guillemin, microbiologist
- Susanna Kaysen, author of Girl, Interrupted, among other works, and has included references to Commonwealth in her books
- Anthony Kuhn, NPR correspondent
- Kasi Lemmons, director
- Hamish Linklater, actor
- Mia Matsumiya, violinist of experimental rock group Kayo Dot
- Sophia Michahelles, pageant puppet designer and co-artistic director, Processional Arts Workshop
- Ottessa Moshfegh, author of New York Times bestseller My Year of Rest and Relaxation
- Jesse Peretz, film director and former Lemonheads bassist
- Nina Pillard, judge, U.S. Court of Appeals for the District of Columbia Circuit
- Daniel Pipes, historian, foreign policy analyst, Middle East & Islam specialist
- Jonathan Rotenberg, founder of the Boston Computer Society, while still a student at Commonwealth
- Cameron Russell, model
- Jackson Elliot, Athletics Director at the Commonwealth School

== Trademark dispute ==
In June 2016, the Boston Globe reported that Commonwealth School sued Commonwealth Academy, a high school in Springfield, Massachusetts, over the use of the name "Commonwealth". It had trademarked "Commonwealth School" in 2012. The Springfield school is now known as Springfield Commonwealth Academy.
