= Jonathan Rotenberg =

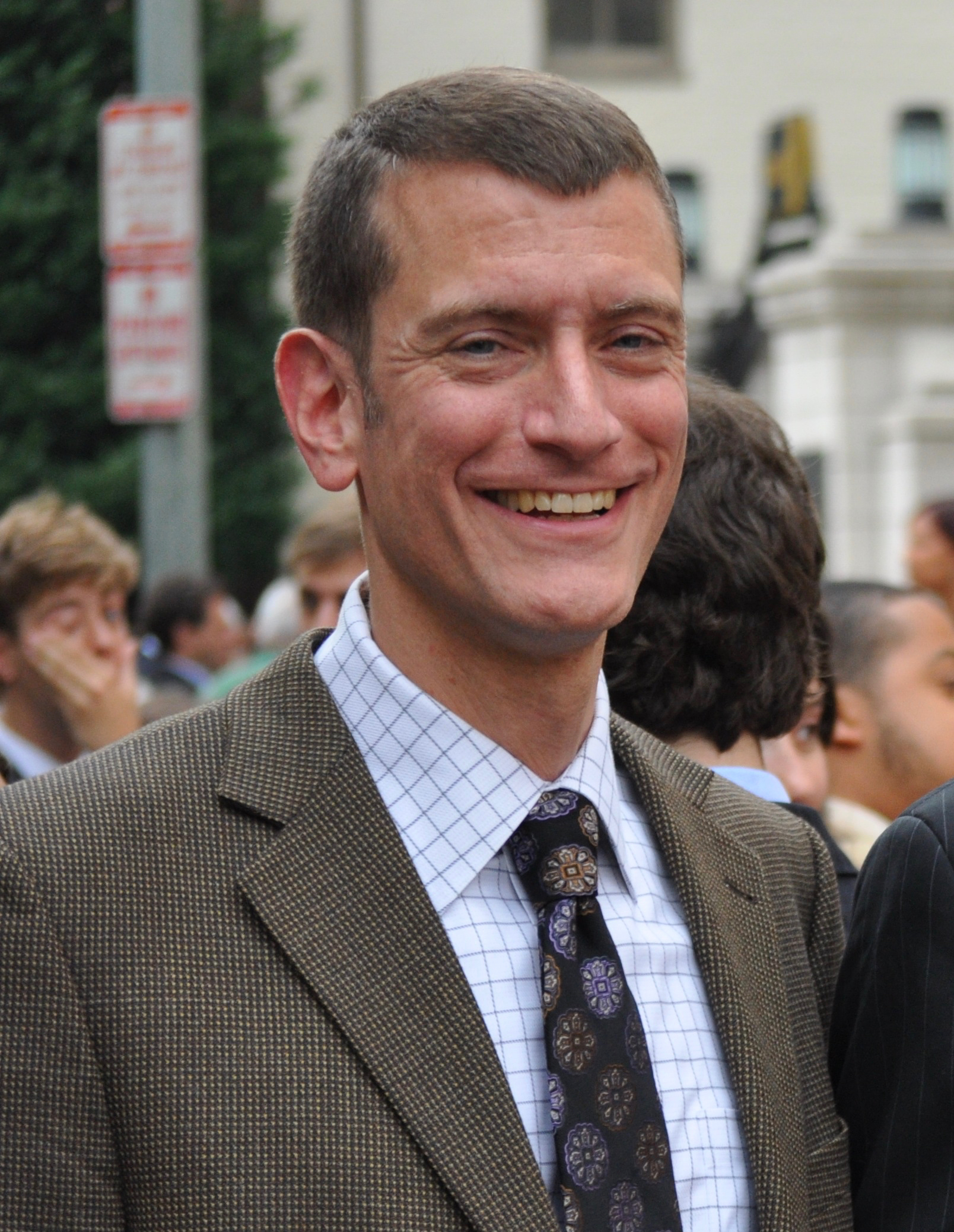
- Born: 29 April 1963 (age 63); Boston, Massachusetts, US
- Education: Brown University, Harvard Business School
- Occupations: Executive coach, Management consultant
- Known for: Co-founder of The Boston Computer Society
- Relatives: Marc Rotenberg (brother)

Jonathan Rotenberg (born April 29, 1963) is an executive coach, management consultant, and author. In 1977, he cofounded The Boston Computer Society, which became the world's largest personal computer user organization. He is currently writing a book about what he learned from his early mentor, Apple founder Steve Jobs.

== Early life ==
Jonathan was born in Boston, MA. He is a graduate of Commonwealth School, an independent high school in Boston's Back Bay. As a 13-year-old freshman, he cofounded The Boston Computer Society in the school's library.

== Education ==
Rotenberg has an A.B. in Economics from Brown University; an MBA from Harvard Business School; and a Graduate Certificate in Executive Coaching from the Massachusetts School of Professional Psychology.

== Career ==
=== The Boston Computer Society ===
Rotenberg cofounded an organization to demystify personal computers called The Boston Computer Society, popularly known as the BCS. He was its president from 1977 to 1990. During that period, the Society became the leading international forum where personal computer companies unveiled groundbreaking new products and technologies to the public. For example, in 1979 Dan Bricklin and Bob Frankston introduced the first spreadsheet program, VisiCalc.

In 1984, Steve Jobs and Steve Wozniak made the first public presentation of the Macintosh at the BCS. Mitch Kapor introduced Lotus 1-2-3. Dozens of industry leaders — from Bill Gates to Michael Dell, Nolan Bushnell to Esther Dyson, Ray Kurzweil to Sherry Turkle, Seymour Papert to Dan Bricklin — came each month to connect with BCS members. The Society developed more than a hundred user and special-interest subgroups, many of which became the largest of their kind in the world. It published over 20 publications and sponsored nearly a hundred educational programs each month.

Before his twenty-first birthday, Rotenberg had been profiled in The Wall Street Journal (front page), PEOPLE, InfoWorld, The New York Times, BusinessWeek, The Boston Globe and TIME magazine, and on CBS Evening News. In 1990, Jonathan moved from president of the BCS to become its chairman.

=== Management Consulting ===
Jonathan began his career in management consulting at a Cambridge, Massachusetts consulting firm, Monitor Group, which was founded in 1983 by six entrepreneurs with Harvard Business School ties.[3] He was with Monitor from 1991 to 1999. Jonathan became a strategy consultant with internet consulting firm Viant Inc. in 1999. He later joined Fair Isaac Corp. and was co-leader of its management consulting organization.

Jonathan's work as a management consultant focuses on customer-centric enterprise transformation: Helping large companies redesign sales, marketing, e-channels, customer care, and operations around the needs and desires of target customers. He has advised and guided senior leadership teams of several Fortune 500 companies on multi-year, enterprise-wide transformation initiatives.

=== Executive Coaching ===
Since 2012, Jonathan has been an executive coach. He works with senior executives on leadership development and developing high-performance organizations.

=== Writing ===
Jonathan is writing a book called My Teacher Steve Jobs. The book is about his friendship from 1981 – 2011 with Apple founder Steve Jobs, and what Jobs taught him about idealism, spirituality and leadership. A first chapter of the book was published by High Tech History.

== Awards ==
Rotenberg was named one of the “Top 100 Young Entrepreneurs in America” by the Association of Collegiate Entrepreneurs. Computer Reseller News named him “One of the 25 Most Influential Executives in the Personal Computer Industry.” And Slashdot named him one of the “Top 150 i-Technology Heroes of All Time.”
