= Neuroleadership =

Neuroleadership refers to the application of findings from neuroscience to the field of leadership. The first time the concept of neuroleadership was mentioned was in 2005 in a Harvard University publication entitled Harvard Business Review. One year later, the theories and principles of this new tool were collated by David Rock and Jeffrey Swartz in their article, The Neuroscience of Leadership. in the US publication Strategy+Business.

Neuroleadership is not without its critics. They question whether having scientific brain data to back up what was commonly believed adds any value.

== SCARF model ==
The SCARF model is a psychological framework developed by David Rock. It is based on the synthesis of numerous research studies and serves as a mnemonic for remembering the key social domains that drive human behavior in social interactions: Status, Certainty, Autonomy, Relatedness and Fairness.
