= Women 2.0 =

Women's technology company

Women 2.0 is a global network and social platform for aspiring and current female founders of technology ventures. It was founded in April 2006 and primarily provides an incubator for ideas program for engineers, designers, business, and marketing participants who want to launch and develop their own high-technology ventures.

== Background ==
Founded by Shaherose Charania, Angie Chang, and Shivani Sopory, the group organizes workshops and events aimed at helping female entrepreneurs. It aims to increase the number of female entrepreneurs starting high-growth ventures through access to resources, network, and knowledge. Around 80 percent of the network's members are women who are involved in startups. The organization received a round of funding from the Ewing Marion Kauffman Foundation in October 2011.

== Initiatives ==
Women 2.0 offers a five-week program that involve twenty participants. Members of the team work together to produce five viable products and develop a problem hypothesis. After it is validated and a basic prototype has been created, the team applies to incubators such as Astia, TechStars, Springboard, and YCombinator, among others. There is also an annual business plan competition that culminates in a Pitch Night, where finalists present their plan before a panel of judges.

In 2011, Women 2.0's mobile-focused Founder Labs became an independent organization based in San Francisco and New York City.

in 2015 they started giving out awards.
