= Dave Lavery =

American scientist and roboticist (born 1959)

David B. Lavery
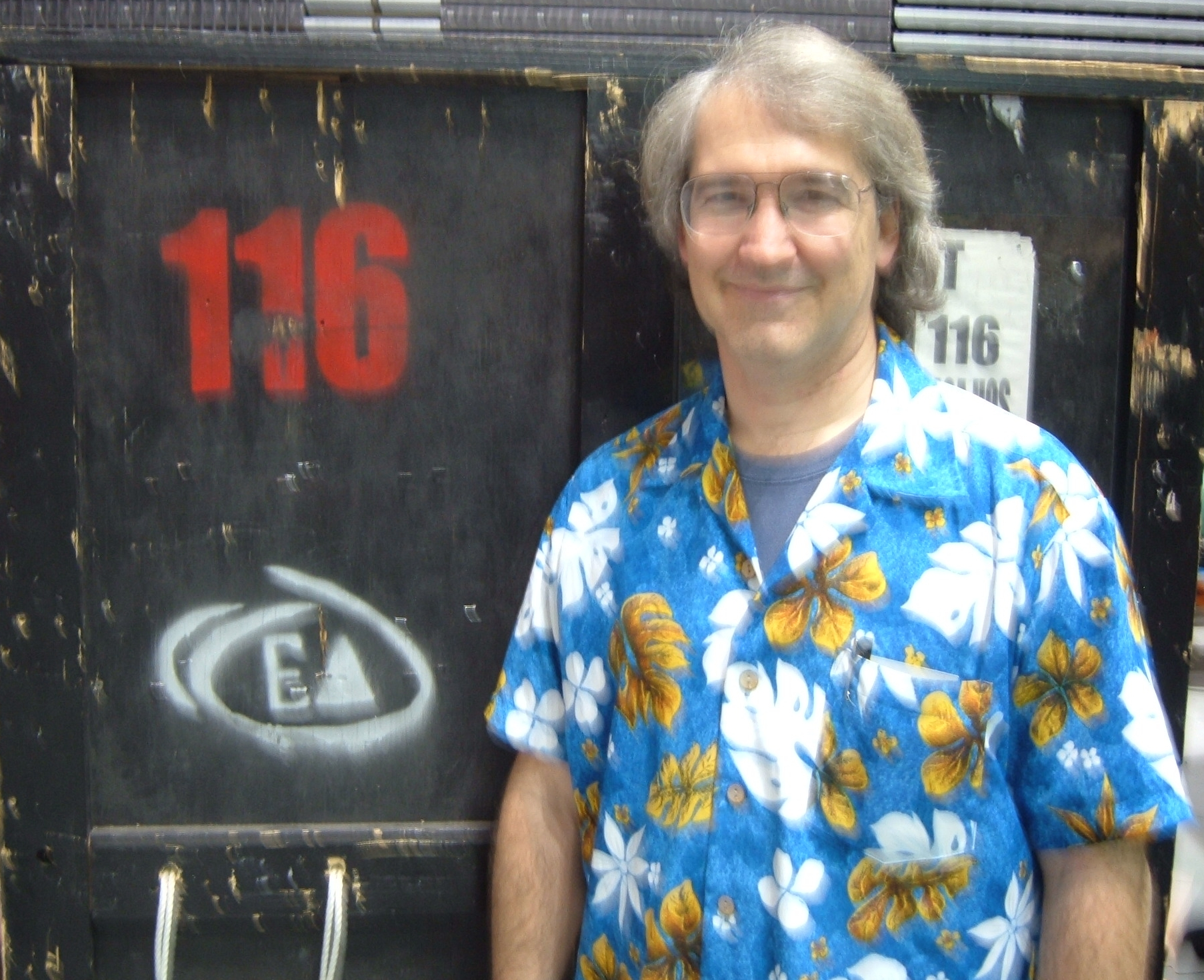
- Born: May 28, 1959 (age 67)
- Education: Virginia Tech
- Known for: Mars Exploration Rovers
- Scientific career
- Fields: Robotics, Space exploration
- Workplaces: National Aeronautics and Space Administration

Dave Lavery (born May 28, 1959) is an American scientist and roboticist who is the program executive for Solar System Exploration at NASA Headquarters. He also is a member of the FIRST executive advisory board, and is well known among participants of the FIRST Robotics Competition as a mentor of Team 116.

== Early life and education ==
From an early age, Lavery was obsessed with space exploration. With his eyesight being too poor to become an astronaut, he set about to use machines as his proxy for exploring the Solar System. He attended Virginia Tech, where he obtained a bachelor's degree in Computer Science.

== Career ==
Lavery led NASA's Telerobotics Technology Development Program, responsible for the direction and oversight of robotics and planetary exploration within the organization. He and the program was responsible for the likes of the Mars Sojourner rover, which was the first rover he worked on, and the National Robotics Engineering Consortium.

Lavery currently works at the NASA Headquarters in Washington, D.C., as the program executive for solar system explorations. He oversees and is heavily involved with the Mars Exploration Rovers. Notably, he oversaw the mission of the Curiosity rover in 2012.

Lavery is also the project manager for NASAs' Robotics Alliance Project, a position he shared with fellow NASA scientist and FIRST Robotics participant Mark Leon.

== FIRST Robotics ==
Lavery is very active within the FIRST Robotics Competition, and currently sits on the Executive Advisory Board of FIRST. He is responsible for NASA's vast involvement in the competitions, having brought the organization to the attention of NASA in 1995. NASA now sponsors over 300 teams, and hosts teams at each of its research centers in the United States. He is a mentor for FRC Team 116 (Epsilon Delta (εΔ) "From small changes come big differences", from Herndon High School in Herndon. He was also a member of the FRC Game Design Committee until January 2011.

Lavery is also known for his work in creating the original game animations for the FIRST Robotics Competition. The Competition's Dave Lavery Animation Award for Excellence in Animation is named in honor of him.
