= Berkeley Macintosh Users Group =

Largest Macintosh users' group, active 1984-2000

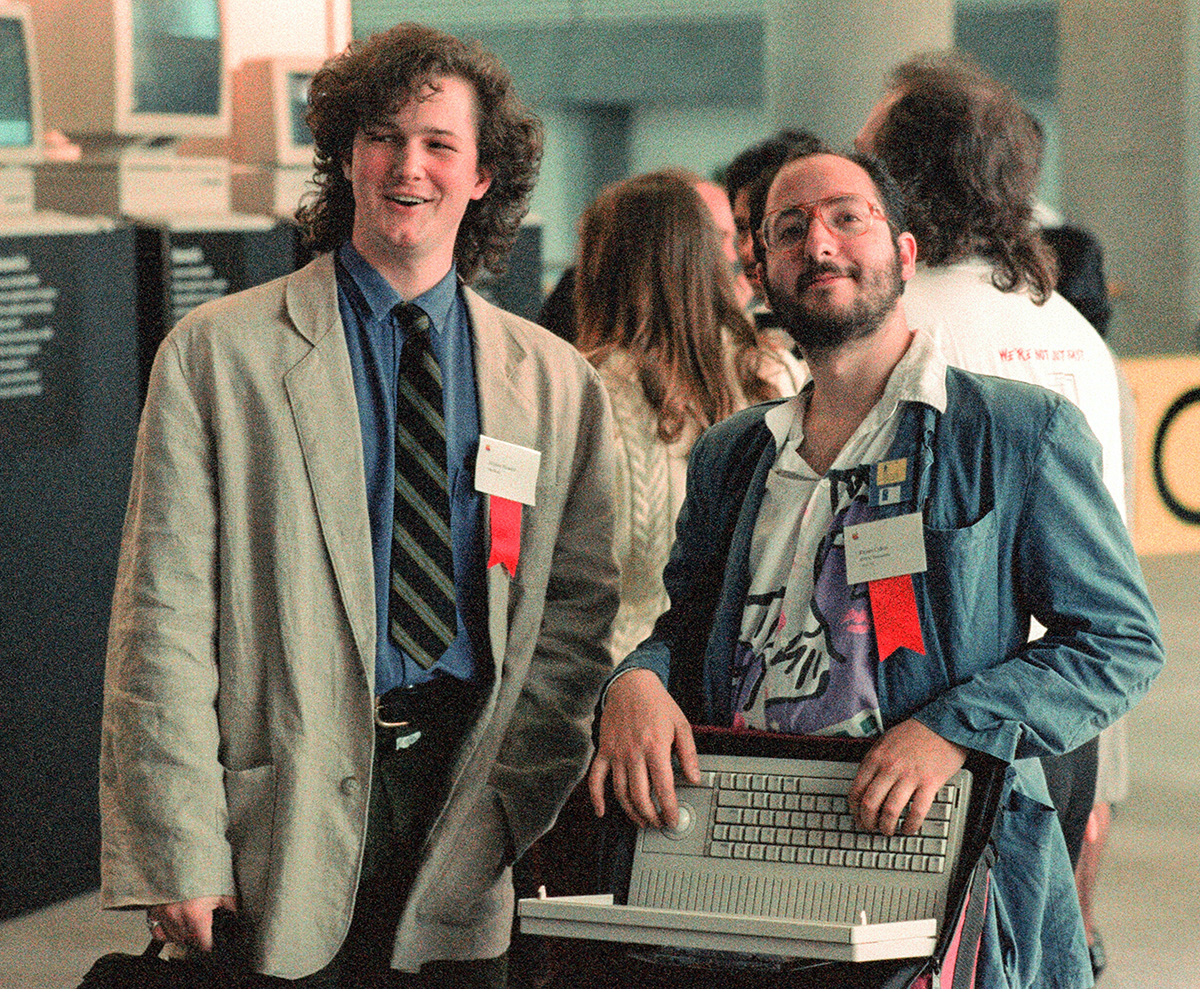
Original BMUG members Stephen Howard and Raines Cohen on the show floor of MacWorld Expo San Francisco, in January 1990. Raines holds a Macintosh Portable prototype loaned to BMUG by Mary Nicely (of Apple's Higher Ed group) to assist with Loma Prieta earthquake disaster recovery.

The Berkeley Macintosh Users Group (BMUG) was the largest Macintosh User Group. It was founded in September 1984 by a group of UC Berkeley students including Reese Jones and Raines Cohen as a focal-point for the nascent Apple Macintosh user community. With more than 13,000 members, or "BMUGgers" at its peak in 1993, the group was the largest, and generally understood to be the most important, Macintosh users group. A few of the notable members include John "Captain Crunch" Draper, the Sultan of Brunei Hassanal Bolkiah, notorious murderer Enrique Zambrano, early hacker-chaser Cliff Stoll, Inktomi founder Eric Brewer, and many prominent computing journalists like John Dvorak, Ilene Hoffman, Leo Laporte and Adam Engst. An example of the group's omnipresent blue-floppy-disk lapel pin is held in the Smithsonian Institution's American History collection. BMUG's history and activities were closely linked with the MacWorld Expo meetings, traditionally held in San Francisco each January and Boston each August.

== Organization ==
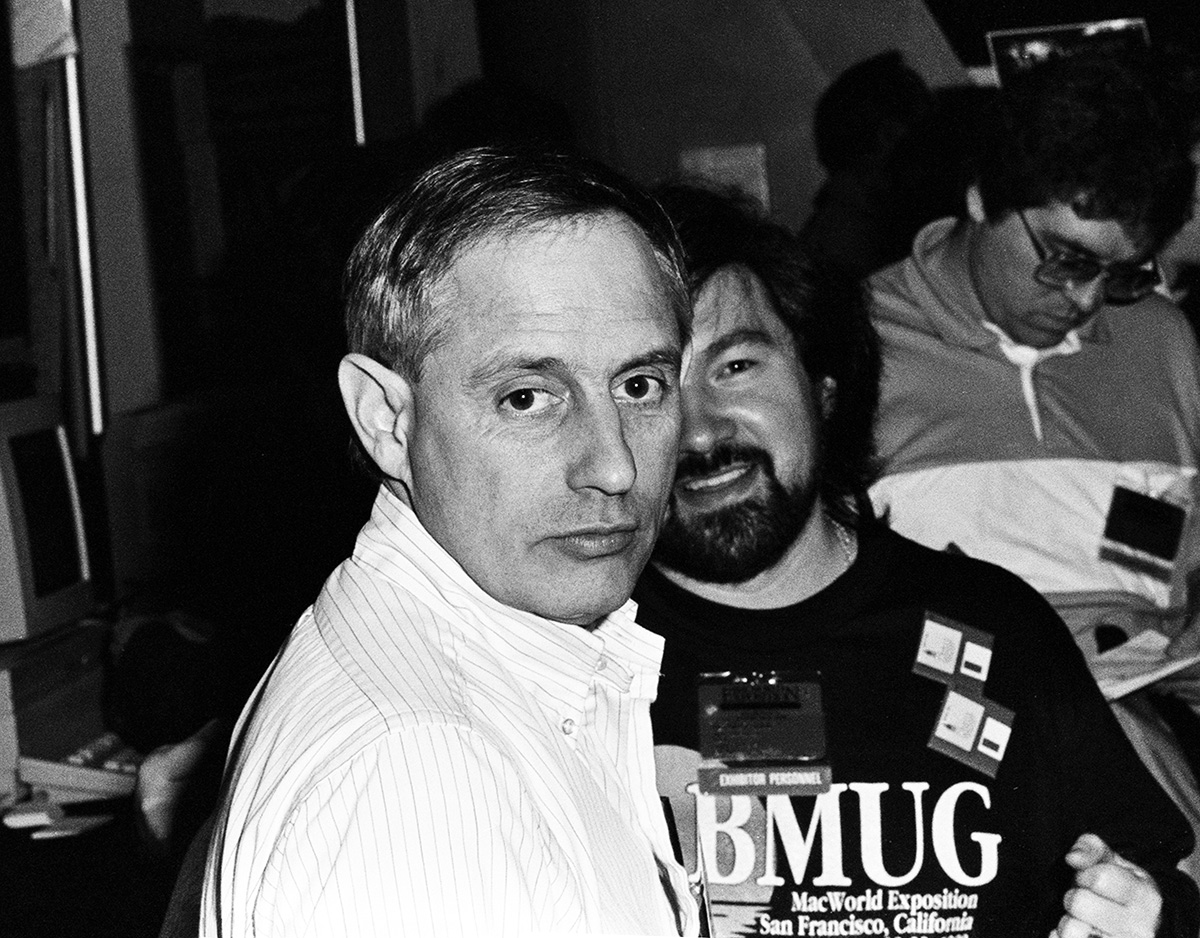
BMUG business manager Harry Critchfield and volunteer Herb Dang, staffing the BMUG booth at MacWorld Expo

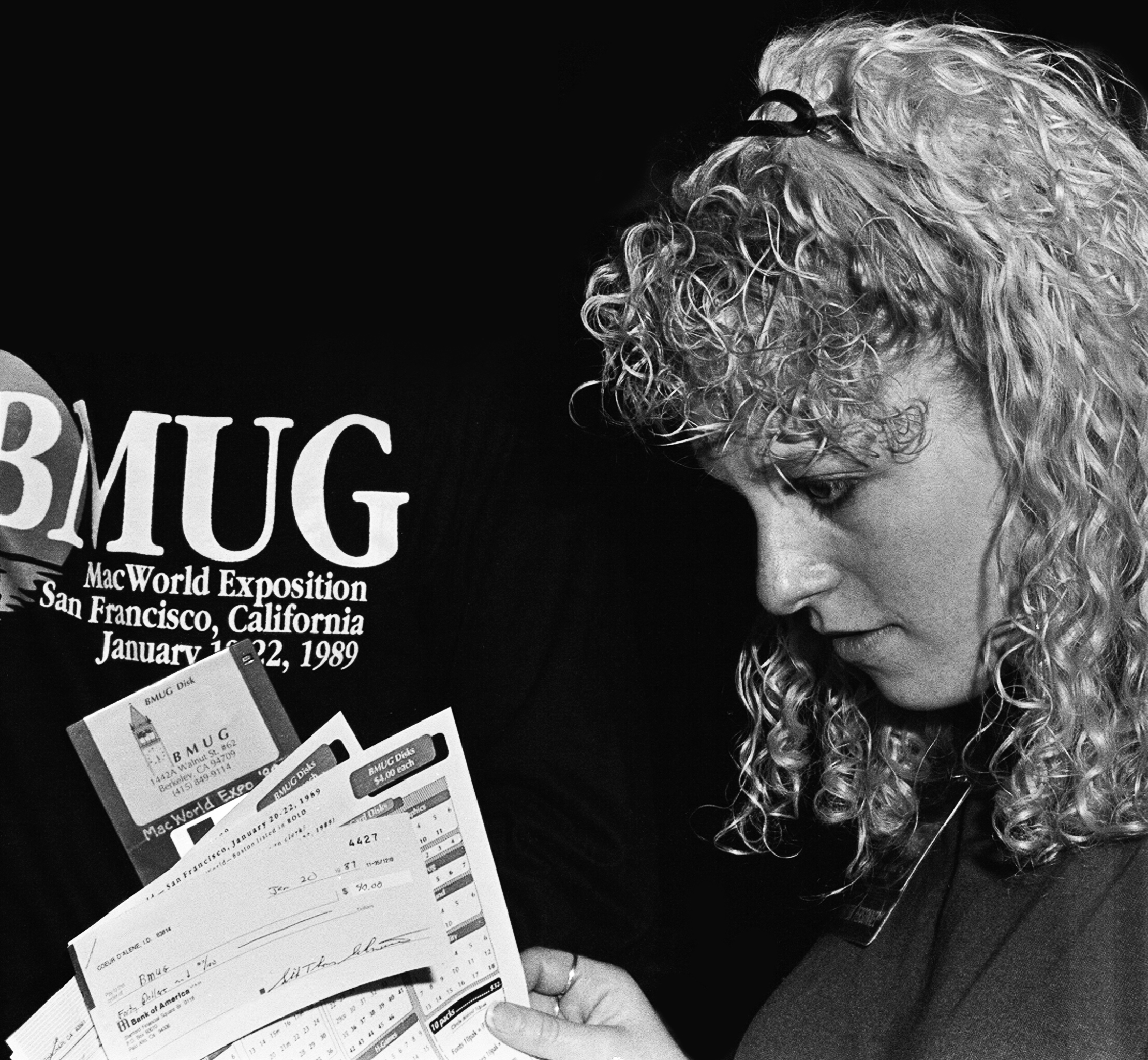
BMUG staffer Alisa Shulman surveys disk order forms in the BMUG booth at MacWorld Expo

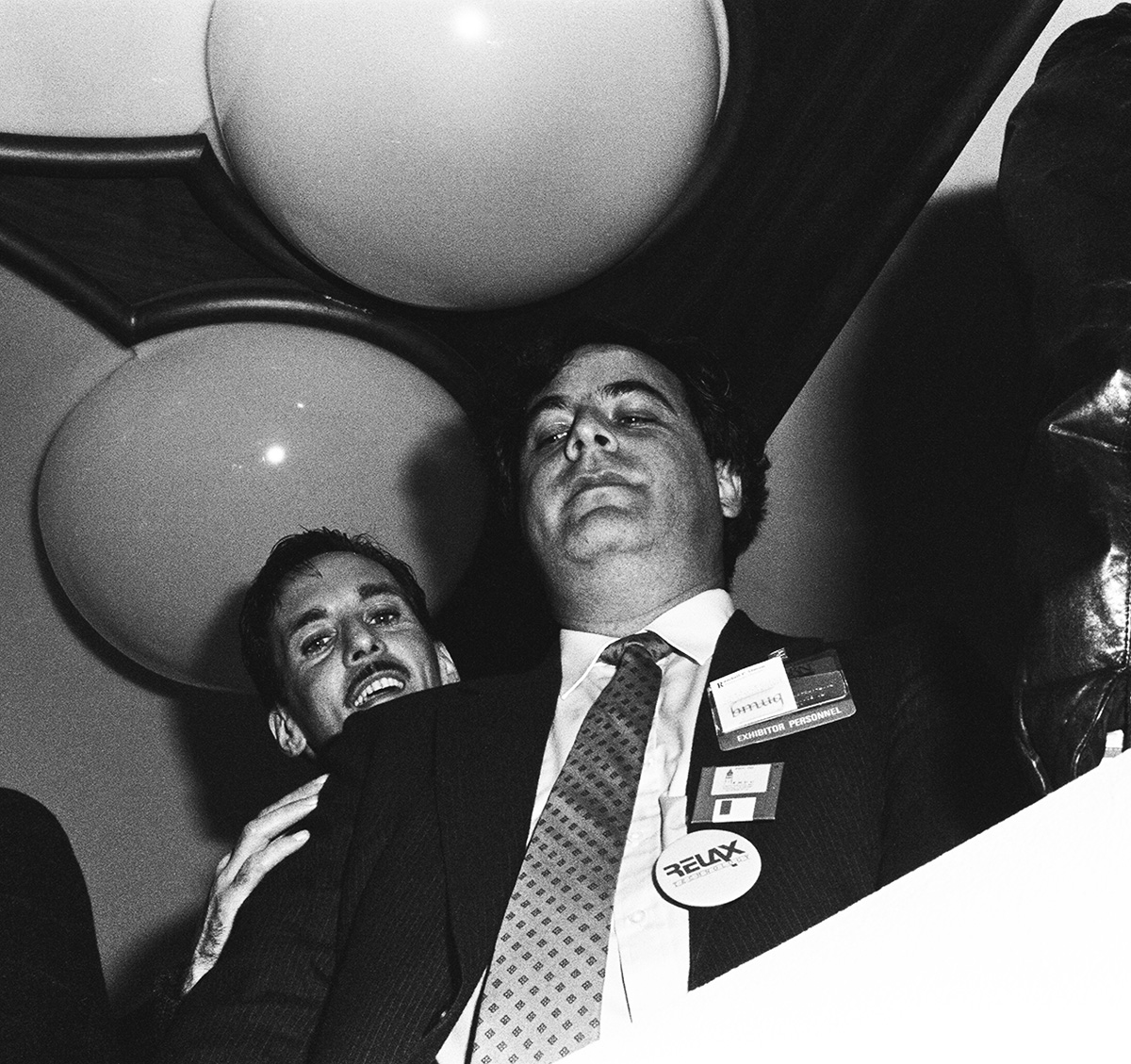
BMUG support manager Randy Simon, at a BMUG party in the Frank Lloyd Wright Circle Gallery building

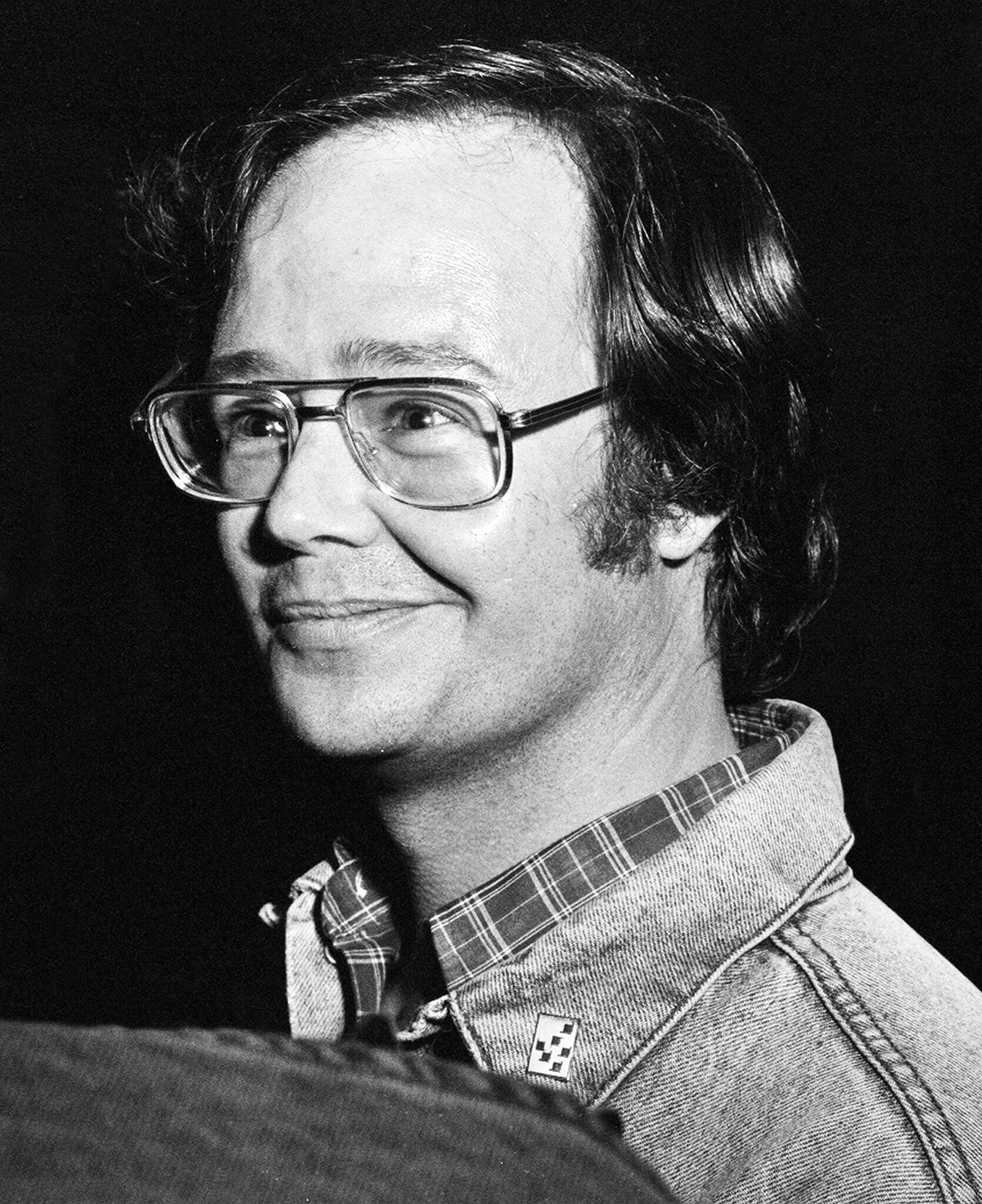
Electrical engineer and BMUG volunteer Chuck Meyer, shown here wearing a Farallon pin on his collar

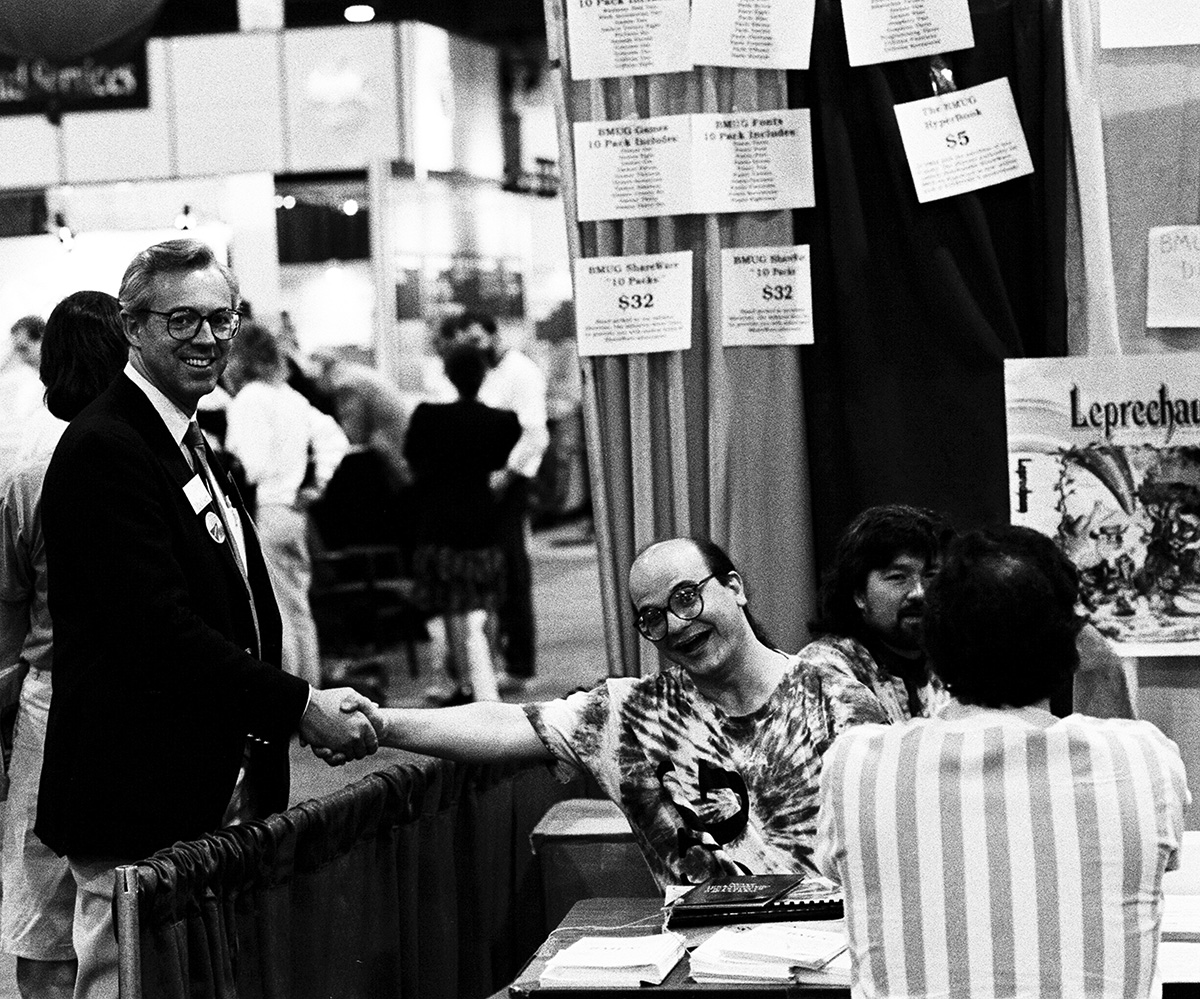
BMUG technical manager Steve Costa shakes hands with BMUG member and MacUser editor Gil Davis (Herb Dang in the background)

All photographs taken at the MacWorld Expo San Francisco in January 1989

Day-to-day management of the organization was balanced between the senior full-time staff: business manager Harry Critchfield, technical manager Steve Costa, and support manager Randy Simon.

=== Business ===
BMUG's finances and business operations were managed by Harry Critchfield and Alisa Schulman, better known for her role as a DJ at KALX. In 1995 Anne Wrixon replaced Harry Critchfield, and in 1997, Wrixon was replaced by Hal Gibson, who remained until the end.

=== Technical ===
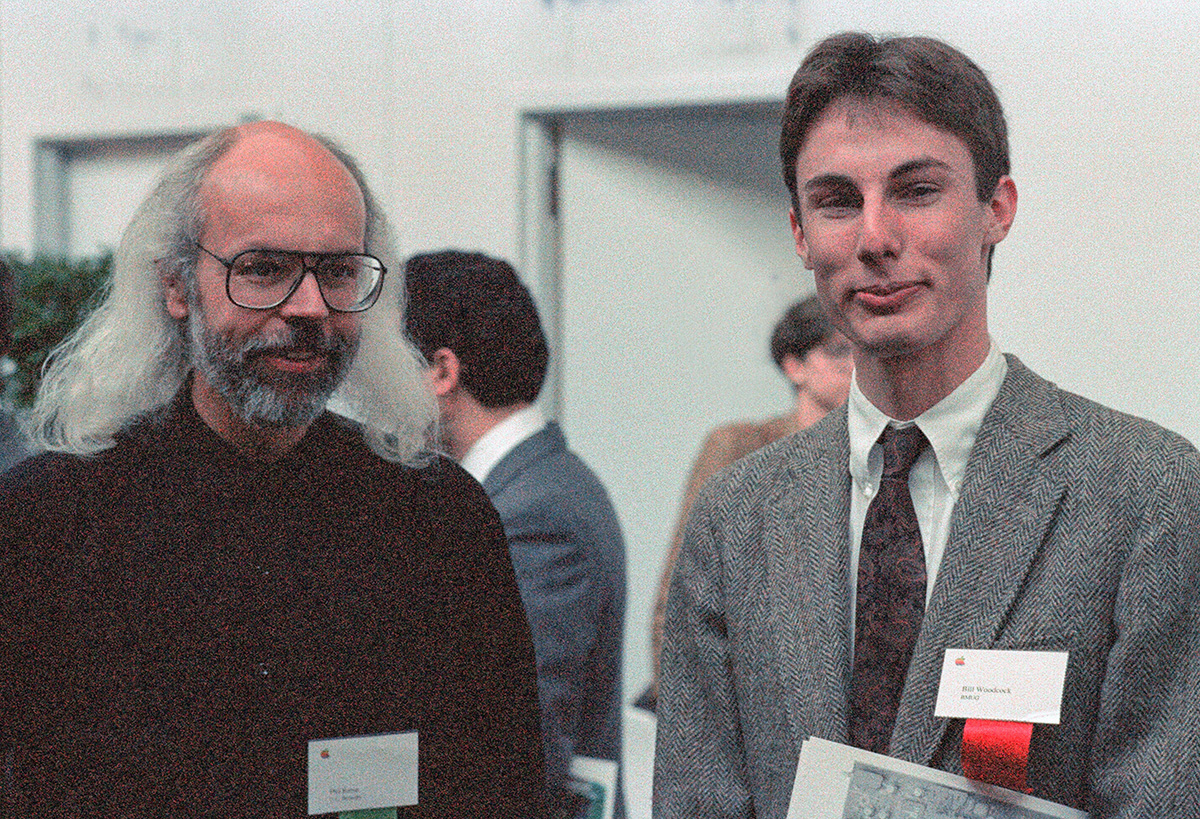
BMUG volunteers Phil Reese and Bill Woodcock at MacWorld Expo San Francisco, January 1990

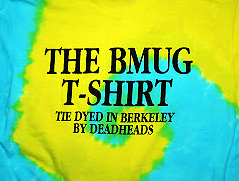
The BMUG T-shirt, created by Woodcock, became a staple of Berkeley Macintosh Users Group booth sales through the 1980s.

One of BMUG's principal operations was collaborative Macintosh repair and maintenance. A benefit of BMUG membership was hardware repair (and often recovery of lost documents from floppy and hard disks). The technical operations were managed by Steve Costa. Electrical engineer Chuck Meyer conducted many of the trickier repairs. Herb Dang was a fixture in BMUG's technical services, and his son Frank continued that tradition into a second generation.

=== Support ===
BMUG maintained a Macintosh support call-center, which helped users around the world by answering questions and helping them resolve technical problems with their computers. The support operation was managed by Randy Simon, and staffed by volunteers. While much of the support operation dealt with assisting users whose computers had crashed, a significant portion of it dealt with the specific "vertical market" of desktop publishing and prepress issues, which was then in its infancy and was one of the Macintosh's primary markets. Randy Simon also coordinated the production and publications of BMUG's massive biannual newsletters, sometimes totaling more than a thousand pages per year, initially with the assistance of BMUG volunteers Carolyn Sagami, Zig Zichterman, Robert Lettieri and Bill Woodcock, and later Hans Hansen. A collaboration between BMUG members, Programming SIG chair Greg Dow (now at Adobe) and networking and prepress expert Bill Woodcock (now at Packet Clearing House) resulted in the first example of "database publishing," a 1989 encyclopedia of Macintosh software, for which plates were produced directly from a FileMaker database without intervening processing.

=== Offices ===
BMUG was initially located in suite 3B, 2150 Kittredge Street, in downtown Berkeley, directly adjoining the southwest corner of the UC Berkeley campus. This building also housed Farallon Computing until Farallon outgrew the space and moved five blocks south-east to Dwight Way. After six years, BMUG moved to a larger space with street frontage at 2055 Center Street, a block and a half west of campus and directly across from the downtown Berkeley BART station.

== Projects ==
=== Shareware disk duplication ===
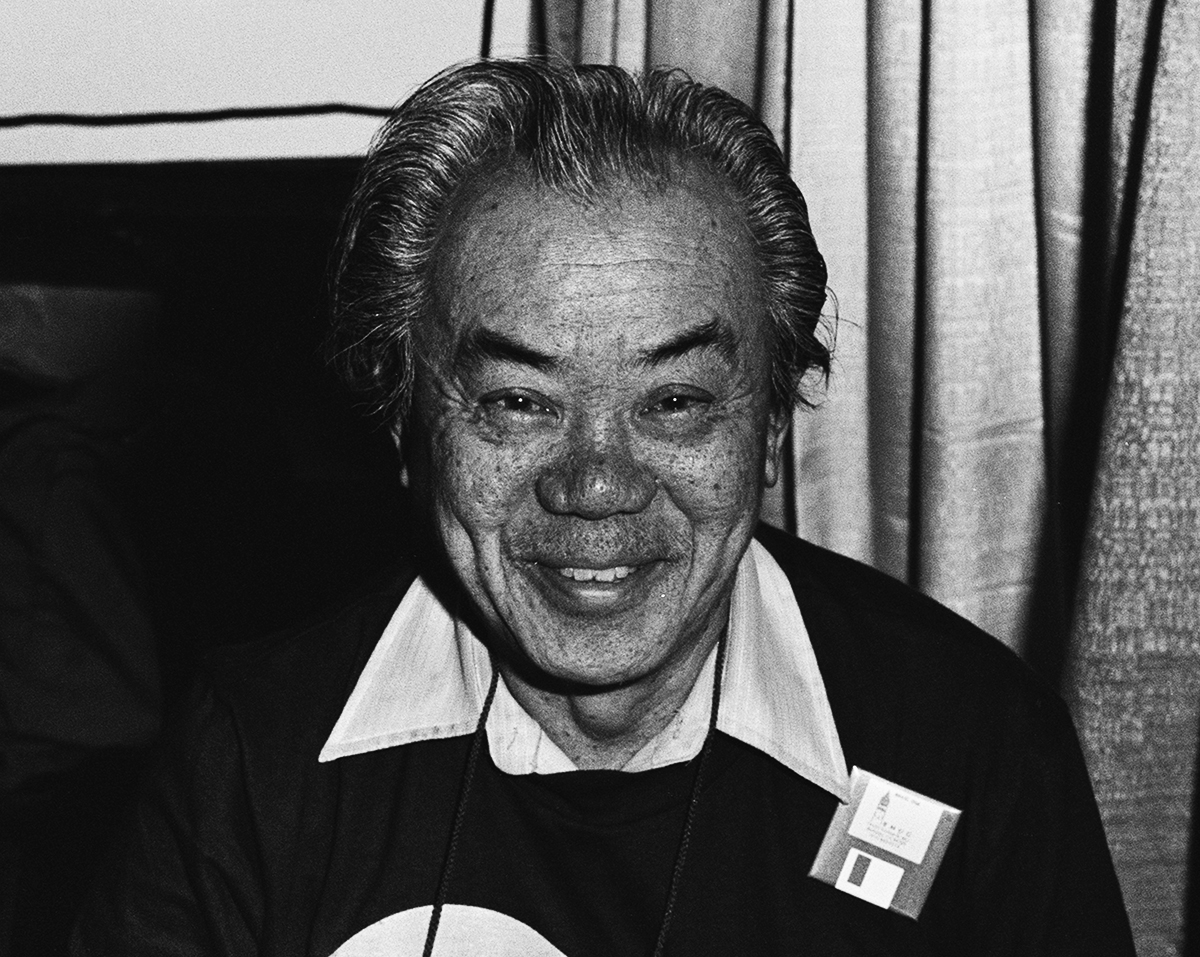
BMUG volunteer Art Lau working the BMUG booth at MacWorld Expo San Francisco, January 1989

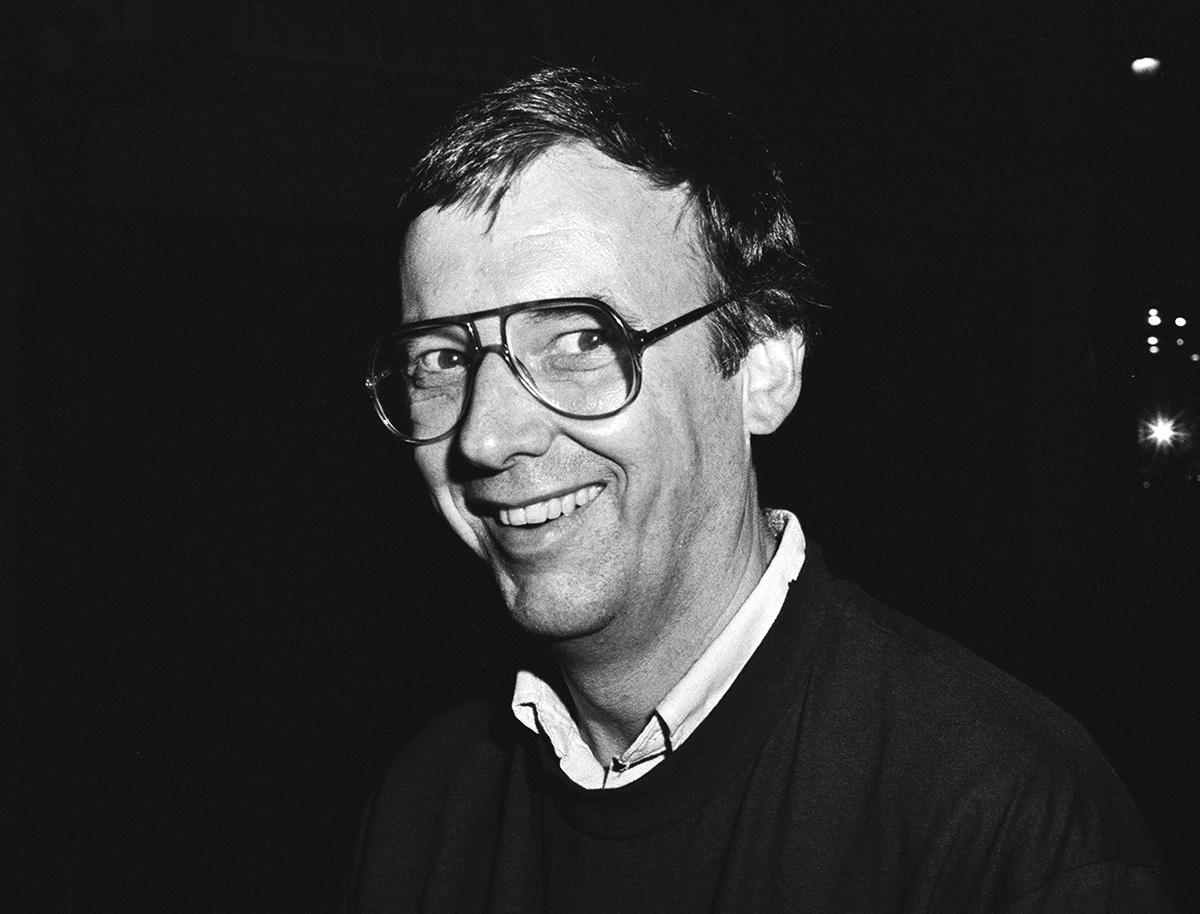
BMUG volunteer Gerald Raddatz at MacWorld Expo San Francisco, January 1989

BMUG's primary revenue-generating activity was the sneakernet distribution of Macintosh shareware software from its comprehensive library on 400k and 800k 3.5" floppy disks. BMUG's shareware disk duplication and distribution program was run by Art Lau and Gerald Raddatz, supplemented by the efforts of many of the other volunteers.

=== BMUGnet/PhoneNET ===
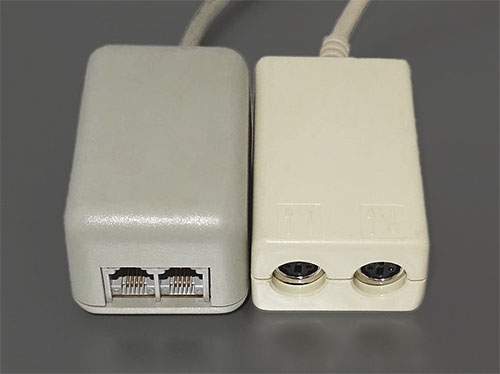
Farallon PhoneNET and Apple LocalTalk transceivers. Both connected computing devices (like Macintoshes and LaserWriter printers) with Apple Desktop Bus ports to LocalTalk local area networks. The Farallon transceiver did so over ANSI/TIA-568 standard structured cabling plants, while the Apple transceiver used a short-range proprietary daisy chain.

One of the early successes for the group was BMUGNet, a variant of Apple's LocalTalk system which used standard telephone wires to connect Macintosh computers together in a local area network. Wiring plans were initially published in the Fall 1985 BMUG Newsletter, but members could purchase adapters assembled by the group. Co-founder Reese Jones branched the production off as the commercial business Farallon Computing in 1986, renaming the product PhoneNet. The group invented other subsequent low-cost hardware kits as well... the 1991 introduction of the low-cost Mac LC prompted BMUG to begin offering a $12 VGA monitor adapter. MacRecorder, the first audio input device for the Macintosh, was also first released in 1985 as a BMUG kit, before being productized by Farallon and then Macromedia.

=== Weekly meetings ===
BMUG was famous for meetings, "We are in the business of giving away information" motto, "BMUG Awards", its MacWorld Expo get-togethers, CD, and book publishing, 400+ page biannual "newsletters" akin to the Whole Earth Catalog, and the shareware collections for Macintosh Public domain software sold to members and customers on floppy disks. These meetings are cited by some tech notables as their introduction to technology.

BMUG hosted a weekly Thursday night meeting with questions and answers, and software demonstrations by vendors, followed at the end by a raffle. Speakers included Steve Jobs, Guy Kawasaki, Ted Nelson, Heidi Roizen, Andy Hertzfeld, Bill Atkinson, Jean-Louis Gassée, Marc Benioff, Melinda Ann French (Gates), and Bill Gates.

=== Special interest groups ===
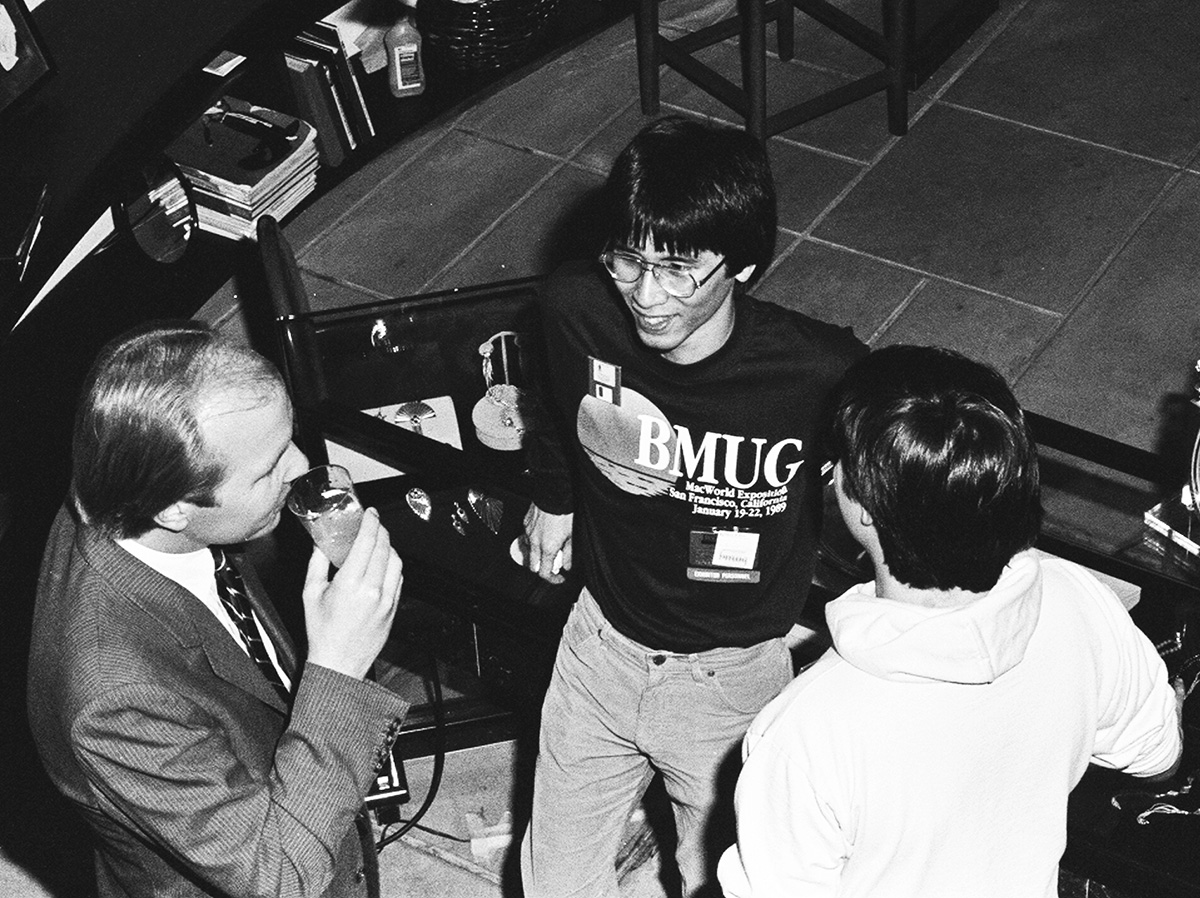
BMUG Programmers Special Interest Group chair Greg Dow, at a BMUG party in the Frank Lloyd Wright Circle Gallery building, San Francisco, January 1989

It also held special interest groups (SIGs) on Basic Mac, Troubleshooting, ClarisWorks (integrated word processing, drawing, painting, spreadsheet, database and telecommunications), FileMakerPro relational databases, graphics, video, music, the Internet, programming and mathematics. Branch groups held general meetings in outlying areas, including San Francisco, Cupertino and Tokyo.

=== Biannual newsletter ===
Rather than publish a standard monthly newsletter, the group decided to publish a collection of articles in a bound book every six months. The resulting "newsletter" routinely exceeded 300 pages in length. The newsletter was originally edited by volunteers Carolyn Sagami and Zig Zichterman, until Randy Simon was hired as staff, and then turned over to Hans Hansen when Randy departed.

=== Bulletin board system ===
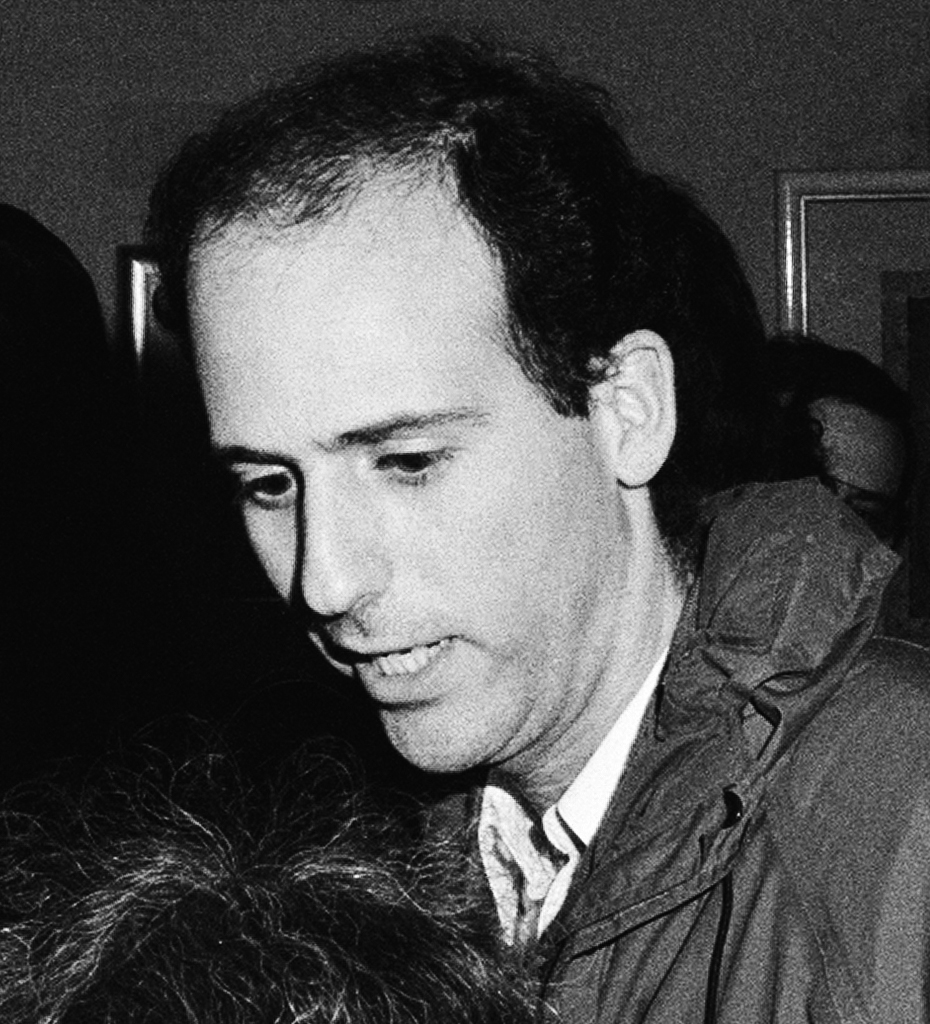
BMUG BBS administrator Bernard Aboba, at a BMUG party in the Frank Lloyd Wright Circle Gallery building, San Francisco, January 1989

BMUG's Bulletin board system or "BBS" was managed by Bernard Aboba (then in graduate school at Stanford and UC Berkeley, subsequently at Microsoft) with the assistance of Bill Woodcock. It was an early FidoNet node, and from 1986 through 1993, the home of the FidoNet MacNetAdmin "echo," which spawned the AppleTalk Network Managers Association (which in turn begat the AppleTalk Networking Forum), the inaptly-named A/UX Users Group, and numerous other real-world periodic meet-ups. The BMUG BBS also served as a nexus for the interoperability testing of email gateways between FidoNet, UUCP, SMTP, and a number of proprietary AppleTalk, NetWare, and Internet Protocol electronic mail systems, including CE Software's QuickMail, SoftArc's FirstClass, those from Information Electronics and AppleLink Personal Edition, which went on to become America Online. When the BBS host system in Berkeley was damaged by the 1989 Loma Prieta earthquake, Aboba set up a temporary stand-in using a solid-state industrial PLC and multi-line serial controller, which was able to keep up with the heavy call volume by answering, presenting an ASCII banner explaining the situation, and immediately disconnecting. The BBS eventually ran on hardware in Berkeley, Palo Alto, Boston, and Tokyo.

== Books ==
In addition to the newsletter, BMUG published the occasional reference book. These included:

- The BMUG Guide to Bulletin Boards and Beyond, by Bernard Aboba, 1992 - A guide to setup and management of dial-up BBSs.
- Zen and the Art of Resource Editing, by Derrick Schneider, 1990-1995 - A guide to using Apple's ResEdit tool to modify Macintosh software.
- The Tao of AppleScript, by Derrick Schneider, 1993 and 1994 - A guide to scripting and automation under MacOS System 7.

== Controversy ==
=== Rivalry with the Boston Computer Society ===
BMUG was certainly the largest Macintosh users group, but the Boston Computer Society was the largest computer users group. BCS-Mac, the Macintosh special interest group of the Boston Computer Society, was the second largest Macintosh users group. A good-humored rivalry obtained between the two groups throughout their mutual existence, but they were ultimately supportive of each other. BMUG's first foray onto BCS-Mac's Boston home turf, at MacWorld Expo on August 11–13 of 1987 was commemorated with a new T-shirt, featuring an inscription "BMUG in Boston" which Bill Woodcock, who designed BMUG's T-shirts, intended to look like graffiti, using a rattle-can to write the original text in black paint on white paper, which was then photographed, scanned, and converted to PostScript in Adobe illustrator, before being silkscreened in red on black shirts. The red-on-black effect, however, was said by startled BCS-Mac members to more resemble dripping blood than spray-paint.

=== 1995–1997 budget crisis ===
By 1995, BMUG had accumulated a debt of $250,000, which forced a two-year period of restructuring and the layoff of some of the staff, but which was weathered successfully.

== Closure and legacy ==
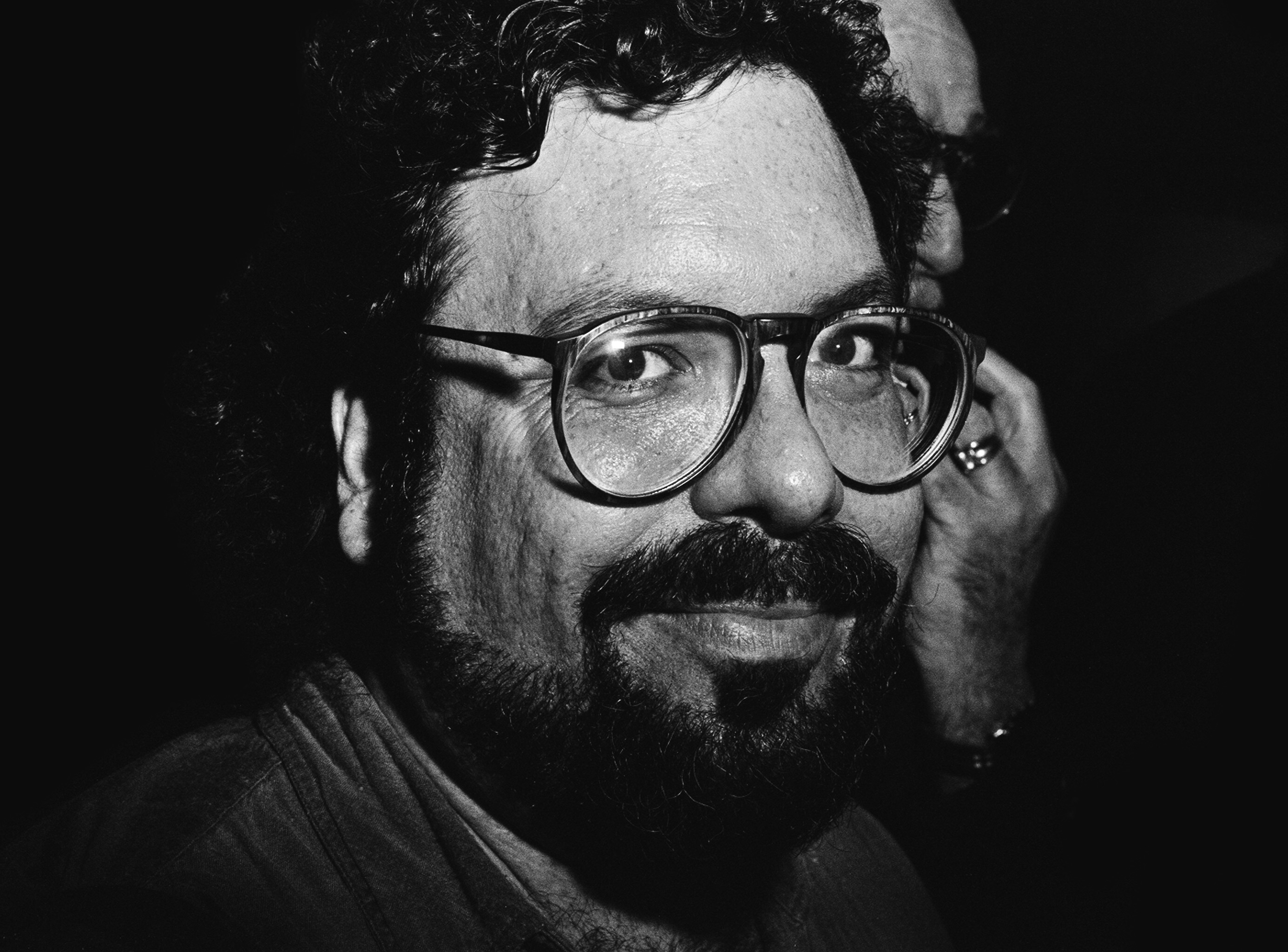
MacWEEK editor and BMUG volunteer David Morgenstern, at a BMUG party in the Frank Lloyd Wright Circle Gallery building, San Francisco, January 1989

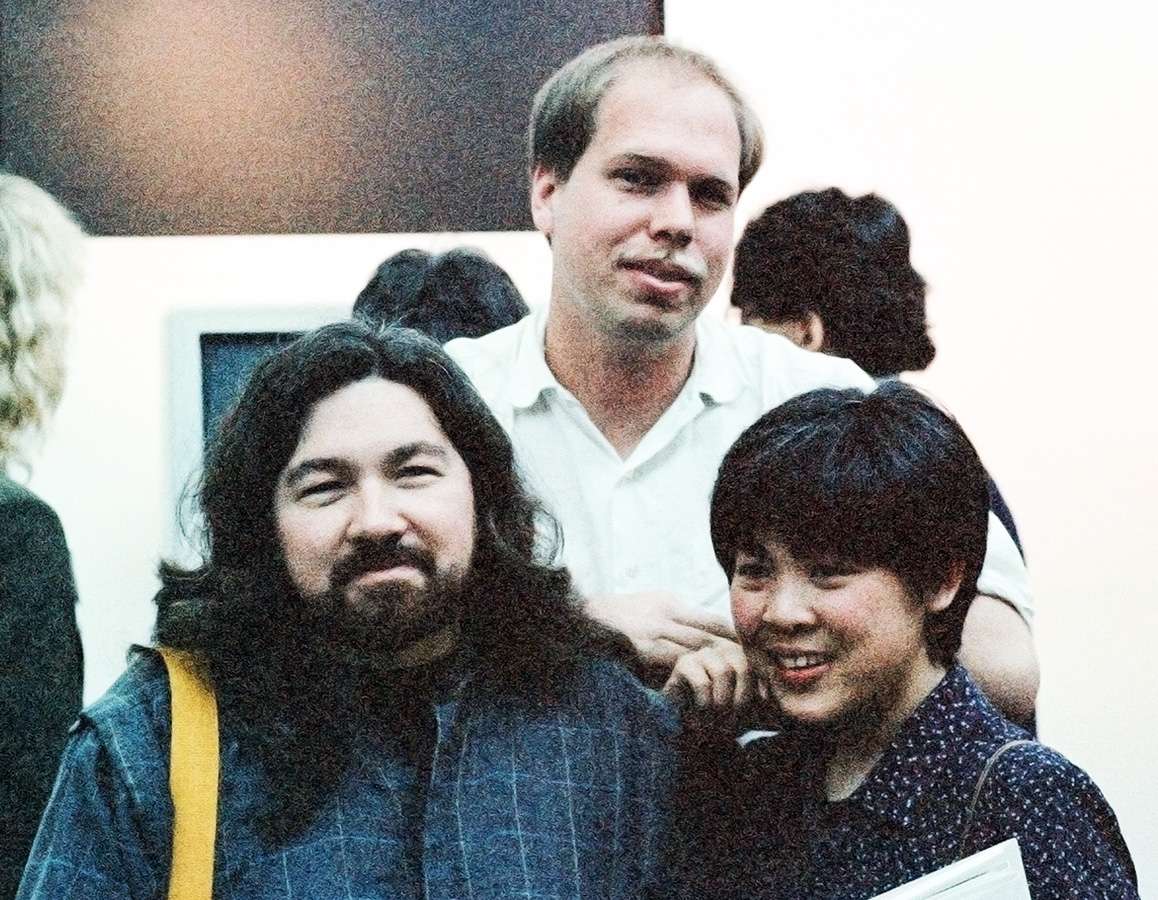
BMUG volunteers Herb Dang, Bernt Wahl, and Jennifer Hom, at MacWorld Expo San Francisco, 1988

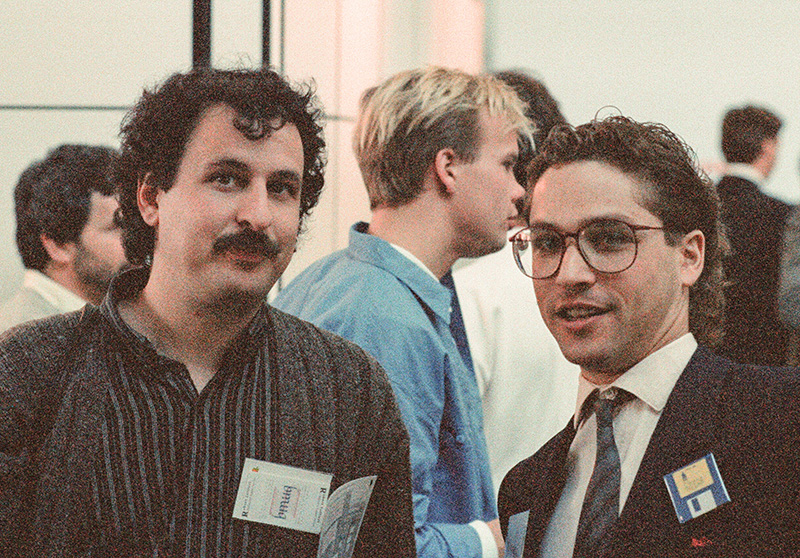
BMUG volunteers Robert Lettieri and David Schwartz at MacWorld Expo San Francisco, January 1990

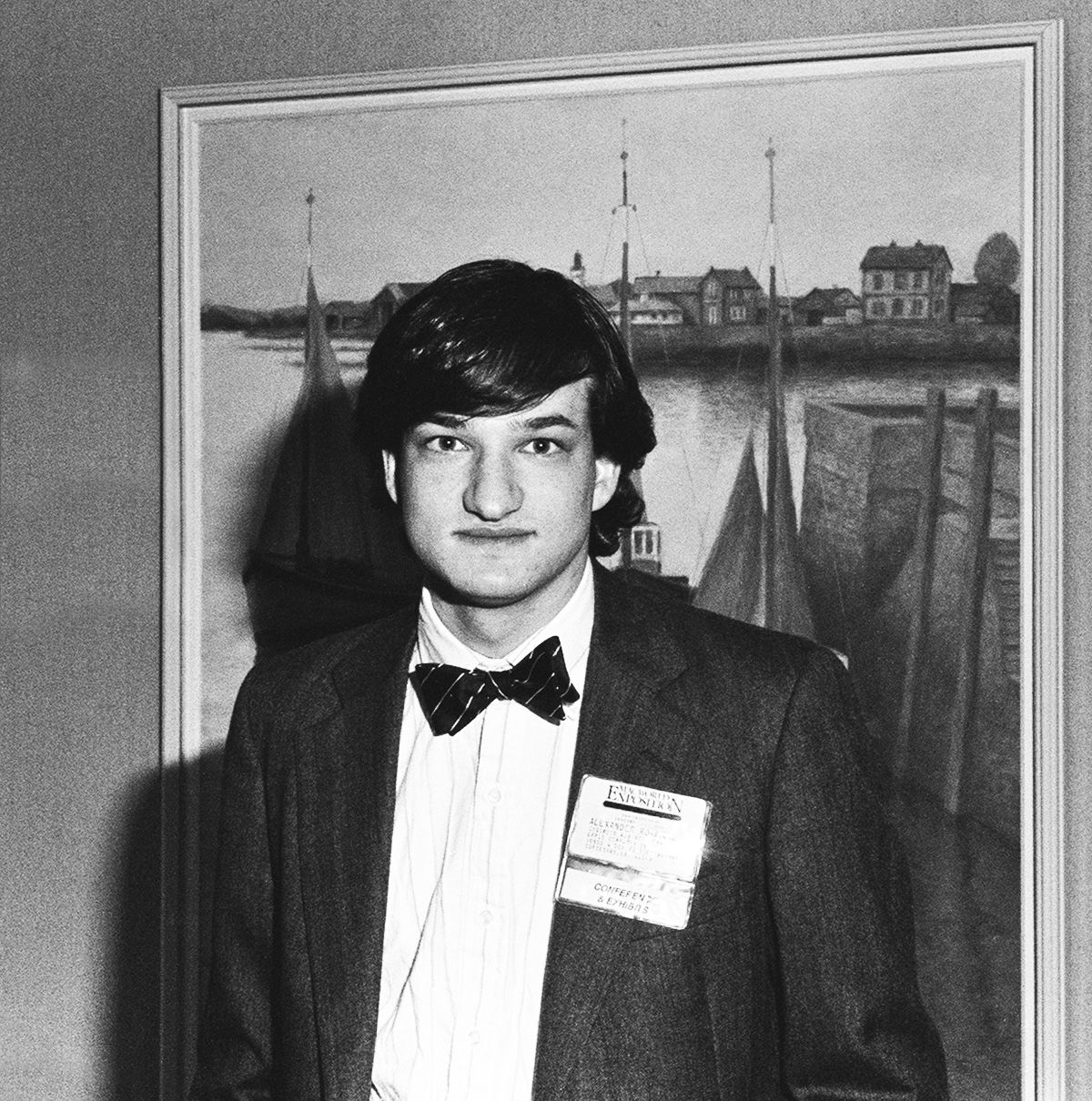
BMUG member and volunteer Alex Rosenberg, at a BMUG party in the Frank Lloyd Wright Circle Gallery building, San Francisco, January 1989

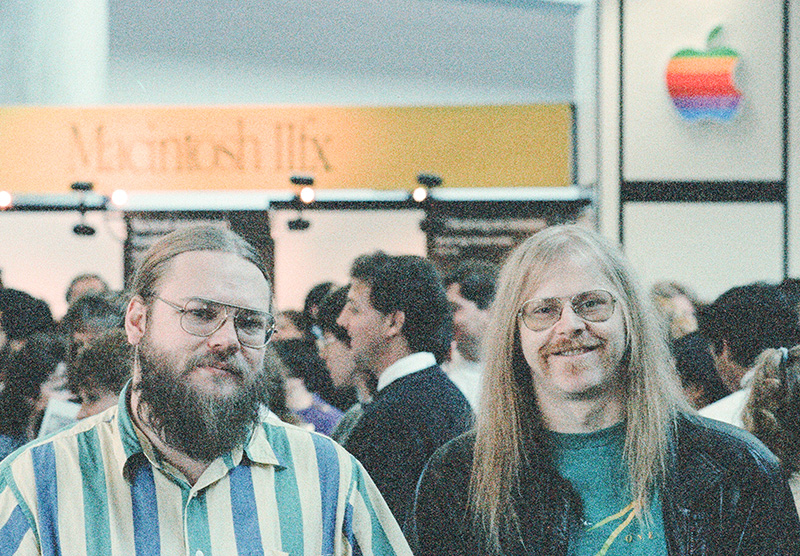
BMUG members Steve Francine and Chuck Farnham (author of the first commercial HyperCard stack) at the Macintosh IIfx announcement, MacWorld Expo San Francisco, January 1990

With the increasing cost of printing the biannual newsletter, decreasing membership and the waning sales of software due to the rise of the Internet, revenues could not keep up and the not-for-profit corporation declared bankruptcy in 2000. However, its members continued to collaborate and meet as separate entities in the following years.

- the San Francisco branch continued as BMUGWest until their closure in March 2016.
- the South Bay branch continues as Silicon Valley MUG, still active in 2024.
- Members purchased the group's online presence (the BMUG BBS) and kept it running as PlanetMUG, in conjunction with The BostonBBS (formerly the Boston Computer Society's Mac BBS), until PlanetMUG shut down in early 2023.

== See also ==
- Category:Berkeley Macintosh Users Group members
