= Apple community =

Community for Apple Inc. and its products

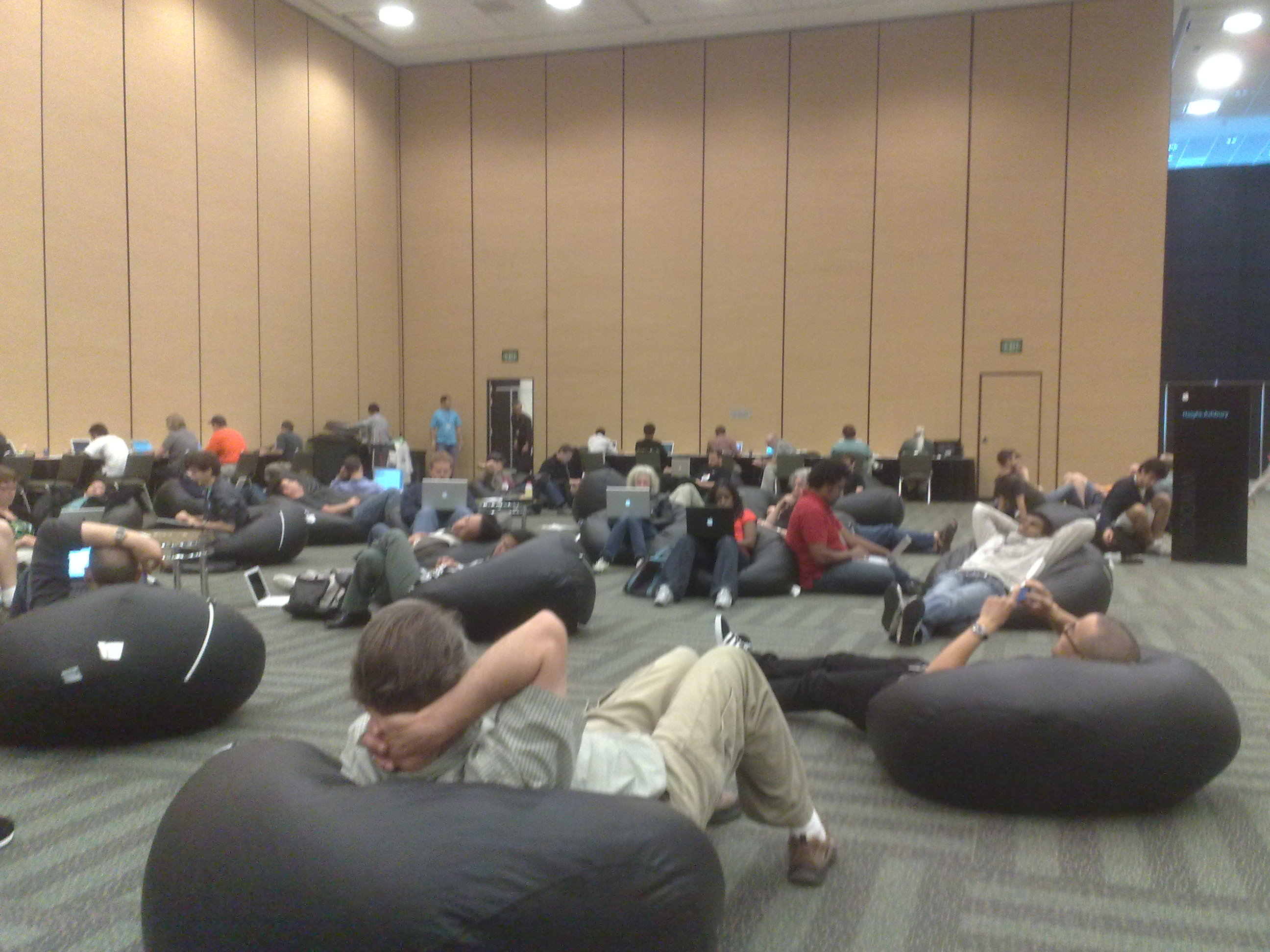
Apple users at the 2008 Worldwide Developers Conference (WWDC)

The Apple community consists of the users, media, and third party companies interested in Apple and its products. They discuss rumors, future products, news stories, and support of Apple's products. Apple has a devoted following, especially for the Apple II, Mac, iPod, iPhone, and luminary staff members. The personal computer revolution, mixed with Apple's vertical integration of its products and services, has increased popularity. Apple's corporate policy of extreme secrecy about future products intensify interest in the company's activities.

== Magazines ==
Before the popular use of the internet, early Apple-related publications were available in traditional print media form, often but not always moving later to online publication.

MacLife (stylized as Mac|Life) is a San Francisco-based American publication, originally known as MacAddict between September 1996 and February 2007. Published by Future US, it started as a monthly magazine, focusing on the Macintosh personal computer and other related Apple products. While originally a print publication, it is now exclusively a digital–only product, or available through their app which can be obtained via the App Store.

MacUser is a print magazine that was published biweekly and then monthly by Dennis Publishing Ltd. and licensed by Felden in the UK. Its content is for Mac users in the design sector, with its Masterclass tutorials and technical advice. It began publishing in 1985, ceasing publication in 2015. In 1985, Felix Dennis's Dennis Publishing, the creators of MacUser in the UK, licensed its name and mouse-rating symbol to Ziff-Davis Publishing for use worldwide as a completely separate publication, later consolidated into Macworld.

Macworld is one of the oldest magazine publications focused on Apple products and software, starting in 1984. It received competition with the launch of the US version of MacUser magazine the following year. The two magazines merged as Macworld in 1997. In September 2014, it discontinued its print edition, instead focusing on its website and YouTube coverage.

== Online publishers ==
9to5Mac was founded in 2007 by Seth Weintraub as an Apple news website originally focused on Macs in the enterprise. Since then, the website has expanded to covering all things Apple. 9to5Mac is known as the leading website within the Apple News Community in terms of breaking impactful news. The site gained fame in its earlier years for publishing the first photos of the third-generation iPod nano, the original iPod touch, early photos of the first iPhone, and details about Apple's still-in-use aluminum manufacturing process for laptops. In recent years, 9to5Mac published the first accurate details about the iPhone 4S, Siri, Apple's move from Google Maps to Apple Maps, new health and fitness applications, OS X/macOS updates, and the Apple Watch. The site also published the first photos of the white iPad 2, iPhone 5, and the iPad Air.

AppleInsider launched in 1997 as a news and rumor website for Apple products and services at appleinsider.com. It includes a forum for discussion of news stories and other community news. In the late 1990s, Apple successfully sued John Doe from AppleInsider's boards with the username "Worker Bee" for revealing information on what became the Apple Pro Mouse. It is a rare case of Apple following through on threats of a suit. The case was settled out of court.

iMore was an Apple-enthusiast website founded in 2008, previously as Phonedifferent, with its main focus on all aspects of Apple devices (also featuring sections on several other platforms). February 2019, Future plc bought Mobile Nations including the titles Android Central, iMore, Windows Central and Thrifter for $115 million. Gerald Lynch was the final editor in chief. It was run by editor-in-chief Rene Ritchie with a small editing staff until 2020; Joseph Keller was the editor until mid-2022. Along with the usual news and rumors, iMore often featured in-depth technical details of Apple software and operating systems, aimed at explaining to readers how and why certain things have been done by Apple, in their wider context of achieving better usability and design goals. It ceased publication and closed its member forums on November 1, 2024. As of May 2026, articles are viewable and forum link redirects to home page.

Low End Mac is an Apple-centric website founded in 1997 to support Mac users with early Mac hardware and growing over time to cover the entire range of Macs, as each line eventually had model years falling into the “vintage and obsolete” category. Low End Mac's primary focus is on aging Apple gear, primarily Macs, but touching on iPhone, iPad, iPod, Apple TV, and other devices as well. It is published by its founder Daniel Knight with a small volunteer writing staff.

MacDailyNews launched in September 2002. MacDailyNews was cited by CNet as its source for the launch of the first Verizon (CDMA-capable) iPhone after Christmas, 2010; the phone was announced by Verizon in early 2011. It was cited by MacRumors with a forecast for the second generation Mac Pro in April 2013; Apple announced it in June.

MacOS Rumors was founded by Ethan C. Allen in 1995 as the first known "Apple rumors" website on the early web. His early work was noticed and referenced by other print media including CNET, Forbes, and Mac the Knife in MacWEEK. Allen was only 16 at the time but had developed extensive source contacts. Apple was unhappy with some of the releases on the site which proved to be early and accurate. Apple requested several times that he stop releasing data from his sources. After a brief shutdown of the site at the request of Apple, MacOS Rumors was obtained by Ryan Meader after a domain expiration within two years of its creation. Originally with Ethan, the site posted most of its rumors based on screenshots and info sent via email from followers. With Ryan at the helm, MacOS Rumors collected content from message boards and Usenet posts but later claimed (unsubstantiated) to have developed contacts inside Apple. After several successful years, MacOS Rumors gained a reputation for being inaccurate. After the MacOS Rumors site was obtained by Ryan in 1997, Ethan tried to briefly return to Apple rumors with his sources by creating a new website titled Mac Rumor Mill. Apple quickly caught onto the new site and was able to shut it down with threatened legal action.

MacRumors was launched in February 2000 by Arnold Kim, as an aggregator of Mac-related rumors and reports around the web. MacRumors attempts to keep track of the rumor community by consolidating reports and cross-referencing claims, along with having extensive online forums for most Apple products and services.

SecureMac was founded in 1999 as a Mac-oriented security news portal. The site has expanded to cover a wide range of digital security and privacy topics, but has retained its focus on Apple products and software. In 2016, SecureMac launched The Checklist, a weekly security-themed podcast aimed at iOS and macOS users. SecureMac has been credited with discovering several significant macOS threats, including the Boonana Trojan, a new variant of the rogue security program Mac Defender.

Think Secret launched in 1999. Apple filed a lawsuit against the company alleging it printed stories containing Apple trade secrets. In December 2007, the lawsuit was settled with no sources being disclosed; however, the site was shut down, finally closing on February 14, 2008. In the year leading up to the closing of the site, Think Secret correctly predicted an aluminum shell iMac, development of a touchscreen based iPod starting in 2006, and the relative BlackBerry-esque form factor of the new iPod Nano. However, there were still some reports that turned out to be false, such as its prediction of the demise of the Mac Mini, when it received an upgrade in mid-2007.

TidBITS was founded by Adam Engst and Tonya Engst in April 1990, making it the oldest online Apple publication and the second-oldest Internet publication. TidBITS covers Apple news and publishes detailed technical advice for users. It started as an email newsletter before the rise of the Web, began publishing on the Web in 1994, and continues to provide information via both the Web and weekly email distribution.

The Unofficial Apple Weblog (TUAW) was founded in 2004, and claimed to be "a resource for all things Apple and beyond". TUAW published news stories, credible rumors, and how-tos covering a variety of topics daily. TUAW was known for its rumor roundups, seeking to dispel false Apple rumors from around the web. On February 3, 2015, TUAW was shut down by its owners, Weblogs, Inc. In July 2024, its domain name was sold to ad agency Web Orange Limited (WOL) and was reused as an AI-generated content farm.

The Mac Observer publishes Mac, iPhone, and Apple related news, reviews, tips, and podcasts. The site was launched on December 29, 1998, by Dave Hamilton and Bryan Chaffin. The site has evolved from just providing news and reviews to now hosting popular podcasts, columns, and more.

== Macintosh User Groups ==
Macintosh User Groups (MUGs) are groups of Macintosh users, that started after the 1985 creation of the Apple User Group Connection (AUGC).

== France ==
Former Macintosh division lead Jean-Louis Gassée, a Frenchman, was an advocate in France for personal computing, and contributed to Apple's "remarkable" success in that country.

Until 2007, the Apple Expo trade show was held yearly in Paris, and attended by Apple to hold several keynotes.

French Apple news sites include Mac4Ever, MacBidouille, MacGeneration, and MacPlus.

In 1996, Macworld bought Golden magazine, and renamed it Macworld France. Two years later, it was renamed Univers Macworld after merging with the Univers Mac magazine; in 2003, the French version of the magazine changed its name to Macworld. Bernard Le Du, a French Macworld journalist, later started his own magazine, Vous et votre Mac. Àvosmac is another notable French magazine, which went online-only in 2017.

== Apple evangelists ==
We worked with at least two or three of the Apple evangelists along the way, and that was a very different experience for us. We hadn’t realized that technology could be a secular religion ... Believe me, if you haven't contacted the Mac zealots, you haven't lived. It's literally a secular religion, and they are deadly serious. They've forgotten it’s a computer program somewhere along the line.

— Dave Fulton of Fox Software, 1988

An Apple evangelist is a technology evangelist for Apple products. The term software evangelist was coined by Mike Murray of the Macintosh division. Apple's first evangelist was Mike Boich, a member of the original Macintosh development team. Alain Rossmann succeeded him. Their job was to promote Apple products, primarily by working with third-party developers. Boich and Rossmann later cofounded Radius.

One prominent Apple evangelist is Apple Fellow Guy Kawasaki. He is credited as one of the first to use evangelism marketer of a computer platform through a weblog. Apple formerly had a "Why Mac?" evangelist site. The company subsequently ran Get a Mac, which gave numerous reasons why "PC users" should switch to Macs. Several third-parties still host and maintain Apple evangelism websites, many of which are listed above. The AppleMasters program was a similar endeavor in the late nineties.

In the early days of the Macintosh computer, the primary function of an evangelist was to convince software developers to write software products for the Macintosh. When software developers need help from within Apple, evangelists will often act as go-betweens, helping the developers to find the right people at Apple to talk to. This role is now filled by the Apple Developer program, led by Phil Schiller.

== Apple's response ==
Apple's official stance on speculation around future product releases is to refrain from discussing any products or outside speculation until release. Historically, Apple has often used legal means, such as cease and desist orders, in order to retain trade secrets, intellectual property, or confidential corporate information, when needed. Typically, Apple has primarily pursued the leakers of information themselves, rather than any sites containing rumors on their products. However, Apple's suit against Think Secret in 2005 targeted whether these sites have the right to knowingly publish this protected information. Staff are also required to sign non-disclosure clauses within the company.

During his January 10, 2006, keynote address to the Macworld Conference & Expo in San Francisco, Apple CEO Steve Jobs lampooned the rumor community by pretending to create a "Super Secret Apple Rumors" podcast during his demonstration of new features in GarageBand.

On October 16, 2014, at an Apple Special Event keynote, Craig Federighi pretended to "triple down on secrecy" by hiring Stephen Colbert as Supreme Commander of Secrecy. He lampooned the "spaceship" rumors.
