= CAT1 =

CAT1 or Cat 1 may refer to:

- Category 1 cable, unshielded twisted pair type cable
- Atwood/Coghlin Airport (ICAO airport code)
- Cat #1 (album), an album by Peter Criss
- LTE Cat 1, a cellular technology
- Carnitine acyltransferase I, an enzyme
