= PhoneNET =

Implementation of AppleTalk's physical layer

Farallon PhoneNET adapter

PhoneNET is a discontinued implementation of the AppleTalk networking physical layer created by the Berkeley Macintosh Users Group (BMUG) and commercialized by Farallon Computing. It uses conventional four-conductor telephone Category 1 patch cords and RJ-11 modular connectors in place of Apple's LocalTalk. It was far more popular than Apple's implementation before the widespread implementation of Ethernet.

== Description ==
When Apple introduced AppleTalk in 1985, the networking technology used a proprietary connector and cabling system based on shielded twisted pair 4-conductor cables with three-pin mini-DIN connectors connecting to the computer using an external dongle plugged into one of the Macintosh's RS-422 ports. The dongles includes terminating resistors that allows the network to be connected together without having to know where the ends are. Originally known as "AppleTalk Personal Network", the system was later renamed LocalTalk.

Later that year, Reese M. Jones of the Berkeley Macintosh Users Group created an alternative dongle that connects together using conventional telephone cabling with RJ-11 connectors. The dongles are not self-terminating, but as a result, they are also less complex. Connecting together a network using these "BMUGnet" was much less expensive than using Apple's system and can often be accomplished using existing telephone wiring already installed in buildings. Jones filed a patent on the system in August 1986.

Jones assigned the patent to Farallon, which introduced the product as PhoneNet. This was supplanted, and then replaced, by PhoneNet Plus, which switched from the original Macintosh's DE-9 serial port connection to the Macintosh Plus' new Mini-DIN 8, which remained in use until the Power Macintosh G3 systems. Farallon also introduced the PhoneNET StarController, available in 12 and 24-port versions, which isolates traffic between nodes to improve performance. Later versions of the PhoneNet adaptors feature modified cases to match the case style of the StarControllers.

Unlike LocalTalk, which only supports a daisy chain topology, PhoneNET also supports trunk and star network topologies. Like LocalTalk, the maximum speed for data transfer is 230 kbit/s unless accelerating drivers were used to override the operating system's drivers.

== Functionality ==
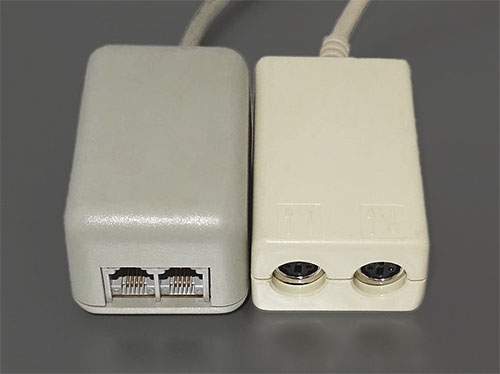
Farallon PhoneNET and Apple LocalTalk transceivers. Both connect computing devices (like Macintoshes and LaserWriter printers) with serial ports to LocalTalk local area networks. The Farallon transceiver does so over ANSI/TIA-568 standard structured cabling plants, while the Apple transceiver uses a short-range proprietary daisy chain.

Unlike LocalTalk's four-wire grounded implementation, PhoneNET uses a single twisted pair, or the outside two wires of a four-conductor flat cable.

As normal telephone equipment uses the yellow and black wires in cabling while voice uses green and red, PhoneNET can share cabling with telephones, allowing both phone calls and networking over a single cable. Cable connectors lock together unlike AppleTalk Personal Network, reducing disconnections.

== Decline ==
Apple eventually created a new protocol, dubbed Ethertalk, to allow the AppleTalk protocol to be used over Ethernet cables. Hardware adapters to bridge LocalTalk (and by extension PhoneNET) and Ethertalk, were made by third-party companies such as Asanté and Farallon. In 1994 Apple released a free piece of software, LocalTalk Bridge to perform the same function, which could be run on computers with System 7.1 through Mac OS 9.

The original 1998 iMac was the first Macintosh to remove the Mini-DIN 8 serial port in favor of USB, and as such it and subsequent Apple computers would not be compatible with either PhoneNET or LocalTalk.

== Reception ==
By 1988 PhoneNET was so widely used that when PC Magazine evaluated TOPS, it used PhoneNET wiring without mentioning LocalTalk.

The University of Michigan Computing Center in 1988 recommended PhoneNET over LocalTalk, citing its much lower installation cost by using telephone cabling, longer network distance, and more flexible topology. The university's telephone department was able to use existing telephone cabling to install PhoneNET networks without affecting phone service.
