= Darkin (video game) =

2014 video game

- Developers: Ten Foiled Hats UG Haftungsbeschraenkt & Co
- Publishers: Ten Foiled Hats UG Haftungsbeschraenkt & Co
- Platform: iOS
- Release: May 15, 2014
- Genre: puzzle-RPG

Darkin is an iOS game developed by German indie studio Ten Foiled Hats UG Haftungsbeschraenkt & Co KG and released on May 15, 2014.

== Critical reception ==
The game has a Metacritic score of 85% based on 4 critic reviews.

TouchArcade wrote "Darkin is a very well-made attempt at capturing the spirit of a somewhat-neglected App Store great, and it hits considerably more than it misses. I think it falls a little short of the mark of replacing Dungeon Raid completely, but that still leaves it in a pretty great place." 148Apps said "Darkin is a darn fine puzzle-RPG that will suck up all your free time." Apple'N'Apps wrote "Darkin is a finely crafted matching adventure that stands by itself for an engaging experience that is a should buy." Pocket Gamer UK said "A well put together match-three puzzler with a solid RPG built around it, Darkin is well worth some time and effort."
