= MacRumors =

News website focused on Apple, Inc.

- Logo of MacRumors, a stylized apple featuring a question mark

- Screenshot
- Website type: News website
- Available in: English
- Headquarters: Glen Allen, Virginia
- Country of origin: United States
- Owners: MacRumors.com, LLC
- Founder: Arnold Kim
- Editor: Eric Slivka
- Key people: Juli Clover; Joe Rossignol; Tim Hardwick; Hartley Charlton; Mitchel Broussard; Dan Barbera
- Employees: 14
- Website: macrumors.com
- Commercial: Yes
- Registration: Optional, required to post on the forums
- Users: 1.1 million forum users^{a}
- Launched: February 24, 2000; 26 years ago
- Current status: Active
- ^{a} Total forum members (August 2023).

MacRumors is an American website that reports and aggregates news, rumors, and information about Apple Inc. and its products including Mac and iPhone.

The website is updated on a daily basis with new articles. It also provides a selection of other content including guides, tutorials, videos, and a podcast. MacRumors is a prominent website within the Apple community, featuring a popular forum with over one million members. It has been credited with helping to build a positive community around Apple.

The site was founded in February 2000 by Arnold Kim and remains a privately owned publication. Kim has been profiled in publications including The New York Times and hailed as "Apple Rumor King" owing to his work on MacRumors.

The company's headquarters are located in Glen Allen, Virginia, but the editorial staff work remotely from around the world. Eric Slivka is the site's editor-in-chief. As of 2023, MacRumors had 11 full-time employees.

MacRumors has been credited as a pioneering blog, by Dan Frommer in Business Insider. In the New York Times, Brian Stelter described it as one of the most popular technology websites. Douglas A. McIntyre described it as a valuable blog. and Brian X. Chen in Wired called it a high traffic Apple-centric blog. McIntyre also mentioned that MacRumors knows "more about Apple than Apple management does".

MacRumors and its editors are frequently ranked among the top technology news publications and authors on technology news aggregator Techmeme, and its work is often cited by mainstream news outlets like CNBC, Bloomberg, and others. The website's editors have distinct styles.

== Content ==
=== News and rumors ===
MacRumors publishes news articles about Apple, including, but not limited to, its product development operations, software, services, supply chain, corporate affairs, and retail aspects. During Apple events, where the company unveils new products and services, MacRumors operates a liveblog and publishes articles in real-time.

The site has grown considerably through the years, but the basic format hasn't changed. The news and rumor focus has remained generally consistent. In fact, I've always prided myself on the selectivity of the news we choose to report on and how seriously we take our reporting.

— Arnold Kim, 2011

In addition to Apple's official developments, MacRumors curates rumors and reports from other sources. Apple has an intense culture of corporate secrecy that drives interest in its upcoming product announcements and speculation. As such, reporting sourced information about Apple's plans comprises a major element of MacRumors' coverage.

By consolidating reports and cross-referencing claims, MacRumors aims to keep track of Apple news and rumors as they develop. For example, the website attempts to infer the design of next-generation Apple products before the launch. The features and attributes of the iPod, MacBook, iPhone, and Apple Watch were revealed on MacRumors "long before" Apple launched them. It scrutinizes the source of information posted on the website and uses an evidence-based approach, assessing track records, corroboration, and plausibility of rumors in relation to Apple's past behavior and overall history – seeking to provide an accurate picture of the company's behind-the-scenes endeavors.

MacRumors primarily functions as an aggregator of rumors from other sources rather than posting exclusive leaks to avoid legal difficulties. Nevertheless, MacRumors occasionally breaks original stories, such as revealing the name of the iPad using trademark filings in prior to its announcement in 2010.

=== Buyer's Guide ===
Apple does not provide advance warning of when product updates are imminent. MacRumors hosts a specialized "Buyer's Guide" to help average shoppers avoid buyer's remorse by clarifying when is a good time to buy a particular Apple device based on the timing of its introduction, how long the company usually waits to refresh the product, and rumors about impending hardware updates.

=== Forum ===
MacRumors is home to a large, community-oriented Apple- and Mac-focused forum with over 1.1 million forum members and over 31 million forum posts as of August 2023.

=== Videos and podcast ===
MacRumors has a corresponding YouTube channel hosted by video producer Dan Barbera that provides content related to the website's coverage, including noteworthy Apple rumors, new product launches, reviews, tutorials, and more. As of August 2023, the MacRumors YouTube channel has over half a million subscribers and 152 million video views.

MacRumors also has a weekly podcast, titled The MacRumors Show, that discusses the latest Apple news. It is hosted by Barbera and senior editor Hartley Charlton, and the podcast is offered in both audio and video formats on various platforms. The podcast often features prominent YouTubers and industry figures as guests, such Rene Ritchie, iJustine, and John Gruber. It is distributed by AudioBoom.

== Business ==
MacRumors is a high-traffic monetized internet business that offers banner ads, conducts affiliate marketing, and sells video, newsletter, and podcast sponsorship. Forum members can purchase a paid membership subscription that allows users to filter front page stories according to their preferences, remove all ads, get access to private forums, and help to support the site.

As of April 30, 2012, according to Quantcast, MacRumors received an average 65,890,912 page views globally per month, and 7,567,679 visitors per month globally. The website continues to have tens of millions of unique visitors every month.

== Market influence ==
At least two independent studies have directly linked MacRumors coverage of news and rumors to Apple (ticker symbol "AAPL") stock returns. Its impact is lessened during the period following Apple's official announcements because "new information has already been received and absorbed by the market through previous leakages". While comments posted on MacRumors articles have also been correlated with returns, positive comments have a lower impact on Apple's stock returns than negative and neutral comments.

== History ==
=== 2000s ===
Kim conceived of MacRumors during the dot-com bubble as a hobby. He launched MacRumors as a solo enterprise on February 24, 2000 during his fourth and final year of medical school at the Medical College of Virginia, requiring "little financing". The site was initially designed as an independent blog to dissect the secrets of Apple, his favorite technology company. It was originally based on Slashdot.

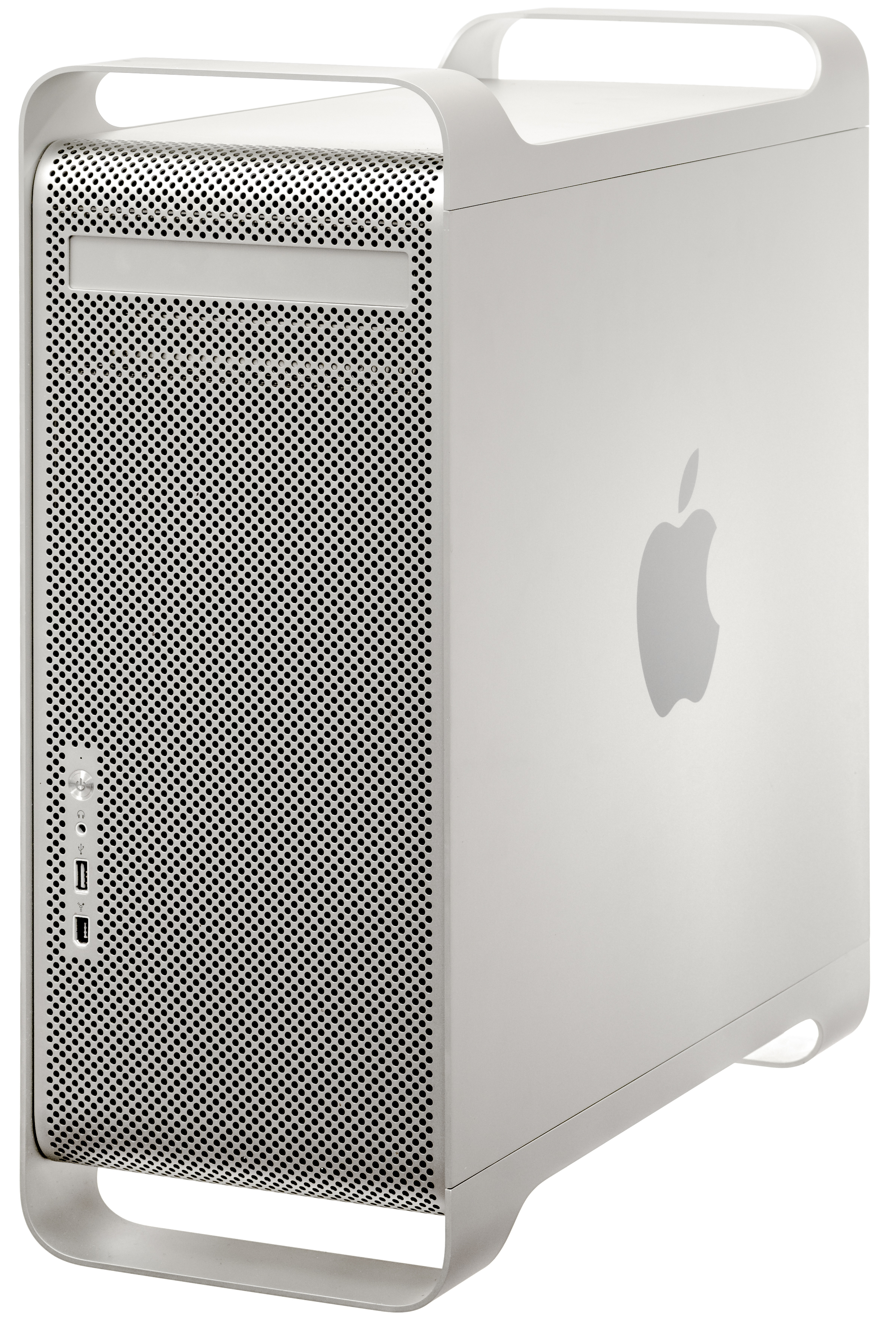
Apple Power Mac G5

In 2002, Kim screenshot and published details about schematic drawings of a new, aluminum case for the Power Mac G5 that were initially posted on MacRumors' forum. Apple sent Kim a takedown request and he complied, but the news had already spread. The following year, Kim received a subpoena to hand over information with regards to the leak. An Apple contract worker was subsequently charged with misappropriation of trade secrets in connection to the case.

In 2002, some forum members complained about political discussion taking over the website, leading to the opening of a specific politics subforum. The subforum was closed in 2003 but reopened as a Politics, Religion, Social Issues subforum with stricter rules shortly thereafter. Around 2003 to 2004, ad revenue from the site started growing significantly. In 2005, MacRumors started "turning a substantial profit".

During his January 10, 2006 keynote address to the Macworld Conference & Expo in San Francisco, Apple CEO Steve Jobs poked fun at the rumor community by pretending to create a "Super Secret Apple Rumors" podcast during his demonstration of new features in GarageBand.

Apple's introduction of the iPhone in 2007 marked a turning point for MacRumors. While it had grown significantly before 2007, the launch of the iPhone opened up widespread public interest in Apple's products. The site then grew to a volume of traffic that was sustainable in terms of revenue.

Kim worked on MacRumors part-time as a hobby until 2008, when he gave up his job at a private nephrology practice in Richmond to work on the site full-time. While he had some assistance from part-time freelancers, Kim was doing everything for the site—editorially and technologically—himself. MacRumors reached around 40 million pageviews per month later that year. The 2008 financial crisis did not "tangibly" affect MacRumors.

Advertising revenue rose further in 2009 and 2010. Eric Slivka was MacRumors' first full-time member of staff, hired by Kim in early 2009. Later that year, the company hired four full-time employees, increasing the site's capacity to cover Apple news and rumors.

During the Macworld 2009 keynote, the site's live coverage on the separate domain MacRumorsLive.com was hacked to insert inappropriate content into the text and photo live feeds, some of which related to the health of Apple CEO Steve Jobs. The incident was particularly controversial because it came amid multiple false reports of Jobs' death. MacRumors ended its coverage early and the episode provoked a volatile reaction on Twitter. Kim apologized following the event. It subsequently emerged that the hackers appeared to be associated with imageboard site 4chan.

=== 2010s ===
In 2010, MacRumors celebrated its 10th anniversary and set out plans for a site redesign that came into effect the following year. In May 2010, the website reached 10 million forum posts and 438,000 forum members, and was ranked among the top 500 U.S. websites. The site also launched its first annual blood drive, seeking to encourage members of the Apple community to donate blood.

Following several scandals, discussion of alleged worker exploitation by Apple suppliers captured the MacRumors forums in 2010. In 2012, a study by the Erasmus School of Economics found that MacRumors articles have an impact on Apple stock returns.

While MacRumors has had a YouTube channel since January 17, 2006, it did not begin regularly posting original video content until September 2014.

On October 16, 2014 at an Apple Special Event keynote, senior vice president of software engineering Craig Federighi pretended to "triple down on secrecy" by hiring Stephen Colbert as "Supreme Commander of Secrecy." He poked fun at "spaceship" rumors related to the construction of Apple Park, seemingly referring to the rumor community supported by the website.

In 2019, a study by researchers at Columbia University and The Chinese University of Hong Kong linked MacRumors' coverage to Apple's stock returns. It concluded that MacRumors "significantly influences Apple's abnormal returns".

=== 2020s ===
In 2020, MacRumors celebrated its 20th anniversary. By the end of the year, the site had 11 full-time employees.

In July 2021, MacRumors announced that it was immediately closing down its Politics, Religion, Social Issues forum, prohibiting all political and social issue discussions from the site with the exception of News stories that are explicitly categorized under Political News. MacRumors launched its podcast titled The MacRumors Show hosted by Barbera and Charlton in December 2021. The podcast's first guest was renowned Bloomberg reporter Mark Gurman.

In 2023, Kim was interviewed on an episode of The MacRumors Show podcast recorded in Orlando, Florida to discuss the history of the website. A special episode was recorded at the Apple Podcasts studio in Apple Park, California following the announcement of the Vision Pro mixed-reality headset. Barbera was given an early demo of the device.

== In popular culture ==
American actor, comedian, producer, and screenwriter Jason Segel is a MacRumors reader and often brings up his affection for the website publicly. In the DVD commentary for 2008 comedy film Forgetting Sarah Marshall, Segel told Mila Kunis that he enjoyed learning about Apple's upcoming releases and was a fan of MacRumors. "I love macrumors.com," Segel said, "it's tomorrow's Mac news today". The commentary jokingly suggested that he had a deal with MacRumors to promote the site. Kim was fond of the tagline invented by Segel, leading to it becoming officially adopted by the site.

When promoting "Otherworld" in 2017 alongside Kirsten Miller, Segel once again mentioned his fondness for MacRumors, commenting that "Every morning when I wake up I immediately go on to macrumors.com to see what's new".

== Sister sites ==
Mobile video game website TouchArcade is MacRumors' sister site since it is owned by Kim. He founded TouchArcade in 2008 with Blake Patterson. It shut down on September 16, 2024.

MacRumors and TouchArcade were also sister sites with App Store discovery and price tracking site AppShopper until June 2021, when Kim took the decision to shut it down. Apple was apparently discontented with services that aggregated and indexed information from the App Store.

== See also ==
- Apple community
- List of Internet forums
- TouchArcade
