= Farallon Computing =

American computer networking company

Netopia, Inc.
- Formerly: Farallon Computing, Inc. (1986–1998)
- Industry: Computer networking
- Founded: 1986
- Defunct: 2007
- Fate: Acquired by Motorola
- Website: netopia.com at the Wayback Machine (archived 2005-09-13)

Logo of Netopia, Inc., the name adopted in 1998

Farallon Computing, Inc., later Netopia, Inc., was an American computer networking company that produced a wide variety of products including bridges, repeaters and switches, and in its later Netopia incarnation, modems, routers, gateways, and Wi-Fi devices. The company also produced the NBBS (Netopia Broadband Server Software) and, as Farallon, Timbuktu remote administration software, as well as the MacRecorder, the first audio capture and manipulation products for the Macintosh (later sold to Macromedia). Farallon originated several notable technologies, including:

- PhoneNet, an implementation of AppleTalk over plain ("Cat-3") telephone wiring or, more commonly, EIA-TIA 568A/B structured cabling systems. Many versions of the product were produced, but the original product was a commercialized version of a kit developed and produced by BMUG, the Berkeley Macintosh Users Group in 1986.
- The StarController, a line of LocalTalk and Ethernet bridges and switches released in 1988 which integrated directly with EIA-TIA 568A/B structured cabling systems.
- EtherWave, an ADB-powered serial-to-ethernet bridge in a dongle form-factor which looked something like a manta ray. The two external ports were 10BASE-T and the serial pigtail spoke an overclocked 690 kbps version of LocalTalk. This served both to allow devices without expansion busses (commonly early Macintosh computers and LaserWriter printers) to connect directly to Ethernet networks, and also to allow the daisy-chaining of multiple devices from a single Ethernet switch or bridge port. Later versions used Apple's "AAUI" version of the Attachment Unit Interface to achieve full 10 mbps host connections.
- AirDock, a Serial-to-IrDA gateway which allowed devices with LocalTalk ports to communicate on IrDA infrared wireless networks.

Netopia acquired multiple companies in the home networking space including Cayman and Dobox. DoBox, Inc., founded by Nicole Toomey Davis, Bradley Davis and Matt Smith, was acquired in 2002 for its award-winning DoBox Family Firewall and Home Server Gateway.

== History ==
Farallon Computing was founded in 1986 in Berkeley. It subsequently moved its headquarters to Emeryville, California, and later still changed its name to Netopia in 1998.

Netopia was acquired by Motorola in the first quarter of 2007 for about $208 million.

ISPs known to use Netopia modems include:

- AT&T in the United States
- Sonic.net in the United States
- Covad in the United States
- eircom in Ireland
- Swisscom in Switzerland
- NextGenTel in Norway
- France Télécom, Cegetel RSS, B3G Telecom, Nerim, Easynet, Claranet, Magic Online in France
