= Mac the Knife =

Anonymous gossip columnist

Mac the Knife was the pen name (inspired by the homophonous well-known song "Mack the Knife") of an anonymous gossip columnist for the (now defunct) Apple Macintosh-focused trade publication MacWEEK. Mac the Knife was always written by a single writer, but the identity of that writer changed more than once over the long publishing history of MacWEEK. The column was known not only for its wide-ranging and often accurate Macintosh-related rumors, but for its gonzo, Hunter S. Thompson-like style.

Tipsters who provided juicy gossip were provided with coffee mugs emblazoned with the Knife's logo. During the column's heyday, the trophy mugs were occasionally sent randomly to Apple employees in order to obscure the true leakers.

MacWEEK's party at Macworld Conference & Expo was named for this fictional character. The party was often more secretive than Apple's own parties, to protect the identity of the Knife.

During the latter part of the Knife's career, his or her columns appeared on a website called The Electric Knife, which was published by Mac Publishing at mactheknife.com, but after the Knife's retirement, the domain expired. For some time, it was not associated with the Knife. Recently, it has been pointed at the defunct MacEdition homepage.

Today, none of the former Mac the Knife columnists write using this name. The columnist himself moved to MacEdition in 2000, penning a column called the "Naked Mole Rat Report" (an allusion to a phrase used in one of the Knife's last columns). The column seems to have ceased publication in 2003.

Many of the later Mac the Knife columns are still available from the Internet Archive's copy of the Electric Knife site.

== See also ==
- Apple rumors community
