= TouchArcade =

Mobile video game website

- Logo used since January 2012
- Website type: Mobile video game website
- Available in: English
- Dissolved: September 16, 2024
- Country of origin: United States
- Owners: TouchArcade.com, LLC
- Founder: Arnold Kim
- Editor: Jared Nelson
- Website: toucharcade.com
- Commercial: Yes
- Registration: Optional
- Launched: March 12, 2008; 18 years ago
- Current status: Dissolved

TouchArcade (stylized as toucharcade) is a mobile games journalism website. It was launched in 2008 as a sister site of MacRumors by its founder Arnold Kim and Blake Patterson. TouchArcade also hosts a forum and a weekly podcast. Its operations were shut down in 2024.

== History ==
TouchArcade was launched in 2008 as a blog by MacRumors founder Arnold Kim and Blake Patterson. The spinoff site "(tracked) the new games available for the iPhone and iPod Touch". It also included articles, reviews and a forum. Eli Hodapp became editor-in-chief in 2009.

In 2012, TouchArcade released an iOS app which included mobile game listings. In June 2015, TouchArcade launched a Patreon for crowdfunded donations. Hodapp explained that mobile game journalism has been struggling as developers shifted towards in-app advertising, and that ad revenue for the website was plummeting. Hodapp stepped down from his position in 2019 to focus on his role as co-founder of GameClub, and Jared Nelson succeeded him as editor-in-chief.

On September 16, 2024, TouchArcade announced that it would be shutting down its operations while keeping the website online.

== Reception ==
In 2009, CNET ranked TouchArcade sixth on its list of the top ten gaming blogs. Time named it one of The 50 Best Websites of 2011 and described its reviews as a "cogent, reliable guide" to the games in the App Store.
