= Michael Tchong =

American entrepreneur and writer

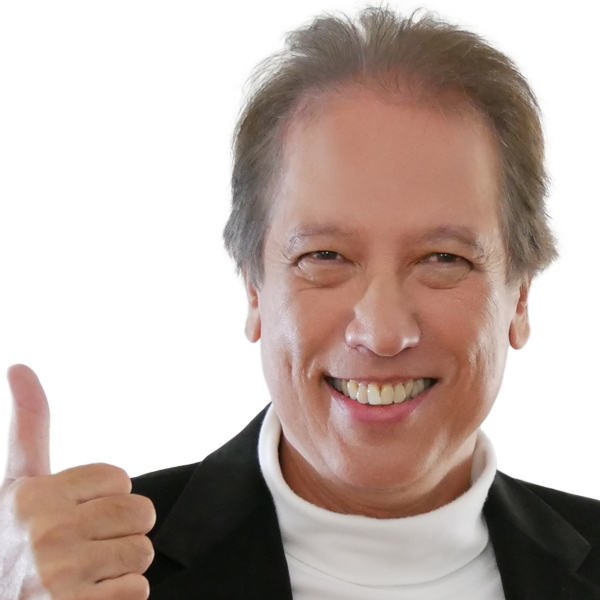
- Born: Michael Henricus Tchong; Oranjestad, Aruba
- Occupations: Analyst & Public Speaker; Founder of Social Revolution
- Known for: Founder of MacWEEK, ICONOCAST and Ubercool.

Michael Tchong is an American entrepreneur and writer, best known for his startups MacWEEK, Atelier Systems, CyberAtlas and ICONOCAST.

As a columnist for ReadWrite, Tchong has contributed "Why Aren't There More/Better Software Design Tools?", “World War III Is Already Here – And We’re Losing” and "Innovating The Email Inbox - Without Deleting All."

== Career ==
In 1992, Tchong founded Atelier Systems, which developed a new concept in contact management, called Hello. In 1987, he founded MacWEEK, which was later acquired by Ziff-Davis. In May 1996 he joined I/PRO (Internet Profiles Corp.), a startup focused on the nascent industry of website traffic auditing, after the company acquired his CyberAtlas website. I/PRO subsequently sold CyberAtlas to Mecklermedia in August 1998.

Tchong founded the Internet marketing company ICONOCAST in 1997. In January 1998 it was acquired by Imagine Media, whose CEO was Chris Anderson (entrepreneur), the founder of TED Talks. In January 1999, Imagine Media spun off Tchong's Internet marketing newsletter as ICONOCAST Inc., while retaining a minority interest.

On April 3, 2001, Tchong launched "Back the Net", a campaign to "save the Internet".

Since 2003 he has focused on trend-watching and public speaking. In November 2003, the UK's Telegraph proclaimed him "the most influential trend-spotter in America." His first book, Trendscape, was published in 2004.

Tchong has been quoted in publications including Adweek, Business Week, The New York Times, San Jose Mercury News, Tampa Bay Times, and USA Today, and has been featured on BBC News.

In 2019, he published his third book, “Ubertrends — How Trends And Innovation Are Transforming Our Future”.

In 2022, he launched Toolhacker LLC, an innovation lab.
