= Category 1 cable =

Type of twisted-pair cable

Category 1 cable, also known as Cat 1, Level 1, or voice-grade copper, is a grade of unshielded twisted pair cabling designed for telephone communications, and at one time was the most common on-premises wiring. The maximum frequency suitable for transmission over Cat 1 cable is 1 MHz, but Cat 1 is not currently considered adequate for data transmission (though it was at one time used for that purpose on the Apple Macintosh starting in the late 1980s in the form of Farallon Computing's//NetTopia's PhoneNet, an implementation of Apple's LocalTalk networking hardware standard).

Although not an official category standard established by TIA/EIA, Category 1 has become the de facto name given to Level 1 cables originally defined by Anixter International, the distributor. Cat 1 cable was typically used for networks that carry only voice traffic, for example telephones. Official TIA/EIA-568 standards have only been established for cables of Category 3 ratings or above.
