= Macintosh User Group =

Users' group

A Macintosh User Group (MUG) is a users' group of people who use Macintosh computers made by Apple Inc. or other manufacturers and who use the Macintosh operating system (OS). These groups are primarily locally situated and meet regularly to discuss Macintosh computers, the Mac OS, software and peripherals that work with these computers. Some groups focus on the older versions of Mac OS, up to Mac OS 9, but the majority now focus on the current version of Mac operating system, macOS.

== Activities ==
Macintosh user groups are independent organizations that elect their own leaders, develop and present topics at group meetings, schedule special events, frequently have a newsletter and/or web page, and other activities. MUGs generally have an affiliation with Apple Inc., which maintains a User Group Advisory Board consisting of MUG officers and members, who advise Apple on user group matters and relationships. Apple also maintains a MUG locator service on their website. MUGs may be community groups, government agencies, corporations, schools, universities, online, professional organizations, or software specific. Another website, the MUG Center, provides a variety of resources to MUGs and Mac users, including a comprehensive list of links to MUG websites.

Users' groups have been around since the early days of Apple, when computers were often just kits and the user groups met to learn how to put the computers together. Many early users' groups were Apple user groups that became MUGs when Apple started the Macintosh line of computers in 1984. The following is a 2005 list from the Apple User Group Locator of 19 still active MUGs that had initial meeting dates in 1975 - 1978 (note that these MUGs supported Apple products prior to the Macintosh computer line with original meeting dates that predate the Macintosh computer line):

- Apple Computer Information & Data Exchange of Rochester, Inc.,
- Apple Corps of Dallas,
- Apple Macintosh Users Group (Sydney),
- Apple Pugetsound Program Library Exchange,
- AppleRock,
- AppleSiders of Cincinnati,
- Apple Squires of the Ozarks,
- Apple Users' Society of Melbourne (AUSOM Inc),
- Charlotte Apple Computer Club,
- Colorado Macintosh User Group,
- The Northwest of Us Macintosh User Group Chicago, Northwest,
- Dallas Macintosh Users Group,
- Denver Apple Pi,
- Houston Area Apple User Group,
- Louisville Apple Users Group,
- Macintosh User Group of the Southern Tier,
- Maryland Apple Corps., Inc.,
- North Orange County Computer Club, MacIntosh SIG,
- Pennsylvania Macintosh User Group,
- The Michigan Apple,
- The Minnesota Apple Computer User Group,
- Washington Apple Pi, Ltd.

MUGs exploded in size in the 1980s and were a primary method of distribution of freeware and shareware software. Many MUGs had a "Disk-of-the-Month" and large newsletters for members. Computer hardware and software companies found MUGs to be a valuable place to provide information about their products. They were often speakers at MUG meetings. While many of these companies still speak at MUGs, the Internet has replaced many of the tools of information and software access that were not as available to the public prior to the late 1990s. Many MUGs have had to reinvent themselves to focus on tools a MUG can better provide, mostly focusing on education and/or hands on experiences. Today's MUGs are generally smaller, but have had some revitalization with the increased popularity of Apple Inc. products in the mid-2000s. Another educational competitor to MUGs has been Apple Inc.'s retail stores. Apple Inc. provides customers with professional assistance through their Genius Bar at Apple retail stores. The largest MUG was the Berkeley Macintosh Users Group, closely followed by the Macintosh SIG of the Boston Computer Society, and a friendly rivalry between the two groups energized both throughout the 1990s.

== See also ==
- Apple community
