= Bernt Wahl =

American mathematician

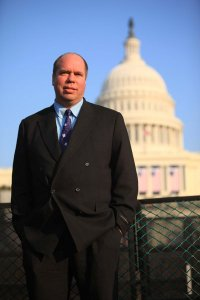
Bernt Wahl

Bernt Rainer Wahl is an American entrepreneur. Wahl studied mathematics and physics at University of California, Santa Cruz. He was chief executive officer of the company Factle. Wahl unsuccessfully ran for mayor of Berkeley, California in 2012 and 2016.
