= Dobox =

DoBox
- Company type: Public
- Website type: Entertainment on Demand service
- Available in: Multilingual
- Founded: March 23, 2013; 13 years ago Lisa Court, Lagos, NG
- Headquarters: 1 Ilaka Street, Ilupeju, Lagos, {{{location_country}}}
- Area served: Worldwide
- Founder: Gafar Williams
- CEO: Gafar Williams
- Industry: Entertainment
- Website: www.dobox.tv
- Advertising: Google, AdSense
- Registration: Required for Premium Content
- Launched: March 23, 2013; 13 years ago
- Current status: Active

Dobox is an entertainment on-demand (EOD) video and music streaming service. Dobox started as an indigenous, Nigerian-only, video streaming company, and began streaming other categories of movies in 2014. The company was established March 24, 2013 with its headquarters in Lagos, Nigeria. Dobox as partners with big telecommunications giants in Africa like MTN, Airtel, Glo and Etisalat.
