= Tidbits =

Apple Inc. news website and newsletter

Tidbits (styled TidBITS) is an electronic newsletter and web site dealing primarily with Apple Inc. and Macintosh-related topics.

== Internet publication ==
TidBITS has been published weekly since April 16, 1990, making it the longest-running Internet technology publication and the second-oldest Internet-only publication of any sort. In July 1992, TidBITS launched the first Internet advertising program, based on the PBS sponsorship model.

TidBITS is published by Adam C. Engst, author of a number of computer books, including four editions of Internet Starter Kit for Macintosh, Eudora for Windows & Macintosh Visual Quickstart Guide, and five editions of iPhoto for Mac OS X: Visual QuickStart Guide, along with a number of books in the Take Control series.

== Staff ==
The senior staff of TidBITS are:

- Adam C. Engst, CEO and publisher
- Tonya Engst, CFO

== Electronic books ==
From 2003 to 2017, TidBITS also published a series of electronic books in Adobe Acrobat (PDF), EPUB and Mobipocket (Kindle) formats that cover issues related to macOS and the digital lifestyle. The "Take Control Books" series first appeared in October 2003 with the publication of Take Control of Upgrading to Panther which was issued at the same moment as the official launch of Mac OS X version 10.3 Panther. Excerpts of the Take Control books can be downloaded free of charge, and some have been published in Macworld magazine.

The series includes many books for using and upgrading the various versions of Mac OS X and iPhone software; applications such as Apple Mail and iTunes; and general technology such as wireless security and choosing a digital camera.

There are also some wider lifestyle titles such as Take Control of Thanksgiving Dinner as well as more highly technical titles such as Take Control of Mac OS X Server by Charles Edge. Reviewers have described Take Control titles as "thoughtful" and "loaded with useful tips and humor".

In 2017, TidBITS sold the Take Control Books imprint to alt concepts, a company run by the author Joe Kissell.
