= Asanté Technologies =

Defunct American networking company

Asanté Technologies, Inc.
- Type: Public
- Industry: Computer networking
- Founded: 1988; 38 years ago in Sunnyvale, California
- Founders: Jeff Lin; Wilson Wong
- Defunct: June 2005; 21 years ago
- Fate: Acquired by TechnoConcepts
- Headquarters: San Jose, California (1992–2005)
- Number of employees: 190 (1998, peak)
- Website: asante.com at the Wayback Machine (archived 2004-06-10)

Asanté Technologies, Inc., was an American computer networking equipment manufacturer active between 1988 and 2005. Founded in Sunnyvale, California, the company was for a time the market leader in networking products for Apple's line of Macintosh computers, providing hubs, switches, routers, and other equipment. The company also dabbled in the PC-compatible and enterprise networking markets. Following a period of declining market share and stagnation between 1998 and 2005, the company was acquired by rival TechnoConcepts in 2005.

== History ==
=== 1988–1991: Foundation ===
Asanté Technologies, Inc., was incorporated in 1988 from a small warehouse in Sunnyvale, California. The co-founders, Jeff Lin and Wilson Wong, had immigrated to California from Taiwan and Hong Kong in the 1960s, both graduating with electrical engineering degrees in the early 1970s. The two met in Mountain View, California, in 1983 at a Chinese-language Christian church and soon after found themselves working at the same computer networking equipment vendor in the city. Both shared a dream of starting their own networking companies and decided to quit their jobs to found Asanté. The name for the company derives from the French toast Santé (health), prefixed with an "A" to make the name appear higher in catalog listings for networking equipment manufacturers.

Lin and Wong set out the company to offer user-friendly products but had to first find a niche within the crowded market consumer networking peripherals. The two identified a gap in the market by honing in on Apple's line of Macintosh computers, which had lacked a robust range of Ethernet-based products that the IBM PC and compatibles were enjoying. With Ethernet connections, Mac-based local area networks (LANs) of the day could potentially reach bit rates than could be achieved with Apple's own LocalTalk. Rather than try to compete in the intensely crowded IBM PC compatible arena, the co-founders aimed for Asanté to be the market leader for Ethernet equipment for the Mac segment.

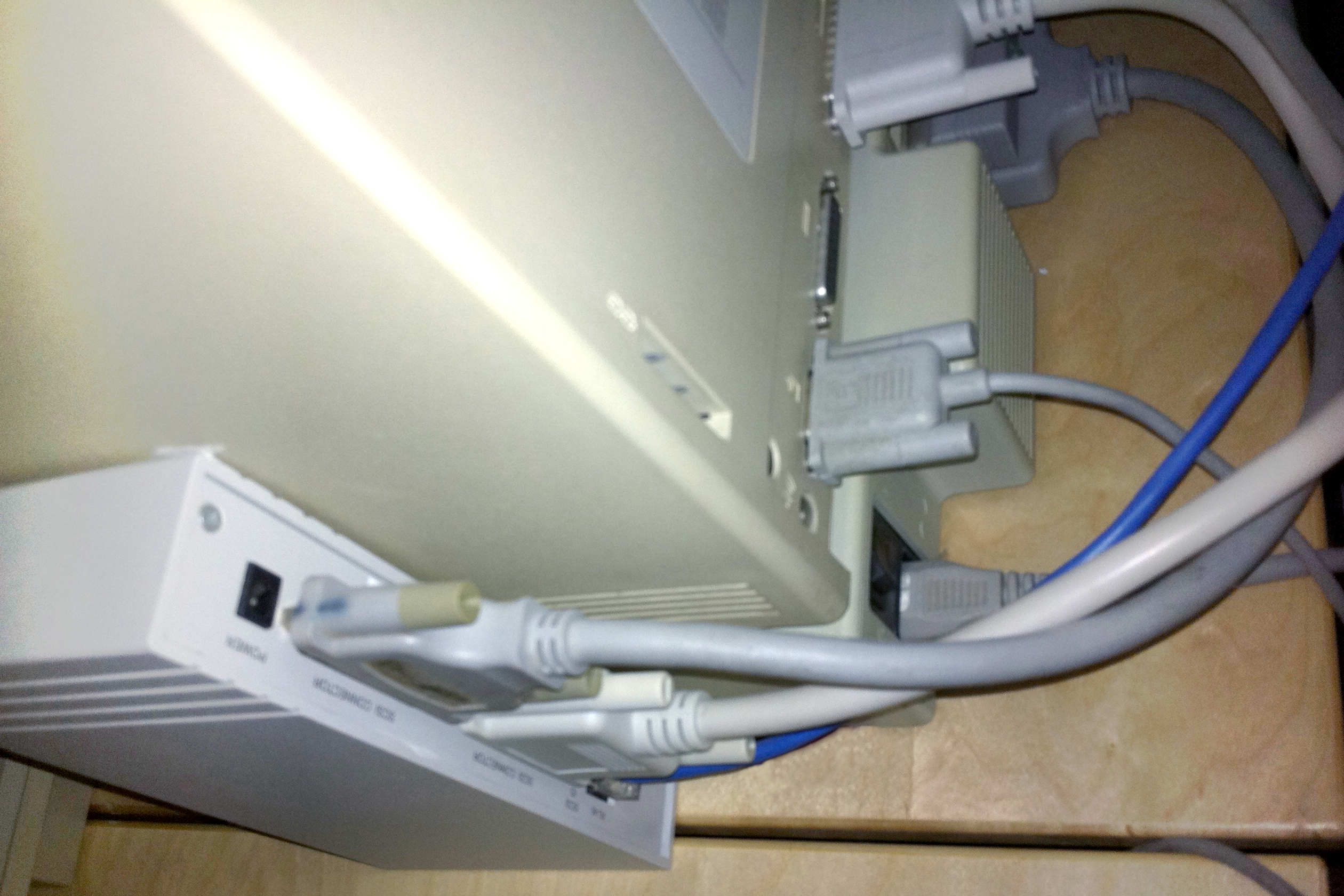
An Asante EN/SC Ethernet adapter connected to a Macintosh Plus

Asanté commenced operations as a contract manufacturer before marketing its own products. Shortly after its incorporation, the company found its first customer, who requested a rush delivery of an Ethernet networking product for final release before Christmas 1988. The company were able to deliver 2,000 units before the deadline; the success of the operation instilled confidence in the founders to carry on with their plans to formally launch the company. In April 1989, Asanté debuted their first commercial products, a series of Ethernet expansion boards for the Macintosh II. The company generated $94,000 in net revenues by the end of 1989. In 1990, during which the company employed only 11 people, Asanté released its first Ethernet hubs. During this early period, Asanté primarily targeted the educational sector, with universities accounting for 85 percent of their sales.

=== 1991–1995: Market leadership in the Macintosh segment ===
By 1991, Asanté had established itself as the leading global manufacturer of Mac networking adapters, holding a market share of 35 percent, with Apple themselves trailing behind at 24 percent. The company was helped along by offshore investments totaling roughly $2.4 million between 1991 and 1994, including $440,000 from Orient Semiconductor, the Taiwanese original equipment manufacturer (OEM) that Asanté had hired to manufacture its products.

Apple posed a challenge to Asanté's success when it introduced the high-end Quadra line of Macs, which came with Ethernet cards preinstalled, in October 1991. This significantly reduced demand for aftermarket Ethernet products among professional Mac buyers, who warmly received the Quadra line, compelling Asanté to diversify in order to keep their status as market leader. Late in the year, the company assembled a team of engineers to design and market Ethernet products for IBM PCs and compatibles to help secure the company's income. These PC-based Ethernet adapters debuted in 1992, Asanté meanwhile maintaining its Mac business as its primary concern. With the help of Ronald Volkmar, vice president of sales, between 1992 and 1994 the company maintained a roadmap of new products for the computer networking segment, including hubs, network management software, and Ethernet cards for the PC. These enhancements made Asanté one of the industry's most comprehensive providers of Ethernet adapter cards for both Macs and PCs. As a result of its growth, the company relocated from Sunnyvale to a much larger facility in San Jose, California in 1992. By the end of that year, the company's sales were $47.5 million, up 500 times from their 1989 revenues. Their market share in the Mac networking segment increased in turn to 46 percent that year.

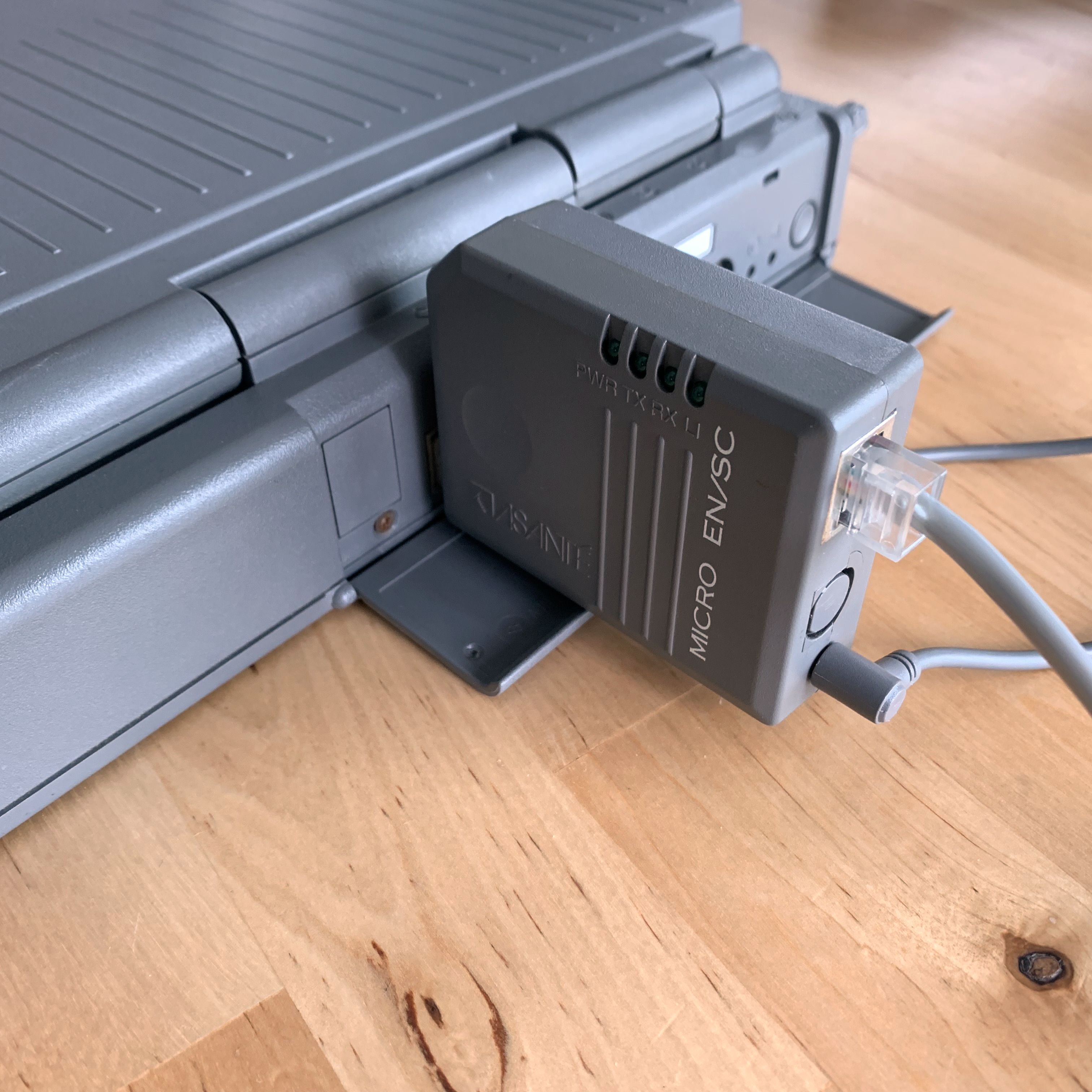
An Asante Micro EN/SC Ethernet adapter connected to the back of a PowerBook 145

In June 1993, Asanté brought in Ralph Dormitzer, a veteran executive of the Digital Equipment Corporation, to serve as president and CEO. Wong subsequently stepped down as CEO while remaining on the board of directors. Dormitzer's primary objective was to propel sales to over $100 million. Under new management, in December 1993, Asanté filed its initial public offering. By the end of the year, they had reported sales of $67.2 million and a net income of $2.1 million for the fiscal year. During this time, Asanté maintained its leadership position in the Mac Ethernet networking market and became the first company to offer support for newer Mac lineups that lacked native Ethernet support. This included the development of the smallest SCSI Ethernet adapter specifically designed for Apple's PowerBooks. Asanté likewise expanded its presence in the PC market and began setting its sights on entering the realm of enterprise networking systems, which involved networks with thousands of nodes or workstations. This put Asanté in direct competition with major players like Cisco Systems, SynOptics, and IBM. The company unveiled a 72-port smart network switch, which had the capability to monitor networks. Asanté's workforce meanwhile continued to grow, the company employing 133 workers by November 1993.

In March of 1994, Asanté introduced NetStacker, a network switch with a stackable chassis allowing for easier expansion and integration of networking equipment. Simultaneously, Asanté entered the market for remote LAN access with the launch of the NetConnect-Remote Access Server. Sales for 1994 continued to increase, with a 16-percent increase to $79.9 million and a surplus of $1 million. The company's payroll totaled 175 people by late 1994.

Asanté faced a lawsuit filed by SynOptics in February 1994, the latter alleging that former employees of theirs had incorporated SynOptics' software code into Asanté products, thus violating federal securities laws. To resolve the lawsuit, Asanté settled with SynOptics for $2.6 million. A significant portion of this settlement ($520,000) was covered by the company's insurance, reducing the impact of the settlement on Asanté's revenues. During this lawsuit, Dormitzer resigned as CEO and president in July 1994, with Lin named as his direct replacement.

=== 1995–2005: Setbacks and decline ===
In spite of its previous successes, Asanté experienced a decline in market share in 1995, as a result of increased competition. This led to a 24-percent drop in sales, down to $60.9 million, the company netting a loss that year of $3.7 million. The intensified competition stemmed from Apple's decision to incorporate Ethernet connections directly into the system boards of more of its Macs and PowerBooks. To address this challenge, Asanté streamlined its manufacturing operations, lowered prices on certain products to remain competitive in the market, and began offering lifetime warranties on its hubs and adapter cards, the latter helping to reassure customers and enhance the company's reputation. In order to rejuvenate its product lineup, Asanté introduced several new offerings in mid-1995. This included the AsantéFAST 100 Hub, which was the industry's first stackable managed hub for Fast Ethernet. Additionally, Asanté released the Ready Switch, marking the company's entry into the market of Fast Ethernet switches.

Asanté showed signs of recovery in 1996, achieving a 10-percent increase in its performance. This growth was primarily attributed to a surge in shipments of Fast Ethernet, new switched products, stackable hubs, and unmanaged hubs. The company also made efforts to expand its sales to OEMs and actively pursued contracts with larger OEMs. To help fortify its operations, Asanté shuffled its management team, appointing a new chief financial officer, a VP of sales, and a VP of engineering.

The company continued its progress in new product development and expanding into different market segments. This included entering the switched Ethernet market by introducing workgroup and segmentation switches. Additionally, Asanté provided networking solutions tailored to the publishing and prepress industries. The company released IntraSpection in 1996, a network management software suite that operated on an intranet-based system for Windows NT servers, as free shareware distributed from their website in October 1996. IntraSpection stood out as the industry's first software system designed for intranet-based network management. With IntraSpection, network managers could conduct device queries, triggering Simple Network Management Protocol–based polling of their networks. Additionally, the program allowed managers to access graphical maps that automatically updated, providing a visual representation of network changes as they occurred.

Despite recording strong sales of $67 million in 1996, Asanté faced challenges as its operating expenses grew at a faster rate than its revenue. As a result, the year concluded with a loss of $457,000, albeit with a 10-percent increase in revenues. Following the setback experienced in 1995, Asanté managed to regain its revenue position from the time of its IPO in 1993. The proportion of sales between the United States and overseas markets remained steady, with U.S. sales accounting for 23 percent of total sales in 1996 (compared to 28 percent in 1995 and 22 percent in 1994). In late 1996, Asanté expanded its international presence by establishing new sales offices in Canada, Japan, Taiwan, and the United Kingdom.

With a net income of $448,000 on revenues of $21.2 million by the second quarter of 1997, Asanté had improved from the same period last year, where they had lost $520,000 on revenues of $14.8 million. Sales data for the first half of fiscal 1997 were also up 24 percent from the same period last year. A new range of switches and Web browser–based network management tools were credited with this improvement. Although the company finished the year strong in 1997, with employment peaking at 190 workers, Asanté's market share in Ethernet products declined rapidly between 1998 and 1999. Despite generating $45.51 million in sales during that period, this represented 45.4-percent decline in sales year-to-year. In late 1998, Wong rejoined Asanté's management team, and in 1999 company attempted to find another niche in the Mac marketplace. Asanté pivoted to offering products that allowed legacy Apple products equipped with LocalTalk connectors (such as older PowerBooks and the Newton line of PDAs) to communicate with modern Ethernet networks. One such product, the AsantéTalk, was a miniature router containing one 10BASE-T Ethernet jack and a LocalTalk port. AsantéTalk was unveiled in May 1999.

Although stagnating heavily, Asanté managed to survive a few years into the next millennium. Wong re-assumed his position as CEO of Asanté in January 2002, replacing Lin. In March 2005, rival networking equipment manufacturer TechnoConcepts of San Jose announced that they would acquire Asanté in whole for $5 million in a stock swap. The merger was finalized in June 2005, Avanté continuing as a brand of TechnoConcepts.
