= Adam C. Engst =

American technology writer and publisher

Adam Engst
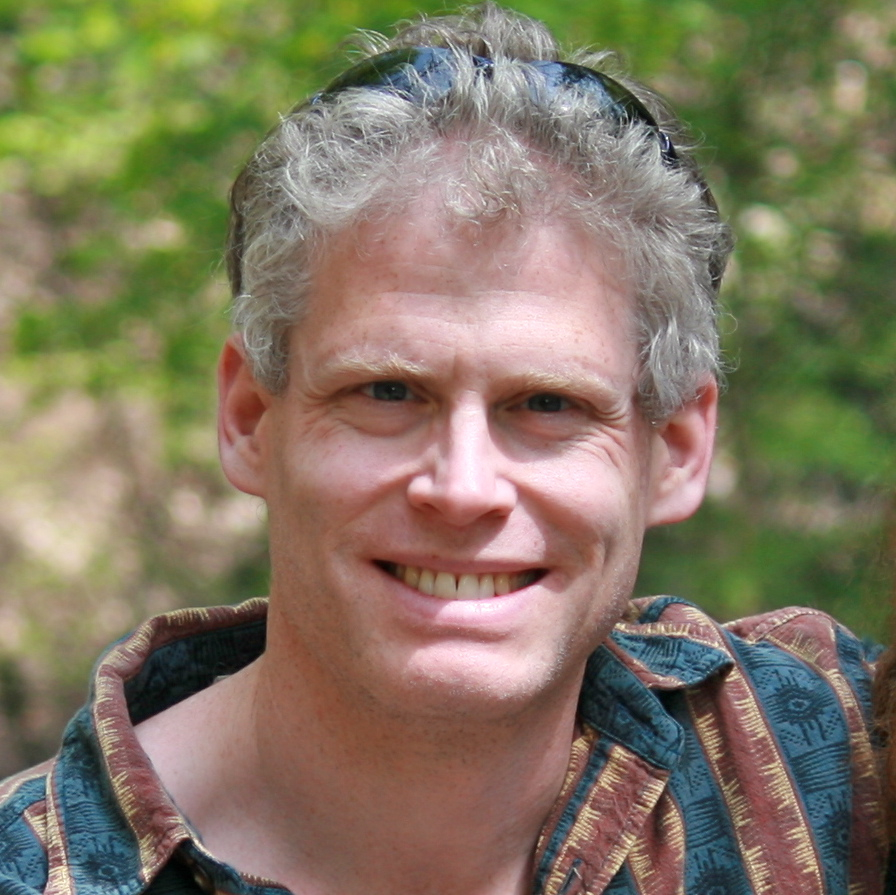
- Born: November 18, 1967 (age 57); Ithaca, New York, U.S.
- Occupation(s): author publisher of TidBITS and Take Control books
- Spouse: Tonya Engst

Adam C. Engst (born November 18, 1967) is a technology writer and publisher who resides in Ithaca, New York, United States where he was born and went to college at Cornell University.

Engst is the publisher of TidBITS, the oldest Internet-based email newsletter in the world, which is distributed weekly to tens of thousands of readers. He has also written many technical books, including the best-selling Internet Starter Kit series in the 1990s, books on Eudora and iPhoto, and magazine articles for MacUser, MacWEEK, and Macworld. Adam is the publisher of the Take Control book series; his wife, Tonya Engst, is the editor in chief of the series.

Engst is well known for his interest and support of the Macintosh community, repeatedly ranking in the top five in the annual MDJ Power 25 survey of the most influential people in the Macintosh ecosystem.

He is particularly proud of the fact that he is one of the few industry figures to have been turned into an action figure.

== Selected bibliography ==
- Internet Starter Kit for Macintosh (Various editions between 1993 and 1996)
- Internet Explorer's Kit for Macintosh (1994)
- Internet Starter Kit for Windows (1994–1995)
- Create Your Own Home Page (with Tonya Engst) (1995)
- Official AT&T WorldNet Web Discovery Guide (1997)
- Eudora for Windows & Macintosh: Visual QuickStart Guide (1997)
- Crossing Platforms: a Macintosh/Windows phrasebook (with David Pogue) (1999)
- Eudora 4.2 for Windows & Macintosh: Visual QuickStart Guide (1999)
- iPhoto 1.1 for Mac OS X: Visual QuickStart Guide (2002)
- iPhoto 2 for Mac OS X: Visual QuickStart Guide (2003)
- Wireless Networking Starter Kit: the practical guide to Wi-Fi networks for Windows and Macintosh (with Glenn Fleishman) (2003–2004)
- iPhoto 4 for Mac OS X: Visual QuickStart Guide (2004)
- iPhoto 5 for Mac OS X: Visual QuickStart Guide (2005)
- Take Control of Buying a Mac (2004) (electronic book)
- Take Control of Your Wi-Fi Security (with Glenn Fleishman) (2005) (electronic book)
