= Rene Ritchie =

Canadian technology journalist (born 1972)

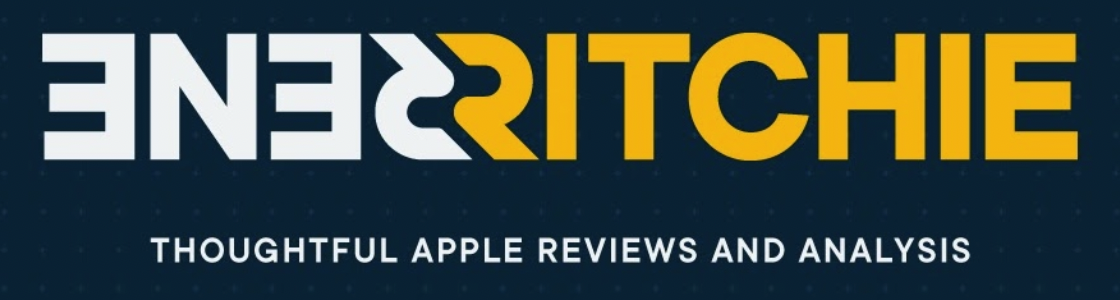
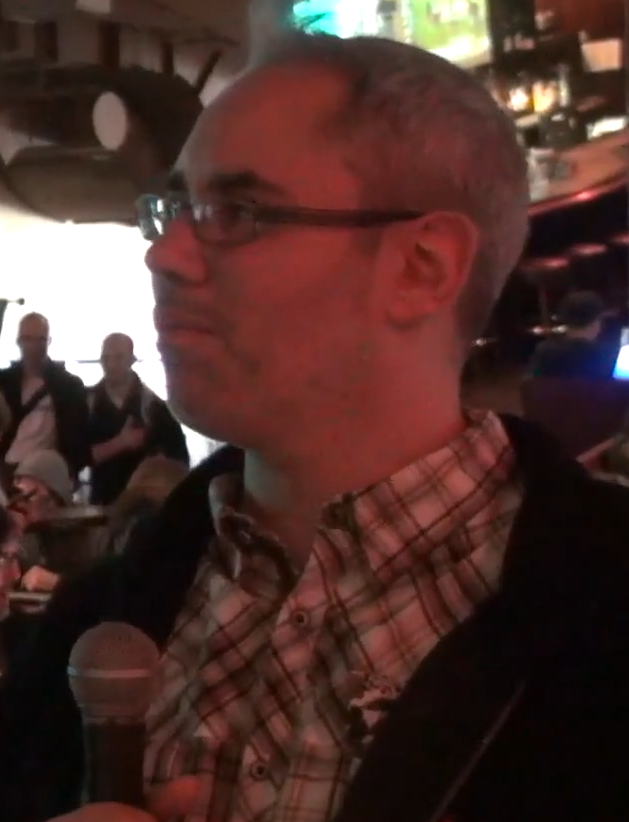
- Ritchie in 2014
- Born: 1972 (age 53–54); South Africa
- Occupations: YouTuber; tech blogger; author; podcaster

YouTube information
- Channel: Rene Ritchie
- Years active: 2020–present
- Genres: Apple; Technology; Consumer electronics
- Subscribers: 308,000
- Views: 55.6 million
- Last updated: August 4, 2026
- Website: reneritchie.net

Rene Ritchie (born 1972) is a Canadian independent blogger and YouTube content creator. Ritchie is known for his podcasts including Debug, Iterate, Vector, ZEN & TECH, Review, The TV Show, and as co-host of MacBreak Weekly on the TWiT Network. Rene was formerly Lead Analyst & Executive Editor of iMore. Ritchie was also the executive producer of Mobile Nations Broadcasting. He is a YouTuber and a founding member of Nebula. As of July 2022, Rene Ritchie is also YouTube's Creator Liaison.

He has been named by Business Insider one of the Top 100 most influential tech people in Twitter, one of the 15 most important Apple analysts and writers and one of the Top 25 Gadget Gurus.

== Early life ==
Ritchie studied art in college before dropping out to pursue a career in web design and marketing. He began his association with computers at the age of 6 with an Apple II Plus, and first began working on the internet in 1998 as a moderator on CompuServe. In 2010 Ritchie left a job in Enterprise software product marketing to work full-time for Mobile Nations, an online content and merchandise provider.

== Career ==
=== Blogging ===
In April 2008, Ritchie began writing for Phone Different, the iPhone channel of the Smartphone Experts Network. In 2009 he took over as managing editor of the site, which changed its name to The iPhone blog and then TiPb. In December 2011, the site rebranded again, to iMore and the network to Mobile Nations. Ritchie became EIC and Executive Producer, respectively. Ritchie has appeared on CNN International, MarketPlace, CBC News, and ABC15.

=== Podcasting ===
Ritchie is a frequent podcaster, hosting and co-hosting internet technology shows. He launched the iPhone Live podcast on November 12, 2008, which later changed its name to the iMore show. It had over 400 episodes as of July 2014. Ritchie hosts Vector, a tech news and analysis show, and co-hosts Debug, a show for developers; Iterate, a show for designers; ZEN & TECH, a show on connected lifestyles, Review, a show on movies and entertainment, and The TV Show. On October 16 of 2013, Ritchie joined the TWiT Network's MacBreak Weekly as a regular co-host.

=== YouTube ===
In July 2022, Ritchie was appointed by Google as the new YouTube Creator Liaison, succeeding Matt Koval.

=== Books ===
Ritchie has authored/co-authored five books:

- Complete Wing Chun (Charles E. Tuttle, 1998)
- Yuen Kay-San Wing Chun (Unique Publications, 1999)
- Legends of Wing Chun (Remnant Hunter, 2005)
- iPod touch Made Simple (Apress, 2011)
- iPhone 4S Made Simple (Apress, 2011)
