= MacWEEK =

San Francisco based trade journal

- MacWEEK cover dated 5 November 1998
- Type: trade journal
- Format: Paper and online magazine
- Owner(s): Michael Tchong, John Anderson, Glenn Patch, Dick Govatski, and Michael F. Billings and from 1988 Ziff-Davis
- Founded: 1987
- Ceased publication: 1999
- Language: English
- Price: free to qualified subscribers
- ISSN: 0892-8118
- Website: defunct

MacWEEK was a controlled-circulation weekly trade journal that focused on the Apple Macintosh. MacWEEK was based in San Francisco and founded by Michael F. Billings, Michael Tchong, Glenn Patch, and Dick Govatski. It featured a back-page rumor column penned by the pseudonymous Mac the Knife.

Founded in 1987, it was acquired by Ziff-Davis in 1988. In 1998, as part of a strategy change, the print publication was relaunched as eMediaWeekly, which caused a number of its existing sponsors to withhold their advertising. eMediaWeekly was published from August 24, 1998 to February 1, 1999. The online edition of MacWEEK continued for several years, originally under the editorial management of MacWEEK staff members and later under the management of former Macworld editors. It was later shuttered in favor of Mac Publishing's Macworld and MacCentral sites.

Rumors about Apple and its products were often published in MacWEEK which essentially became the source of record. Apple employees, following the example of executive Jean-Louis Gassée, at times referred to it as "MacLeak", yet some relied on it to distribute information they could not officially disclose, to draw internal corporate attention or funding to their projects, or to find out what was happening in their own company.
