= Microsoft Research =

Research division of Microsoft

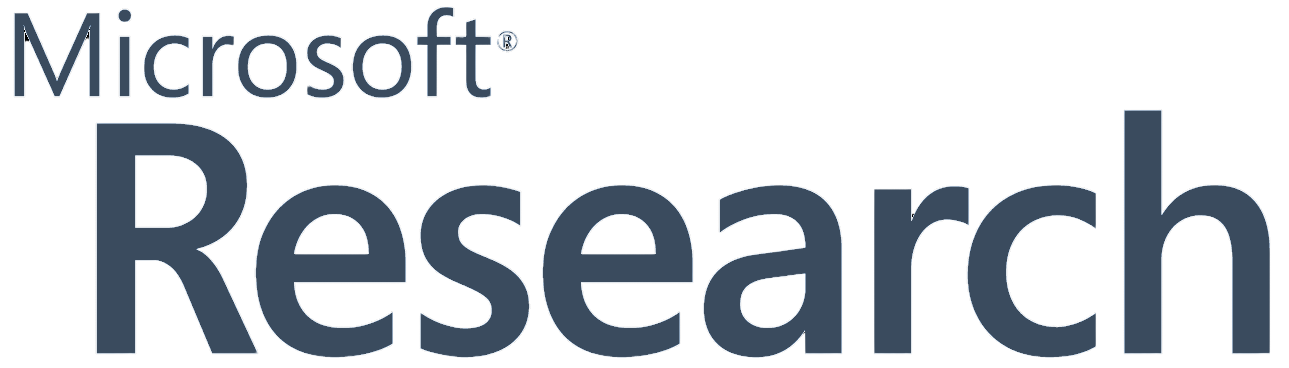
- Founded: 1991; 35 years ago
- Founders: Richard Rashid; Bill Gates; Nathan Myhrvold
- Type: Division
- Owner: Microsoft
- Key people: Lili Cheng (corporate vice president)
- Subsidiaries: Havok Group
- Employees: ~500 (in 2016)
- Website: microsoft.com/research

Microsoft Research (MSR) is the research subsidiary of Microsoft. It was created in 1991 by Richard Rashid, Bill Gates and Nathan Myhrvold with the intent to advance state-of-the-art computing and solve difficult world problems through technological innovation in collaboration with academic, government, and industry researchers. Microsoft Research employs more than 1,000 computer scientists, physicists, engineers, and mathematicians, including Turing Award winners, Fields Medal winners, MacArthur Fellows, and Dijkstra Prize winners.

Between 2010 and 2018, 154,000 AI patents were filed worldwide, with Microsoft having the largest percentage of those patents, at 20%. According to estimates in trade publications, Microsoft spent about $6 billion annually in research initiatives from 2002 to 2010 and has spent from $10–14 billion annually since 2010.

Microsoft Research has made significant advances in the field of AI which it has infused in its products including Kinect, Bing, HoloLens, Cortana, Microsoft Translator, LinkedIn, Havok and Dynamics.

The mission statement of MSR is:

1. Expand the state of the art in each of the areas in which we do research
2. Rapidly transfer innovative technologies into Microsoft products
3. Ensure that Microsoft products have a future

== Key people ==
Microsoft Research includes the core Microsoft Research labs and Microsoft Research AI, Microsoft Research NExT (for New Experiences and Technologies), and other incubation efforts all directed by corporate vice president Peter Lee.

== Research areas ==
Microsoft research is categorized into the following broad areas:

- Algorithms and theory of computation
- Communication and collaboration
- Computational linguistics
- Computational science
- Computer vision
- Computer systems and networking
- Data mining and management
- Economics and computational economics
- Education
- Gaming
- Computer graphics and multimedia
- Hardware and embedded systems
- Health and well-being
- Human–computer interaction
- AI for Social Good
- Machine learning and artificial intelligence
- Mobile computing
- Quantum computing
- Search, information retrieval, and knowledge management
- Security and privacy
- Social media
- Social sciences
- Software development
- Programming tools and languages
- Speech recognition, synthesis, and dialog systems
- Technologies for emerging markets
- Cryptocurrency

=== Fellowships ===
Microsoft Research sponsors several research fellowships for faculty and graduate students in the field of computer science. A non-exhaustive list of notable alumni of their fellowship programs include:

- Victor Bahl
- Anders Hejlsberg
- Don Box
- Jennifer Tour Chayes
- Dave Cutler
- David DeWitt
- Susan Dumais
- Marcus Fontoura
- Michael Freedman
- Erich Gamma
- Johannes Gehrke
- Jim Gray (computer scientist)
- Alex Kipman
- Butler Lampson
- Morgan Klaus Scheuerman
- Raghu Ramakrishnan
- Mark Russinovich
- John Shewchuk
- Burton Smith
- Jeffrey Snover
- Jaime Teevan
- Charles P. Thacker
- Eric Traut

== Research laboratories ==
Microsoft has research labs around the world including the following non-exhaustive list:

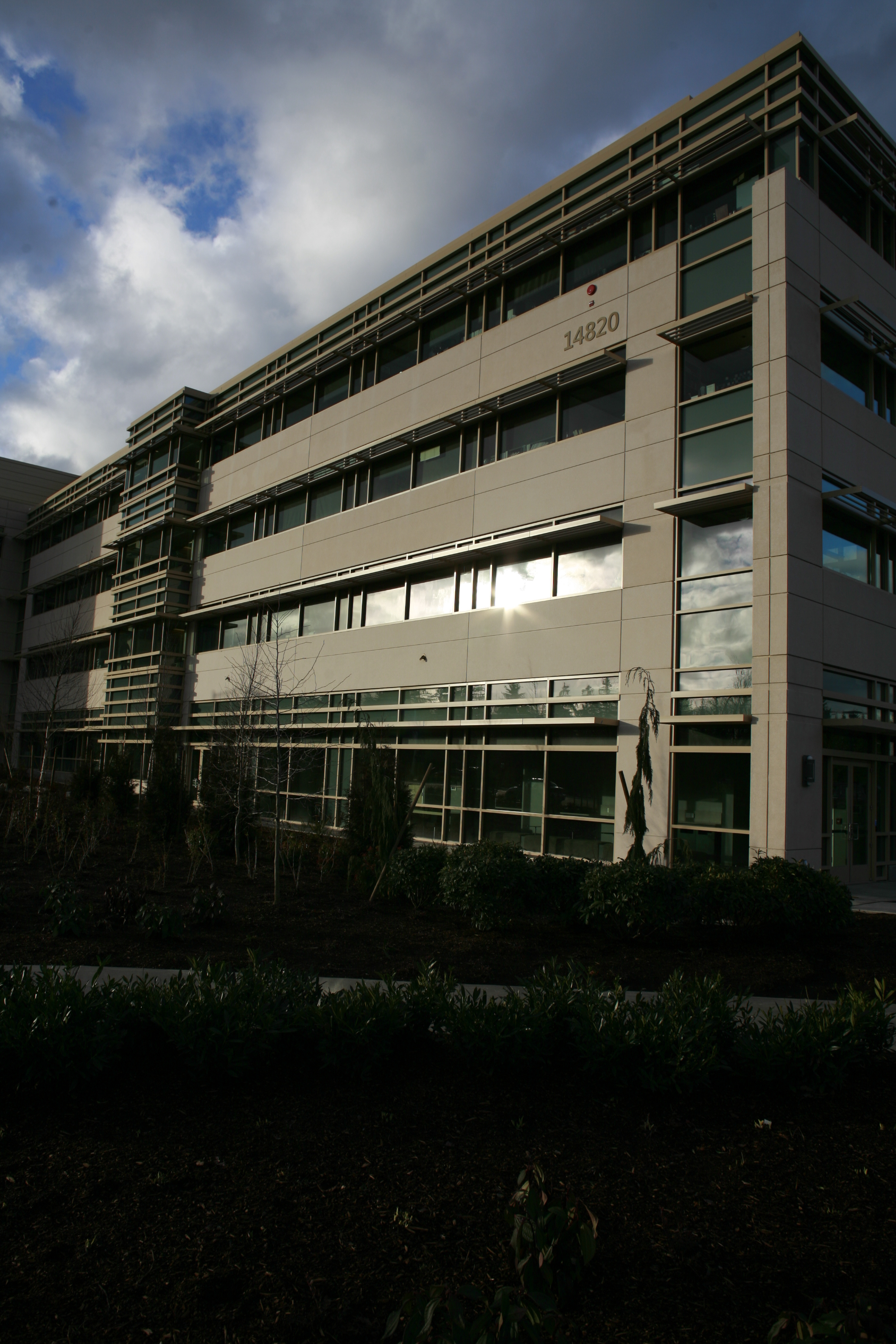
Microsoft Research Redmond

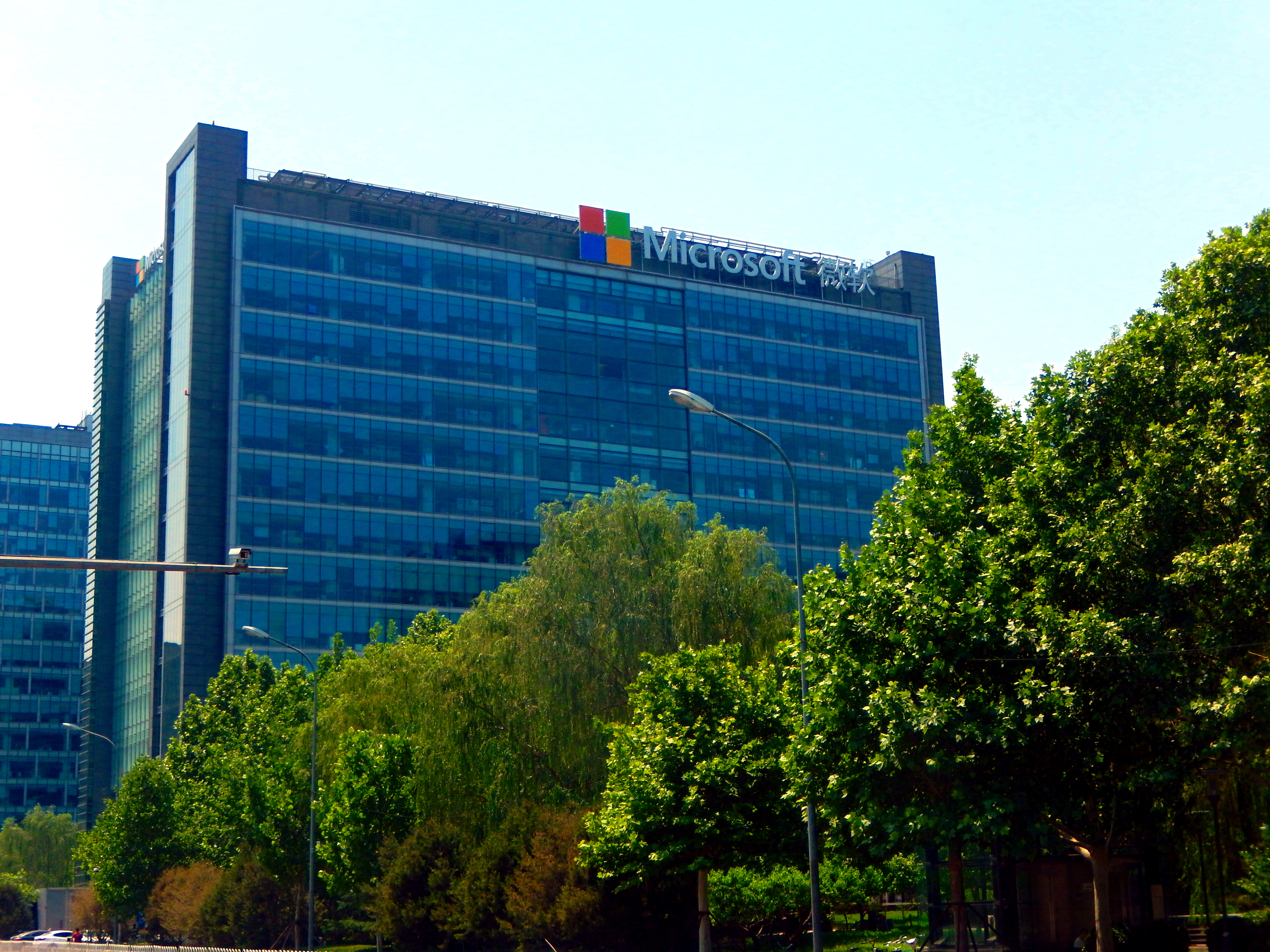
Microsoft Research Asia, Beijing

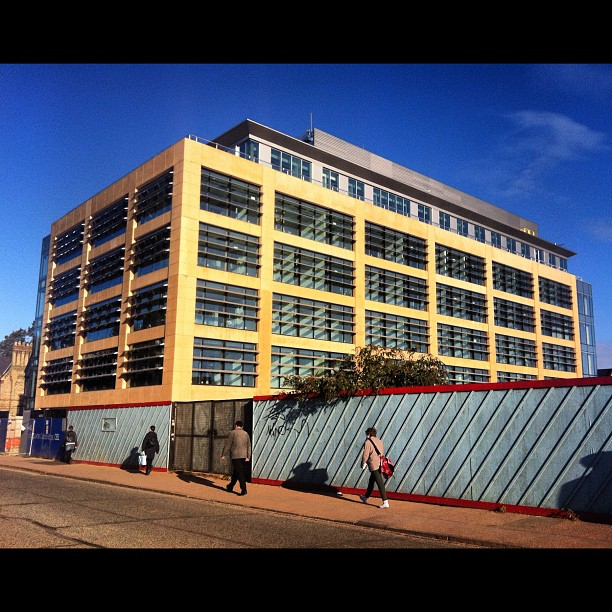
Microsoft Research Cambridge

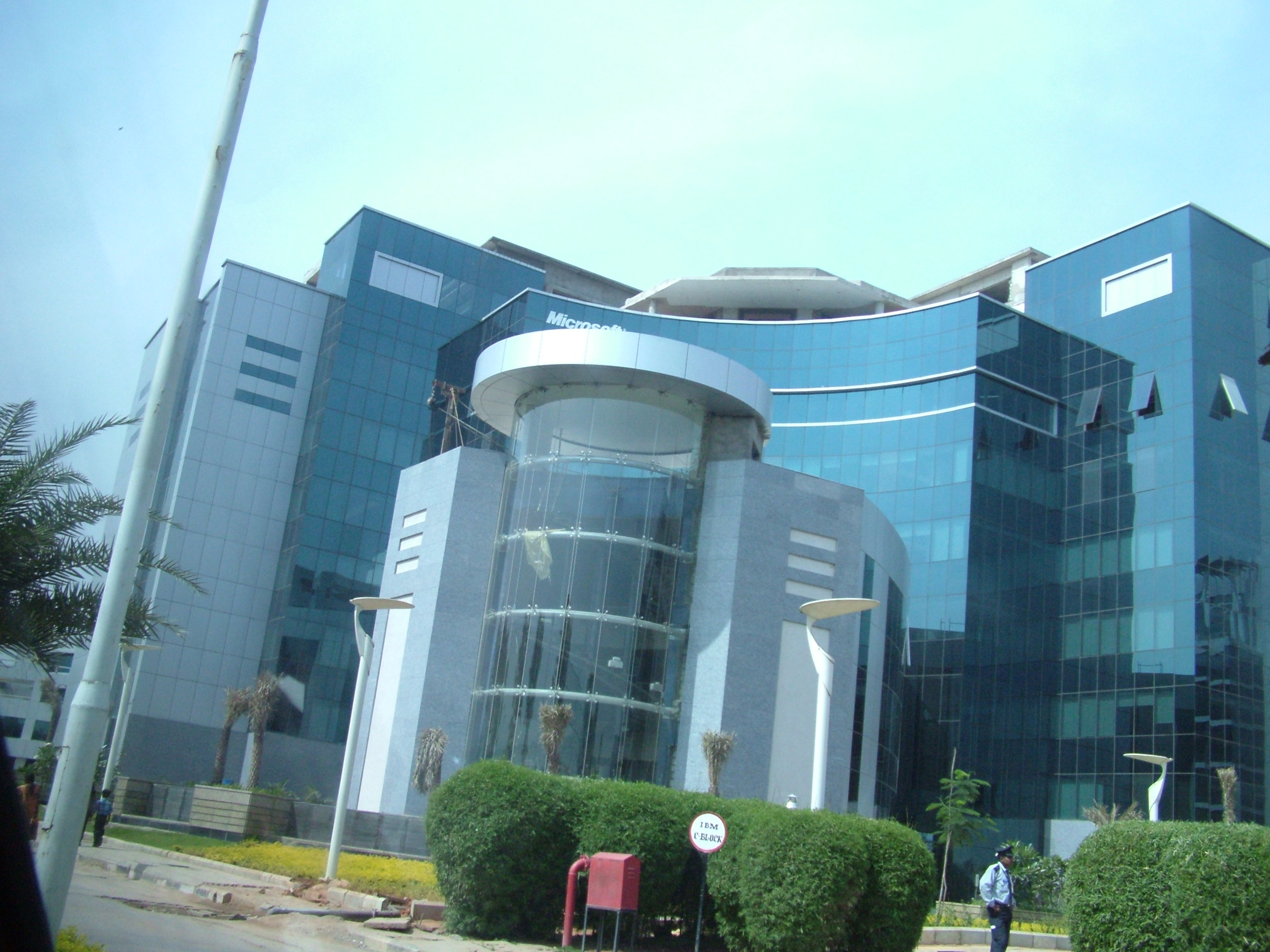
Microsoft Research Bangalore

- Microsoft Research Redmond was founded on the Microsoft Redmond campus in 1991. It has about 350 researchers and is headed by Donald Kossmann. The bulk of research on the Redmond, Washington campus focuses on areas such as theory, artificial intelligence, machine learning, systems and networking, security, privacy, human–computer interaction, and wearable technologies.
- Microsoft Research Cambridge was founded in the United Kingdom in 1997 by Roger Needham and is headed by Christopher Bishop. Antony Rowstron and Abigail Sellen are Deputy Directors. The lab conducts research on topics including machine learning, security and information retrieval, and maintains close ties to the University of Cambridge and the University of Cambridge Computer Laboratory.
- Microsoft Research Asia (MSRA or MSR Asia) was founded in Beijing in November 1998. It has expanded rapidly and now has more than 300 researchers and developers, along with approximately 300 visiting scientists and students (including its new satellite office in Shanghai). Its focus includes natural user interfaces, multimedia, data-intensive computing, search and online advertising, natural language processing, and computer science fundamentals. This lab forms part of the Microsoft Asia-Pacific Research and Development Group (ARD) R&D center, which also has campuses in Suzhou, Shenzhen, Tokyo, and Taipei.
- Microsoft Research India is sited in Bengaluru (Bangalore) and is headed by Sriram Rajamani.
- Microsoft Research Station Q, on the campus of the University of California, Santa Barbara, was founded in 2006. Its collaborators explore theoretical and experimental approaches to creating the quantum analog of the traditional bit—the qubit. The group is led by Michael Freedman. Its Quantum Architectures and Computation (QuARC) group is based in Redmond, while other Station Q satellite locations exist on the campuses of Delft University of Technology, Purdue University, University of Copenhagen, and University of Sydney.
- Microsoft Research New England was established in 2008 in Cambridge, Massachusetts adjacent to the MIT campus by Jennifer Chayes who also managed the New York and Montreal labs. The lab is now managed by Susan Dumais. The lab collaborates with the broader research community and pursues interdisciplinary research that brings together computer scientists and social scientists to develop future applications.
- Microsoft Research New York City was established on May 3, 2012. Susan Dumais serves as Managing Director of this location as well as the New England and Montreal labs. The lab collaborates with academia and other Microsoft Research labs in computational and behavioral social sciences, computational economics and prediction markets, machine learning, and information retrieval.
- Microsoft Research Montreal was established after the acquisition of Maluuba by Microsoft in 2017. Susan Dumais serves as Managing Director of this location as well as the New England and New York City labs. The lab collaborates with academia and other Microsoft Research labs in natural language processing (specifically machine reading comprehension), deep learning and reinforcement learning.
- Gray Systems Lab, in Madison, Wisconsin. Named after Jim Gray, GSL opened in 2008 to research database technologies.
- Microsoft Research Asia - Tokyo was established in November 2024 and is headed by Yasuyuki Matsushita. The lab focuses on embodied AI, societal AI, well-being and neuroscience, and industry innovation. It collaborates with Japanese academic and industry partners while maintaining close ties with other Microsoft Research Asia facilities. The lab operates various research programs including joint research initiatives and internship opportunities, contributing to AI innovation in the Asia-Pacific region.

=== Former research laboratories ===
- Microsoft Research Silicon Valley, located in Mountain View, California, was founded in August 2001 and closed in September 2014. Silicon Valley research focused on distributed computing and included security and privacy, protocols, fault-tolerance, large-scale systems, concurrency, computer architecture, internet search and services, and related theory.

== Collaborations ==
Microsoft Research invests in multi-year collaborative joint research with academic institutions at Barcelona Supercomputing Center, INRIA, Carnegie Mellon University, Massachusetts Institute of Technology, São Paulo Research Foundation (FAPESP), Analex Laboratories, the Microsoft Research Centre for Social NUI and others.

Since 2016, Microsoft has partnered with Toyota Connected to research technology for telematics, data analytics and network security services.

In October 2019, Microsoft partnered with Novartis to apply artificial intelligence to enhance personalized medicine research.

In 2023, Microsoft signed a multi-year deal to collaborate with Syneos Health in development of a platform to leverage machine learning for the optimization of clinical trials.

=== AI for Good ===
Microsoft's "AI for Good" initiative represents a significant commitment to leveraging artificial intelligence technology for social and environmental benefits. This initiative is part of a broader vision by Microsoft to utilize AI in addressing some of the world's most challenging issues, including those related to health, the environment, accessibility, cultural heritage, and humanitarian action. AI for Good includes topics like Microsoft AI for Earth.

== Quantum computing ==
Microsoft Azure Quantum has researched quantum information science since 2000 and is developing a topological quantum computer based on Majorana zero modes.

In 2000, physicist Alexei Kitaev at Microsoft Research proposed developing a topological quantum computer from Majorana quasiparticles.

In 2002, Michael Freedman, who led Microsoft's quantum research at Station Q in 2005, authored a paper with Kitaev demonstrating how a topological quantum computer could perform any computation that a conventional quantum computer could.

In 2005, 2006 and 2008, Sankar Das Sarma, Freedman and Chetan Nayak developed theoretical proposals for a topological qubit using the fractional quantum Hall effect and for topological quantum computing based on non-abelian anyons.

In 2015, Microsoft developed the theoretical framework of Majorana zero modes for information processing through braiding-based topological quantum computing.

In 2023, Microsoft research demonstrated the creation and control of Majorana quasiparticles for topological quantum computing.

In 2024, Microsoft created 4 logical qubits from 30 physical qubits, demonstrating reliable logical qubits by reducing the logical error rate by 800x compared to the physical error rate.

== See also ==
- Microsoft Award
- Microsoft Research Maps
