= AI for Good =

AI for Good may refer to:

- Good Old-Fashioned AI, a symbolic approach to Artificial Intelligence, as opposed to more modern stochastic approaches
- ITU AI for Good
- Microsoft AI for Good
  - Microsoft AI for Earth
- Google AI and Social Good
