= David Mendlen =

American technologist and executive

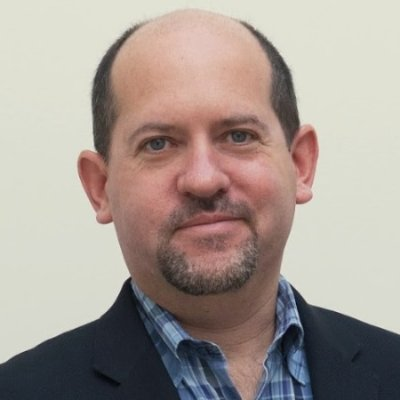
- Occupations: Technologist, Executive, Cloud & AI Strategist
- Known for: Microsoft Developer Experience, PwC Partner, The Decoded Show

David Mendlen is an American technologist, executive leader, and strategist known for his leadership roles at Microsoft and PwC, particularly in developer experience, cloud transformation, and artificial intelligence. He served as General Manager and Vice President at Microsoft, was a Partner at PwC leading their Microsoft practice, and currently engages in industry research and advisory while on executive sabbatical. Mendlen was the Executive Producer of the Decoded Show. He earlier served as the speechwriter for Microsoft co-founder Bill Gates and former CEO Steve Ballmer and, among other assignments, wrote Gates’ last speech and Ballmer’s first as CEO. Mendlen has keynoted conferences including COMDEX, VSLive and DEVintersection. Mendlen has contributed numerous articles including The Next Web.

== Career ==
=== Early career ===
Mendlen earned a Bachelor of Science degree in Management Information Systems from California State University, Chico. He joined Microsoft in 1998 as Lead Product Manager for Visual Studio.NET and later served as Senior Director of Windows Product Management. During this period, he was selected as a speechwriter for Microsoft co-founders Bill Gates and Steve Ballmer, writing Gates’ final keynote address and Ballmer’s first public speech as CEO.

=== Microsoft (1998–2020) ===
During his multi-decade tenure at Microsoft, Mendlen held several high-level leadership roles. From 2014 to 2020, Mendlen served as General Manager and Vice President at Microsoft. He led the Developer Experience (DX) and founded the Commercial Software Engineering (CSE) organization, responsible for engaging with developers globally and accelerating digital transformation across Fortune 500 enterprises via Microsoft Azure.{{

=== PwC (2021–2024) ===
From January 2021 to April 2024, Mendlen was a Partner at PwC, where he led the firm's Microsoft practice. He specialized in enterprise adoption of generative AI, GitHub Copilot, and other emerging technologies. He advised C-level executives on large-scale digital transformation strategies involving security, compliance, and cloud modernization.

=== Decoded Show ===
In 2016, Mendlen introduced as Executive Producer the Decoded Show, with Microsoft Technical Fellow John Shewchuk as Host. The show offers regular insight into developer focused topics with interesting people from the industry. The Decoded Show has hosted guests such as, actor Kevin Hart.

== Personal life ==
Mendlen resides in Bellevue, Washington. He is active in philanthropy and nonprofit engagement, having served as a startup accelerator judge and board member for innovation-driven organizations.

== See also ==
- Microsoft Azure
- GitHub Copilot
- Developer Experience
