= Channy Yun =

South Korean technologist (born 1973)

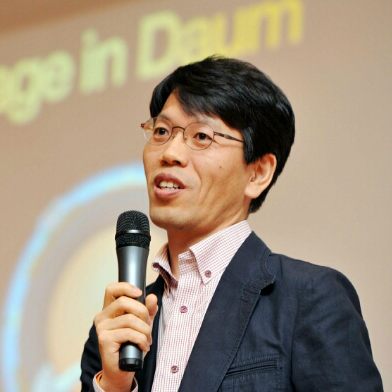
- Yun in 2013
- Born: January 19, 1973; South Korea
- Employer: Amazon Web Services
- Known for: Cloud computing, Open-source software, HTML5, Mozilla

Korean name
- Hangul: 윤석찬
- Hanja: 尹錫璨
- RR: Yun Seokchan
- MR: Yun Sŏkch'an
- Website: channy.creation.net

Seokchan "Channy" Yun (윤석찬; born January 19, 1973) is a South Korean technologist. He promotes Web standards for Web compatibility issues in South Korea, with a particular focus on encouraging adoption of Firefox. He was an invited expert in W3C and contributed Web standards such as HTML5 and Web cryptography API. He also founded WebStandards Korea as a member of the International Liaison Group of Web Standards Project, which is an active advocate for Web standards and best practices either in their country of origin or domicile.

Yun is known as one of the powerful voices of open-source software on Twitter, according to Chris Preimesberger of eWeek, who described him as "one of South Korea's top tech writers". Yun is a well-known technical writer that maintains his own blog, having written over 50 columns on ZDNet Korea, and was Asian editorial adviser of Lift Conference Asia. He was one of the founders of BarCamp Seoul and WebAppsCon.

He formerly held the position of CTO of Nine4u, South Korea's first Korean online music & radio service, before joining Daum Communications, the operator of the Daum web portal. At Daum, he was a API evangelist, supporting third-party developers using Daum's Open API and started the first Korean Open-source software class as an adjunct professor, Dept. of Computer Engineering, at Jeju National University.

He researched big data analysis with semantic web and medical informatics at Seoul National University and focused on the Open-source software strategy of Big Data at Daum.

He now works for Amazon Web Services as a technical evangelist in South Korea and is an author of the AWS News Blog, writing launch posts for new AWS services.

He is also known as the first Korean YouTube video uploader on August 9, 2005.
