= Channy =

Channy is a given name. People with this name include:

- Cheam Channy (born 1962), Cambodian male politician
- Channy Yun (born 1973), South Korean male technologist
- Chantel Woodhead (born 1974), English female footballer
- Channy Leaneagh, American female musician
