= Web compatibility issues in South Korea =

Browser compatibility issues

Many South Korean websites have web compatibility issues, due to the non-standard technology that they use. Often this technology works only with Microsoft's Internet Explorer (IE), some smartphones (iPhone, Android, etc.), and tablets. Following the revision of the Electronic Signatures Act in January 2021, Microsoft's phased outage policy for IE and the increased use of other web browsers that have solved this compatibility problem in a more standard way.

== Problem ==
Government offices and banks have been criticized for forcing the usage of Internet Explorer’s ActiveX. For example, Civil Service 24, a comprehensive civil service portal site provided by the Korean government, requires ActiveX. Some government sites require lower security levels for web browsers. South Korea's compatibility problem is what Former President Park Geun-Hye pointed out as a concern during the regulatory reform debate.

In particular, customers are directed to international direct-purchase sites to avoid downloading ActiveX or going through an additional 10 steps to complete a transaction. This is because, unlike South Korea, international websites allow customers to pay with one or two clicks.

South Korea is the only country in the world that requires Internet Explorer and requires that online purchases use ActiveX and public certificates. This disrupts domestic shopping malls’ websites. These issues led the country to be criticized as a "message disease" that hinders online shopping.

== Phenomenon ==
Example of a misaligned layout:

Attempting to use Internet Explorer only sites with other web browsers produces:

- Layout destruction - page layout is disorganized or certain parts are not displayed.
- Click Inactive - buttons do not respond.
- Unable to log in: Log in fails.
- IE-only sites display a notification message that the site is only available on Internet Explorer.

== Cause ==
=== E-commerce encryption technology ===
Due to restrictions on the export of cryptography from the United States, standard 128-bit SSL encryption was unavailable in Korea. Web browsers were only available to Koreans with weakened 40-bit encryption. In the late 1990s, the Korea Internet & Security Agency developed its own 128-bit symmetric block cipher named SEED and used ActiveX to mount it in web browsers. This soon became a domestic standard, and the country's Financial Supervisory Service used the technology as a security screening standard. ActiveX spread rapidly in Korea. In 2000, export restrictions were lifted, allowing the use of full-strength SSL anywhere in the world. Most web browsers and national e-commerce systems adopted this technology, while Korea continued to use SEED and ActiveX.

=== Increased Internet Explorer utilization ===
In the early 2000s, Netscape, IE's only competitor, failed, and Microsoft's "insert operation" led to the virtual success of the Windows operating system. In Korea, the number of people buying PCs and the Internet at home increased sharply, and Internet Explorer gained share. Most websites depend on Internet Explorer, and ActiveX began to be abused because many web programmers were mass-produced through information service education in Korea around 2000 when ActiveX was widely taught.

=== Vicious circle ===
While Internet Explorer's global market share peaked in 2004, Firefox was released by Netscape. As rumors spread through blogs and media that Firefox was superior to Internet Explorer, Firefox gained share. This raised interest in browsers such as Safari, Opera, and Chrome. Firefox and Google Chrome increased to around 25%, respectively, while Internet Explorer fell to 40%, and continued to fall.

In South Korea, these browsers also gained share, but many sites continued to support only Internet Explorer. As of August 2011, South Korea's Internet Explorer market share was over 90%.

== Makeshift ==
=== User Makeshift User Temporary ===
Windows Firefox can use Internet Explorer's engine by installing "IETAB" (Finding the Past). However, this approach was unstable.

Non-Windows operating systems, such as Linux and OS X, have a method of installing Windows on virtual machines such as VirtualBox and then running Internet Explorer in guest windows. IEs4Linux on the Wine is another workaround, although this was also unstable.

=== E-Government ===
On April 29, 2008, the Ministry of Public Administration and Security of the Republic of Korea finalized and announced the enactment of the "E-Government Web Standards Compliance Guidelines" that define minimum protocols that the government should reflect when establishing e-Government systems. To make this a more effective guideline, the "E-government Web Compatibility Guidelines" were enacted and announced as of August 19, 2009, adopting the principle of ensuring compatibility with at least three browsers, absent technical constraints.

== Improvement movement ==
As of 2010, various solutions have been devised, but the abolition of the public certificate, the core of the problem, is still far from being implemented. In December 2017, the South Korean government decided to abolish ActiveX from the year-end tax settlement, but the exe file must still be installed.

=== Free Bank Movement ===
The Free Bank movement, launched by Kwak Dong-soo in 2003, carried out civic action promising to open 10 billion won in accounts at banks that provided Internet banking services for underprivileged non-Windows and non-IE users. 2200 people donated 16 billion won, but no bank participated in the financial sector regulation and the number of users was small at that time. However, after Shinhan Bank developed and provided Internet banking solutions for Macintosh, the Free Bank movement ended.

=== Web Standard Project ===
Mozilla Korea Community established the Web Standard Forum in 2004 and continued various discussions and promotional activities to improve it. The anti-ActiveX campaign was led by Channy Yun, and the web standard guide was provided free of charge. In August 2005, the focus was mainly on browser compatibility with web page layouts, including web standards centered on Korean Web standard technology communities, recommending the elimination of DOM errors, and replacing existing table layouts with CSS.

=== Open Web ===
The Open Web was established in 2006 by Professor Kim Ki Chang of Korea University School of Law, calling for improvements to the web standards and support for users who do not use Microsoft products. The Financial Supervisory Commission said this is due to security issues, but people argued that ActiveX is outdated given general-purpose encryption technologies such as SSL. The KCC recommended the removal of ActiveX.

=== IE6 Exclusion Movement ===
Internet Explorer 6 (IE6) was released in 2001. It had a 20% share in the world market and 50% in South Korea as of 2009. As a result, many companies create websites compatible with IE6. To reduce the negative impact of this limitation, many parts of the world are campaigning to remove Internet Explorer 6, through movements like IE6 No More, IE6 Must Die, and IE6 Countdown. In South Korea, portals display a message at the top of the screen that recommends upgrading to IE7 and IE8.

Due to this IE6 Exclusion campaign, IE6's market share fell to less than 2% in South Korea as of January 2014 and to less than 5% in the global market along with the end of Windows XP support in April 2014, and the adoption of smartphones.

=== Improvements in some websites ===
Internet bookstore Aladdin reorganized its website to support other browsers. The National Tax Service reorganized its website to meet the web standard in January 2010, and the Ministry of Culture, Sports and Tourism strengthened web accessibility to obtain web accessibility quality marks. Yuhan-Kimberly won the web accessibility award by expanding accessibility, and The Ministry of Public Administration and Security conducted a survey of 1,000 companies and institutions on web standards. On July 9, 2010, Woori Bank launched its open banking service, which implements the Internet banking system with general-purpose technologies available on all platforms; this slowly inspired other companies to enlarge compatibility. Kookmin Bank followed Woori Bank in January 2011, and Industrial Bank of Korea released IBK Open Web Banking in February 2011.

=== Smartphones ===
In March 2010, the Ministry of Public Administration and Security abolished the regulation that only public certificates are recognized as security programs during financial transactions. This allows banking on smartphones that do not run ActiveX. However, the Financial Services Commission said it had not considered revising the Enforcement Decree of the Electronic Financial Transactions Act.

=== Korea Communications Commission ===
In March 2011, the Korea Communications Commission (KCC) announced a plan to improve the Internet usage environment, focusing on alternative technologies, diversification of web browser usage, and upgrading the web environment.

The Mozilla Korea Community led by Channy Yun initially proposed the web standards-based HTML5 encryption and certificate functionality and started the W3C Web Cryptography API specification.

In January 2012, KCC announced that plans to investigate and announce the status of ActiveX on a quarterly basis for 100 major websites and open them to web developers or web service providers. In April the Ministry of Public Administration and Security (PAS) and KCC reported that 168 sites, or 84% of the 200 major public-private sites in South Korea, were using ActiveX technology. The private sector used ActiveX the most in payment and certification (41.1%), while administrative agencies use ActiveX the most in security (40%).

In July 2012, PAS and KCC reported that supported three or more types of web browsers, using ActiveX only in Internet Explorer and alternative technologies in other web browsers. As a result, 73% of the top 100 websites of government administrative agencies provide alternative technologies, that are available in more than three web browsers.

In July 2012 KCC announced a plan to promote the spread of HTML5 standards.

As of 2018, W3C's Web Cryptography API has been used as the basis for security technologies such as public certificates based on HTML5 in e-government services and banking. This ensures diversity in operating systems and web browsers.
