= Open-source software advocacy =

Open-source software advocacy is the practice of attempting to increase the awareness and improve the perception of open-source software. In some cases, this may be in opposition to proprietary software or intellectual property concepts (e.g. patents and copyrights as a whole).

Leading open-source advocates include Brian Behlendorf, Tim O'Reilly, Eric Raymond, Linus Torvalds, Mitch Kapor, Jim Jagielski and Paul Vixie. Others that advocate the related free software movement include Richard Stallman, Alan Cox, Jimmy Wales and Eben Moglen. Bruce Perens is a prominent figure who works to promote both terms.

There are even broadcast and podcast radio shows whose sole subject is open source advocacy. Gutsy Geeks and Open Source (radio show) are but two examples.

== See also ==
- FOSDEM
- Technical evangelist
- Category Open Source Advocates
