= Truemors =

- Website type: User-created social media
- Headquarters: Santa Monica, California, U.S.
- Owner: Guy Kawasaki
- Creator: Guy Kawasaki
- Website: https://truemors.com
- Commercial: Yes
- Registration: Required, minimal

Truemors, is a user-created rumor reporting site founded by noted author and venture capitalist Guy Kawasaki. The service launched in the middle of May 2007 to mixed reviews.

While its home page resembles many list-style sites such as Digg and Reddit, Truemors focuses on "true rumors" in a time-sensitive setting.

Truemors was sold to NowPublic in 2008.

== Launch ==
The service launched with some buzz, as Kawasaki has been a well-regarded author about entrepreneurship with not many startups under his belt. Of particular note, Michael Arrington of TechCrunch stated in a May 15 review, "I like the idea of truemors but they are launching very broadly. Digg became popular based on focusing on a tech niche to start (and it may be stuck there as it tries to expand)."

Writing two days later, Seth Godin said on his blog, "I disliked this project from the very first moment I saw the beta."

Brian Lash, founder of blog-to-audio service Ch4tter, expressed support for the project on his blog. Others expressed their support for Kawasaki's efforts by posting comments to Kawasaki's blog. In a response on his blog, he wrote "Thanks for the kind words about Truemors! To put it mildly, there has been very few positive things said about it. But every company has to start somewhere, right?"

Whether it was good or bad press, a spike in traffic earned the site a top-10,000 Alexa ranking. Truemors has been criticized - both by the blogosphere and on its own pages - for slow load times and "chit-chat" posts that recall Twitter.

Development for the site was unusual. Kawasaki was proud to say it only cost US $12,107.09 because all software development was out-sourced to a South Dakota firm, Electric Pulp.
