= Evangelism marketing =

Form of word-of-mouth marketing

Evangelism marketing is an advanced form of word-of-mouth marketing in which companies develop customers who believe so strongly in a particular product or service that they freely try to convince others to buy and use it. The customers become voluntary advocates, actively spreading the word on behalf of the company.

Evangelism marketing is sometimes confused with affiliate marketing. However, while affiliate programs provide incentives in the form of money or products, evangelist customers spread their recommendations and recruit new customers out of pure belief, not for the receipt of goods or money. Rather, the goal of the customer evangelist is simply to provide benefit to other individuals.

As they act independently, evangelist customers often become key influencers. The fact that evangelists are not paid or associated with any company makes their beliefs perceived by others as credible and trustworthy.

Evangelism comes from the three words of 'bringing good news', and the marketing term draws from the religious sense, as consumers are driven by their beliefs in a product or service, which they preach in an attempt to convert others.

== History ==
Some people believe Guy Kawasaki, the former chief evangelist of Apple Computer, to be the father of evangelism marketing. In his books The Art of the Start and How to Drive Your Competition Crazy, Kawasaki states that the driving force behind evangelism marketing is the fact that individuals simply want to make the world a better place. Evangelist customers spread their recommendations and recruit new customers out of pure belief, not for goods or money.

== Types ==
- Evangelism marketing applies to any kind of product.
- Technology evangelism is the evangelism marketing of a tool.
- Platform evangelism is the evangelism marketing of the opportunity to create complementary goods for a multi-sided platform, which also involves non-marketing functions such as regulation of the platform's commercial ecosystem to maximize network effects.

== Customer communities ==
A strong avenue for evangelists is in the form of customer communities, which bring together groups of users of a product or service to share information and discuss common issues. Some companies assist with such events, for example, General Motors' Saturn division in Tennessee organized an annual summer picnic for thousands of customers. Another example is the Harley Owners Groups (HOGS), organized by Harley Davidson, which associates bikers locally and globally through quarterly and annual meetings held all over the world. Starbucks, the coffee company, started an online customer community in 2008 called My Starbucks Idea, designed to collect suggestions for products or services and feedback from customers. During the first year of the program, My Starbucks Idea generated 70,000 ideas through the site and approximately 50 changes based on customer suggestions were implemented.

== See also ==
- Brand loyalty
- Buzz marketing
- Crowdsourcing
- Diffusion of innovations
- Cult of Mac
