= Guy Kawasaki =

American businessman and author (born 1954)

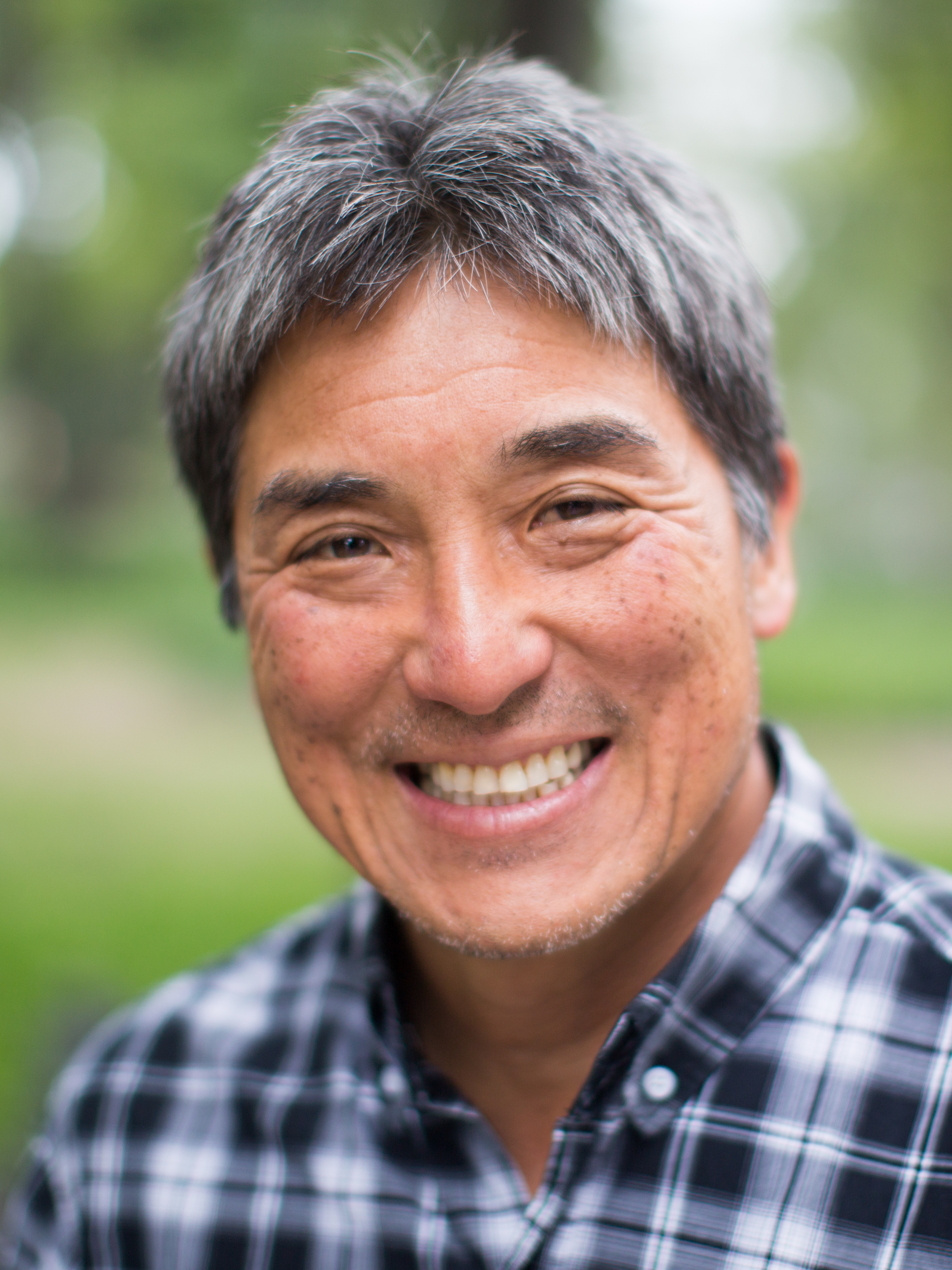
- July 2015 at Wikimania
- Born: Guy Takeo Kawasaki; August 30, 1954 (age 72); Honolulu, Hawaii Territory
- Education: Stanford University (BA); University of California, Los Angeles (MBA)
- Occupations: Author; Chief Evangelist, Canva; Former Apple Fellow
- Children: 4
- Website: Official website

Guy Takeo Kawasaki (born August 30, 1954) is an American marketing specialist, author, and venture capitalist in Silicon Valley. He was one of the Apple employees originally responsible for marketing their Macintosh computer line in 1984. He popularized the word evangelist in marketing the Macintosh as an "Apple evangelist" and the concepts of evangelism marketing and technology evangelism/platform evangelism in general.

From March 2015 until December 2016, Kawasaki sat on the board of trustees of the Wikimedia Foundation, the non-profit operating entity of Wikipedia.

Kawasaki has also written fifteen books, including The Macintosh Way (1990), The Art of the Start (2004), and Wise Guy: Lessons from a Life (2019).

== Early life and education ==
Guy Kawasaki was born in Honolulu, Hawaii, to Duke Takeshi Kawasaki (d. 2015) and Aiko Kawasaki. His family lived in an area outside Honolulu called Kalihi Valley. His father, Duke, once served as a fireman, real estate broker, state senator, and government official while his mother was a housewife. He attended ʻIolani School and graduated in 1972.

Kawasaki graduated from Stanford University in 1976 with a Bachelor of Arts degree in psychology. He then attended law school at UC Davis, but quit after about a week of classes when he realized that he disliked law school. In 1977, he enrolled in the UCLA Anderson School of Management, where he earned an MBA degree. While there, Kawasaki also worked at a jewelry company, Nova Stylings. Kawasaki observed, "The jewelry business is a very, very tough business, tougher than the computer business... I learned a very valuable lesson: how to sell."

== Career ==
External videos
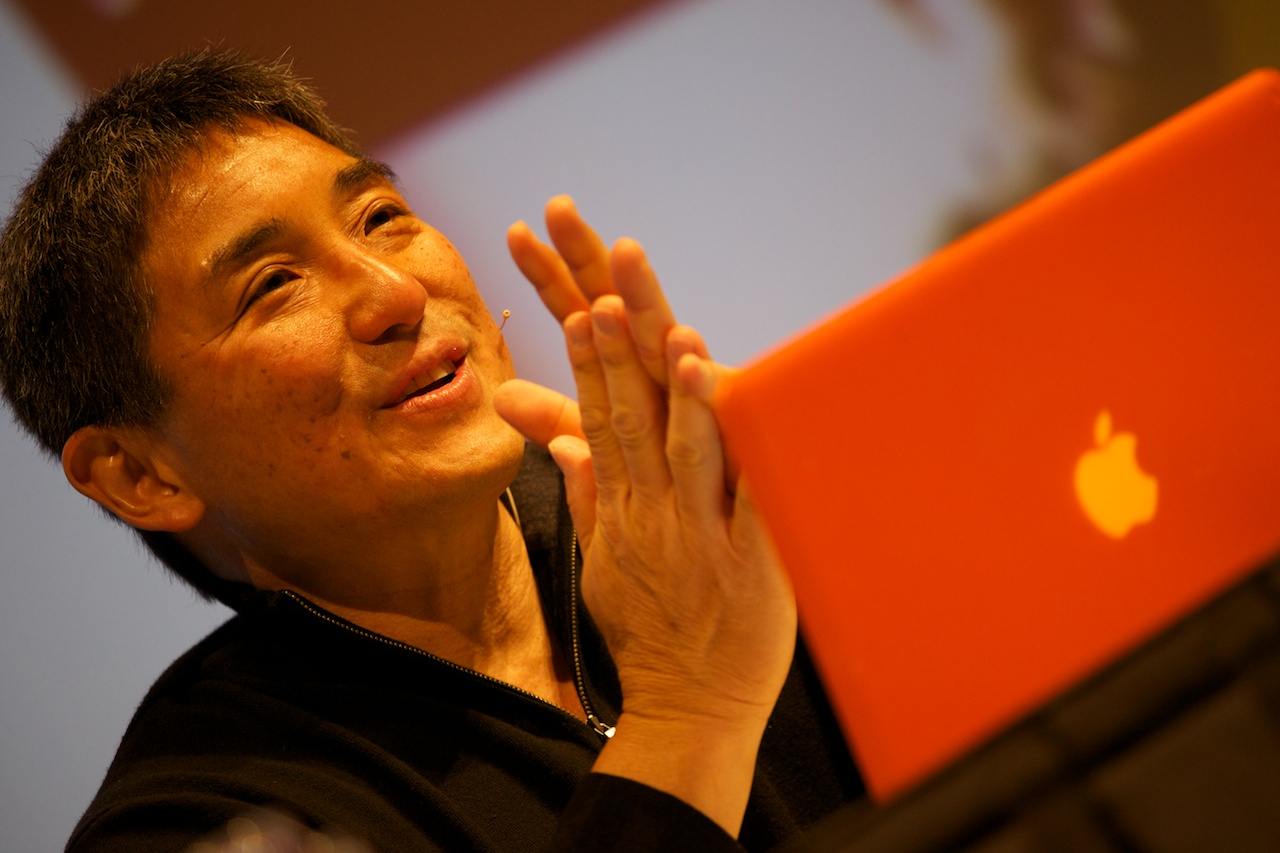
- The art of innovation Guy Kawasaki, TEDxBerkeley, TEDx, 21:15, February 22, 2014
- Ten Words You Seldom Hear in Social Media, Social Data Week, September 16, 2013, 29:21

In 1983, Kawasaki got a job at Apple through his Stanford roommate, Mike Boich. He was the chief Apple evangelist for four years. In a 2006 podcast interview on the online site Venture Voice, Kawasaki said, "What got me to leave is basically I started listening to my own hype, and I wanted to start a software company and really make big bucks." In 1987 he was hired to lead ACIUS, the U.S. subsidiary of France-based ACI, which published an Apple database software system called 4th Dimension.

Kawasaki left ACIUS in 1989 to further his writing and speaking career. In the early 1990s he wrote columns that were featured in Forbes and MacUser magazines. He also founded another company, Fog City Software, which created Emailer, an email client that sold to Claris. A collection of namesake software utilities called Guy's Utilities for Macintosh (GUM), was published by After Hours Software in the early 1990s. An edition of GUM for PowerBook systems was acquired by Gordon Eubanks and was subsequently remarketed by Symantec as The Norton Essentials for PowerBook.

He returned to Apple as an Apple Fellow in 1995. In 1998, he was a co-founder of Garage Technology Ventures, a venture capital firm that has made investments in Pandora Radio, Tripwire, The Motley Fool and D.light Design. In 2007, he founded Truemors, a free-flow rumor mill, that sold to NowPublic. He is also a founder at Alltop, an online magazine rack.

In March 2013, Kawasaki joined Google as an advisor to Motorola. His role was to create a Google+ mobile device community.

In April 2014, Kawasaki became the chief evangelist of Canva. It is a free graphic design website for non-designers as well as professionals and was founded in January 2013.

On March 24, 2015, Kawasaki joined Wikimedia Foundation's board of trustees. He stepped down at the end of December 2016.

On April 25, 2017, WikiTribune mentioned him as an adviser.

On February 26, 2019, Penguin Group released Wise Guy, described as Kawasaki's most personal book to date. While the book is written as what could be considered a memoir, it contains a series of vignettes that include various personal experiences that Kawasaki says have enlightened and inspired him.

In December 2019, Kawasaki created a podcast called Remarkable People. There are now over 90 episodes available including interviews with Jane Goodall, Stephen Wolfram, Andrew Yang and Sal Khan. Kawasaki has stated that he believed the podcast was his best and most under appreciated work.

== Personal life ==
Kawasaki and his wife have four children: Nicodemus ("Nic"), Noah, Nohemi, and Nate. Nohemi and Nate are biological siblings whom the couple adopted from Guatemala.

== Bibliography ==
- The Macintosh Way (1990), ISBN 978-0-06-097338-4.
- Database 101 (1991), ISBN 978-0-938151-52-4.
- Selling the Dream (1992), ISBN 978-0-88730-600-6.
- The Computer Curmudgeon (1993), ISBN 978-1-56830-013-9.
- Hindsights (1995), ISBN 978-0-446-67115-6.
- How to Drive Your Competition Crazy (1995), ISBN 978-0-7868-6124-8.
- Rules for Revolutionaries (2000), ISBN 978-0-88730-995-3.
- The Art of the Start (2004), ISBN 978-1-59184-056-5.
- Reality Check (2008), ISBN 978-1-59184-223-1.
- Enchantment: The Art of Changing Hearts, Minds, and Actions (2011). Portfolio, London. ISBN 978-1-59184-379-5.
- What the Plus! Google+ for the Rest of Us (2012; only available on Amazon Kindle, iBooks, and on Google Play).
- APE: Author, Publisher, Entrepreneur—How to Publish a Book (2013). (Guy Kawasaki and Shawn Welch) Nononina Press, ISBN 978-0-9885231-0-4.
- The Art of Social Media: Power Tips for Power Users (2015; Guy Kawasaki and Peg Fitzpatrick), ISBN 978-0241199473.
- The Art of the Start 2.0: The Time-Tested, Battle-Hardened Guide for Anyone Starting Anything (2015), Portfolio, ISBN 978-1-59184-784-7.
- Wise Guy: Lessons from a Life (2019), Portfolio, ISBN 978-0-525-53861-5.
