= The Macintosh Way =

Book by former Apple evangelist Guy Kawasaki

- Author: Guy Kawasaki
- Language: English
- Genre: Non-fiction
- Publisher: Scott, Foresman and Company
- Publication date: 1990
- Publication place: United States
- ISBN: 0-673-46175-0
- OCLC: 19814888
- Dewey Decimal: 338.7/61004165/0973 20
- LC Class: HD9696.C64 A865 1990
- Followed by: Database 101

The Macintosh Way was the first book written by former Apple evangelist and marketing specialist Guy Kawasaki. Subtitled "the art of guerrilla management", the book focused on technology marketing and management and includes many anecdotes culled from Kawasaki's experience during the early development of the Macintosh.

== Chapter listing ==
1. First Blood
2. Macintosh Days
3. Environment
4. Great Products
5. Support
6. Marketing
7. User Groups
8. Evangelism
9. To Market, To Market
10. The Printed Word
11. Working with the Mothership
12. How to Give Good Demo
13. Presentation Manager
14. Trade Show Mavenship
15. How to Drive your (MS-DOS) Competitors Crazy
16. The Macintosh Guide to Dating and Marriage
17. Sayonara
