= Developer experience =

Field within software engineering

Developer experience (DX or DevEx) is a field within software engineering that examines how developers think, feel, and interact with their work environments, tools, and processes. The field combines principles from human-computer interaction, user experience, organizational psychology, and software engineering to improve developer productivity and satisfaction through systematic measurement and optimization of the development process.

== Origins and history ==
=== Industry origins ===
The term "developer experience" and its abbreviation DX were first coined in 2008 by Barry Jaspan who defined them as "the overall experience, satisfaction, and efficiency a software developer has when using a software development platform." The term gained prominence in industry literature through UX practitioner Jeremiah Lee Cohick's March 2011 article "Effective Developer Experience (DX)" in UX Magazine, which focused on platform-developer relationships. Cohick's framework centered on four core elements: trust and communication, education through documentation, development tools, and platform usability.

=== Academic foundations ===
The first formal academic definition was provided by Fabian Fagerholm and Jürgen Münch in their 2012 IEEE paper "Developer Experience: Concept and Definition," presented at the International Conference on Software and System Process. They defined DX as "a means for capturing how developers think and feel about their activities within their working environments, with the assumption that an improvement of the developer experience has positive impacts on characteristics such as sustained team and project performance."

Their framework established three psychological dimensions based on social psychology's "trilogy of mind": cognition (how developers think about their work), affect (how developers feel about their work), and conation (developers' motivations and values).

=== Modern frameworks ===
The field gained significant momentum with the 2021 publication of the SPACE framework by researchers from Microsoft, GitHub, and University of Victoria, which established a comprehensive approach to measuring developer productivity.

The 2023 DevEx framework, published in ACM Queue, further refined the field by identifying three core dimensions: feedback loops, cognitive load, and flow state.

== Core concepts ==
=== Theoretical framework ===
Developer experience encompasses multiple interconnected dimensions that collectively influence developer effectiveness and satisfaction. The academic literature has converged on several fundamental concepts:

Feedback Loops represent the speed and quality of responses to developer actions, encompassing build times, code review processes, and error detection systems.

Cognitive Load measures the mental processing required for developers to perform tasks, with research demonstrating that reducing extraneous cognitive burden allows developers to focus on creative problem-solving.

Flow State captures developers' ability to achieve periods of energized focus and enjoyment, drawing from Mihaly Csikszentmihalyi's psychological research on optimal experience.

=== Measurement methodologies ===
The field employs dual measurement approaches combining perceptual measures (developer surveys) with workflow measures (objective system data). Academic research emphasizes that neither approach alone provides sufficient insight.

Validated frameworks include:

- SPACE Framework (Satisfaction, Performance, Activity, Communication, Efficiency)
- DORA Metrics (deployment frequency, lead time, recovery time, change failure rate)
- Developer Experience Index measuring standardized factors across organizations

== Applications and impact ==
=== Productivity improvements ===
Research from Microsoft and GitHub's Developer Experience Lab, based on data from over 2,000 developers worldwide, documented significant productivity impacts. Developers with dedicated deep work time reported 50% higher productivity, while those finding their work engaging felt 30% more productive.

McKinsey & Company research across technology, finance, and pharmaceutical companies demonstrated 20-30% reductions in customer-reported product defects and 60-percentage-point improvements in customer satisfaction ratings from systematic DX investments.

=== Industry adoption ===
Research indicates that 78% of surveyed organizations have formal DevEx initiatives, with significant investment in dedicated developer experience teams. Atlassian's research across 2,100+ developers revealed that 97% lose significant time to inefficiencies, with 69% losing 8+ hours per week.

== Criticism and debates ==
=== Measurement validity concerns ===
The field faces criticism regarding measurement methodologies and potential unintended consequences. Software consultant Jason Yip argues that many activities that feel productive aren't actually productive, identifying a "productivity equivalence fallacy" where measurement systems can lead to gaming behaviors rather than genuine improvement.

=== Framework limitations ===
The creators of the influential SPACE Framework explicitly address several myths about developer productivity measurement, including the single metric fallacy and confusion between activity and productivity.

McKinsey methodology has generated controversy from software engineering leaders including Kent Beck, who raised concerns about focusing on effort and output metrics rather than outcomes.

== Relationship to other fields ==
=== User experience design ===
Developer experience applies user experience design principles specifically to developer tooling and workflows, sharing core methodologies including user-centricity, progressive disclosure, and iterative design processes.

=== Platform engineering ===
Platform engineering serves as the practical implementation layer for DX principles, with platform teams creating predefined, optimized workflows and toolsets designed to reduce cognitive load and provide self-service capabilities.

=== Human-computer interaction ===
DX incorporates human-computer interaction research methodologies and theoretical foundations, recognizing programming as fundamentally "a human activity" requiring HCI methods for understanding human-technology interactions.

== See also ==
- User experience
- Software engineering
- Human-computer interaction
- DevOps Research and Assessment
- Platform engineering
- Programming productivity
- Programming tool
