= Microsoft AI for Earth =

- Type of project: AI-based projects in the areas of agriculture, water, biodiversity and climate change
- Location: 40 countries
- Founder: AI for Social Good
- Key people: Lucas Joppa; Bruno Sánchez-Andrade Nuño; Alma Cárdenas; Harry Shum
- Funding: Microsoft Research

Microsoft AI For Earth Programme is a private project launched in July 2017 that uses Microsoft AI for earth and people related studies. Microsoft has allocated a $50 million budget for the programs.

AI for Earth has developed "the Planetary Computer", it offers APIs, data catalogs through azure storage and open source tools.

Initially Microsoft had invested $2 million but then started a "expanded strategic approach".

The initiative has 50 partnerships, 950 projects

== See also ==
- AI for Good
