= Toyota Connected North America =

Information technology company based in Plano, Texas

- Type: Subsidiary
- Industry: Information technology
- Founded: April 2016; 10 years ago in Plano, Texas
- Headquarters: Plano, Texas, USA
- Key people: Christopher Yang (CEO)
- Number of employees: 200+ (2023)
- Parent: Toyota
- Website: www.toyotaconnected.com

Toyota Connected North America is an information technology and data science company, founded in 2016 and based in Plano, Texas. Toyota Connected is a subsidiary of Toyota Motor Corporation, founded in partnership with Microsoft, and is involved in research and the development of technology for in-vehicle services, telematics and other forms of artificial intelligence.

== History ==
Toyota Connected North America was officially established in April 2016 in Plano, Texas, where the U.S. headquarters of Toyota Motor North America were also hosted; the company's foundation was intended as an expansion of Toyota’s partnership with Microsoft, which had originally begun in 2011 with the goal of building a platform for telematics services. As part of the venture, Microsoft had a 5 percent stake in Toyota Connected, and provided the company with access to their cloud-based platform Azure, in order to develop or expand Wireless services suited to track driving patterns, share information on traffic and weather conditions and monitoring personal health data, among other functions. Toyota Connected also announced it would support research projects on artificial intelligence, while simultaneously focusing on the analysis of data from vehicle sensors and cameras to develop algorithms for self-driving cars.

At inception, Toyota invested an estimated $5.5 million in Toyota Connected; Zach Hicks, who had previously served as the chief digital officer at Toyota Motor North America, was appointed as the company’s first CEO.

In July 2022, Hicks stepped down from his role as CEO and president of Toyota Connected following his retirement, being subsequently replaced by Steve Basra. In August 2023, former Toyota Connected Executive Vice President and Chief Operating Officer Christopher Yang was appointed as the company's new CEO, after Basra had left both the role and the company in June of the same year.

At the 2023 New York International Auto Show, Toyota Connected debuted its proprietary generative artificial intelligence tool to produce photorealistic images through text input.
