= Morgan Klaus Scheuerman =

American researcher

- Education: Harford Community College (AA); Goucher College (BA); University of Maryland, Baltimore (MS); University of Colorado Boulder (Ph.D.)
- Occupation: Research Scientist
- Employer: Sony
- Known for: Artificial Intelligence research
- Awards: Microsoft Ph.D. Fellowship
- Website: morgan-klaus.com

Morgan Klaus Scheuerman is an American researcher. Their research is centered around how identity intersects with technology, specifically focusing on gender and race in the artificial intelligence sector.

== Early life and career ==
Scheuerman completed their baccalaureate education at Goucher College, graduating in 2016. They later went pursued a graduate education in human–computer interaction and information science. During their time as a Ph.D. candidate, Scheuerman published primarily on the ethics of using facial recognition software, especially on transgender populations.

One of their most notable papers, How Computers See Gender: An Evaluation of Gender Classification in Commercial Facial Analysis and Image Labeling Services, garnered the attention of major news outlets including CNN, The Verge, and Quartz. They have been cited amongst other leading researchers and scientists studying artificial intelligence ethics, including Meredith Whittaker and Os Keyes, as well as presenting at national and international conferences.

Before starting in their current position as a research scientist for Sony's AI Ethics team, they held multiple positions and internships with large technology companies, including Twitch, Google, Microsoft, and Facebook. They currently also serve as a visiting scholar at their alma mater, University of Colorado Boulder.

Beyond research, Scheuerman engaged in advocacy and community-centered approaches to educate the public on artificial intelligence and human-computer interaction. For the Colorado State Legislature, they were one of 14 members of a nonpartisan task force to provide guidance for the creation legislature on artificial intelligence and technology in K-12 schools. Scheuerman was a vocal opponent with the advent of facial recognition technology employed by government organizations like TSA and the FBI. Scheuerman has given invited talks at R1 universities, including McGill University, and Umeå University. They have also published a manual on gender as a variable in human-computer interaction for non-academic community members

In 2020, Scheuerman served as a guest on the Radical AI podcast, Experian, and KUNC, discussing their work with gender diverse populations in the field of artificial intelligence. They have also been interviewed by the University of Colorado Boulder in 2021 and Gadfly Magazine in 2022.

=== Awards ===
- 2021: Microsoft's Ph.D. Fellowship
- 2020: Best Paper Award for How Computers See Gender: An Evaluation of Gender Classification in Commercial Facial Analysis and Image Labeling Services, at ACM's Computer-Supported Cooperative Work and Social Computing conference
