= Platform evangelism =

Platform evangelism (also called developer relations, developer and platform evangelism, developer advocacy, or API evangelism) is the application of technology evangelism to a multi-sided platform. It seeks to accelerate the growth of a platform's commercial ecosystem of complementary goods, created by independent (third-party) developers, as a means to the end of maximizing the platform's market share. This initiative focuses on providing developers the resources to innovate, participate, and provide feedback to grow the platform.

== Multi-sided platforms ==
A multi-sided platform creates value by bringing together two or more different groups who can create more value together than apart. Examples include buyers and sellers at an auction; readers and advertisers of a newspaper; and people at an online dating service. The platform vendor can profit by capturing a portion of the money that changes hands. Platform vendors can serve as de facto regulators of their markets.

An example of platform evangelism is the Developer and Platform Evangelism Division at Microsoft, which coordinates the personal computer (PC) and server's programming model. It also provides tools for the Microsoft.NET platform, facilitating synergies between this system's Enterprise Server products and the Windows platform. According to Jim Allchin, the former Platforms Group Vice President, the division also provides support to millions of software developers focused on high-performance and affordable technologies.

== Developers and consumers ==
Many platforms have only two sides: one of consumers and the other of independent (third-party) developers. Independent developers produce and sell complementary goods, also called "platform applications," directly to the platform's consumers. These applications rely on the platform's services to function. Generally speaking, consumers prefer a platform with more and higher-value applications, while developers prefer a platform with more and higher-paying consumers.

Recent examples of two-sided platforms that successfully attracted both consumers and developers include Apple iPhone, Nintendo Wii, Adobe Flash, and Microsoft Windows.

Other examples include household electricity (for appliances), the farm tractor's three-point hitch (for farming implements), camera lens mounts (for interchangeable lenses), the Picatinny rail (for gun-mounted accessories), and media players such as record players, CD players, and DVD players (for media content).

== Functions ==
Platform evangelism establishes and nurtures a platform ecosystem, which requires five simultaneous activities: 1) sales, 2) enablement, 3) feedback, 4) intelligence, and 5) regulation.

=== Ecosystem sales ===
Ecosystem sales is the attempt to convince third parties to develop complementary goods for the platform's commercial ecosystem. The characteristics of successful platform evangelists and salespersons are essentially identical, including deep product knowledge, empathy, humor, integrity, communication skills, positive attitude, infectious enthusiasm, a sincere desire to help others, etc. The primary difference is in "hunger for money" among salespersons. This is unlikely to be satisfied by technology evangelism, which is more likely to be a cost center than a profit center, and hence incapable of paying sales-like commissions.

==== Developer enablement resources ====
This aspect of platform evangelism can be seen as vendor-sponsored change agency in the diffusion of an innovation (the platform). As such, platform evangelism is responsible for creating the resources that enable developers to progress swiftly through the innovation adoption process ("developer enablement resources").

Each different phase of the platform adoption process requires different developer enablement resources. It is the responsibility of the platform evangelist to ensure that each developer enablement resource comes into existence in a timely manner.

=== Ecosystem feedback ===
Because developers will often choose an inferior platform if its rate of improvement suggests that it will soon become the superior platform, even the superior platform must improve rapidly. To facilitate this rapid improvement, platform evangelism organizes and champions the feedback of ecosystem developers within the platform vendor.

=== Ecosystem intelligence ===
Ecosystem intelligence gathers information about the activities and intentions of other platform vendors from sources in and around the developer ecosystem.

=== Ecosystem regulation ===
To avoid the market failure of multi-sided platforms, platform evangelism will often engage in de facto regulation of the commercial ecosystem that surrounds its platform. Such regulation combines legal, technological, informational, and other instruments (along with price setting) to minimize the costs of externalities, complexity, uncertainty, information asymmetry, and coordination problems.

== Platform competition and platform evangelism ==
Often, many competing two-sided platforms―each offering roughly the same benefits on the developer side―start diffusing through a market at approximately the same time. Each platform's vendor competes with the other vendors, via platform evangelism, to gain market share among the market's potential developers.

== Self-fulfilling prophecy ==
If it is expensive to re-develop an application to target a second (or third) platform, then developers will tend to adopt, first, the platform which they believe has the highest lifetime profit opportunity. This tends to become a self-fulfilling prophecy, in which the platform which is initially perceived to have the highest lifetime profit opportunity tends to accumulate the most applications, which then makes it more attractive to consumers, which makes it more attractive to developers, etc., in a virtuous cycle, until a critical mass (also known as a tipping point) is reached, such that it out-competes the other platforms…and eventually does indeed come to offer the highest lifetime profit potential, as prophesied. This makes it very important for a platform vendor to convince developers from the outset, even before the platform becomes commercially available to consumers, that its platform will have the highest lifetime profit potential. This contributes to the high-tech industry's hype cycle.

== Network effects, path dependence, and de facto standards ==
If the market has strong network effects, then those platforms which gain the fewest early adopters may cease to exist, making them unavailable to later potential adopters. This is path dependence. If the number of reasonable platform choices in a market falls to 1, then that "only reasonable choice" becomes the market's de facto standard (also known as its Dominant Design) by definition.

== Switching costs, lock-in, and profitability ==
If the cost of switching away from a de facto standard to a new alternative exceeds the benefit gained by the earliest market participants who make that switch, then the market will tend to become locked into the de facto standard, with its market share approaching 100%. Markets that are highly interconnected are more resistant to change than less interconnected markets. Lock-in tends to make a de facto standard impervious to incremental competition, such that only a disruptive innovation can displace it. Owning a locked-in de facto standard can be a license to print money for a very long time.

== Mature share ==
Not all markets become locked into a de facto standard, and indeed, many factors act against such an outcome. However, owning the first platform to establish a critical mass of complementary goods, with high switch-out costs, can create first-mover advantages that can go a long way towards ensuring that one gets a viable share of the mature market.

== Means to an end ==
Therefore, with regard to a two-sided platform's developer side, it is platform evangelism's responsibility to:

- Increase the quantity and quality of the platform's complementary goods;
- Provide potential developers of complementary goods with a compelling opportunity for profit;
- Increase awareness of this opportunity among potential developers of complementary goods;
- Reduce the cost and risk associated with developing complementary goods;
- Increase the percentage of the market's complementary goods that are developed first, best, or only for its platform;
- Increase the network effects generated by its platform and its complementary goods;
- Increase the platform's switching-out costs, while decreasing its switching-in costs;
- Oppose the efforts of competing platform vendors to do likewise.

In short, it is platform evangelism's responsibility to design, develop, maintain, and extend the size and health of the platform's ecosystem, such that potential developers will choose to participate first, best, or only in that ecosystem.

Ultimately, these are all means to the end of gaining the highest possible share of the developer side of the targeted market. Whether this is, in turn, a means to the end of maximizing share on the market's consumer side, or vice versa, depends on the platform vendor's pricing strategy.

- If the platform vendor profits primarily from the developer side (as Adobe does with Flash), then maximizing developer share is the ultimate end.
- If the platform vendor profits primarily from the consumer side (as Microsoft does with Windows), then maximizing developer share is a means to the ultimate end of maximizing consumer share.

== Theory and management ==
The economics of multi-sided markets have only recently been subject to academic scrutiny, so the theory underpinning platform evangelism's regulatory function is likely to be poorly understood by its practitioners—a situation that has contributed to many disastrous market failures.

More generally, evangelizing the developer side of a multi-sided platform can be seen as using social influence to accelerate the diffusion of an innovation, within a dynamic system, in the presence of network effects, for economic gain (to the platform vendor or to society as a whole). Therefore, a solid understanding of the theory and practice of social influence, diffusion of innovations, system dynamics, innovation dynamics, network effects, innovation economics, and the economics of multi-sided platforms is essential to the design and management of efficient and effective platform evangelism campaigns.

Most of the theory and practice of platform evangelism, as influenced by these theoretical underpinnings, has yet to be comprehensively documented, and is therefore not available to novice evangelists or their managers. Because the development of expertise in any domain takes considerable time and practice, vendors of new platforms cannot reasonably be expected to have in-house expertise in designing and managing effective platform evangelism campaigns.

== See also ==
- Evangelism marketing
- Technology evangelism
- Technology evangelist
- Apple evangelist
- Network effect
- Vendor lock-in
- System dynamics
- Innovation economics
- Diffusion of innovations
- Two-sided markets
- Community organizing
- Sales
- Marketing
