= John Shewchuk =

American technologist and executive

- Occupation(s): Executive; Technologist
- Employer: Microsoft
- Known for: Technical Fellow at Microsoft.

John Shewchuk is an American technologist and executive. Shewchuk is a Microsoft Technical Fellow, a position which he was chosen for by Microsoft co-founder Bill Gates. He is the Host of the Decoded Show. Shewchuk is the founder of the .NET Services team and he was responsible for creating Azure AD.

== Career ==
In 1993 Shewchuk joined Microsoft as Group Program Manager, and he then served as Software Engineer and Distinguished Engineer. Today he serves as the Head of Commercial Software Engineering team at Microsoft, focusing on building a third-party application ecosystem

== Education ==
Shewchuk received his bachelor's degree in Electrical Engineering from Union College and his master's degree in Computer Science from Brown University.

== Decoded Show ==
In 2016 host John Shewchuk and Executive Producer David Mendlen introduced the Decoded Show. The show offers regular insight into developer focused topics with interesting people from the industry. The Decoded Show has hosted speakers including actor Kevin Hart
