= Technology evangelist =

Person who gains significant acclaim for a given technology

A technology evangelist is someone who builds a critical mass of support for a specific technology, and then establishes it as a technical standard in a market that is subject to network effects. The word evangelism is borrowed from the context of religious evangelism due to the similarity of sharing information about a particular concept with the intention of having others adopt that concept. This is typically accomplished by showcasing the potential uses and benefits of a technology to help others understand how they can use it for themselves.

== Target areas ==
Platform evangelism is one target of technology evangelism, in which the vendor of a two-sided platform attempts to accelerate the production of complementary goods by independent developers (e.g., during its early years, Facebook worked on creating an ecosystem of third party developers, encouraging them to create games or develop mobile apps that could enhance users' experiences with Facebook).

Professional technology evangelists are often employed by firms seeking to establish their technologies as de facto standards. Their work could also entail the training of personnel, including top managers so that they acquire skills and competencies necessary to adopt new technology or new technological initiative. There are even instances when technology evangelism becomes an aspect of a managerial position.

Open-source evangelists, on the other hand, operate independently. Evangelists also participate in defining open standards. Non-professional technology evangelists may act out of altruism or self-interest (e.g., to gain the benefits of early adoption or the network effect).

== History of term ==
In Christianity, the word evangelist comes from the Koine Greek word "εὐαγγέλιον" (transliterated as euangelion) via Latinised evangelium, as used in the canonical titles of the Four Gospels, attributed to Matthew, Mark, Luke, and John (also known as the Four Evangelists).

The term software evangelist was coined by Mike Murray of Apple Computer's Macintosh computer division in the early 1980s. It was part of Apple's drive to compete with IBM and it specifically described the initiative to win over third-party developers rhetorically to persuade them to develop software and applications for the Macintosh platform. In Guy Kawasaki's own words, it meant "using fervor and zeal (but never money) to convince software developers to create products for a computer with no installed base, 128K of RAM, no hard disk, no documentation, and no technical support, made by a flaky company that IBM was about to snuff out." The first so-identified technology evangelist was Mike Boich — who promoted the Macintosh computer.

In 1987, Steve Ballmer introduced the technology evangelist role at Microsoft to build excitement and drive adoption of Windows and its development tools.

The job is often closely related to both sales and training but requires specific technology marketing skills. For example, convincing a potential buyer or user to change from older methods to new ones. There is also the case of adopting new products such as green IT. The marketing aspect involved in technology evangelism was strongly influenced by Geoffrey Moore and his books concerning the technology adoption lifecycle. One of his positions maintain that the role of the evangelist becomes critical when addressing what he identified as the "chasm" that exists between early and mainstream adoption.

Technology evangelism is sometimes associated with an internal employee assigned to encourage new practices within an organization. Methods of evangelism available include a modified STREET process (Scope, Track, Rank, Evaluate, Evangelize, Transfer) and the process that takes advantage of the hype cycle. Evangelism can also assume the form of a learning process and employ tools such as learning management systems (LMS).

== Role ==
Technology evangelists aim to inspire enthusiasm for a product or idea. Successful evangelism requires strong corporate support and a deep understanding of technology. Evangelists also draw on diverse skills, including marketing and psychology. A study by Frederic Lucas-Conwell considers the principal characteristics of the technology evangelist role to include:

1. Generosity with one's time while proactively initiating and leveraging relationships to accomplish goals.
2. Clear and persuasive communication of large amounts of information, adapting content delivery to audience's specific needs.
3. Strong understanding of interpersonal and team dynamics, willing to collaborate with others.
4. Casual and outgoing persona with an animated communication style that attracts others into conversation.
5. Interested in relationship-building and forging a team for technical work.
6. Focused on achieving end-goals, delegating details to other individuals.

== Notable examples ==
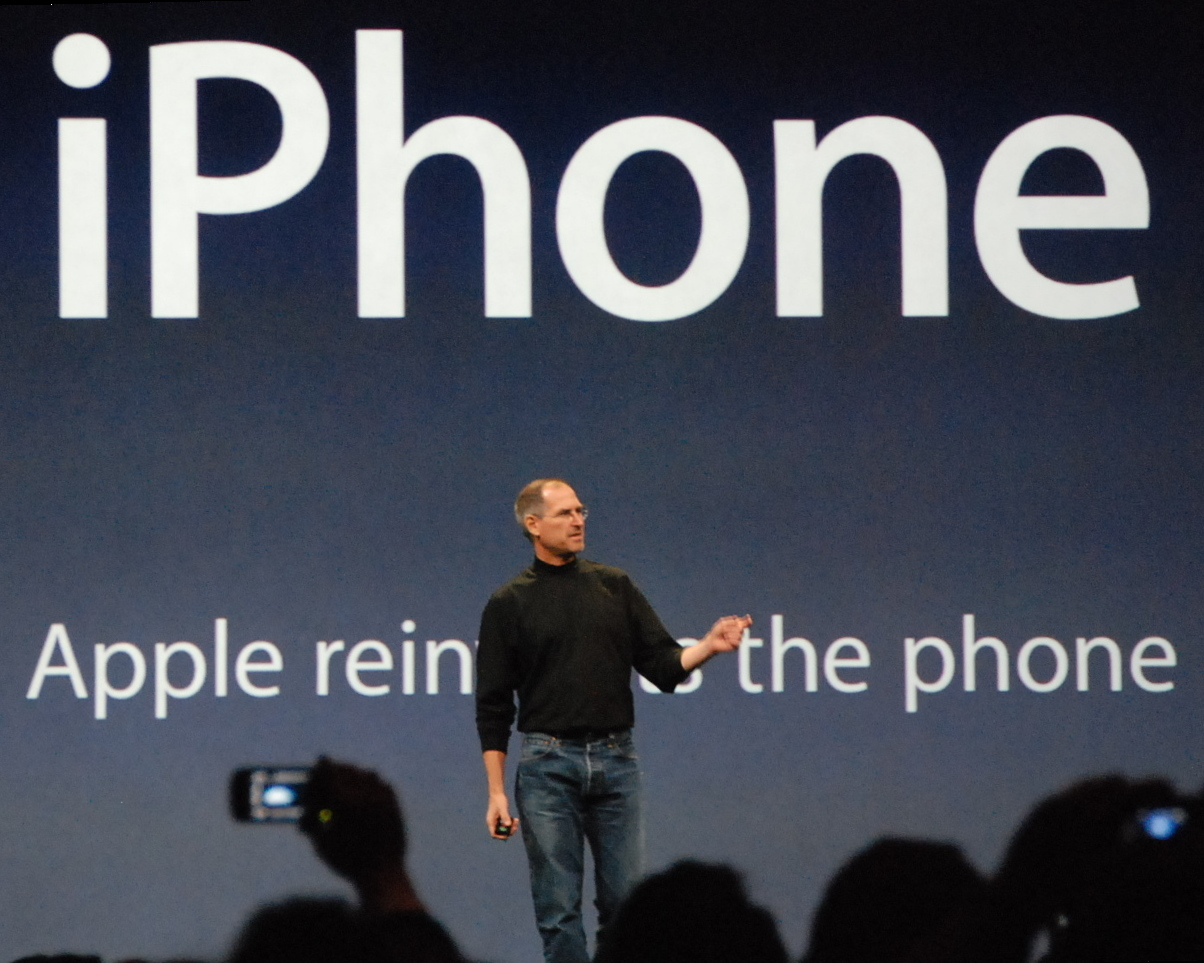
Steve Jobs sharing the technology of the iPhone at an Apple event

Notable technology evangelists in the commercial arena include Steve Jobs (Apple Inc.), Vint Cerf (Internet), Don Box, Guy Kawasaki, Chris Crawford, Alex St. John, Robert Scoble, Myriam Joire (Pebble), Christian Allen (Epic Games), Mudasser Zaheer (Hewlett Packard Enterprise), and Dan Martin (MasterCard).

Court records indicate that James Plamondon was a leading theorist, strategist, and practitioner of technology evangelism at Microsoft during its establishment of Microsoft Windows as the de facto standard PC operating system.

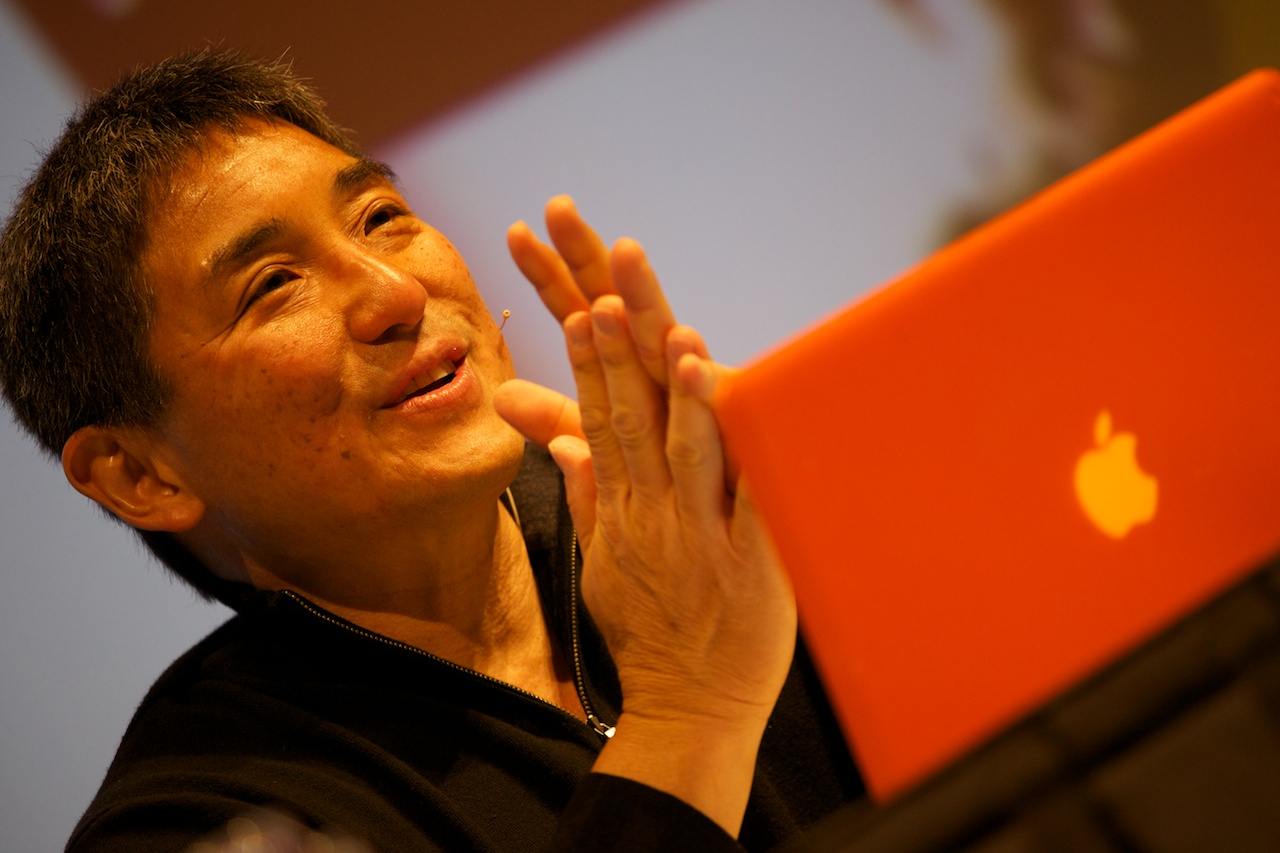
Guy Kawasaki with a Macintosh laptop computer product

Kawasaki, on the other hand, was credited for the remarkable growth of the software developed for the Macintosh, jumping from a few dozen products to more than 600 in less than a year of spreading the so-called Macintosh gospel. He claims, "Evangelism isn't a job title, it's a way of life."

== See also ==
- Technology adoption lifecycle
- Diffusion of innovations
- Open-source advocacy
- Evangelism marketing
