= Kimberly Weems =

American statistician

Kimberly Sherrille Weems is an American statistician, active in mentoring women and members of underrepresented minority groups in statistics and encouraging them to pursue advanced studies in statistics. She is an associate professor of statistics at North Carolina Central University. Her research interests include count data and statistical dispersion. She was recognized by Mathematically Gifted & Black as a Black History Month 2019 Honoree.

== Early life and education ==
Weems is African-American, and grew up in Cartersville, Georgia as the daughter of a schoolteacher. She majored in mathematics at Spelman College, with a minor in Spanish, and became interested in statistics there through the mentorship of Nagambal Shah.

She completed her Ph.D. in applied mathematics at the University of Maryland, College Park in 2000. Together with Sherry Scott and Tasha Inniss, she was one of the first three African-American women to do so. Her dissertation, On Robustness against Misspecified Mixing Distribution in Generalized Linear Mixed Models, concerned the robust statistics of generalized linear mixed models, and was supervised by Paul John Smith.

== Career and influences ==
After an internship at the National Security Agency, and postdoctoral research at North Carolina State University, Weems became a faculty member at North Carolina State University, and moved to North Carolina Central University in 2015.

As well as her mother, Nagambal Shah, and Paul John Smith, other statisticians named by Weems as influential in her research and career include Kimberly Sellers, Dennis Boos, Jacqueline Hughes-Oliver, and Sastry Pantula.
