= Bonita V. Saunders =

American mathematician

- Education: Old Dominion University
- Known for: Digital Library of Mathematical Functions
- Scientific career
- Fields: Mathematics
- Workplaces: National Institute of Standards and Technology
- Thesis: Algebraic Grid Generation Using Tensor Product B-Splines (1985)
- Doctoral advisor: Philip W. Smith

Bonita Valerie Saunders is an American mathematician specializing in mathematical visualization. She works at the National Institute of Standards and Technology in the Applied and Computational Mathematics Division of the Information Technology Laboratory, where she contributes to the Digital Library of Mathematical Functions as the Visualization Editor and the principal designer of visualizations and graphs.

== Professional career ==
Saunders received her Ph.D. in computational and applied mathematics from Old Dominion University in 1985. She earned her M.S. in Mathematics from the University of Virginia and her B.A. in Mathematics from the College of William and Mary. She worked at the BDM corporation for four years and has published a number of papers. A list of her papers can be found at the dblp "Computer Science" bibliography. Her current research interests include, "Visualization of Complex Functions Data, Numerical Software for Special Functions, Numerical Grid Generation, [and] Numerical Solution of Partial Differential Equations."

Saunders has made a number of contributions to the Mathematical Association of America (MAA). From 1999 to 2002, she served as the MD-DC-VA Section treasurer. From 2004 to 2009, she was on the selection committee for the Etta Z. Falconer Lecture (sponsored by the MAA and the Association for Women in Mathematics AWM). She was also on the MAA Business Industry Government Committee from 2012-2017, and was the MD-DC-VA Section Representative to the MAA Congress in 2019. As of 2020 she is on the editorial board for Mathematics Magazine and the Society for Industrial and Applied Mathematics (SIAM) Board of Trustees.

== Awards and honors ==
The National Association of Mathematicians chose Saunders to give the 2001 Claytor Lecture at the Joint Mathematics Meetings.

The US Department of Commerce awarded her research group a Gold Medal for Distinguished Scientific/Engineering Achievement in 2011, in recognition for her work in creating the online Digital Library of Mathematical Functions.

In 2017, Saunders was awarded the NIST Information Technology Laboratory Outstanding Contribution Award for Excellence in Technical Leadership.

In 2018, Mathematically Gifted & Black made Saunders a Black History Month honoree.

In 2019 she accepted the Excellence in Research in Mathematics and Computer Science award from the Washington Academy of Sciences and became a Fellow of the Washington Academy of Sciences.

Saunders gave the 2021 AWM-MAA Etta Zuber Falconer Lecture at MathFest 2021.
