= Mathematically Gifted & Black =

African mathematical website

- Founded: December 2016
- Founders: Erica Graham, Raegan Higgins, Candice Renee Price, Shelby Wilson
- Website: mathematicallygiftedandblack.com

Mathematically Gifted & Black (MGB) is a website that features the accomplishments of black scholars in mathematical sciences. In addition to highlighting the work and lives of established mathematicians in the African Diaspora, the platform aims to support the next generation of these mathematicians as they pursue career goals in mathematics and mathematical sciences fields.

Featured mathematicians must have a degree in mathematics that they use in their work and be recognized as a leader in research, education, industry, government, academia, or outreach.

Founders of MGB received the Association for Women in Mathematics’ 2022 AWM Presidential Recognition Award.

== History ==
Mathematically Gifted & Black was founded in 2017 by Erica Graham (Bryn Mawr College), Raegan Higgins (Texas Tech University), Candice Price (Smith College), and Shelby Wilson (University of Maryland). The professors created the website with the intent of highlighting the contributions and lives of black mathematicians. The name of the website was partially inspired by the song "To Be Young, Gifted and Black" performed by Nina Simone with lyrics by Weldon Irvine.

== Notable people recognized ==
Mathematically Gifted & Black features a collective archive called the "Circle of Excellence" that documents the website's Black History Month honorees that have been recognized since the site's inception. During the month of February, a prominent black mathematician is recognized each day, their accomplishments are highlighted, and a short Q&A with the recipient is often included. The mathematicians featured by MGB include university professors and a diverse variety of mathematical professionals.

Several notable individuals are included among the extensive archive of honorees. Their names appear below.

2025 Black History Month Honorees

- Gregory Battle
- Zachary K. Collier
- Tolulope Fadina
- Trajan Hammonds
- Dr. Oluwasegun Michael Ibrahim
- Gafari Lukumon
- Dwight Anderson Williams II

2024 Black History Month Honorees

- Reginald Cyril Wallis Anderson
- Alvina J. Atkinson
- Scarlett Bellamy
- Noel Bourne
- Tai-Danae Bradley
- Adrian Cartier
- Dr. Luke K Davis
- Toka Diagana
- Edray Herber Goins
- Kevin Harris Jr.
- Talon Johnson
- Lakeshia Legette Jones
- Nadia Monroe Mills
- Yewande Olubummo
- Fadekemi Janet Osaye
- Noelle Sawyer

2023 Black History Month Honorees

- Nicholas Arosemena
- Peter Eley
- Nancy L. Griesinger
- Abba B. Gumel
- Lateefah Id-Deen
- Brett Jefferson
- Clarence W Johnson
- John H. Johnson Jr.
- Chartese Jones
- Chawne Kimber
- Haydee Lindo
- Marissa Loving
- Marrielle Myers
- Sybil Prince Nelson
- Tayler Fernandes Nuñez
- José Mijares Palacios
- Ayanna Perry
- Maia Powell
- Candice Renee Price
- Aquia Richburg
- JoAnn Scales
- Ruthmae Sears
- Kagba N Suaray
- Angela Tabiri
- Jana Talley
- Abiy Tasissa
- Karen Taylor
- Lawrence Udeigwe
- Nakeya Williams
- Christina Willis

2022 Black History Month Honorees

- LaQuanta Bivens-Hernandez
- Johnny Earl Brown
- Kyndall Allen Brown
- Tianna Burke
- Bronte Burleigh-Jones
- Jamylle Carter
- Adrian Coles
- Renee Colquitt
- Kerry Coote
- Nathaniel Dean
- Dan Eckhardt
- Stacey D. Finley
- Uduak George
- Isaac Harris
- Jacqueline Milton Hicks
- Karen Riley Jeffers
- Joseph Johnson
- Felicia Jones
- Genevieve Knight
- Marsha Lee
- Willie T Little III
- Treasure Reneé Lynch
- LaShonda Mackey
- Camille A. McKayle
- Christian McRoberts
- Cassandra McZeal
- Janis M. Oldham
- Carl Oliver
- Ronald Page II
- Kendra E. Pleasant
- Sandra Richardson
- Aqeeb Sabree
- Machell Town
- Dani Wadlington
- Rika Wheaton
- Ashley Wheeler
- Brandis Whitfield
- Bryan Williams
- Jahmario Williams
- Pamela Williams
- Shelby Wilson
- Patrice Woods
- Abubakarr Yillah

2021 Black History Month Honorees

- Khalilah Beal-Uribe
- Wako Tasisa Bungula
- Robert Berry
- Cory Colbert
- Keisha Cook
- Ranthony A.C. Edmonds
- Geremias Polanco Encarnacion
- Gloria F. Gilmer
- Piper Harron
- Roderick Holmes
- Nicole Michelle Joseph
- Lester Mackey
- Reginald RB McGee
- Brittany L. Mosby
- Virginia Newell
- Jean Pierre Mutanguha
- Marieme Ngom
- Dionne Price
- Olivia Prosper
- Annie T. Randall
- Angela Robinson
- James L. Solomon
- Ashley J. Swain
- Dionne Swift
- Dante A. Tawfeeq
- David S. Torain II
- Rachel E. Vincent-Finley
- Shanise Walker

2020 Black History Month Honorees

- Nathan Alexander
- Karen D. King
- Omayra Ortega
- Aissa Wade
- Bobby Wilson

2019 Black History Month Honorees

- Naiomi Cameron
- Melvin Currie
- Christina Eubanks-Turner
- Evelyn Boyd Granville
- Shelly M. Jones
- Mark E. Lewis
- Dawn Lott
- Anisah N. Nu'Man
- Kasso Okoudjou
- Erica N. Walker
- Kimberly Weems
- Floyd Williams

2018 Black History Month Honorees

- Ron Buckmire
- Monica Cox
- Gloria Conyers Hewitt
- Raegan Higgins
- Rudy Horne
- Carolyn Mahoney
- William A. Massey
- Bonita V. Saunders
- Jeanette Scissum
- Kimberly Sellers
- Clarence F. Stephens
- Talitha Washington

2017 Black History Month Honorees

- Sylvia Bozeman
- Carla Cotwright-Williams
- Sylvester James Gates
- Linda B. Hayden
- Freeman A. Hrabowski III
- Jacqueline Hughes-Oliver
- Fern Hunt
- Tasha Inniss
- Trachette Jackson
- Raymond L. Johnson
- Shirley McBay
- Ronald E. Mickens
- Mohamed Omar
- Arlie Petters
- Chelsea Walton
- Suzanne Weekes
- Scott W. Williams
- Talithia Williams
- Ulrica Wilson
