= Diagana =

Diagana is a surname. Notable people with the surname include:

- Alpha Diagana (born 1993), Mauritanian runner
- Moussa Diagana (1946–2018), Mauritanian writer in the French language
- Stéphane Diagana (born 1969), French track and field athlete
- Toka Diagana, Mauritanian-American mathematician

== See also ==
- Stephane-Diagana Athletic Hall, in Lyon, France
