= Blackwell–Tapia prize =

Award in mathematics

The Blackwell–Tapia Prize is a mathematics award that recognizes active mathematical scientists who have (1) contributed and continue to contribute significantly to research in their fields of expertise, and (2) served as role models for mathematical scientists and students from underrepresented minority groups or contributed in other significant ways to addressing the problem of the underrepresentation of minorities in mathematics It is presented every other year at the Blackwell-Tapia Conference, which promotes mathematical excellence by minority researchers and is sponsored by the National Science Foundation. The prize is named for David Blackwell and Richard Tapia.

== Recipients ==
The following mathematicians have been honored with the Blackwell–Tapia Prize:

Year	Recipient	Hosted by
2024	Illya Hicks	ICERM
2020	Tatiana Toro	SAMSI
2018	Ronald E. Mickens	ICERM
2016	Mariel Vázquez	NIMBioS
2014	Jacqueline Hughes-Oliver	IPAM
2012	Ricardo Cortez	ICERM
2010	Trachette Jackson	MBI
2008	Juan Meza	SAMSI
2006	William A. Massey	IMA
2004	Rodrigo Bañuelos	IPAM
2002	Arlie Petters	MSRI

== See also ==
- List of mathematics awards
