= Newville, Alabama =

- Town
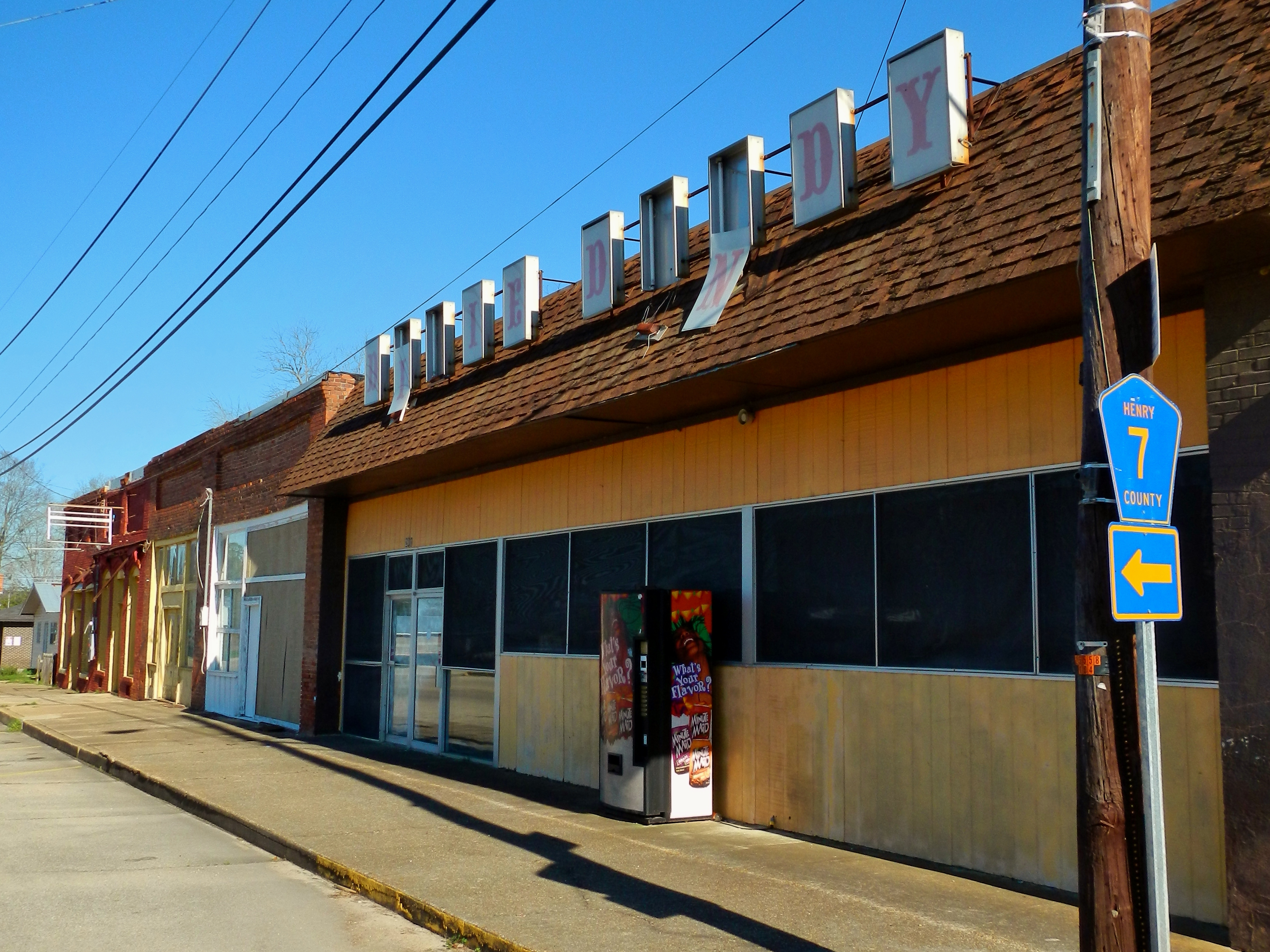
- Newville in 2012

- Location of Newville in Henry County, Alabama.
- Coordinates: 31°25′14″N 85°20′12″W
- Country: United States
- State: Alabama
- County: Henry

Area
  - Total: 4.02 sq mi (10.41 km^{2})
  - Land: 4.02 sq mi (10.41 km^{2})
  - Water: 0 sq mi (0.00 km^{2})
- Elevation: 400 ft (120 m)

Population (2020)
  - Total: 544
  - Density: 135.4/sq mi (52.27/km^{2})
- Time zone: UTC-6 (Central (CST))
  - Summer (DST): UTC-5 (CDT)
- ZIP code: 36353
- Area code: 334
- FIPS code: 01-54600
- GNIS feature ID: 2406991

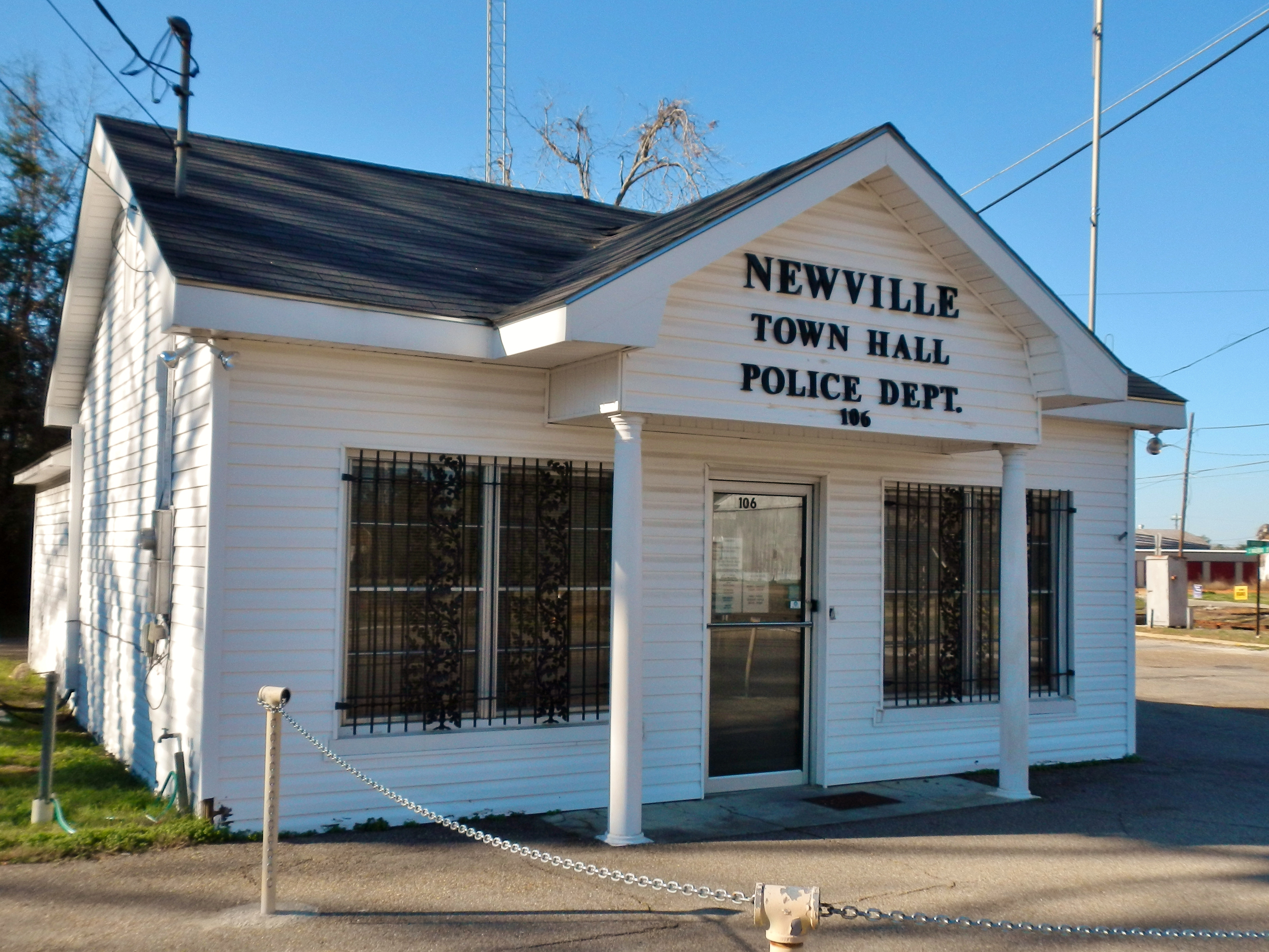
Newville Town Hall and Police Department

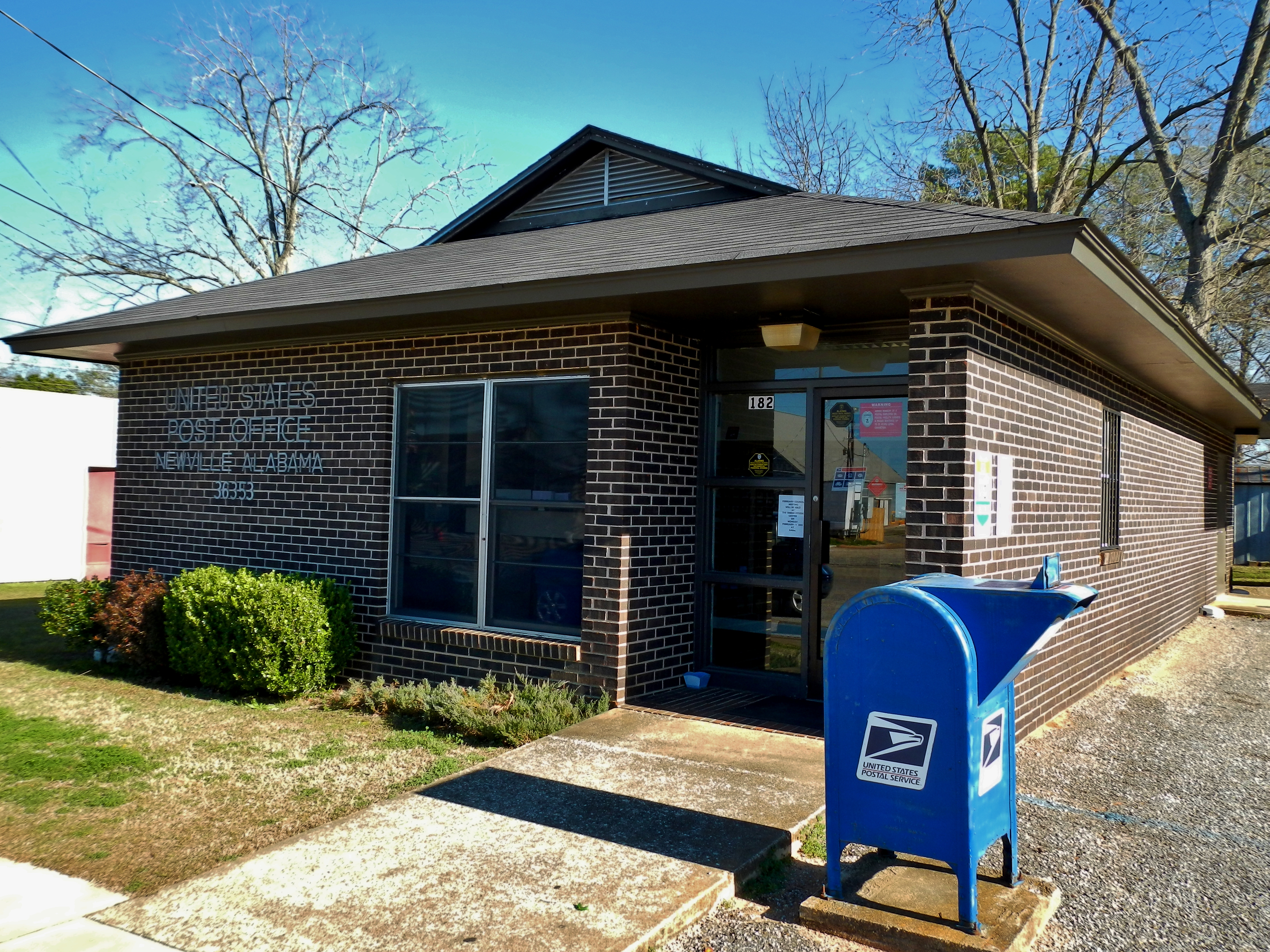
Newville Post Office (ZIP code: 36353)

Newville is a town in Henry County, Alabama, United States. It is part of the Dothan, Alabama Metropolitan Statistical Area. At the 2020 census, the population was 544.

== History ==
James Madison Wells founded a village called "Wells" c. 1882. When the Abbeville Southern Railroad laid tracks through the town in 1893, its name was changed to "Wells Station". The post office was built in 1894. Wells Station incorporated as "Newville" in 1903.

The town of Newville became prosperous with merchants, banks, lodges, doctors, churches, Newville High School, Rosenwald High School, societies, a newspaper, a depot, sawmills, cotton gins, mule stables and all the elements required by a developing town. Newville's slow decline commenced after the Great Depression due to farm mechanization and loss of commerce.

=== Newville Baptist Church Cemetery ===
James M. and Catherine Wells donated one-half acre of land in 1887 for the site of the church and cemetery. The oldest known grave is that of William Y. Kirkland who died April 10, 1891. The church paid W.M. Harris fifty dollars in 1901 for two and one-half acres of land for the cemetery. In 1947, burial spaces were sold for 25 center per square foot. Nancy Price gave the church one acre of land for the cemetery in 1958. There are over 700 marked and unmarked graves. The Newville Cemetery was listed on the Alabama Historic Cemetery Register in 2005.

=== Newville High School ===
The first known school in Newville was at Center Church in 1881. When Grange Hall was built in 1891, church service and school were held on the first floor. In 1913, Grange Hall was torn down and the wood was used to build a school. Newville Public School became Newville Junior High in 1920. In 1923, it was decided to build a modern brick school. Newville High School was opened in 1929. The school building at Concord was moved to Newville in 1935. In 1936, the school building burned. A new structure was built with five rooms and a large auditorium. In 1938, the Works Progress Administration built the vocational building. When bathrooms were added in 1944, Newville School became one of the most modern buildings in Henry County. The Newville High School band was organized in 1961. In 1968, Newville High School closed.

=== Newville Rosenwald School ===
In 1894, the first known black school in Newville was organized and a building was built. The Jacksonian Enterprise School opened in May 1894. Parents and patrons financially supported this school. The school library contained more books than any school in this part of the country. The school grounds included Store's Grove, a circular grove of 104 oak trees with a 30-foot avenue running through the middle of it. Each tree was named in honor of a patron. In 1919, the Newville Community requested assistance for the school. They received it from the Rosenwald Foundation. A new school was built and named "Newville Rosenwald School". The Henry County Board of Education began to contribute to the finances of Newville Rosenwald School about 1922. During the late 1940s, Newville Rosenwald School became a high school. It was about this time that the original school burned down and a new building was constructed. In 1968 Rosenwald High School was closed.

== Geography ==
Newville is located in southwestern Henry County. Alabama State Route 173 passes through the center of town as Broad Street, leading north 13 miles (21 km) to Abbeville and south 6 miles (10 km) to Headland. U.S. Route 431, a four-lane highway, cuts through the southeast corner of Newville, also connecting Newville and Headland. Dothan is 15 miles (24 km) to the south via US 431.

According to the U.S. Census Bureau, Newville has a total area of 4.0 square miles (10.4 km^{2}), all land.

== Demographics ==
Historical population
Census	Pop.	Note	%±
1910	522		—
1920	547		4.8%
1930	528		−3.5%
1940	578		9.5%
1950	565		−2.2%
1960	546		−3.4%
1970	465		−14.8%
1980	814		75.1%
1990	531		−34.8%
2000	553		4.1%
2010	539		−2.5%
2020	544		0.9%
U.S. Decennial Census; 2013 Estimate

As of the census of 2000, there were 553 people, 221 households, and 163 families residing in the town. The population density was 137.6 inhabitants per square mile (53.1/km^{2}). There were 246 housing units at an average density of 61.2 per square mile (23.6/km^{2}). The racial makeup of the town was 52.80% White, 44.30% Black or African American, 2.71% from other races, and 0.18% from two or more races. 2.35% of the population were Hispanic or Latino of any race.

There were 221 households, out of which 32.6% had children under the age of 18 living with them, 52.0% were married couples living together, 17.2% had a female householder with no husband present, and 26.2% were non-families. 23.1% of all households were made up of individuals, and 11.8% had someone living alone who was 65 years of age or older. The average household size was 2.50 and the average family size was 2.93.

In the town, the population was spread out, with 27.1% under the age of 18, 5.8% from 18 to 24, 27.8% from 25 to 44, 21.5% from 45 to 64, and 17.7% who were 65 years of age or older. The median age was 37 years. For every 100 females, there were 86.2 males. For every 100 females age 18 and over, there were 84.9 males.

The median income for a household in the town was $27,596, and the median income for a family was $31,375. Males had a median income of $25,714 versus $21,250 for females. The per capita income for the town was $13,890. About 8.9% of families and 14.9% of the population were below the poverty line, including 16.4% of those under age 18 and 20.2% of those age 65 or over.

== Notable people ==
- Monica Cox, Professor and department chair, Ohio State University
- Willie Tullis, former NFL defensive back
- Frederick Palmer Whiddon, founder and long-time president of the University of South Alabama

== See also ==
- List of towns in Alabama
