= Candice Renee Price =

American mathematician

- Born: California
- Education: University of Iowa
- Known for: DNA Topology
- Scientific career
- Fields: Mathematics
- Workplaces: Smith College
- Doctoral advisor: Isabel Darcy

Candice Renee Price is an African-American mathematician and co-founder of the website Mathematically Gifted & Black, which features the contributions of modern-day black mathematicians. She is an advocate for women and people of color in STEM.

== Research ==
Price's area of mathematical research is DNA topology.

== Career ==
Price obtained a bachelor's degree in mathematics from California State University, Chico in 2003, and a master's degree from San Francisco State University in 2007. She earned her doctoral degree in mathematics from the University of Iowa in 2012, under the advisement of Isabel Darcy.

She is currently an associate professor at Smith College. She was previously an assistant professor at the University of San Diego and at West Point (United States Military Academy).

Price is one of the founding organizers of the Underrepresented Students in Topology and Algebra Research Symposium (USTARS), an annual multi-day symposium started in 2011 that features the research of algebra and topology graduate students, as well as providing career and professional development opportunities.

In 2017, Price, along with Erica Graham, Raegan Higgins, and Shelby Wilson, started the website Mathematically Gifted & Black, which, coinciding with Black History Month, highlights the life and works of a modern-day Black mathematician every day in February.

== Awards and honors ==
Price was a 2013 MAA Project NExT fellow. For her work on Mathematically Gifted & Black, she was awarded the 2022 Presidential Recognition Award of the Association for Women in Mathematics (AWM). She was a 2024 recipient of the Deborah and Franklin Haimo Award for Distinguished College or University Teaching of Mathematics.

She co-delivered an invited plenary address at the 2021 National Math Festival. She delivered a Mathematical Association of America (MAA) invited lecture at MathFest 2021.
