= Candice Price =

Candice Price may refer to:

- Candice Renee Price, American mathematician
- Candice Davis Price (b. 1984), American hurdler
