= Juan Meza (disambiguation) =

Juan Meza may refer to:

- Juan Meza (1956 – 2023), a Mexican boxer
- Juan C. Meza, American mathematician
