= Shelly M. Jones =

American mathematian (born 1964)

- Born: November 2, 1964 (age 61)
- Occupation: Associate Professor
- Employer: Central Connecticut State University
- Notable work: Women Who Count: Honoring African American Women Mathematicians (2019)

Shelly Monica Jones (born November 2, 1964) is an American mathematics educator. She is an associate professor of mathematics education at Central Connecticut State University.

== Early life and education ==
Jones is African-American; she was raised in Bridgeport, Connecticut and went on to study computer science at Spelman College, graduating in 1986. Jones received a master's degree in mathematics education from the University of Bridgeport and a Ph.D. in mathematics education from Illinois State University.

== Career and research ==
Jones is an associate professor at Central Connecticut State University in New Britain, Connecticut. She teaches undergraduate and graduate content, curriculum, and methods courses. Her focus includes culturally relevant mathematics, where she explains cognitively demanding mathematics skills from a relevant cultural perspective. In addition, Jones's specialties include integrating elementary school mathematics and music, and the effects of college students’ attitudes and beliefs about mathematics on their success in college.

Jones' accomplishments have earned her recognition by Mathematically Gifted & Black as a Black History Month 2019 Honoree.

== Book ==
Jones is the author of the book Women Who Count: Honoring African American Women Mathematicians, published in 2019 by the American Mathematical Society.
