= Raymond L. Johnson =

African-American mathematician

Raymond Lewis Johnson
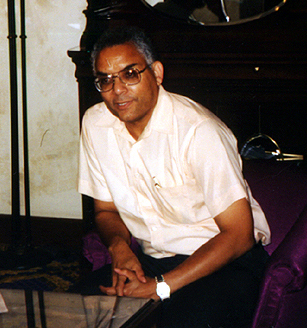
- Raymond L. Johnson in 1995
- Born: 25 June 1943 (age 83); Alice, Texas, US
- Education: University of Texas; Rice University
- Known for: 1st African-American student at Rice University; 1st African-American professor of mathematics at University of Maryland; Presidential Award for Excellence in Science, Mathematics and Engineering Mentoring (2015)
- Scientific career
- Fields: Mathematics
- Workplaces: University of Maryland; Howard University; Rice University
- Notable students: Kimberly Sellers

Raymond Lewis Johnson (born 1943) is an American mathematician, currently a professor emeritus at the University of Maryland, College Park and an adjunct professor of mathematics at Rice University. He was the first African-American student at Rice University, and the first African-American mathematics professor at the University of Maryland. His research concerns non-well-posed problems and harmonic analysis.

== Early life and education ==
Johnson was born on 25 June 1943 in Alice, Texas and educated in a small segregated schoolhouse, with children in four different grades in each of its two rooms. Because he had been taught by his grandfather how to read and do arithmetic, he skipped two grades of school. After the 1954 Brown v. Board of Education decision, desegregating public schools, he was allowed to attend the formerly-all-white secondary schools in Alice, beginning in the ninth grade. Shortly afterwards, the Soviet launch of Sputnik in 1957 and the ensuing Space Race led to the development of high school enrichment programs in science and mathematics, in which Johnson participated.

Johnson earned a National Merit Scholarship, which he used to attend the University of Texas at Austin. Johnson writes that he "decided to major in math because it was one of the things I had enjoyed most in high school and there was no hope of my really understanding physics." His high school mathematics teacher, Larry O'Rear, had been advised by mathematics professor Howard B. Curtis, and Curtis also became a mentor to Johnson, with much of his mathematical education accomplished through independent study advised by Curtis. Another role model at Texas was Vivienne Malone-Mayes, an African-American graduate student in mathematics and the grader for a linear algebra course taken by Johnson. However, Johnson was advised to avoid the courses of Robert Lee Moore, "the real head of the pure math department", who was famous for his mentorship of young mathematicians but also notorious for his racism.

On completing his undergraduate studies, Curtis suggested that Johnson continue as a graduate student at Rice University. Rice's founding charter was to serve only the white citizens of Texas, but the university had determined to break both its racial and its state-based restrictions. Johnson was admitted to Rice in 1963, as its first African-American student, but his admission was delayed until 1964 by a lawsuit against the university by two alumni who did not want this change to happen. Johnson worked at Rice for a year as a research associate before becoming a regular graduate student. He then discovered that he was being paid less than the other graduate students, and almost left again, but continued after obtaining an NSF graduate fellowship. At Rice, Johnson met his future wife, Claudette, then a sociology student at Texas Southern University, through their shared participation in protests during the Civil Rights Movement. He was advised by Jim Douglas, Jr., who moved to the University of Chicago after Johnson's first year of study. Johnson moved with him, but returned to Rice to defend his dissertation on Parabolic partial differential equations in 1969.

== Academic career ==
With the help of Douglas, Johnson obtained a position at the University of Maryland, College Park, where he became the first African-American mathematics professor. At Maryland, Johnson remained active in recruiting and retaining African-American students, especially from historically black colleges and universities. He served as a mentor to 23 doctoral students, most of them African-American and many of them female; an administrator at Maryland wrote of his work in this area that "the institutional success of our Department in educating underrepresented minorities has been based on the leadership of Ray Johnson". He remained at Maryland for 40 years (with a two-year interlude at Howard University from 1976 to 1978) until returning to Rice in 2007.

== Awards and honors ==
In 1986, the University of Maryland gave Johnson their Distinguished Minority Faculty Award. Johnson was the recipient of the 2006 Mentor Award for Lifetime Achievement of the American Association for the Advancement of Science. In 2015 he won the Presidential Award for Excellence in Science, Mathematics and Engineering Mentoring, given to 14 scholars nationally by the White House Office of Science and Technology Policy. Johnson's work earned him recognition by Mathematically Gifted & Black as a Black History Month 2017 Honoree.

Johnson was named a Fellow of the American Mathematical Society, in the 2022 class of fellows, "for contributions to classical harmonic analysis, and for efforts toward increasing the participation of African Americans in mathematics".
