= Melvin Currie =

American mathematician and cryptographer

- Born: 1948 (age 77–78); Pittsburgh
- Education: Yale University; University of Pittsburgh
- Scientific career
- Fields: Mathematics
- Doctoral advisor: William Fleissner

Melvin Robert Currie is an American mathematician and cryptographer and a former Chief of the Cryptographic Research and Design Division at the National Security Agency. His recognitions include a Lifetime Achievement Award from the National Association of Mathematicians, the 2007 Crypto-Mathematics Institute's Leadership Award, the NSA Director's Distinguished Service Medal, and recognition as a Black History Month 2019 Honoree by Mathematically Gifted & Black. He is the author of the 2018 popular mathematics book Mathematics: Rhyme and Reason, published jointly by the American Mathematical Society and the Mathematical Sciences Research Institute. Currie is also the author of the 2019 novel Just Before Too Late.

== Early life ==
Currie is African-American. He was born in Pittsburgh, Pennsylvania in 1948. His parents separated when he was six. Currie spent the rest of his childhood living with his mother, younger brother, and maternal grandparents.

His uncle is jazz musician Ahmad Jamal.

== Education ==
Currie received a BA from Yale University, where he majored in mathematics and economics. He went to graduate school at the University of Pittsburgh. He received his PhD in mathematics in 1983; his advisor was William Fleissner, and the title of his dissertation was A metric characterization of the irrationals via a group operation.
