= Ricardo Cortez (mathematician) =

American mathematician

Ricardo Cortez is an American mathematician and currently the Pendergraft William Larkin Duren Professor at Tulane University.

== Professional career ==
Ricardo Cortez earned a BS in mechanical engineering in 1986 and a BA in applied mathematics in 1988 from Arizona State University. In 1995, he earned his applied mathematics PhD from the University of California at Berkeley. He was an instructor at the Courant Institute of Mathematical Sciences, which is New York University's mathematics research school, from 1995 to 1998. Since 1998 he has been: Assistant Professor, Mathematics Department, Tulane University (1998–2001), Associate Professor, Mathematics Department, Tulane University 2001–2007. As of 2007 he is a professor, Mathematics Department, at Tulane University.

== Awards and honors ==
Cortez was awarded the Blackwell-Tapia Prize in 2012. He was named to the 2021 class of fellows of the American Mathematical Society "for contributions in numerical methods for fluid dynamics and leadership in promoting opportunities in mathematical sciences for underrepresented groups".
