= Kasso Okoudjou =

Beninese-American mathematician

- Born: Kasso Akochayé Okoudjou
- Education: University of Abomey-Calavi (Maîtrise); Georgia Institute of Technology (PhD)
- Awards: Sigma Xi Best PhD Thesis Award; MLK Visiting Professor, MIT (2018); Fellow, American Mathematical Society (2024)
- Scientific career
- Workplaces: Cornell University; Erwin Schrödinger International Institute for Mathematical Physics; University of Maryland, College Park; Massachusetts Institute of Technology; Tufts University
- Thesis: Characterization of function spaces and boundedness of bilinear pseudodifferential operators through Gabor frames (2003)
- Doctoral advisor: Christopher Edward Heil
- Website: okoudjou.com

Kasso Akochayé Okoudjou is a Beninese-American mathematician and Professor of Mathematics at Tufts University. His research spans harmonic analysis, time–frequency analysis, and fractals, with particular focus on frame theory and its applications to signal processing and quantum information. He is a Fellow of the American Mathematical Society and served as the 2018 Martin Luther King Visiting professor at the Massachusetts Institute of Technology.

== Education ==
Okoudjou studied mathematics at the University of Abomey-Calavi in Benin, earning a maîtrise in 1996. After graduating, he worked as an instructor at the Complexe Scolaire William Ponty de Porto-Novo. In 1998 he began graduate studies at the Georgia Institute of Technology, where he earned his PhD in 2003 with a dissertation on the characterization of function spaces and bilinear pseudodifferential operators through Gabor frames, supervised by Christopher Edward Heil. His thesis received the Sigma Xi Best PhD Thesis Award.

== Career ==
After completing his doctorate, Okoudjou was appointed H. C. Wang Assistant Professor at Cornell University in 2003. He spent 2005 at the Erwin Schrödinger International Institute for Mathematical Physics in Vienna, then joined the University of Maryland, College Park in 2006. He served as the Martin Luther King Visiting professor at MIT from 2017 to 2019, and moved to Tufts University in 2020, where he is Professor of Mathematics.

== Research ==
Okoudjou's research centers on harmonic analysis, time–frequency analysis, and fractal geometry. A major strand of his work involves frame theory, which concerns redundant representations of data. He has applied frame-theoretic methods to problems in digital signal processing and quantum information, with conditional results drawing on the Zauner conjecture and the Heil–Ramanathan–Topiwala conjecture. In 2018, he received a National Science Foundation grant to study finite Gabor systems and related conjectures.

=== Books ===
- Okoudjou, Kasso A. (2016). Finite Frame Theory: A Complete Introduction to Overcompleteness. Proceedings of Symposia in Applied Mathematics. ISBN 9781470420192.

== Service and advocacy ==
In June 2020, Okoudjou was appointed co-chair of the American Mathematical Society task force on racial discrimination, established in the wake of a nationwide reckoning on racial justice in the United States. The task force published its report, "Towards a Fully Inclusive Mathematics Profession," in March 2021.

== Awards and honors ==
- Sigma Xi Best PhD Thesis Award (2003)
- Martin Luther King Visiting professor, Massachusetts Institute of Technology (2018)
- Mathematically Gifted & Black Black History Month Honoree (2019)
- Fellow, American Mathematical Society (2024)
