= Ruthmae Sears =

American mathematics educator

Ruthmae Sears is a Bahamian-American mathematics educator, focusing on systemic inequities that impede student understanding of mathematics. She is an associate professor for secondary mathematics education in the University of South Florida College of Education.

== Education and career ==
Sears is originally from the Bahamas, and studied mathematics, statistics, and secondary mathematics at the College of the Bahamas, earning associate of arts and bachelor of education degrees there. She has a master's degree in mathematics education from Indiana University Bloomington, and a Ph.D. from the University of Missouri.

She has taught high school mathematics in the Bahamas, and became an assistant professor at the University of South Florida in 2012, earning tenure as an associate professor in 2018. She is also a member of the board of directors of Pace Bahamas, an educational foundation in the Bahamas.

== Recognition ==
The Florida Association of Mathematics Teacher Educators named Sears as their 2016 Mathematics Teacher Educator of the Year. Sears was named to the 2021 class of Fellows of the American Association for the Advancement of Science, becoming the first Black faculty member at the University of South Florida to win this honor. In 2023, Ruthmae Sears had been honored in Black History Month by Mathematically Gifted & Black.
