= Scarlett Bellamy =

American public health researcher

Scarlett L. Bellamy
- Born: North Carolina
- Education: Harvard T.H. Chan School of Public Health; Hampton University
- Scientific career
- Workplaces: Harvard University; Drexel University; Boston University School of Public Health
- Thesis: Clustered data methods with applications to community-based research (2001)

Scarlett Bellamy joined the Boston University School of Public Health in 2023 as Chair and Professor of Biostatistics.

== Early life and education ==
Bellamy was born in a rural town in North Carolina. She was raised by her grandparents. Her father's parents worked as farmers and her mother's mother worked in a hospital cafeteria. On the farm, Bellamy was involved with the summer harvest of tobacco, and learned to drive a tractor at the age of five. Bellamy spent her summer holidays taking part in a mathematics summer camp at North Carolina Central University. She was an undergraduate student at Hampton University, where she studied mathematics and graduated summa cum laude. She moved to Harvard University for graduate studies, where she focused on biostatistics. Bellamy completed her doctoral research at the Harvard T.H. Chan School of Public Health, supervised by Louise M. Ryan, where she made use of clustered data methods for community-based research. After graduating she worked as a statistical consultant for various organisations, including working on the East Boston Asthma Study.

== Research and career ==
Bellamy was appointed to the faculty at the Perelman School of Medicine at the University of Pennsylvania in 2001. She was eventually promoted to Professor of Biostatistics. In 2016, Bellamy joined Drexel University as a Professor of Biostatistics and Director of the biostatistics graduate program. Her research considers the efficacy of interventions in longitudinal behavioural modification trials. In particular, she has focused on HIV/AIDS, cardiovascular disease and healthy living.

Bellamy was elected a Fellow of the American Statistical Association in 2016. Bellamy was made President of the North American region in the International Biometric Society in 2017. She joined the adjunct faculty at the Harvard T.H. Chan School of Public Health in 2021, where she was responsible for providing career mentorship for people from historically marginalized groups.

Bellamy joined the Boston University School of Public Health on July 1, 2023 as Chair and Professor of Biostatistics. She was honored by Mathematically Gifted & Black in 2024 when she was added to their "Circle of Excellence."

== Selected publications ==
- Mark E Mikkelsen; Andrea N Miltiades; David F Gaieski; Munish Goyal; Barry D Fuchs; Chirag V Shah; Scarlett L Bellamy; Jason D Christie (1 May 2009). "Serum lactate is associated with mortality in severe sepsis independent of organ failure and shock". Critical Care Medicine. 37 (5): 1670–1677. doi:10.1097/ccm.0b013e31819fcf68. ISSN 0090-3493. PMID 19325467. Wikidata Q46072670.
- Mark E Mikkelsen; Jason D Christie; Paul N Lanken; et al. (6 April 2012). "The adult respiratory distress syndrome cognitive outcomes study: long-term neuropsychological function in survivors of acute lung injury". American Journal of Respiratory and Critical Care Medicine. 185 (12): 1307–1315. doi:10.1164/rccm.201111-2025oc. ISSN 1073-449X. PMC 3381234. PMID 22492988. Wikidata Q34267280.
- Joshua M Diamond; James C Lee; Steven M Kawut; et al. (10 January 2013). "Clinical risk factors for primary graft dysfunction after lung transplantation". American Journal of Respiratory and Critical Care Medicine. 187 (5): 527–534. doi:10.1164/rccm.201210-1865oc. ISSN 1073-449X. PMC 3733407. PMID 23306540. Wikidata Q37070008.
