= Rodrigo Bañuelos =

American mathematician

Rodrigo Bañuelos is an American mathematician and a professor of mathematics at Purdue University in West Lafayette, Indiana. His research is in probability and its applications to harmonic analysis and spectral theory.

== Early life, education, and career ==
Bañuelos was born in La Masita in the state of Zacatecas, Mexico. When he was 15, Bañuelos, his mother, grandmother, and six siblings moved to Pasadena, California. In 1978, Bañuelos received a B.A. in mathematics from the University of California, Santa Cruz. In 1980, he received a M.A.T. in mathematics with a California High School Teaching Credential form the University of California, Davis. In 1984, Bañuelos was awarded a Ph.D. in mathematics by the University of California, Los Angeles. He wrote his dissertation "Martingale Transforms, Related Singular Integrals, and AP-Weights" under the supervision of Richard Timothy Durrett.

According to MathSciNet, Bañuelos has authored or co-authored 102 articles in mathematical journals and books, which appeared in various journals.

Bañuelos has served on several editorial boards, including the Annals of Probability, Transactions of the AMS, Probability and Mathematical Statistics, Revista Matemática Iberoamericana, Latin American Journal of Probability and Mathematical Statistics, Potential Analysis, Annals of Probability and the Latin American Journal of Probability and Mathematical Statistics. He has served on numerous committees of the AMS.

== Book ==
Rodrigo Bañuelos and Charles N. Moore, Probabilistic Behavior of Harmonic Functions, Birkhäuser, 1999, ISBN 978-3-0348-8728-1.

== Honors and awards ==
- 1984–1986 Bantrell Research Fellow at California Institute of Technology
- 1986–1989 National Science Foundation (NSF) Postdoctoral Fellow at University of Illinois at Urbana-Champaign and Purdue University
- 1989–1994 NSF Presidential Young Investigator
- 2000 Elected Fellow of the Institute of Mathematical Statistics
- 2004 Blackwell-Tapia Prize in Mathematics
- 2009 Outstanding Latino Award, Purdue Latino Faculty and Staff Association
- 2013 Elected Fellow of the American Mathematical Society
- 2017 Elected Fellow of the Association for Women in Mathematics in the inaugural class
- 2018 Martin Luther King Jr. Dreamer Award, Purdue University
- 2022 AMS Award for Distinguished Public Service
- 2023 Class of SIAM Fellows
