= Arlie Petters =

Belizean-American mathematical physicist

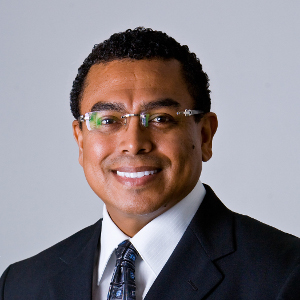
- Born: Arlie Oswald Petters; February 8, 1964 (age 62); Dangriga, Belize (formerly Stann Creek Town, British Honduras)
- Education: Hunter College; Massachusetts Institute of Technology
- Known for: Mathematical theory of gravitational lensing
- Awards: Alfred P. Sloan Fellowship; NSF CAREER Award; Blackwell-Tapia Prize; Most Excellent Order of the British Empire
- Scientific career
- Doctoral advisors: Bertram Kostant; David Spergel

Arlie Oswald Petters, MBE (born February 8, 1964) is a Belizean-American mathematical physicist, who is the Benjamin Powell Professor of mathematics and a professor of physics and economics at Duke University. Petters became the provost at New York University Abu Dhabi effective September 1, 2020. Petters's research is focused on problems connected to the interplay of gravity and light and employing tools from astrophysics, cosmology, general relativity, high energy physics, differential geometry, singularities, and probability theory. His monograph "Singularity Theory and Gravitational Lensing" developed a mathematical theory of gravitational lensing. Petters was also the dean of academic affairs for Trinity College of Arts and Sciences and associate vice provost for undergraduate education at Duke University (2016-2019).

== Biography ==
Petters was raised by his grandparents in the rural community of Dangriga, Belize (formerly Stann Creek Town, British Honduras). His mother immigrated to Brooklyn, New York, and married a U.S. citizen, with Arlie joining them when he was 14 years old.

Petters earned a B.A./M.A. in Mathematics and Physics from Hunter College, CUNY in 1986 with a thesis on "The Mathematical Theory of General Relativity", and began his Ph.D. at the Massachusetts Institute of Technology Department of Mathematics in the same year. After two years of doctoral studies, he became an exchange scholar in the Princeton University Department of Physics in absentia from MIT. Petters earned his Ph.D. in mathematics in 1991 under advisors Bertram Kostant (MIT) and David Spergel (Princeton University). He remained at MIT for two years as an instructor of pure mathematics (1991–1993) and then joined the faculty at Princeton University in the Department of Mathematics. He was an assistant professor at Princeton for five years (1993–1998) before moving to Duke University.

Many media outlets have profiled Arlie Petters and his scholarship, including The New York Times, NOVA, The HistoryMakers (a digital archive of oral histories featuring African-Americans and preserved at the Library of Congress), Big Think, and Duke University's news outlet, The Chronicle.

== Research ==
Petters is known for his work in the mathematical theory of gravitational lensing.

Over the ten-year period from 1991 to 2001, Petters systematically developed a mathematical theory of weak-deflection gravitational lensing, beginning with his 1991 MIT Ph.D. thesis on "Singularities in Gravitational Microlensing". In a series of papers, he and his collaborators resolved an array of theoretical problems in weak-deflection gravitational lensing covering image counting, fixed-point images, image magnification, image time delays, local geometry of caustics, global geometry of caustics, wavefronts, caustic surfaces, and caustic surfing. His work culminated in book, entitled Singularity Theory and Gravitational Lensing (Springer 2012), which he co-authored with Harold Levine and Joachim Wambganns. This book, which addressed the question, "What is the universe made of?", systematically created a framework of stability and genericity for k-plane gravitational lensing. The book drew upon powerful tools from the theory of singularities and put the subject of weak-deflection k-plane gravitational lensing on a rigorous and unified mathematical foundation.

Following his 1991–2001 body of mathematical lensing work, Petters turned to more astrophysical lensing issues from 2002 to 2005. In collaboration with astronomers, he applied some of the mathematical theory in [AP13] to help develop a practical diagnostic test for the presence of dark substructures in galaxies lensing quasars; classify the local astrometric (centroid) and photometric curves of an extended source when it crosses fold and cusp caustics due to generic lenses; predict the quantitative astrometric curve's shape produced by Galactic binary lenses. The classified local properties of the astrometric curves revealed a characteristic S-shape for fold crossings, parabolic and swallowtail features for cusp crossings, and a jump discontinuity for crossings over the fold arcs merging into a cusp. Petters, Levine, and Wambgamnns also developed a formula to calculate the size of the jump.

During the period from 2005 to 2007, Petters collaborated with astronomers and physicists to explore gravitational lensing in directions beyond its traditional confines in astronomy. In a series of three mathematical physics papers published written with the astronomer Charles R. Keeton, he utilized higher-order gravitational lensing effects by compact bodies to test different theories of gravity with the general theory of relativity of Einstein among them. These papers computed beyond the standard weak-deflection limit the first- and second-order corrections to the image positions, magnifications, and time delays due to lensing in general relativity and alternative gravitational theories describable within the PPN formalism, and even determined lensing invariants for the PPN family of models. Their findings were applied to the Galactic black hole, binary pulsars, and gravitational microlensing scenarios to make testable predictions about lensed images and their time delays. Another paper took on the difficult issue of how to test hyperspace models like braneworld gravity that postulate an extra dimension to physical space. The paper developed a semi-classical wave theory of braneworld black hole lensing and used that theory along with braneworld cosmology to predict a testable signature of microscopic braneworld black holes on gamma-ray light. Additionally, in a 2007 paper, Petters and M.C. Werner found a system of equations that can be applied to test the Cosmic Censorship Hypothesis observationally using the realistic case of lensing by a Kerr black hole.

Petters's previous work (1991–2007) dealt with non-random gravitational lensing. Starting in 2008, his research program focused on developing a mathematical theory of random (stochastic) gravitational lensing. In two papers, Petters, Rider, and Teguia took first steps in creating a mathematical theory of stochastic gravitational microlensing. They characterized to several asymptotic orders the probability densities of random time delay functions, lensing maps, and shear maps in stochastic microlensing and determined a Kac-Rice type formula for the global expected number of images due to a general stochastic lens system. The work forms a concrete framework from which extensions to more general random maps can be made. In two additional papers, he and Aazami found geometric universal magnification invariants of higher-order caustics occurring in lensing and caustics produced by generic general maps up to codimension five. The invariants hold with a probability of 1 for random lenses and thereby form important consistency checks for research on random image magnifications of sources near stable caustics.

== Social outreach ==
Petters has served as director of the Reginaldo Howard Memorial Scholarship program at Duke University. He has also been active in the African-American community particularly through his mentoring, recruiting, and lecturing. He has received several community service awards for his social outreach. Petters is the first tenured African-American professor in mathematics at Duke University. He is very involved in the Belizean community and founded the Petters Research Institute in 2005 to help train Belizean young people in STEM fields and foster STEM entrepreneurship. He has written five books, three of them science and mathematics problem-solving books for Belizean students. Some of his entrepreneurial work was conducted while he was a professor of business administration at Duke's Fuqua School of Business (2008–2017). Petters also served the Government of Belize as chairman of the Council of Science Advisers to the prime minister of Belize (2010–2013).

== Awards and honors ==
Petters has received numerous awards and honors. He was won an Alfred P. Sloan Research Fellowship in Mathematics (1998), and a CAREER award from the National Science Foundation (1998), and was the first winner of the Blackwell-Tapia Prize (2002). He was selected in 2006 by the National Academy of Sciences to be part of a permanent Portrait Collection of Outstanding African-Americans in Science, Engineering, and Medicine. In 2008 Petters was also included among the Human Relations Associates' list of "The Twenty-Five Greatest Scientists of African Ancestry,"going back to the eighteenth century. He received an honorary Doctor of Science from his alma mater, Hunter College, in 2008. Petters was named by the Queen of the United Kingdom in 2008 to membership in the Most Excellent Order of the British Empire. In recognition of his scientific accomplishments and service to society, Petters's birthplace—Dangriga, Belize—honored him in 2009 by naming a road Dr. Arlie Petters Street. He became in 2011 the first Belizean to receive the Caribbean American Heritage Award for Excellence in Science and Technology. In 2012 he became a fellow of the American Mathematical Society and the first Belizean American to be Grand Marshal of the Central American Day Parade in Los Angeles, where he received honors from the mayor and from the Confederation Centroamericana (COFECA). Petters was recognized by Mathematically Gifted & Black as a Black History Month 2017 Honoree.
