= Keisha Cook =

- Born: Marietta, Georgia
- Education: University of Alabama
- Known for: Stochastic and Nonlinear Dynamics
- Scientific career
- Fields: Applied Mathematics Computational Biology
- Workplaces: University of Alabama Clemson University Tulane University
- Doctoral advisor: Rodger B. Sidje

Keisha Cook is an assistant professor for the School of Mathematical and Statistical Sciences at Clemson University.

== Biography ==
Cook was born in the suburbs just outside Marietta, Georgia. After receiving her Bachelor of Science from the University of Alabama for applied mathematics she then began work on her Masters of Arts, which she completed in 2016.

== Education and research ==
Cook received her Ph.D. in 2019 for Applied Mathematics and Computational Biology at the University of Alabama under the supervision of Rodger B. Sidje; her thesis concerned parallel stochastic simulation of biochemical reaction systems. She held a postdoctoral position jointly at Tulane University and the Southeast Center for Mathematics and Biology.

== Awards and honors ==
In 2021 Cook was a part of a team that received a $3,799 grant to fund their Math for All conference. Later the same year a $49,951 for the annual Math for All conference was granted to the same team. In 2022 Dr. Cook received a grant from the Clemson University research fellows for $150,000.

Cook has been invited to many talks including a two part talk series at the University of Alabama in 2020, and a collaborative AWM and AMS meeting in 2021.

In 2022 Cook was awarded a Mathematically Gifted & Black SIAM Early Career Fellowship.

In 2024, Cook was named a Gilliam Advisor to Gilliam Fellow Jakini Kauba. They were one of 50 mentor/student pairs taking part in a prestigious program recognizing outstanding advisor/graduate student partnerships organized by the Howard Hughes Medical Institute.

== Selected publications ==
- Beckman, Erin; Cook, Keisha; Eikmeier, Nicole; Hernandez-Torres, Sarai; Junge, Matthew (2021), "Chase-escape with death on trees", The Annals of Probability, 49 (5): 2530–2547, arXiv:1909.01722, doi:10.1214/21-AOP1514.
- Rayens, Nathan; Cook, Keisha; McKinley, Scott; Payne, Christine (2022), "Transport of lysosomes decreases in the perinuclear region: Insights from changepoint analysis", Biophysical Journal, 121 (7): 1205–1218, Bibcode:2022BpJ...121.1205R, doi:10.1016/j.bpj.2022.02.032, PMC 9034247, PMID 35202608.
- Scott, Sherry; Cook, Keisha; Barley, Kamal (2021). "Post-lockdown Dynamics of COVID-19 in New York, Florida, Arizona, and Wisconsin". medRxiv 10.1101/2020.12.28.20248967..
