= Mark E. Lewis (engineer) =

American engineer (born 1970)

- Born: 1970 (age 55–56); Niceville, Florida
- Education: Eckerd College (BS & BA, 1992); Florida State University (MS, 1995); Georgia Tech (PhD, 1998)
- Scientific career
- Fields: Industrial engineering
- Workplaces: Cornell University (since 2005); University of Michigan (1999-2005)
- Thesis: Bias Optimality in a Two-Class Nonstationary Queueing System (1998)

Mark Edwin Lewis (born 1970) is an American industrial engineer and professor at Cornell University. He was the first African-American faculty member hired in Industrial Engineering at University of Michigan and the first tenured African-American faculty member at the School of Operations Research and Information Engineering at Cornell University. Lewis' research is focused on stochastic processes, and queueing theory and Markov decision processes in particular.

== Education ==
Lewis received a BS degree in mathematics and a BA degree in political science at Eckerd College, graduating in 1992. He proceeded to earn an MS degree in theoretical statistics from Florida State University in 1995 and a PhD degree in industrial and systems engineering from Georgia Tech in 1998. Lewis' PhD thesis Bias Optimality in a Two-Class Nonstationary Queueing System at Georgia Tech was advised by Robert E. Foley.

== Career ==
After his PhD, Lewis spent a year at the University of British Columbia as a postdoctoral fellow. In 1999, he joined the faculty at the University of Michigan in Ann Arbor as assistant professor of Industrial and Operations Engineering. Lewis became associate professor at the Operations Research and Information Engineering department at Cornell University in 2005 and was promoted to Full Professor in 2011.

Lewis founded the Institute for Operations Research and the Management Sciences (INFORMS) Minority Issues Forum in 2001 and served as its first president. In 2009, Lewis co-chaired the 15th INFORMS Applied Probability Conference at Cornell University in Ithaca, NY. Lewis acted as chair of the Applied Probability Society from 2012 to 2014. In 2024, Lewis was elected to be the 2025 INFORMS President-elect and subsequently the 2026 President of INFORMS.

Lewis was Associate Dean for Diversity and Faculty Development for Cornell University's College of Engineering from 2015 to 2020. In this role, he acted as task force chair of the Faculty Diversity Committee, which was convened in 2017. Lewis served as principal investigator on the Cornell University Engineering Success Program to increase the participation of underrepresented minority and first-generation college students.

== Research ==
Lewis researches the optimal control of non-stationary systems, developing policies for admission and pricing at non-stationary queueing systems with finite capacity and multiple customer classes, with applications in production, communication, and the airline industry.

He studied the dynamic control and optimal resource allocation of service systems, such as call centers, through "upgrades, reneging, and retrials" (for example after market segmentation).

Lewis also develops methods for optimization of Markov decision processes to study problems such as inventory control and revenue management.

== Awards and honors ==
- 1998: NSF NATO Postdoctoral Fellowship
- 1999: Facilitating Academic Careers in Engineering and Science (FACES) award, Georgia Tech
- 1999: Honorable Mention for George B. Dantzig Dissertation Award, Institute for Operations Research and the Management Sciences
- 2002: NSF CAREER
- 2003: Mentor of the Year, Sloan Foundation
- 2004: Harold R. Johnson Diversity Service Award, University of Michigan
- 2005: NSF Presidential Early Career Award for Scientists and Engineers
- 2010: J. J. Ebers Award "for contributions to widely used silicon integrated circuit process modeling"
- 2014: MAA-NAM Blackwell Lecture
- 2019: Mathematically Gifted & Black 2019 Black History Month Honoree
- 2021: INFORMS Fellow
- 2021: INFORMS Minority Issues Forum Fellow
- 2024: INFORMS Senior Member
