= Frederick Palmer Whiddon =

First president of the University of South Alabama

Frederick Palmer Whiddon (March 2, 1930 - May 1, 2002) was the founder and long-time president of the University of South Alabama, the first four-year state-supported university in Mobile, Alabama.

Whiddon was born in Newville, Alabama. He was a graduate of Birmingham-Southern College (B.A., 1952) and Emory University (Ph.D., 1963). He held the position of dean of students at Athens State College in Athens, Alabama, when he took the job as director of the University of Alabama's extension service in Mobile. Whiddon then spearheaded the drive to create an autonomous new university in Mobile. That university was officially begun in 1963 and taught its first classes in 1964.

Whiddon's 35-year tenure as the president of the University of South Alabama was marked by dramatic growth. The university came to comprise nine colleges and schools. One of those, the College of Medicine, opened in 1972 as the state's second medical school and re-established Mobile as a center of physician training in Alabama, a position it held as a monopoly until the early 20th century, when Alabama's original medical school (located in Mobile) closed.

Whiddon also founded the University of South Alabama Foundation to support the university's mission. The foundation amassed a huge endowment by the 1990s, primarily by depositing federal and state reimbursements to the university for medical services performed at its hospitals. After this technique became the subject of a lawsuit, the university and the USA Foundation agreed to spend the medical reimbursements only for medical-related purposes and to refrain from further diversion of medical reimbursements into the foundation.

Whiddon resigned as president of the University of South Alabama in 1998 under pressure from the university's board of trustees. He was succeeded by his long-time vice-president for services and planning, V. Gordon Moulton. Whiddon then became managing director of the USA Foundation. Under Whiddon the foundation was forced into protracted legal squabbling with the university over control of the foundation's assets and the timing and purposes for which they were being disbursed. A lawsuit was settled out-of-court in 2001; the settlement required the foundation to add new members to its board, including the president of the University of South Alabama, but it did not require the foundation to alter its asset allocation, management, or disbursements.

Whiddon died in Mobile on May 1, 2002.

== Sources ==
- "Dr. Fred Whiddon of Newville", Henry County Tidings, Vol. IV, No. 41, by T. Larry Smith
- "South Alabama founder Fred Whiddon dies", Birmingham Business Journal, May 1, 2002
- "Facts about the agreement," Mobile Press-Register, August 12, 2001
- "Settlement made on USA lawsuit," Mobile Press-Register, August 11, 2001, by Bill Barrow
- "New chapter for USA to start today; University board expected to accept founding President Fred Whiddon's resignation this afternoon, launch search for replacement," Mobile Press-Register, July 29, 1998, by Ronni Patriquin Clark
- "Long-Time President of U. of South Alabama Resigns to Avoid Being Fired," Chronicle of Higher Education, July 31, 1998, by Julianne Basinger
- "Frederick Palmer Whiddon, Ph.D., D.Litt", Alabama Health Care Hall of Fame Honorees

Preceded by N/A	President; University of South Alabama; 1963–1998	Succeeded by V. Gordon Moulton
