= Nathan Alexander =

Math professor

- Education: University of North Carolina at Chapel Hill; Teachers College, Columbia University
- Scientific career
- Fields: Mathematics
- Workplaces: New York University; Morehouse College

Nathan Alexander is the James King, Jr. Visiting Professor of Mathematics Teaching at Morehouse College. Alexander is also Associate Director of the James King, Jr. Institute for Student and Faculty Engagement "Communicating by Thinking Effectively in and About Mathematics" (Communicating TEAMs). As of 2017, he is on leave from his faculty position as Assistant Professor of Mathematics and Statistics Education at the University of San Francisco.

== Education ==
Alexander grew up in Charlotte, North Carolina, and has worked as a teacher in Harlem. In college, he worked as a teaching assistant in mathematics, as well as with the Upward Bound program.

Alexander obtained his bachelor's degree at University of North Carolina at Chapel Hill in 2007, where he double majored in mathematics and sociology, and his MA in teaching mathematics at New York University. He earned his MS, MPhil, and PhD in mathematics and education at Columbia University, graduating in 2015 under the supervision of Erica N. Walker.

== Research and career ==
Alexander's specialties lie in mathematics education, statistical and mathematical modeling, and social networks and graphs. He has published on developments in teaching for social justice.

In March 2019, Alexander held his student's baby in class, the news of which was tweeted by a student, and was picked up by numerous national and international news media.

Alexander is a Black History Month 2020 Honoree, awarded by Mathematically Gifted & Black.
