= Richard Murnane =

American educator

Richard J. Murnane
- Born: 1945 (age 80–81)
- Education: Yale University
- Scientific career
- Fields: Economics
- Thesis: The Impact of School Resources on the Learning of Inner City Children (1974)
- Doctoral advisor: Guy Orcutt; John M. Quigley
- Doctoral students: Erica N. Walker

Richard John Murnane (born 1945) is an economist and the Juliana W. and William Foss Thompson Professor of Education and Society at the Harvard Graduate School of Education.

He has made important contributions to our understanding of education policy and the relationship between the economy and education. He has published numerous peer-reviewed articles and coauthored a number of books. His research has investigated what skills are required to earn a middle-class living in the U.S., the significance of the GED, and teacher quality. Murnane earned his Ph.D. at Yale University and is a winner of the Morningstar Family Teaching Award.

== Selected publications ==
- The New Division of Labor: How Computers are Creating the Next Job Market, (with F. Levy) (2004)
- "Can the Internet Help Solve America's Education Problems: Lessons from the Cisco Networking Academies," (with N. Sharkey and F. Levy) in The Knowledge Economy and Postsecondary Education, (ed. by P. Graham and N. Stacey) (2002)
- "Information Technology and Skill Requirements: Examples from a Car Dealership," (with A. Beamish and F. Levy) in The Future of Computer Supported Diagnosis (ed. by F. Rauner, N. Schreier, and G. Sp'ttl) (2002)
- "Upstairs, Downstairs: Computers and Skills on Two Floors of a Large Bank," in Industrial and Labor Relations Review (with D. Autor and F. Levy) (2002)
- "Do Cognitive Skills of School Dropouts Matter in the Labor Market?" in Journal of Human Resources (with J.H. Tyler and J.B. Willett) (2001)
- "From High School to Teaching: Many Steps. Who Makes It?" in Teachers College Record (with E. Vegas and J.B. Willett) (2001)
- "Key Competencies Critical to Economic Success," (with F. Levy) in Defining and Selecting Key Competencies (ed. by D. Rychen and L. Salganik) (2001)
- "Will Standards-Based Educational Reforms Improve Education for Children of Color?" in National Tax Journal (with F. Levy) (2001)
- "Estimating the Labor Market Signaling Value of the GED" in Quarterly Journal of Economics (with J.H. Tyler and J.B. Willett) (2000)
- "Who Benefits from Obtaining a GED? Evidence from High School and Beyond," in The Review of Economics and Statistics (with J.B. Willett and J.H. Tyler) (2000)
- "Does A GED Lead to More Training, Post-Secondary Education, and Military Service for School Dropouts" in Industrial and Labor Relations Review (with J.B. Willett and K. Parker Boudett) (1997)
- Teaching the New Basic Skills (with F. Levy) (1996)
- Who Will Teach? Policies That Matter (with J. Singer and J. Willett) (1991)
