= Aissa Wade =

Senegalese mathematician

- Born: Dakar
- Education: University of Montpellier; Cheikh Anta Diop University
- Scientific career
- Workplaces: University of Waterloo
- Thesis: Normalization for Poisson structures
- Doctoral advisor: Jean Paul Dufour

Aissa Wade is a professor of Mathematics at the Pennsylvania State University. She was the President of the African Institute for Mathematical Sciences centre in Senegal (from 2016 to 2018).

== Early life and education ==
Wade was born in Dakar, Senegal. She studied mathematics at Cheikh Anta Diop University and graduated in 1993. She had to leave Senegal to earn a Ph.D. as there were no opportunities in Africa. Wade earned her Ph.D. at the University of Montpellier in 1996. Her thesis, "Normalisation formelle de structures de Poisson", considered symplectic geometry. Her doctoral advisor was Jean Paul Dufour.

== Career ==
Wade became a postdoctoral researcher at the Abdus Salam International Centre for Theoretical Physics, where she worked on conformal Dirac structures. She held visiting faculty positions at University of North Carolina at Chapel Hill, African University of Science and Technology and Paul Sabatier University. Wade joined Pennsylvania State University and was appointed full professor in 2016.

She served as a managing editor of The African Diaspora Journal of Mathematics. She is editor of Afrika Mathematika. She is on the scientific committee of the NextEinstein forum, an initiative to connect science, society and policy in Africa. As the President of the African Institute for Mathematical Sciences, Wade was the first woman to hold this role. She has been awarded funding from the National Science Foundation to support the Senegal Workshop on Geometric Structures. She has been involved with American Association for the Advancement of Science activities to enhance African STEM research, including the provision of evidence-based metrics, case studies and policy recommendations. In 2017 Wade was named a fellow of the African Academy of Sciences.

Wade's accomplishments earned her recognition by Mathematically Gifted & Black, where she was featured as a Black History Month 2020 Honoree.
