= Mariel Vázquez =

Mexican mathematical biologist (born 1971/1972)

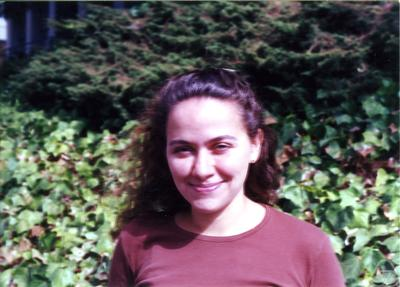
- Born: February 24, 1971
- Died: July 5, 2026 (aged 55)
- Education: Florida State University
- Known for: Research in DNA topology
- Awards: Association for Women in Mathematics Fellow (2017); Blackwell-Tapia Prize (2016); Dorothy Wrinch Memorial Lecture in Biomathematics, Four College Biomath Consortium (2015); CAMPOS Faculty Scholar, UC Davis (2014); Mohammed Dahleh Distinguished Lectureship at UC Santa Barbara (2014); NIH Grant (2013); Presidential Early Career Award for Scientists and Engineers (2012); National Science Foundation CAREER Award (2011)
- Scientific career
- Fields: Mathematics, Biology
- Workplaces: University of California, Davis
- Doctoral advisor: De Witt Sumners

Mariel Vázquez (February 24, 1971 - July 5, 2026) was a Mexican mathematical biologist who specialized in the topology of DNA. She was a professor at the University of California, Davis, jointly affiliated with the departments of mathematics and of microbiology and molecular genetics.

== Education ==
Vázquez received her Bachelor of Science in Mathematics from the National Autonomous University of Mexico in 1995. She received her Ph.D. in mathematics from Florida State University in 2000. Her dissertation was entitled Tangle Analysis of Site-specific Recombination: Gin and Xer Systems and her advisor was De Witt Sumners.

== Career ==
Vázquez was a postdoctoral fellow at the University of California, Berkeley from 2000 to 2005, where she researched mathematical and biophysical models of DNA repair in human cells with Rainer Sachs as part of the mathematical radiobiology group. She was a faculty member in the mathematics department at San Francisco State University from 2005 to 2014. In 2014, she joined the faculty at the University of California, Davis as a CAMPOS scholar.

== Awards and honors ==
In 2011, Vázquez received a National Science Foundation CAREER Award to research topological mechanisms of DNA unlinking. In 2012, she was the first San Francisco State University faculty member to receive the Presidential Early Career Award for Scientists and Engineers. She received a grant for computer analysis of DNA unknotting from the National Institutes of Health in 2013. In 2016, she was chosen for the Blackwell-Tapia prize, which is awarded every other year to a mathematician who has made significant research contributions in their field, and who has worked to address the problem of under-representation of minority groups in mathematics. She was selected for the inaugural class of Association for Women in Mathematics fellows in 2017. She was elected a Fellow of the American Mathematical Society in the 2020 class "for contributions in research and outreach at the interface of topology and molecular biology, and for service to the mathematical community in particular to underrepresented groups." In 2023, Vázquez was elected a Fellow of the American Association for the Advancement of Science.
