= Floyd Williams =

American mathematician (born 1939)

Floyd Leroy Williams (born September 20, 1939) is a North American mathematician well known for his work in Lie theory and, most recently, mathematical physics. In addition to Lie theory, his research interests are in homological algebra and the mathematics of quantum mechanics. He received his B.S.(1962) in Mathematics from Lincoln University of Missouri, and later his M.S.(1965) and Ph.D.(1972) from Washington University in St. Louis. Williams was appointed professor of mathematics at the University of Massachusetts Amherst in 1984, and has been professor emeritus since 2005. Williams' accomplishments earned him recognition by Mathematically Gifted & Black as a Black History Month 2019 Honoree.

== Biographical Sketch ==
Floyd Williams was born on September 20, 1939, and lived in Kansas City, Missouri. He was raised in extreme poverty. His mother told him not to complain about their situation, but rather to have faith in God and work hard. Her advice was taken, and it worked. He eventually was ordained in addition to being a mathematician.

However, it was music, not mathematics, that appealed to him through high school. "In fact," he admits, "mathematics was the only course in which I did not do well." Williams had not thought of going to college until his last week in high school when he was offered a music scholarship at Lincoln University of Missouri in Jefferson City, Missouri.

It was in his sophomore year that he became intrigued by the theory of relativity, which turned out to be his main motivation for studying mathematics. In 1972 he completed his Ph.D. from Washington University where his thesis was in the field of Lie theory. He was an instructor and lecturer at MIT from 1972 to 1975, before moving to the University of Massachusetts Amherst as an assistant professor in 1975. In 1983 he received an MRI grant to continuing researching in this field, ushering him into the mainstream of mathematics.

As an African-American in a field that has had little minority representation, Williams has felt the sting of discrimination during his career. However, he has been a motivation and role model for many young minorities, encouraging them to enter science and engineering. Williams has helped to set up programs that allow pre-college students and undergraduates to meet and talk with mathematicians, scientists and engineers, most notably at a summer camp run at MIT. "All that many of these youngsters see is different courses," he says, "but they want to know what mathematicians do from 8 am to 5 pm. Once minorities commit to graduate work in science or engineering," he continues, "they need extra help and support for what, for many, is the foreign environment of graduate school. Such programs exist at few universities, but we need more of them."

In 2012 he became a fellow of the American Mathematical Society.

== Mathematics ==
Williams' recent contribution to quantum mechanics has been in the area of Nikiforov-Uvarov theory of generalized hypergeometric differential equation, used to solve the Schrödinger equation and to obtain the quantization of energies from a single unified point of view. This theory is developed and is also used to give a uniform approach to the theory of special functions. This study furthers to connect the modern studies of pure mathematics with physics.

== Bibliography ==
Notable works of Floyd Williams include:

- Floyd L. Williams. Topics in Quantum Mechanisms, (Progress in Mathematical Physics, Birkhauser, 2003)
- Floyd L. Williams. Lectures on the spectrum of $L^2(\Gamma \backslash G)$, (John Wiley & Sons, Inc., New York, 1991)
- Andrei A. Bytsenko and Floyd L. Williams (Editors). Mathematical Methods in Physics, (Proceedings of the 1999 Londrina Winter School, World Scientific Pub., 2000)
- Floyd L. Williams. Tensor products of principal series representations: Representations of complex semisimple Lie groups, (Lecture Notes in Mathematics, Vol. 358. Springer-Verlag, Berlin-New York, 1973)

He had written over 88 written papers, including four books. Moreover, Floyd L. Williams has been cited 157 times by over 150 authors. Here is a list of some of his most cited works

1. Kaneyuki, Soji; Williams, Floyd L.Almost paracontact and parahodge structures on manifolds. Nagoya Math. J. 99 (1985), 173–187.
2. Williams, Floyd L. Tensor products of principal series representations. Reduction of tensor products of principal series. Representations of complex semisimple Lie groups. Lecture Notes in Mathematics, Vol. 358. Springer-Verlag, Berlin-New York, 1973. vi+132 pp.
3. Perry, Peter A.; Williams, Floyd L. Selberg zeta function and trace formula for the BTZ black hole. Int. J. Pure Appl. Math. 9 (2003), no. 1, 1–21. 11M41
4. Williams, Floyd L. The n-cohomology of limits of discrete series. J. Funct. Anal. 80 (1988), no. 2, 451–461.
5. Lectures on the spectrum of L2(Γ\G). Pitman Research Notes in Mathematics Series, 242. Longman Scientific & Technical, Harlow; copublished in the United States with John Wiley & Sons, Inc., New York, 1991. xiv+348 pp. ISBN 0-582-06863-0
6. Bytsenko, A. A.; Williams, F. L. Asymptotics of the heat kernel on rank-1 locally symmetric spaces. J. Phys. A 32 (1999), no. 31, 5773–5779.
7. Williams, Floyd L. The cohomology of semisimple Lie algebras with coefficients in a Verma module. Trans. Amer. Math. Soc. 240 (1978), 115–127.
8. Fischer, Hans R.; Williams, Floyd L. The Borel spectral sequence: some remarks and applications. Differential geometry, calculus of variations, and their applications, 255–266, Lecture Notes in Pure and Appl. Math., 100, Dekker, New York, 1985.
9. Williams, F. L. A zeta function for the BTZ black hole. Proceedings of the Second International Winter School on Mathematical Methods in Physics (Londrina, 2002). Internat. J. Modern Phys. A 18 (2003), no. 12, 2205–2209.
10. Bytsenko, A. A.; Guimarães, M. E. X.; Williams, F. L. Remarks on the spectrum and truncated heat kernel of the BTZ black hole. Lett. Math. Phys. 79 (2007), no. 2, 203–211. 58J90
