= Monica Cox =

Engineer

Monica F. Cox
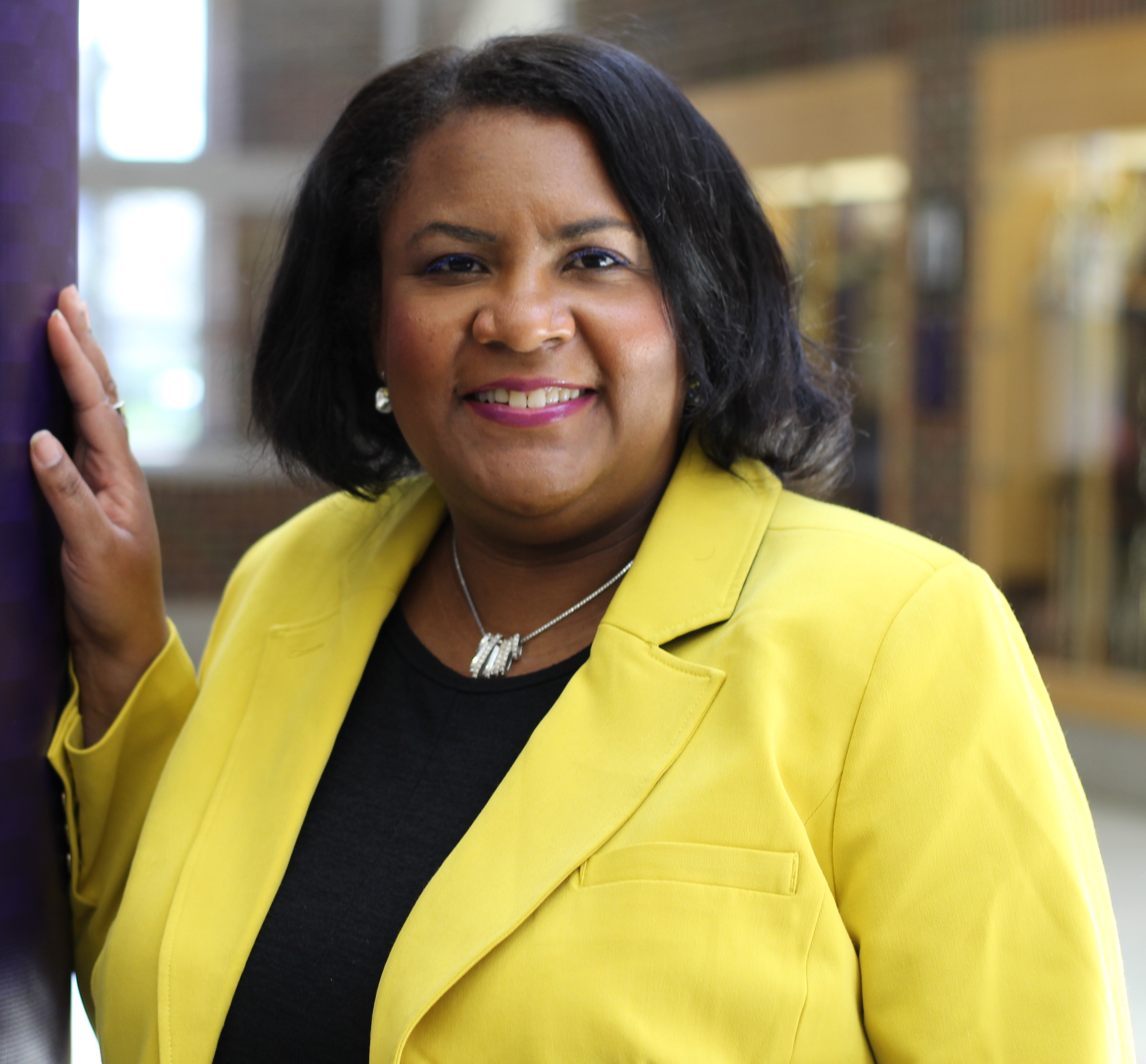
- Spouse: Ishbah Cox
- Awards: Presidential Early Career Award for Scientists and Engineers

Academic background
- Education: Spelman College; University of Alabama; Peabody College, Vanderbilt University
- Thesis: An examination of the validity of the VaNTH Observation System (2005)

Academic work
- Discipline: Engineering education
- Institutions: Ohio State University; Purdue University

Monica Farmer Cox is a professor of engineering education at Ohio State University. Cox was the first African-American woman to earn tenure in engineering at Purdue University. She won the 2008 Presidential Early Career Award for Scientists and Engineers.

== Early life ==
Cox was born in Fort Gaines, Georgia, and grew up in Shorterville, Alabama and Newville, Alabama. As a child she studied a computer science class in community college. She was awarded a full scholarship to attend Spelman College. She graduated cum laude from Spelman College with a degree in mathematics. She took part in a NASA Women in Science and Engineering program led by Etta Zuber Falconer. During her undergraduate studies, Cox worked at Marshall Space Flight Center. When she graduated from Spelman College she was sponsored by NASA to research in the International Space Station ground payload operations team. She earned a master's degree at University of Alabama and a PhD in leadership and policy studies from Peabody College at Vanderbilt University.

== Research and career ==
In 2011 Cox became the first African-American woman to earn tenure in the College of Engineering at Purdue University. She was invited to join Michelle Obama at the White House to serve on a panel on workplace flexibility. At Purdue University she became Director of the International Institute of Engineering Education Assessment. She established STEMinent LLC in 2013, a platform that permits consistent and unbiased faculty performance assessment. Whilst at Purdue University she won several awards, including the Faculty Award of Excellent for Leadership, Black Graduate Student Association Engagement Award and a National Science Foundation Career Award.

Cox was named as the Chair of the Department of Engineering Education at Ohio State University in 2015. She is the first African-American woman to be a Full Professor in the College of Engineering at Ohio State University. She serves as Principal Investigator of a $1.4 million National Science Foundation grant for her project "Why We Persist: An Intersectional Study to Characterize and Examine the Experiences of Women Tenure-Track Faculty in Engineering". The project will use existing databases for institutional analysis, develop a national survey and conduct interviews with women of colour. She published Excellence: Why Being Average is Never an Option in 2018.

== Awards and recognition ==
She won the Presidential Early Career Award for Scientists and Engineers in 2008. Her research explores the participation of women of color in engineering and develops assessment tools for use across engineering education. She was also recognized by Mathematically Gifted & Black as a Black History Month 2018 Honoree.

== Selected publications ==
- Cox, Monica. Demystifying the Engineering PhD. Elsevier Science & Technology, Saint Louis, 2019, doi:10.1016/C2014-0-00153-0.
- Besterfield-Sacre, Mary, et al. "Changing Engineering Education: Views of U.S. Faculty, Chairs, and Deans." Journal of Engineering Education (Washington, D.C.), vol. 103, no. 2, 2014, pp. 193–219
- Main, Joyce B., et al. "Trends in the Underrepresentation of Women of Color Faculty in Engineering (2005–2018)." Journal of Diversity in Higher Education, 2022.
