= Tasha Inniss =

American mathematician

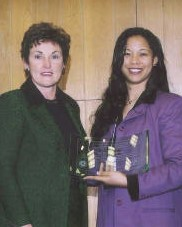
- Jane Garvey (left) presents Tasha Inniss with an FAA Student-of-the-Year award in 2002
- Education: Xavier University of Louisiana; University of Maryland, College Park
- Scientific career
- Workplaces: Trinity Washington University; Spelman College
- Thesis: Stochastic Models for the Estimation of Airport Arrival Capacity Distributions (2000)

Tasha Rose Inniss is an American mathematician and the vice provost for research at Spelman College.

== Early life and education ==
Inniss was born in New Orleans and grew up without a father. She became interested in mathematics in fourth grade, and decided she would study it as a freshman in high school. She studied mathematics at Xavier University of Louisiana, graduating summa cum laude. In 1992 she was listed in the Who's Who Among Colleges and Universities for her academic achievements. She earned a master's degree in applied mathematics from Georgia Institute of Technology.

She moved to the University of Maryland for her PhD, funded by the David and Lucile Packard Foundation. In 2000, Inniss became the first African American woman to obtain a Ph.D. in mathematics from the University of Maryland, together with Sherry Scott and Kimberly Weems. Her dissertation was Stochastic Models for the Estimation of Airport Arrival Capacity Distributions. She was part of the National Center of Excellence for Aviation Operators and advised by Michael Owen Ball. Her brother, Enos Inniss, also completed his PhD in 2000.

== Research and career ==
In 2001 she was appointed the Clare Boothe Luce Professor of Mathematics at Trinity Washington University. Her doctoral thesis described programming methods to calibrate models to estimate airport capacity. She remains a consultant for the Federal Aviation Administration.

She joined the department of mathematics at Spelman College in 2005 as an assistant professor.

Throughout her career she has worked to recruit, support and mentor underrepresented minority students. She led a National Science Foundation project that looked to increase the quality and quantity of underrepresented minorities matriculating and completing doctoral degrees. She has contributed to the EDGE Foundation (Enhancing Diversity in Graduate Education) program.

In 2017 she joined the Institute for Operations Research and the Management Sciences as Director of Education.

Inniss' work earned her recognition by Mathematically Gifted & Black as a Black History Month 2017 Honoree.

In 2022, Inniss was added to the American Mathematical Society (AMS) Committee on Professional Ethics.
