= Carla Cotwright-Williams =

African-American mathematician

Carla Denise Cotwright-Williams
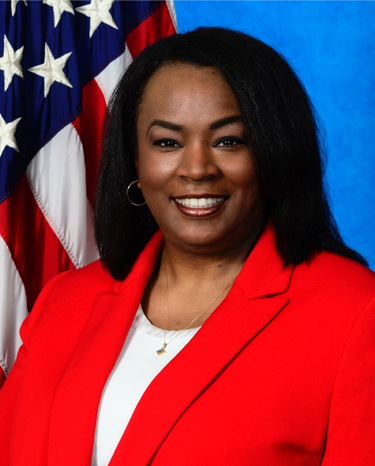
- Education: California State University, Long Beach; Southern University; University of Mississippi
- Scientific career
- Fields: Mathematician
- Workplaces: Department of Defense; American University
- Thesis: Clones and minors in matroids (2006)
- Doctoral advisor: T. James Reid

Carla Denise Cotwright-Williams is an American mathematician who works as a Technical Director and Data Scientist for the United States Department of Defense. She was the second African-American woman to earn a doctorate in mathematics at the University of Mississippi.

== Early life and educational ==
She is the daughter of a police officer and grew up in South Central Los Angeles. She went to Westchester High School and attended summer enrichment programs for underrepresented students there that included courses at the University of California, Los Angeles, and a field trip to see the Space Shuttle at NASA's Armstrong Flight Research Center on Edwards Air Force Base. She graduated in 1991.

As an undergraduate at California State University, Long Beach, Cotwright-Williams started in engineering. Then, as a math major, she struggled initially and earned low enough grades to be academically disqualified from the university, but worked hard to return as a student in good standing, eventually earning a bachelor's degree in mathematics in 2000. She then earned a master's degree in mathematics from Southern University in Baton Rouge, Louisiana, in 2002. Originally intending to follow a science & math Ph.D. track, she was persuaded to shift to pure mathematics under the mentorship of an African-American professor, Stella R. Ashford, who became the supervisor for her master's thesis in number theory, Unique Factorization in Bi-Quadratic Number Fields.

She went on to doctoral studies at the University of Mississippi, where she became president of the Graduate Student Council and earned a second master's degree there along the way in 2004. She completed her Ph.D. at the University of Mississippi in 2006. Her dissertation was supervised by T. James Reid and concerned matroid theory. She was the second African-American woman to earn a doctorate in mathematics at the university, and was part of a group of four African-Americans who all graduated in the same year.

== Career ==
After completing her doctorate, Cotwright-Williams worked as a tenure-track faculty member in mathematics at Wake Forest University, Hampton University, and Norfolk State University. While working there, in an effort to shift her career to a government track, she began studying public policy and working on collaborative research on Bayesian network based drone control systems with NASA, and on a US Navy project involving measurement uncertainty. In 2010, she completed a Graduate Certificate in Public Policy Analysis at Old Dominion University. She applied for an American Mathematical Society Congressional Fellowship, and was turned down on her first application but succeeded in her second, in 2012.

Cotwright-Williams also became a 2012–2013 Legislative Branch Fellow, under the American Association for the Advancement of Science Science and Technology Policy Fellowship program. She also worked as a science and technology Fellow for both the Senate and the House of Representatives. While a Congressional Fellow she worked as a staffer on the majority staff of the U.S. Senate Homeland Security and Governmental Affairs Committee and her responsibilities included responding to the Boston Marathon bombing in 2013. In 2014 she worked on data quality for United States Citizenship and Immigration Services, and in 2015 she became Hardy-Apfel IT Fellow at the Social Security Administration. Her work at the Social Security Administration has included business analytics to prevent fraud and support data warehousing. In 2018, with the fellowship expiring, she moved again to the United States Department of Defense as a data scientist.

Cotwright-Williams continues to hold an adjunct professorial lecturer position in mathematics and statistics at American University. She serves as an at-large member of the executive committee of the Association for Women in Mathematics (AWM).

Her career advice includes the following quote: "Get out and talk to people and learn new things!"

== Awards and honors ==
- Outside of Academia Member in the National Association of Mathematicians
- Black History Month 2017 Honoree, Mathematically Gifted & Black
