= Erica N. Walker =

American mathematician

- Born: c. 1971 (age 54–55)
- Education: Birmingham–Southern College; Wake Forest University; Harvard University
- Awards: AWM/MAA Falconer Lecturer 2015
- Scientific career
- Fields: Mathematics education
- Workplaces: Teachers College, Columbia University
- Thesis: On Time and Off Track?: Advanced Mathematics Course-Taking Among High School Students (2001)
- Doctoral advisor: Richard Murnane
- Doctoral students: Nathan Alexander

Erica Nicole Walker (born c. 1971) is an American mathematician and the Clifford Brewster Upton Professor of Mathematics Education at Teachers College, Columbia University, where she also serves as the Chairperson of the Department of Mathematics, Science, and Technology and as the Director of the Institute for Urban and Minority Education. Walker’s research focuses on the "social and cultural factors as well as educational policies and practices that facilitate mathematics engagement, learning and performance, especially for underserved students".

== Education ==
Walker is originally from Atlanta, Georgia, and began learning mathematics as a preschooler from a mathematics teacher who lived next door. As a high school student, Walker showed an aptitude for math. Encouraged by a teacher to take AP Calculus during her senior year, Walker found that "the calculus teacher was terrible....so we students all taught each other after class." She realized that she enjoyed teaching math to her friends. That experience led Walker to major in mathematics in college and begin her career teaching mathematics in public school.

Walker earned a B.S. (cum laude) in mathematics at Birmingham–Southern College. She obtained a Master of Education in Mathematics Education at Wake Forest University. After obtaining her graduate degree, Walker taught high school mathematics in Atlanta, Georgia. Her teaching experience and earlier observation of few African-American students in upper level math courses during college led to an interest in and intent to encourage more African-American students to take advanced math classes, as well as to the conference of several teaching awards.

Walker received her Doctor of Education from Harvard University's Graduate School of Education in 2001. At Harvard, she furthered her studies and research in the "experience of students of color in math classes." Her dissertation, "On Time and Off Track: Advanced Mathematics Course-Taking Among High School Students," examined the experience of high school students taking math classes. Specifically, who continues to upper level math, who stops, and why.

== Academic career ==
Walker was a postdoctoral fellow at Teachers College, Columbia University from 2001 to 2002.

She has been a faculty member at Teachers College since 2002. Her primary research interests are racial and gender equity in mathematics education, student persistence in advanced mathematics, and mathematics educational policy. She is the author of two books and has contributed to a number of scholarly journals.

In 2017, she became director of the Institute for Urban and Minority Education at Teachers College.

Recognized by the National Association of Mathematicians and the Association for Women in Mathematics for her scholarship and practice, Walker collaborates with teachers, schools, districts, organizations, and media outlets to promote mathematics excellence and equity for young people.

Walker's work has been published in journals such as the American Education Research Journal, the Journal for Research in Mathematics Education, Educational Leadership, and the Urban Review. Professor Walker also serves on several editorial boards.

== Awards and honors ==
Walker was the AWM/MAA Falconer Lecturer for 2015, speaking on "A Multiplicity All at Once: Mathematics for Everyone, Everywhere". In 2019, she was recognized by Mathematically Gifted & Black as a Black History Month 2019 Honoree.

== Selected publications ==
- Building Mathematics Learning Communities: Improving Outcomes in Urban High Schools. New York: Teachers College Press, 2012
- Beyond Banneker: Black Mathematicians and the Paths to Excellence. New York: State University of New York Press, 2015
- Getting to the Right Algebra: The Equity 2000 Initiative in Milwaukee Public Schools. MDRC Working Papers. (co-authored with Sandra Ham)
- Why Aren't More Minorities Taking Advanced Math?, Educational Leadership, Nov. 2007, Volume 65 - Making Math Count, pp. 48–53
