= Naiomi Cameron =

American-born mathematician

Naiomi Tuere Cameron is an American mathematician working in the field of combinatorics. She is a professor at Spelman College as well as the vice president of National Association of Mathematicians. She was previously an associate professor at Lewis & Clark College in Portland, OR.

Cameron was born in Washington, D.C. and raised in Providence, Rhode Island. She attended Howard University for her undergraduate and graduate school, receiving both her B.S. and PhD in Mathematics. In 2019, she was featured on Mathematically Gifted and Black as a Black History Month 2019 Honoree.

== Research ==
Cameron's academic work has been focused on enumerative and algebraic combinatorics and number theory. Her thesis for her dissertation in 2002 was Random Walks, Trees and Extensions of Riordan Group Techniques. Her other publications include:

- Cameron, Naiomi T.; Killpatrick, Kendra (2015-06-01). "Inversion polynomials for permutations avoiding consecutive patterns". Advances in Applied Mathematics. 67: 20–35. arXiv:1402.5211. doi:10.1016/j.aam.2015.03.002. ISSN 0196-8858.
- Cameron, Naiomi; Killpatrick, Kendra (2013-11-01). "Symmetry and Log-Concavity Results for Statistics on Fibonacci Tableaux". Annals of Combinatorics. 17 (4): 603–618. doi:10.1007/s00026-013-0198-1. ISSN 0219-3094. S2CID 121407867.

== Additional work ==
Cameron is the vice president of the National Association of Mathematicians for the 2019–2020 term.
