= Willie Tullis =

American football player (born 1958)

No. 20, 26, 42
- Position: Cornerback

Personal information
- Born: April 5, 1958 (age 68); Newville, Alabama, U.S.
- Listed height: 6 ft 0 in (1.83 m)
- Listed weight: 193 lb (88 kg)

Career information
- College: Troy State
- NFL draft: 1981: 8th round, 217th overall pick

Career history
- Houston Oilers (1981–1984); New Orleans Saints (1985–1986); Indianapolis Colts (1987–1988); Detroit Lions (1989)*
- * Offseason or practice squad member only

Awards and highlights
- Gulf South Offensive Player of the Year (1980); 2× First-team All-Gulf South (1979, 1980)

Career NFL statistics
- Interceptions: 18
- Fumble recoveries: 4
- Sacks: 1
- Touchdowns: 1
- Stats at Pro Football Reference

Willie James Tullis (born April 5, 1958) is an American former professional football player who was a defensive back for eight seasons in the National Football League (NFL). He played college football for the Troy Trojans. Tullis played in the NFL with the Houston Oilers (1981–1984), the New Orleans Saints (1985–1986) and the Indianapolis Colts (1987–1988).

Tullis attended Headland High School in Headland, Alabama, where he was a high school football star during the 1970s.
