= William A. Massey (mathematician) =

American mathematician

William A Massey
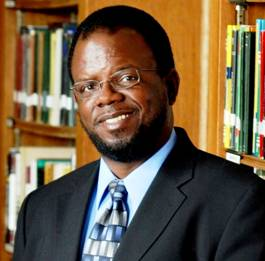
- Born: 1956 (age 68–69); Jefferson City, Missouri
- Occupation: Edwin S Wilsey Professor of Princeton University
- Parent(s): Juliete and Richard Massey

William Alfred Massey is an American mathematician and operations researcher, the Edwin S. Wilsey Professor of Operations Research and Financial Engineering at Princeton University. He is an expert in queueing theory.

== Biography ==
Massey was born in Jefferson City, Missouri in 1956, the son of Juliette and Richard Massey Sr., both educators. His family moved to St. Louis, Missouri when he was four. He went to college at Princeton University, graduating in 1977. Massey obtained his Ph.D. from Stanford University in 1981, with a thesis on queueing theory supervised by Joseph Keller. His first research publication was developed during a summer program at Bell Laboratories while he was a graduate student and was published in 1978. After earning his doctorate, he became a permanent staff member at Bell Labs. In 2001, Massey moved to his current position at Princeton, becoming the first African-American Princeton undergraduate alumnus to return as a faculty member.

== Awards and honors ==
In 2006, Massey won the Blackwell–Tapia Prize of the Institute for Mathematics and its Applications for his "outstanding record of achievement in mathematical research and his mentoring of minorities and women in the field of mathematics". He was elected to the 2006 class of Fellows of the Institute for Operations Research and the Management Sciences. In 2012 he became a fellow of the American Mathematical Society. Massey's accomplishments have earned him recognition by Mathematically Gifted & Black as a Black History Month 2018 Honoree.
