= Toka Diagana =

Mauritanian-American mathematician

- Born: December 27, 1967

Academic background
- Education: Tunis El Manar University; Claude Bernard University Lyon 1 (DEA, PhD)
- Alma mater: Claude Bernard University Lyon 1
- Thesis: Sum of Linear Operators and Kato-McIntosh's Conjecture

Academic work
- Discipline: Mathematics
- Sub-discipline: Differential equations Stochastic differential equations Operator theory
- Institutions: University of Alabama in Huntsville; Howard University

Toka Diagana (born December 27, 1967, also published as Tocka Diagana) is a Mauritanian-American mathematician, a professor of mathematics and chair of mathematics at the University of Alabama in Huntsville, and the editor-in-chief of the journal Nonautonomous Dynamical Systems. The topics of his research include functional analysis, stochastic processes, differential equations, dynamical systems, and operator theory.

== Education and career ==
Diagana is originally from Kaédi, in southern Mauritania, a country in Northwest Africa. After attending a top high school in Kaédi, he went north to Tunisia for undergraduate studies at the Faculté des sciences de Tunis of Tunis El Manar University. There, his interests in mathematical analysis and topology were sparked by Abdenabi Achour and Said Zarati. At the suggestion of Achour, he traveled to France for doctoral study in mathematics, at Claude Bernard University Lyon 1. He earned a diploma of advanced studies (master's degree) there in 1995, and completed his Ph.D. thesis, titled Sum of Linear Operators and Kato-McIntosh's Conjecture, in 1999, under the direction of Jean-Bernard Baillon. He also worked in Lyon with Étienne Ghys.

After a brief stint as a secondary school teacher in Thoissey, France, Diagana came to Howard University in the US as a lecturer in 2000, and obtained an assistant professorship there in 2002. He was quickly promoted to associate professor in 2004, and then to full professor in 2007. He moved to his present position as professor and chair at the University of Alabama in Huntsville in 2018.

== Contributions ==
Diagana founded the African Diaspora Journal of Mathematics, and is the editor-in-chief of the journal Nonautonomous Dynamical Systems. His 13 authored and edited books include both mathematical monographs and multiple compilations of mathematics from researchers of the African diaspora. Despite many academic publications, in a profile on Mathematically Gifted & Black, he describes his greatest accomplishment as his mentorship of eight African Americans to doctorates in mathematics, including two women, countering the historic underrepresentation of people from these groups in mathematics.

== Recognition ==
Diagana is a 2006 recipient of the Prix Chinguitt, a Mauritanian national prize given annually for excellence in science research. He is a Fellow of the African Academy of Sciences, elected in 2009.
