= Lawrence Udeigwe =

Nigerian-American mathematician and musician

UDEiGWE
- Born: Lawrence Udeigwe; Makurdi, Benue State, Nigeria
- Other names: UDEiGWE; Lorens Chuno
- Citizenship: Nigerian-American
- Education: Duquesne University (BS); University of Pittsburgh (MS, PhD)
- Occupations: Mathematician, professor, musician
- Years active: 2007–present
- Employer: Manhattan University
- Organization: Massachusetts Institute of Technology (Research Affiliate)
- Known for: Mathematics research; jazz and Afro-jazz music
- Title: Professor of Mathematics
- Website: udeigwe.net

Lawrence Udeigwe is a Nigerian-American jazz musician. He performs under the stage name UDEiGWE and was formerly known as Lorens Chuno. He is also a professor of mathematics.

Udeigwe's music incorporate elements of jazz and West African musical traditions and has received coverage in jazz publications and music media

== Early life and education ==
Udeigwe was born in Makurdi, Benue State, Nigeria. He moved to the United States in 2000. He earned undergraduate and graduate degrees in mathematics and computer science in the United States and completed a Ph.D. at the University of Pittsburgh in 2014.

== Career ==
=== Music ===
Udeigwe began performing music in the mid-2000s under the name Lorens Chuno and released his debut album, Highlife, Soul, & Ecstasy, in 2007. He later released My House (2013) under the same name.

He was listed among Nigerian EPs that received the most Streams and trended in Audiomack in 2018 to 2022.

His 2016 album Naija Rhythm Affair, NYC, released under the name Lorens Chuno, received a full-length review from All About Jazz, which examined the album’s fusion of West African rhythmic elements with contemporary jazz.

His album Rhythm Sustained (2018) was initially released under the stage name Lorens Chuno and was subsequently reissued under the name UDEiGWE.

In the 2020s, performing under the name UDEiGWE, he released several singles that were covered by Nigerian and international music media. His 2023 single Do, featuring Nigerian artist Skales, appeared on Apple Music editorial playlists.

Udeigwe has collaborated with musicians including Skales and the Sierra Leone Refugee All Stars, as well as jazz artists such as Poogie Bell and Geri Allen.

=== Academic Background ===
Udeigwe is a Professor of Mathematics at Manhattan University. He has also held a visiting appointment in Brain and Cognitive Sciences at the Massachusetts Institute of Technology (MIT). His academic work includes research in applied mathematics and computational approaches to neuroscience, and he has published in peer-reviewed journals

He is also the founder of LCM Cube, an indie label, and hosts "Doing Jazz," a Podcast where he chats about music and life.

In 2009, Udeigwe was appointed as a lecturer at Penn State Fayette. He was awarded a Dr. Martin Luther King Jr. Visiting Associate Professorship at the Massachusetts Institute of Technology. In 2020, Udeigwe was awarded a National Science Foundation Research Grant, and in 2021, he was awarded a Department of Defense research grant from the U.S. Army Combat Capabilities Development Command (DEVCOM).

== Discography ==
=== Albums ===
- Highlife, Soul and Ecstasy, in (2007)
- My House (2013)
- Naija Rhythm Affair, NYC (2016)
- Rhythm Sustained (2018)
- Live in Williamsburg (2026)
- Four Lemmas (2026)

== Singles ==
- "Today (Remix)" (2023)
- "Do" (feat. Skales) (2023)
- "Falling" (2024)

== Books and Journals ==
- "Emergent Dynamical Properties of the BCM Learning Rule." Journal of Mathematical Neuroscience. Vol 7:2, (2017), DOI: 10.1186/s13408-017-0044-6
- "Waves and patterns on regular graphs." SIAM Journal on Applied Dynamical Systems Vol. 14(2), 1102-1129, 2015. DOI: 10.1137/140969488
- Interfacing Music and Mathematics: A Case for More Engagement
- An Analysis of the Cluster-Detecting Property of the BCM Neuron

== Professional membership ==
He became a Fellow of the Advance HE, formerly known as the Higher Education Academy, in 2021. He is also a Fellow and Visiting Scholar at the Institute for Pure and Applied Mathematics (IPAM), Los Angeles, CA. He is a member of Sigma Xi, Organization for Computational Neuroscience, Mathematical Association of America a Society for Industrial and Applied Mathematics.

== Awards and recognition ==
He won the National Science Foundation CAREER Award in 2020, BCS Award for Excellence in Graduate Teaching at The Massachusetts Institute of Technology (MIT) and in 2021, he was awarded by Department of Defense research from the United States Army Research Laboratory. In 2023, He was awarded Yessiey Awards and named among the Black Honorees by the mathematically gifted black. In 2024, Apple Music named Udeigwe as one of Nigeria's rising artists to watch.
