= Jacqueline Hughes-Oliver =

Jamaican-born American statistician

- Born: Jamaica
- Education: University of Cincinnati North Carolina State University
- Scientific career
- Fields: Statistics
- Workplaces: North Carolina State University

Jacqueline Mindy-Mae Hughes-Oliver is a Jamaican-born American statistician, whose research interests include drug discovery and chemometrics. She is a retired professor of the Statistics Department of North Carolina State University (NCSU).

== Education and career ==
Hughes-Oliver was born in Jamaica, where she grew up and went to school, living with her grandmother there while her mother worked in the US, in Cincinnati. She became a US citizen at age 12, and moved to the US at age 15. She graduated magna cum laude in mathematics from the University of Cincinnati in 1986, and earned her PhD in statistics at NCSU in 1991, becoming possibly the first African-American doctorate from her department. Her dissertation, entitled "Estimation using group-testing procedures: adaptive iteration", supervised by William H. Swallow, concerned adaptive group testing.

After taking a temporary position at the University of Wisconsin at Madison, Hughes-Oliver returned to NCSU as a faculty member in 1992. At NCSU, she directed the Exploratory Center for Cheminformatics Research, a large research group that she founded in 2005 with a large grant from the National Institutes of Health, and directed the graduate program in statistics beginning in 2007. She has also worked as a professor of statistics at George Mason University from 2011 to 2014, but kept her position at NCSU and returned to it.

== Awards and honors ==
In 2007 Hughes-Oliver was elected as a Fellow of the American Statistical Association. She is the 2014 winner of the Blackwell-Tapia prize, awarded both for her contributions to the methodology and applications of statistics and also for her efforts to increase the diversity of the mathematical sciences. Her work also earned her recognition by Mathematically Gifted & Black as a Black History Month 2017 Honoree. She was elected to the 2022 class of Fellows of the American Association for the Advancement of Science (AAAS).
