= Nagambal Shah =

American mathematician

Nagambal D. "Swarna" Shah is an American mathematician and statistician known for her mentorship of students at Spelman College. She is the founder of the annual StatFest of the American Statistical Association, a leader of the association's Diversity Mentoring Program, and the former chair of the association's Committee on Minorities in Statistics.

== Education and career ==
Shah is originally from India, where she did her undergraduate studies in mathematics and earned a master's degree in statistics. She completed a Ph.D. in statistics in 1970 at the University of Windsor in Canada.

She joined the Spelman College mathematics department in 1972, and retired to become a professor emerita in 2014.

== Recognition ==
In 2001, the Rollins School of Public Health of Emory University gave Shah their Martin Luther King Jr. Community Service Award. Shah was named a Fellow of the American Statistical Association in 2010. The National Association of Mathematicians gave her their Lifetime Achievement Award in 2017.. The American Association for the Advancement of Science gave her their Lifetime Mentor Award in 2023..
