= Joint Mathematics Meetings =

Annual mathematics conference hosted by the MAA and the AMS

The Joint Mathematics Meetings (JMM) is a mathematics conference hosted annually in early January by the American Mathematical Society (AMS). Frequently, several other national mathematics organizations also participate. From 1998 to 2020, the JMM was jointly organized and managed by the AMS and the Mathematical Association of America (MAA).

The meeting is the largest gathering of mathematicians in the United States, and the largest annual meeting of mathematicians in the world. For example, more than 6000 people attended the 2017 JMM. Several thousand talks, panels, minicourses, and poster sessions are held each year.

The JMM also hosts an Employment Center, which is a focal point for the hiring process of academic mathematicians, especially for liberal arts colleges. Many employers conduct their preliminary interview process at the meeting. Often these interviews take place outside the confines of the conference, so the employers may not appear on the official Employment Center listing.

== Future meetings ==
The next few meetings are scheduled to be held in:

- Chicago, IL, January 12–15, 2027
- Philadelphia, PA, January 5–8, 2028
- Phoenix, AZ, January 3–6, 2029
- 2030 location to be determined
- Denver, CO, January 5–8, 2031

== Past meetings ==
Past years' meetings have been held in:

- Washington, D.C., January 4–7, 2026
- Seattle, WA, January 8–11, 2025 link
- San Francisco, CA, January 3–6, 2024 link
- Boston, MA, January 4–7, 2023 link
- Virtual, April 6–9, 2022 (the originally scheduled meeting in Seattle, WA, January 5–8, had been postponed due to concerns about the Omicron variant of COVID-19) link
- Virtual, January 6–9, 2021 (the originally scheduled in-person meeting in Washington, D.C. was canceled due to COVID-19) link
- Denver, CO, January 15–18, 2020 link
- Baltimore, MD, January 16–19, 2019 link
- San Diego, CA, January 10-13, 2018 link
- Atlanta, GA, January 4–7, 2017 link
- Seattle, WA, January 6–9, 2016, link
- San Antonio, TX, January 10–13, 2015, link
- Baltimore, MD, January 15–18, 2014 link
- San Diego, CA, January 9–12, 2013 link
- Boston, MA, January 4–7, 2012 link
- New Orleans, LA, January 6–9, 2011 link
- San Francisco, CA, January 13–16, 2010 link
- Washington, D.C., January 5–8, 2009 link
- San Diego, CA, January 6–9, 2008 link
- New Orleans, LA, January 5–8, 2007 link
- San Antonio, TX, January 12–15, 2006 link
- Atlanta, GA, January 5–8, 2005 link
- Phoenix, AZ, January 7–10, 2004 link
- Baltimore, MD, January 15–18, 2003 link
- San Diego, CA, January 6–9, 2002 link
- New Orleans, LA, January 10–13, 2001 link
- Washington, D.C., January 19–22, 2000 link

== Gallery ==
People At the joint Mathematic Meeting

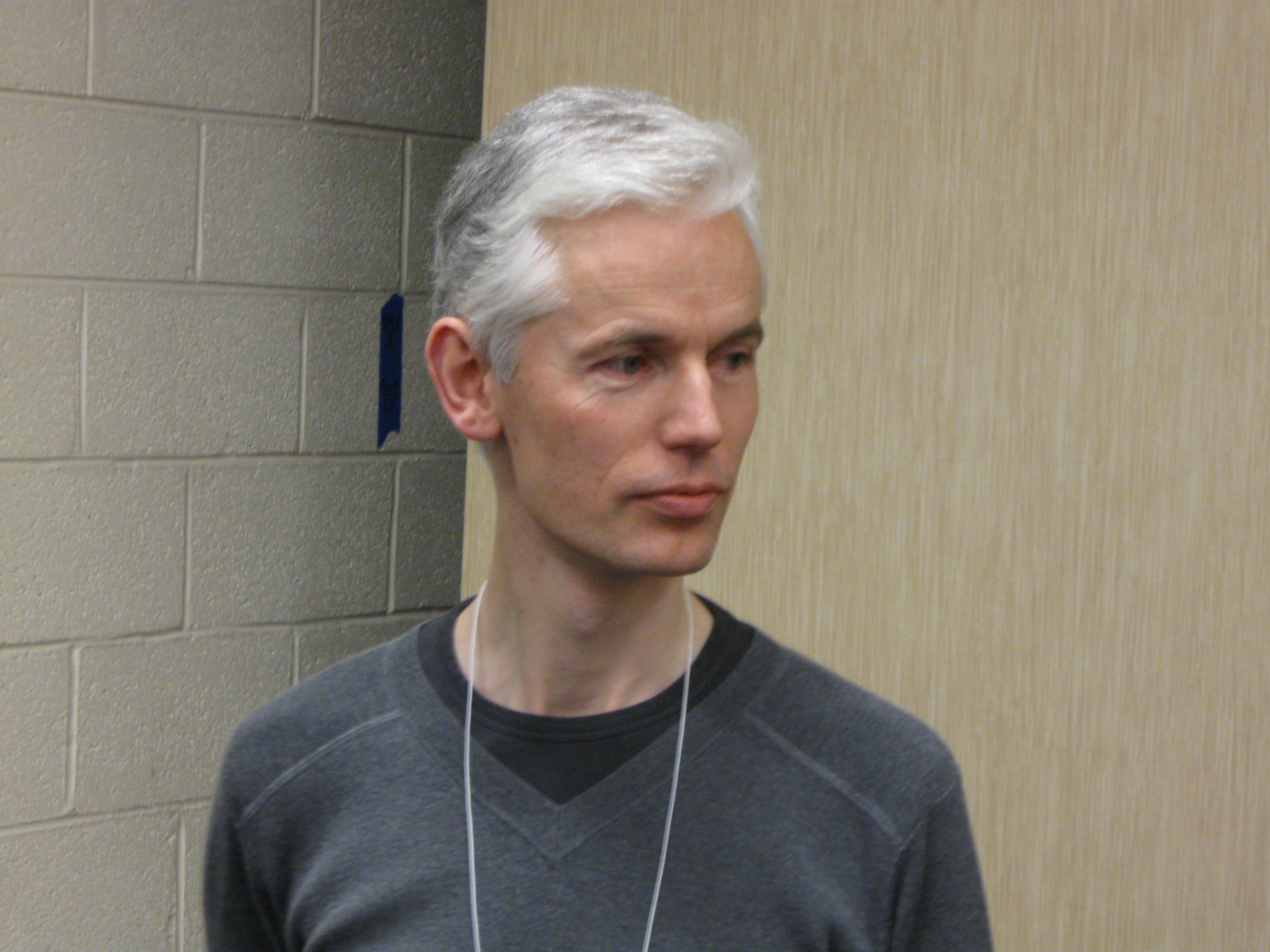

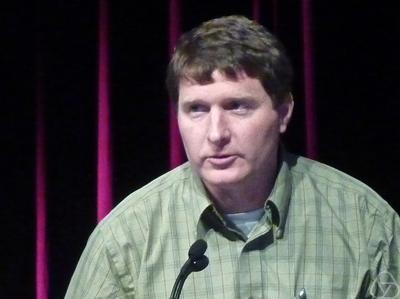

== See also ==
- MathFest
- Gathering 4 Gardner
- International Congress of Mathematicians
