= Juan C. Meza =

American mathematician

- Born: Houston, Texas, U.S.
- Education: Ph.D., M.A., Computational and Applied Mathematics; B.S, M.S., Electrical Engineering
- Alma mater: Rice University
- Awards: Blackwell-Tapia Prize, SACNAS Distinguished Scientist Award, Gordon Bell Prize, Richard Tapia Achievement Award
- Scientific career
- Fields: Electrical engineering, Computational and applied mathematics
- Workplaces: UC Merced; Lawrence Berkeley National Laboratory
- Thesis: Conjugate Residual Methods for Almost Symmetric Linear Systems (1986)
- Website: https://www.juancmeza.com/

Juan C. Meza is an American mathematician, electrical engineer, and university professor. He is recognized for his contributions to computational mathematics, high-performance computing, and his advocacy for equity and representation in STEM fields.

Meza is currently a Professor of Applied Mathematics at University of California, Merced (UC Merced) and the Associate Director for the Simons Laufer Mathematical Sciences Institute. He had previously served as the Dean of the School of Natural Sciences at the UC Merced (2011-2017).

He is received numerous awards and has served on several prestigious scientific and computational mathematics boards and commissions. At the federal level, he served on advisory committees for the National Research Council, the Department of Energy (DOE), and the National Science Foundation (NSF).

== Education ==
Meza attained all his degrees exclusively from Rice University. He earned his B.S. in electrical engineering in 1978 and, in 1979, a M.S. in the same field. He was conferred a PhD, M.A. in 1986 in Computational and Applied Mathematics from the same university. His doctoral advisor was William Woodbury Symes.

== Career ==
In his career, Meza made an impression in the world of math, technology, and science. Earlier in his life, Meza worked in the Sandia National Laboratories, where he served as a Distinguished Member of the Technical Staff, a recognition only a few had received before him. Later as the chief scientist at the Lawrence Berkeley National Laboratory, he also became the head of computational research in the field of mathematics. Meza later joined the University of California, Merced as a professor in applied mathematics and became a dean of the School of Natural Sciences. In this role, Meza focused on improving the School of Natural Science's accessibility to marginalized people of color, promoting equity and inclusion in the fields of computational science and hiring diverse faculty to honor representation.

== Awards and recognition ==
Meza won the Blackwell Tapia Award for his exceptional services in computational and applied mathematics in 2008 for earnestly promoting participation and contribution from scientists and mathematicians from marginalized communities of color. He also received recognition as the Top 100 Influential in the Hispanic Business magazine. To honor Meza's contribution towards the success of underrepresented and marginalized students, he was conferred the Society for Advancement of Chicanos and Native Americans in Science (SACNAS) Distinguished Scientist Award. He also received the Gordon Bell Prize in 2008 and in 2022, Meza was awarded the Richard Tapia Achievement Award for Scientific Scholarship, Civic Science, and Diversifying Computing for his advocacy for equity and diversity in computational mathematics and science. The conference theme was " A Time to Celebrate Resilience, Adaptability, and Innovation in Computing." His other awards include the Rice University Outstanding Engineering Alumni Award.

== Committees ==
In his career, Meza has served on several boards and commissions. Some include the National Research Council Board on Mathematical Sciences and Their Applications, National Partnership for Advanced Computational Infrastructure, and the Human Resources Advisory Committee for the Mathematical Sciences Research Institute. He has also sat on a board of governors for the Institute for Mathematics and its Applications.

== Selected publications ==
- Meza, J. C. (2010). Steepest Descent. https://doi.org/10.2172/983240
- Willems, T. F., Rycroft, C. H., Kazi, M., Meza, J. C., & Haranczyk, M. (2012). Algorithms and tools for high-throughput geometry-based analysis of crystalline porous materials. Microporous and Mesoporous Materials, 149(1), 134–141. https://doi.org/10.1016/j.micromeso.2011.08.020
- Yang, C., Meza, J. C., Lee, B., & Wang, L.-W. (2009). KSSOLV—a matlab toolbox for solving the kohn-sham equations. ACM Transactions on Mathematical Software, 36(2), 1–35. https://doi.org/10.1145/1499096.1499099
