= University of South Alabama =

Public university in Mobile, Alabama, US

Coordinates: 30.69671°N 88.17873°W

- Motto: "Research, Teaching, Service"
- Type: Public research university
- Established: May 3, 1963; 63 years ago
- Accreditation: SACS
- Academic affiliations: ORAU; Sea-grant; Space-grant
- Endowment: $742.1 million (total for both of USA's endowments 2025)
- President: Jo Bonner
- Administrative staff: 992
- Students: 13,768 (fall 2023)
- Undergraduates: 8,913 (fall 2023)
- Postgraduates: 3,598 (fall 2023)
- Doctoral students: 1,256 (fall 2023)
- Other students: 1 (fall 2023)
- Location: Mobile, Alabama, United States
- Campus: 1,224 acres (495 ha); Midsize city
- Other campuses: Dauphin Island; Fairhope; Gulf Shores
- Newspaper: The Vanguard (member of the combined student media group Jag Media)
- Colors: Blue, white, and red
- Nickname: Jaguars
- Sporting affiliations: NCAA Division I FBS – Sun Belt
- Mascots: South Paw; Miss Pawla
- Website: www.southalabama.edu

The University of South Alabama (USA) is a public research university in Mobile, Alabama, United States. It was created by the Alabama Legislature in May 1963, and replaced the existing extension programs operated by the University of Alabama. The first classes were held in June 1964 with an enrollment of 276 students; the first commencement was held in June 1967.

The University of South Alabama is divided into ten colleges and schools that include one of Alabama's two state-supported medical schools. In the fall semester of 2018, South Alabama had an enrollment of 15,093 students. By the spring of 2019, the university had awarded over 90,000 degrees. It is classified among "R2: Doctoral Universities – High research activity". The university claims to have an annual economic impact of $3 billion.

== History ==
=== Founding ===
The University of South Alabama was founded in 1963 as an integrated institution to provide public higher education to the Gulf Coast region. Classes began in June 1964 with 276 students, and the first graduation was in 1967. Frederick Palmer Whiddon served as founding president. The University of South Alabama College of Medicine was formed in 1969 following the exit of the Medical College of Alabama to Birmingham, Alabama, in 1920.

=== 21st-century developments ===
USA now has 11 colleges and schools and continues to expand in research and healthcare. Football and other athletic programs have grown, including the opening of Hancock Whitney Stadium in 2022.

== Academics ==
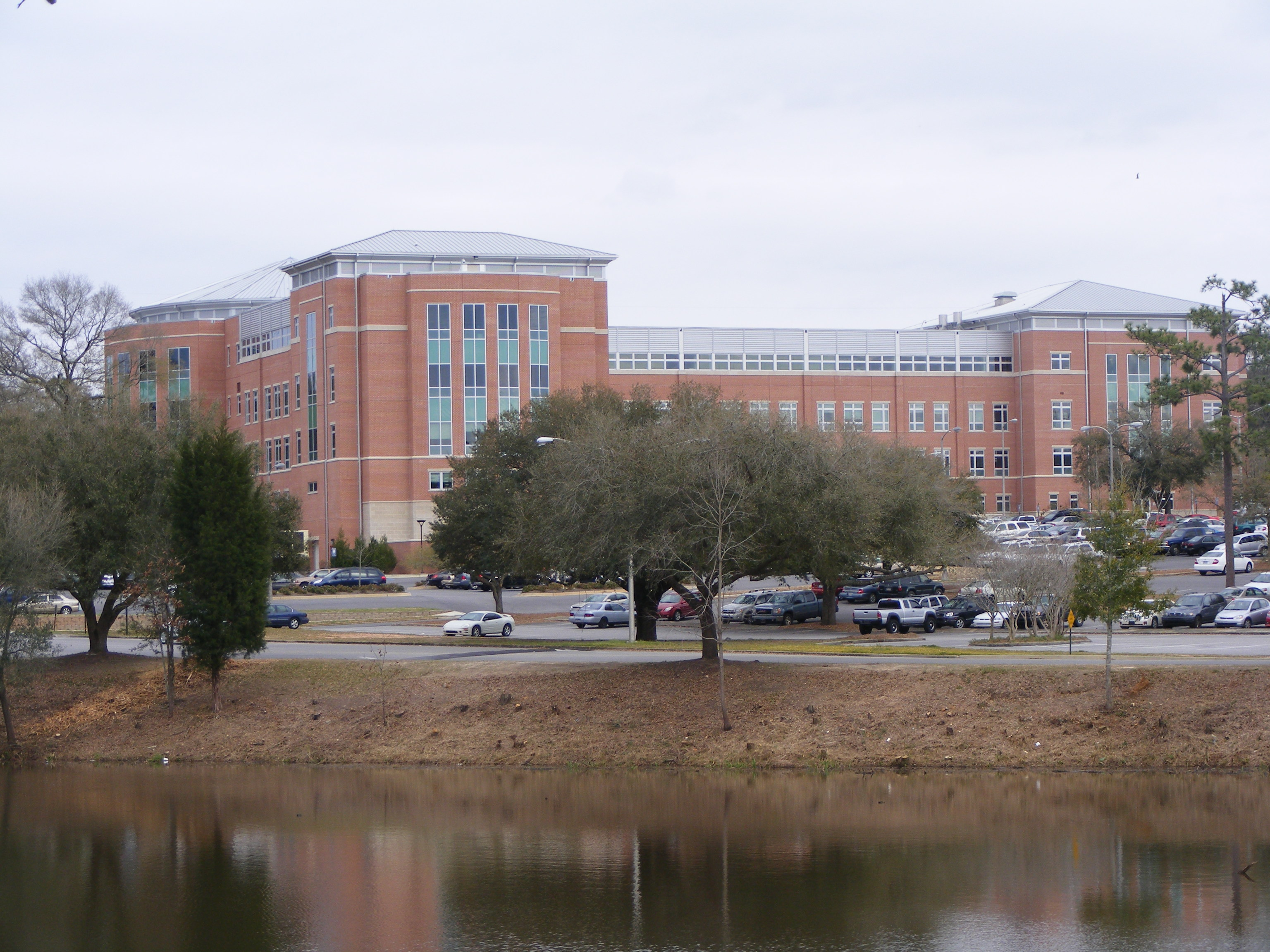
The Pat Capps Covey College of Allied Health and College of Nursing

Academic rankings

National
- Forbes: 616
- U.S. News & World Report: 363 (tie)
- Washington Monthly: 347

Global
- U.S. News & World Report: 1677 (tie)

The university offers a range of undergraduate and graduate degrees in ten colleges and schools. Several programs offer masters level degrees in addition to undergraduate degrees. Doctoral level degrees are offered in several areas, including a Doctor of Pharmacy degree offered in collaboration with Auburn University.

USA also offers classes in nearby Baldwin County at its Fairhope campus, and in 2015 opened Gulf Coast Campus. Students at South Alabama can choose from more than 50 bachelor's degree and certificate programs and more than 40 master's degree programs. As of 2011, USA ranks as the 22nd best public university in the southern United States, and 52nd overall in the South. It has an acceptance rate of 86.5%.

The student-faculty ratio at USA is 18:1. USA students are 57% female and 43% male. As of 2018, the university had a 44% six-year graduation rate and a 22% four-year graduation rate for bachelor's degree programs.

=== Colleges ===
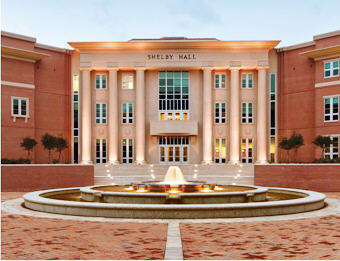
Shelby Hall - Home to the College of Engineering and School of Computing

The University of South Alabama has ten colleges and schools:

- Pat Capps Covey College of Allied Health Professions
- College of Arts and Sciences
- Mitchell College of Business
- College of Education and Professional Studies
- College of Engineering
- Frederick P. Whiddon College of Medicine
- College of Nursing
- School of Computing
- Honors College
- Graduate School

=== Administration ===
The university is governed by a board of trustees appointed by and including the governor of Alabama. The board appoints a president of the university. Frederick Palmer Whiddon served as president from 1963 until 1998 and was succeeded by V. Gordon Moulton who served until 2013. John W. Smith, the current executive vice president, served as an interim president until the arrival of Tony G. Waldrop in 2014 and after his retirement in 2021. Jo Bonner was appointed as university president in 2021.

== Athletics ==
The South Alabama Jaguars compete in the Sun Belt Conference with 17 varsity sports. Football began in 2009 and baseball, basketball, and other programs have national recognition.

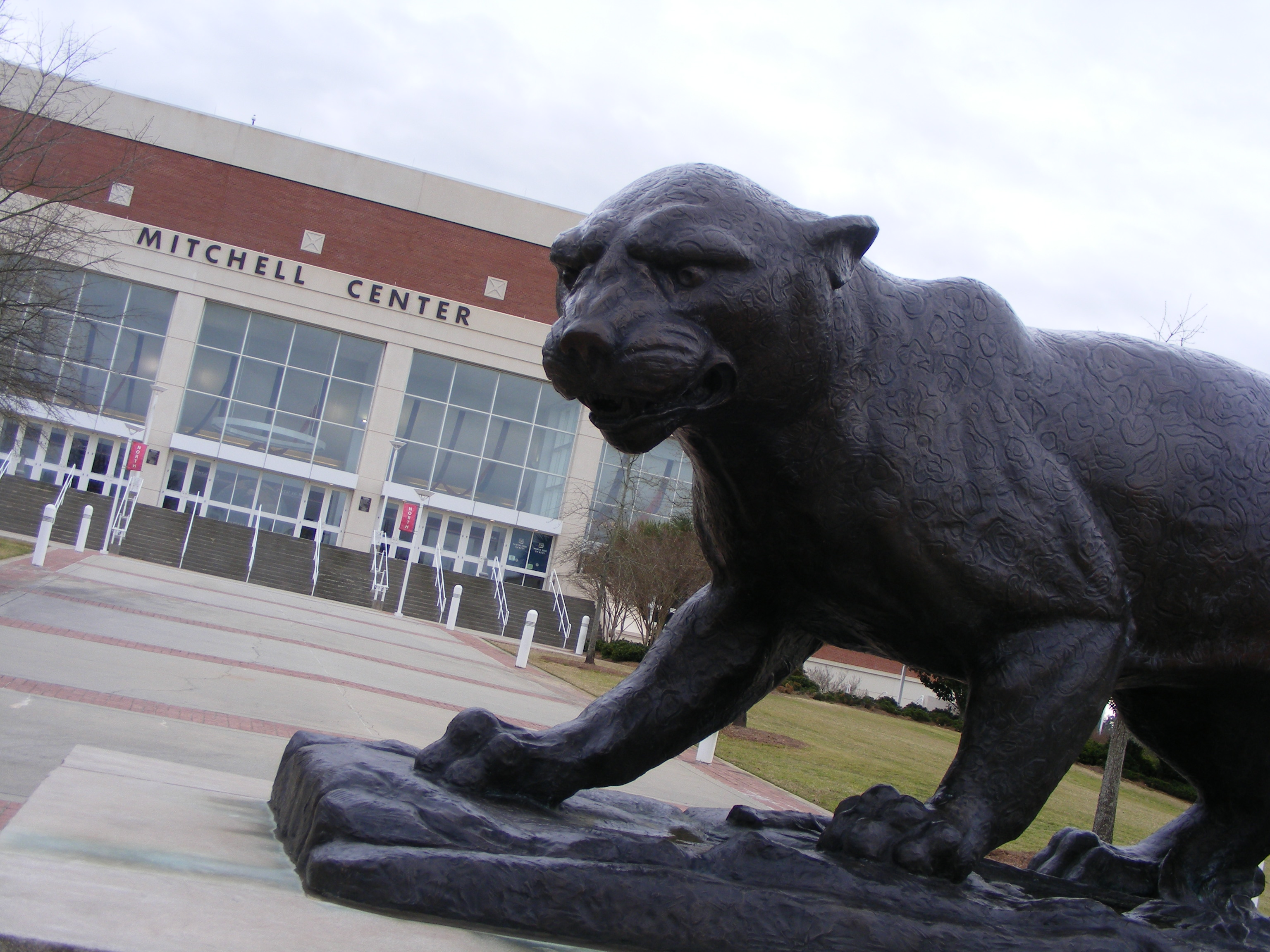
Jaguar statue and Mitchell Center Arena

=== Football ===
The football games are played on Abraham A. Mitchell Field on the Hancock Whitney Stadium since 2020.

=== Basketball ===
South Alabama men's and women's basketball play in the 10,000 seat Mitchell Center that opened in 1999.

=== Baseball and softball ===
South Alabama's home park is Eddie Stanky Field, a 3,775-seat stadium with a natural grass playing surface. The stadium was opened in 1980, renovated in 2004, and received new turf in 2024.

Softball is played at Jaguar Field since 2007. In 2015, the capacity was increased to 1,050.

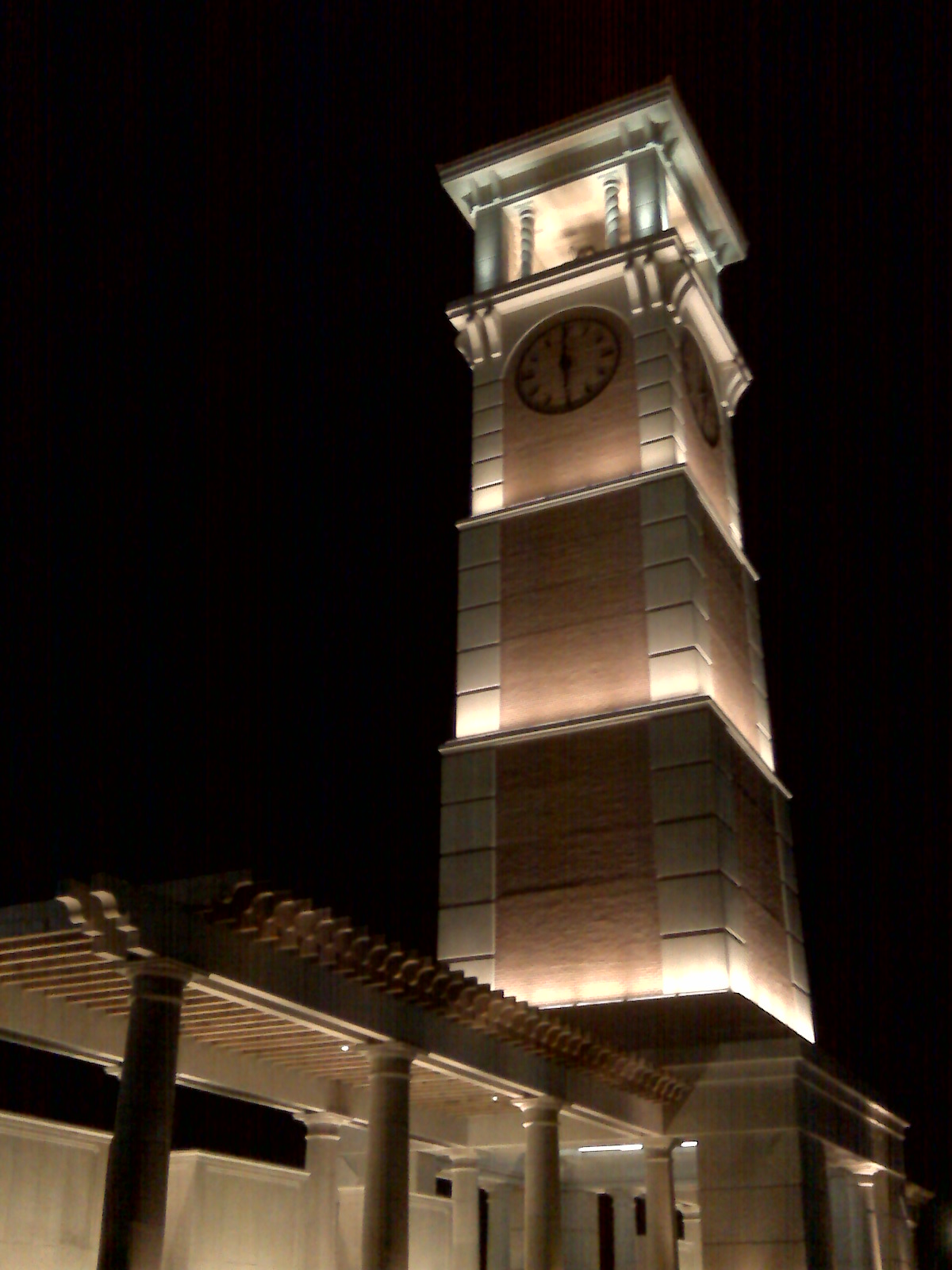
Moulton Bell Tower and Alumni Plaza

== Legal and other matters ==
=== Police shooting ===
On October 12, 2012, 18-year-old freshman Gil Collar was shot and killed by a campus police officer, after appearing naked outside the police station. Ashley Rich, the county district attorney, stated that Collar was under the influence of a non-controlled drug, NBOMe, that he had consume earlier that day at Bayfest. The student's family filed suit against the university, the officer involved, and the police chief, Herbert Earl "Zeke" Aull. In February 2013, a Mobile County judge ruled that the university was not liable for the student's death. In 2014, the case moved to federal court. In 2015, the officer was cleared in a civil suit. The shooting inspired Brian Burghart, then editor of the News & Review in Reno, to found Fatal Encounters, a database that tracks killings by law enforcement officers.

=== 2014 federal discrimination lawsuit ===
In 2014, a group of students belonging to Students for Life USA, a pro-life student organization, filed a complaint about alleged discrimination in federal court against University of South Alabama officials. The university later settled the lawsuit agreeing to change a portion of the university's policy on the use of space and facilities, and to pay an unspecified sum settling "all of plaintiff's remaining claims, including liability, damages, and attorney's fees".

=== Abuse lawsuits ===
In September 2021, a lawsuit was filed against a former University of South Alabama volleyball coach due to alleged sexual and mental abuse in 2019 and 2020. The lawsuit included eight former players as plaintiffs. The amendment also alleged that university administrators had knowledge of the abuse and added the university's athletic directors and coaches as defendants. In 2022, a second lawsuit was filed by an additional former player. WKRG-TV reported that the claims of abuse made by the second lawsuit was similar to the first and that both allegations included inappropriate touching and overtraining. The volleyball coach was hired by the University of South Alabama in December 2018 and resigned in February 2021.

Undergraduate demographics as of Fall 2023
Race and ethnicity	Total
White	61%
Black	22%
Hispanic	5%
Two or more races	5%
Asian	4%
Unknown	2%
American Indian/Alaska Native	1%
International student	1%
Economic diversity
Low-income (Note: The percentage of students who received an income-based federal Pell grant intended for low-income students.)	39%
Affluent (Note: The percentage of students who are a part of the American middle class at the bare minimum.)	61%

== Notable alumni ==
- David Freese, professional baseball player
- Luis Gonzalez, professional baseball player
- Michael Kearney, game show winner and child prodigy
- Jon Lieber, professional baseball player
- Juan Pierre, professional baseball player
- Augustine Rubit (born 1989), professional basketball player
- Heath Slocum, professional golfer

== Publications ==
- USA Vanguard
- College Student Journal
