= Raegan Higgins =

American mathematician

Raegan J. Higgins
- Born: Baton Rouge, LA
- Known for: Work with the EDGE program
- Scientific career
- Doctoral advisor: Allan Clemens Peterson and Lynn Erbe

Raegan J. Higgins is an American mathematician and co-director of the EDGE Program. She is also one of the co-founders of the website Mathematically Gifted & Black, which highlights the accomplishments of Black mathematicians.

== Education ==
Higgins went to Xavier University of Louisiana in New Orleans, Louisiana. She attended University of Nebraska-Lincoln for her graduate studies studying under the advisement of Lynn Erbe and Allan Clemens Peterson. She graduated in 2008 and was one of the first two African-American women to earn a doctoral degree in Mathematics from University of Nebraska-Lincoln. Higgins's doctoral dissertation was titled Oscillation theory of dynamic equations on time scales.

== Career ==
Higgins studies time scales and its application to mathematical biology.

Higgins, along with Ami Radunskaya, is co-director of the EDGE program, which supports women who are pursuing graduate degrees and ultimately careers in the mathematical sciences. She participated in the EDGE program in 2002 as a graduate student. She was also a workshop facilitator from 2014 to 2017. Professor Higgins became co-director of the program in 2017.

In 2008, Higgins joined the faculty at Texas Tech University in the Department of Mathematics & Statistics. She earned tenure and was promoted to Associate Professor, becoming the first tenured African American in the department.

== Honors and awards ==
In 2020, Higgins received the Association for Women in Mathematics (AWM) service award. She has won several National Science Foundation grants for various programs in mathematical education. She also earned the 2021 AWM Gweneth Humphreys Award. She co-delivered an invited plenary address at the 2021 National Math Festival.

Higgins' accomplishments earned her recognition by Mathematically Gifted & Black as a Black History Month 2018 Honoree.

== Selected publications ==
- Higgins, Raegan (2016). "Asymptotic and Oscillatory Behavior of Dynamic Equations on Time Scales". In Letzter, Gail; Lauter, Kristin; Chambers, Erin; Flournoy, Nancy; Grigsby, Julia Elisenda; Martin, Carla; Ryan, Kathleen; Trivisa, Konstantina (eds.). Advances in the Mathematical Sciences. Association for Women in Mathematics Series. Vol. 6. Cham: Springer International Publishing. pp. 341–355. doi:10.1007/978-3-319-34139-2_16. ISBN 978-3-319-34139-2.
- Higgins, Raegan; Mills, Casey J.; Peace, Angela (November 7, 2020). "A Time Scales Approach for Modeling Intermittent Hormone Therapy for Prostate Cancer". Bulletin of Mathematical Biology. 82 (11): 145. doi:10.1007/s11538-020-00821-z. ISSN 1522-9602. PMID 33159603.
