= Kimberly Sellers =

American statistician

- Born: Washington, D.C.
- Education: University of Maryland, College Park; George Washington University
- Scientific career
- Fields: Statistics
- Thesis: Vague Coherent Systems (2001)
- Doctoral advisor: Nozer Darabsha Singpurwalla
- Website: www.kimflaggsellers.com

Kimberly Flagg Sellers is an American statistician. She has been the head of the statistics department at North Carolina State University since 2023, where she is the first Black woman in the university's history to lead a science department. Previously, Dr. Sellers was a full professor of statistics at Georgetown University and a principal researcher in the Center for Statistical Research and Methodology of the United States Census Bureau, the former chair of the Committee on Women in Statistics of the American Statistical Association, a Fellow of the American Statistical Association, and an elected member of the International Statistical Institute. She specializes in count data and statistical dispersion, and is "the leading expert" on the Conway–Maxwell–Poisson distribution for count data. She has also worked in the medical applications of statistics, and in image analysis for proteomics.

== Education ==
Sellers is African-American, and was born in Washington, DC. Both her parents had advanced degrees; her father, pianist Thomas Flagg, became dean of fine arts at Howard University. She set herself the goal of getting a doctorate in the mathematical sciences by the time she was in elementary school, and would read Black Issues in Higher Education with her father and look up the number of African-Americans to receive the Ph.D. in the mathematical sciences.

She was a Benjamin Banneker scholar at the University of Maryland, College Park, with Raymond L. Johnson as a mentor, and earned bachelor's and master's degrees in mathematics at Maryland in 1994 and 1998, respectively. As a master's student at Maryland, she became interested in statistics after taking a class on the subject from Piotr Mikulski. Her master's thesis was Iterative methods for computing mean first passage times of Markov chains.

She completed her Ph.D. in statistics at George Washington University in 2001, supported by the Gates Millennium Scholars Program as one of their first cohort of students. Her dissertation was Vague coherent systems, with Nozer D. Singpurwalla as her doctoral advisor.

== Career ==
From 2001 to 2004, Sellers held a visiting assistant professorship and National Science Foundation supported postdoctoral scholarship at Carnegie Mellon University, where she worked with Bill Eddy and Stephen Fienberg. In 2004, she became an assistant professor of biostatistics and epidemiology at the University of Pennsylvania. She moved to Georgetown in 2006, at a time when the university was beginning a program in statistics, and took a second affiliation with the Census Bureau in 2015.

== Recognition ==
Sellers became an elected member of the International Statistical Institute in 2018. She was named a Fellow of the American Statistical Association in 2021.
