= MathFest =

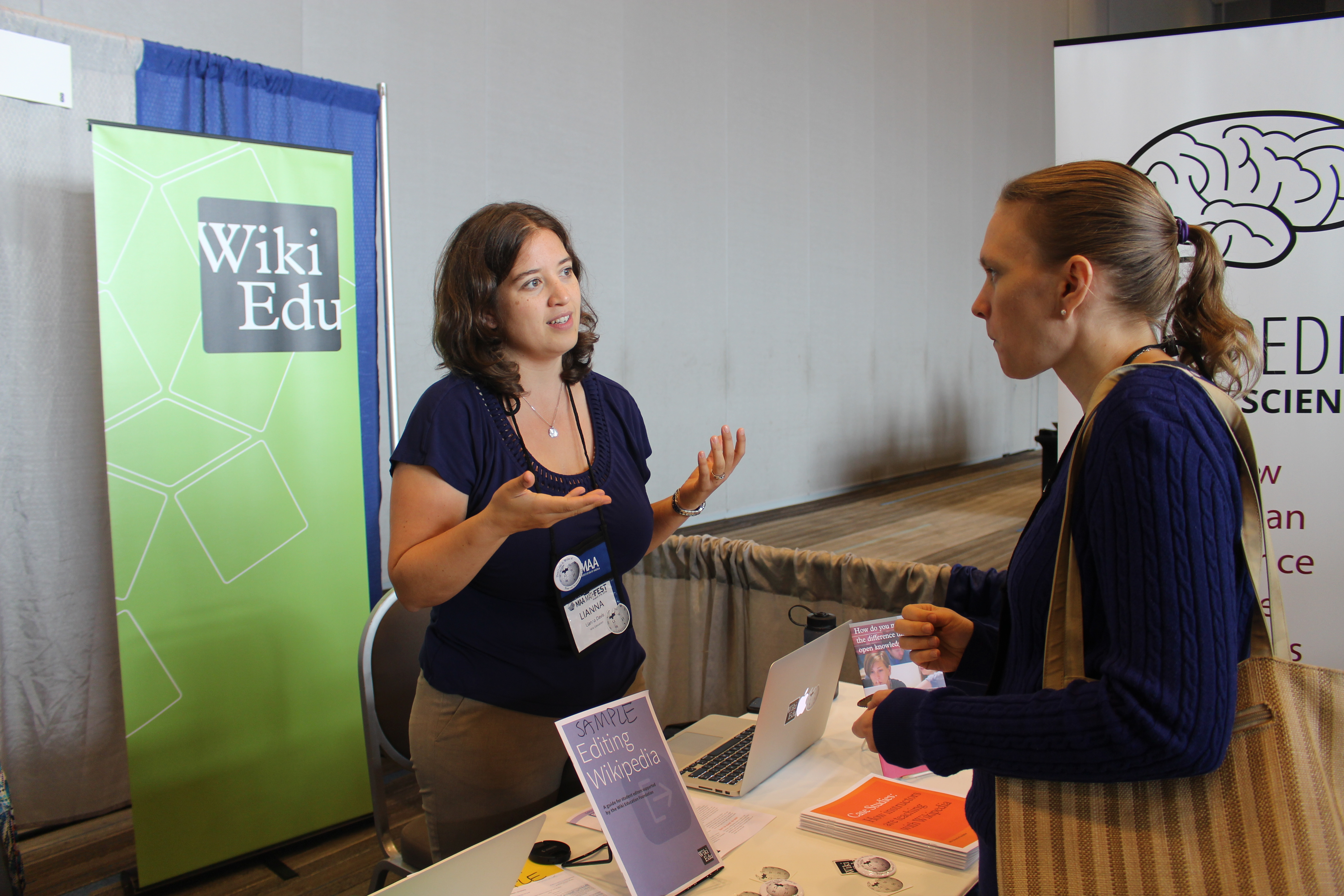
Exhibit booth at the MathFest Conference 2016

MathFest is a mathematics conference hosted annually in late summer by the Mathematical Association of America. It is known for its dual focus on teaching and research in mathematics, as well as for student participation.

== MathFest locations ==
Year	Dates	Location	Notes
2030	August 7-10	New York, NY	
2029	August 8-11	Chicago, IL	
2028	August 2-5	San Diego, CA	
2027	August 4-7	New Orleans, LA	
2026	August 5-8	Boston, MA	
2025	August 6-9	Sacramento, CA	
2024	August 7-10	Indianapolis, IN	
2023	August 2-5	Tampa, FL	
2022	August 3–6	Philadelphia, PA	
2021	August 4-7	virtual	
2020	July 29-August 1	~~Philadelphia, PA~~	canceled
2019	July 31-August 3	Cincinnati, OH	
2018	August 1-4	Denver, CO	
2017	July 26-29	Chicago, IL	
2016	August 3–6	Columbus, OH	
2015	August 5-8	Washington, DC	centennial anniversary
2014	August 6-9	Portland, OR	
2013	July 31-August 3	Hartford, CT	
2012	August 2-4	Madison, WI	
2011	August 4-6	Lexington, KY	
2010	August 5-7	Pittsburgh, PA	
2009	August 6-8	Portland, OR	
2008	July 31-August 2	Madison, WI	
2007	August 3-5	San Jose, CA	
2006	August 10-12	Knoxville, TN	
2005	August 4-6	Albuquerque, NM	
2004	August 11-13	Providence, RI	
2003	July 30-August 1	Boulder, CO	
2002	August 1-3	Burlington, VT	
2001	August 2-4	Madison, WI	

The 2015 meeting in Washington, D.C. was an extra day long in order to include events to mark the centennial anniversary of the MAA.

The 2020 meeting in Philadelphia, PA was cancelled due to the COVID-19 pandemic.

The 2021 meeting was held virtually due to the COVID-19 pandemic.

== Events ==
MathFest features many annual lectures, such as the Earle Raymond Hedrick Lecture Series, which consists of up to three lectures by the same presenter, on three consecutive days, and the AWM-MAA Falconer Lecture, which is given by a distinguished female mathematician or mathematics educator.

== See also ==
- Joint Mathematics Meetings (JMM)
- Gathering 4 Gardner
- International Congress of Mathematicians
