= List of African-American mathematicians =

The bestselling book and film, Hidden Figures, celebrated the contributions of African-American women mathematicians during the space race and highlighted the barriers they faced in studying and pursuing careers in mathematics and related fields. While Hidden Figures brought attention to these women, many other achievements by African Americans in mathematical sciences, research, education, and applied fields have remained relatively unknown. Despite this, the community of African-American mathematicians has been growing. Between 2000 and 2015, African Americans represented approximately 4–6% of graduates majoring in mathematics and statistics in the United States. This list catalogs Wikipedia articles on African Americans in mathematics, as well as early recipients of doctoral degrees in mathematics and mathematics education, books and studies about African-American mathematicians, and other major landmarks.

== Historical landmarks ==
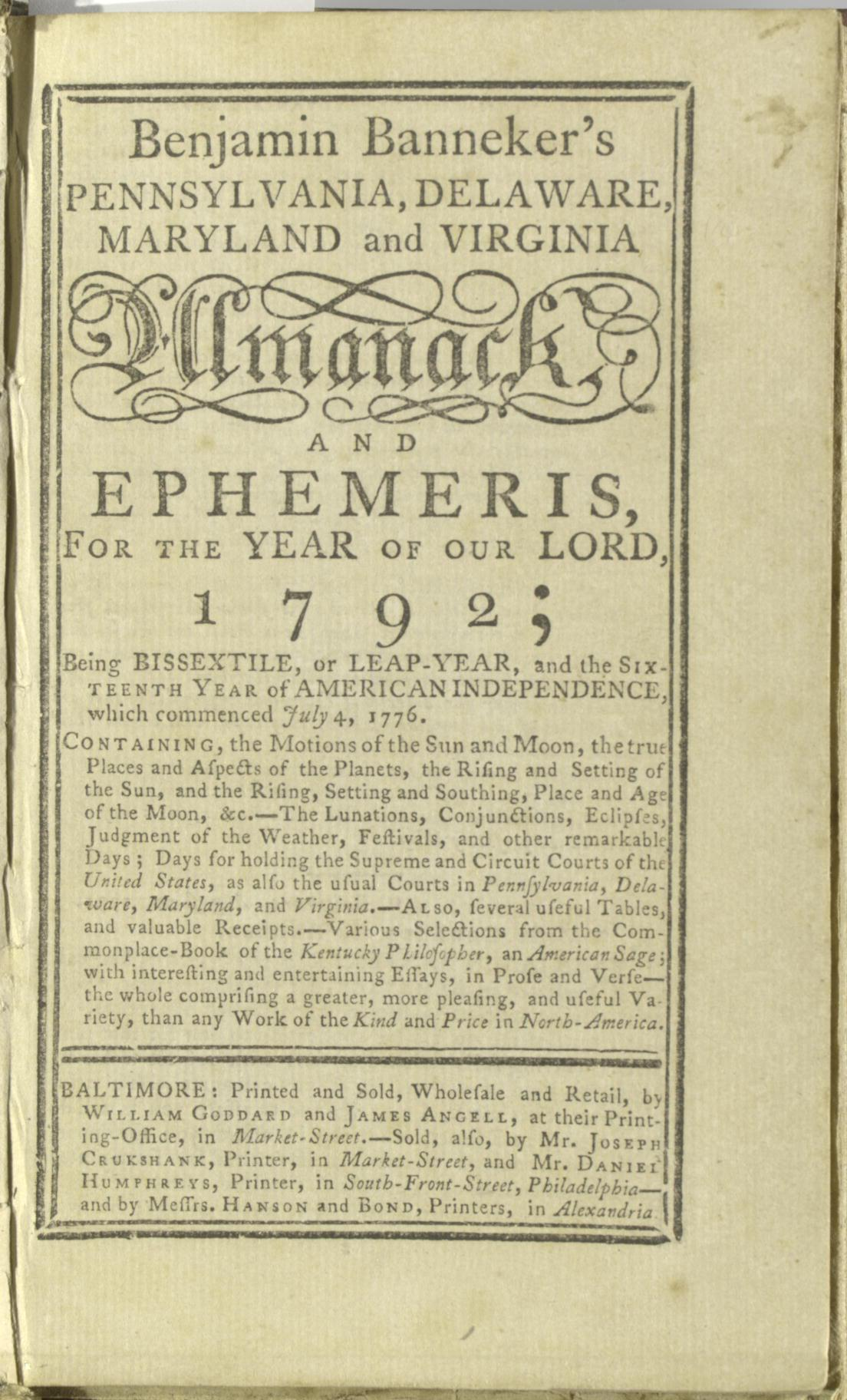
Title page, Benjamin Banneker's 1792 Almanac

Howard University in 1868

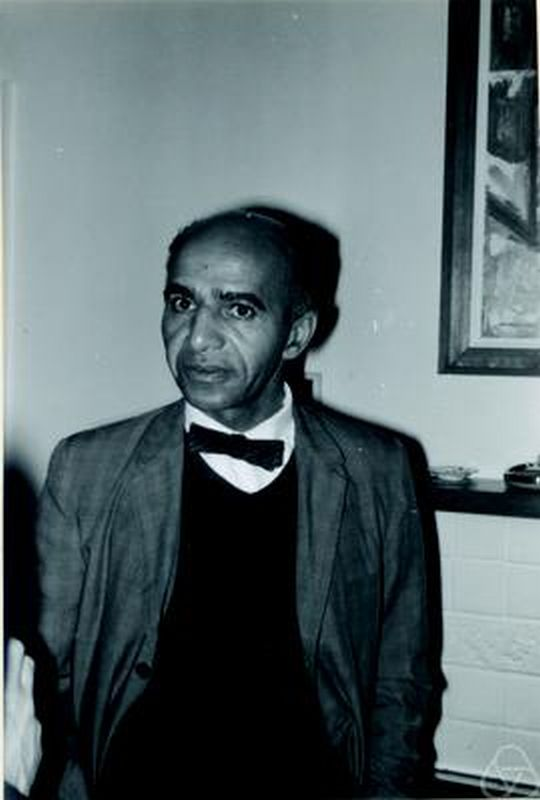
David Blackwell, 1967

1792: Benjamin Banneker calculated planetary movements and predicted eclipses in his Almanac.

1867: Howard University established its Department of Mathematics.

1895: Joseph Carter Corbin, president of Branch Normal College (now University of Arkansas at Pine Bluff), published his first problem in American Mathematical Monthly.

1916: Dudley Weldon Woodard became a charter member of the Mathematical Association of America (MAA).

1925: Elbert Frank Cox was the first African-American awarded a doctoral degree in mathematics, from Cornell University.

1929: Dudley Weldon Woodard was the first African-American mathematician known to publish in a mathematics journal, with the article "On two-dimensional analysis situs with special reference to the Jordan curve-theorem" in Fundamenta Mathematicae.

1943: Euphemia Lofton Haynes was the first African-American woman to gain a doctoral degree in mathematics.

1951: The MAA Board of Governors adopted a resolution to conduct their scientific and business meetings, and social gatherings "without discrimination as to race, creed, or color".

1956: Gloria Ford Gilmer is believed to have been the first African-American woman to publish mathematical research, co-authoring an article in Proceedings of the American Mathematical Society and another in Pacific Journal of Mathematics.

1969: 17 African-American mathematicians met in New Orleans, forming the National Association of Mathematicians to "promote excellence in the mathematical sciences and to promote the mathematical development of under-represented American minorities".

1973: Mathematician David Blackwell became the first African-American in any field to be elected to membership of the National Academy of Sciences.

1976: Howard University established the first PhD program in mathematics at a historically black college or university under mathematics department chair James Donaldson and professor J. Ernest Wilkins Jr.

1980: The Claytor Lecture – now the Claytor-Woodard Lecture in honor of William W S Claytor and Dudley Weldon Woodard – was established at MAA.

1982: Civil rights leader, Bob Moses (Student Nonviolent Coordinating Committee), used his MacArthur Fellowship to start the Algebra Project, a national mathematics literacy program for high schools.

1988: The MAA established a task force that led to the formation in 1990 of SUMMA, a program for the Strengthening of Underrepresented Minority Mathematics Achievement.

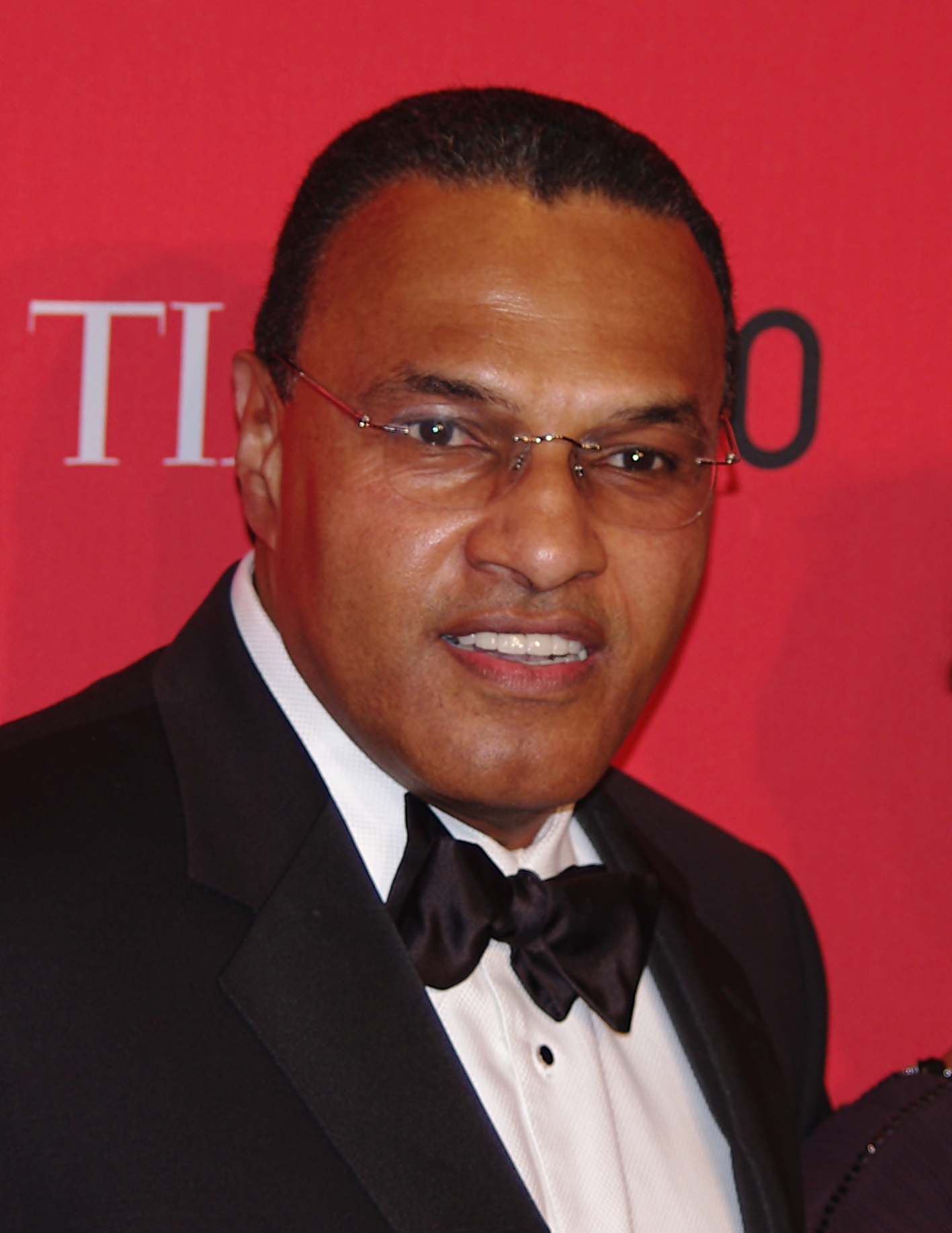
Freeman Hrabowski, 2012

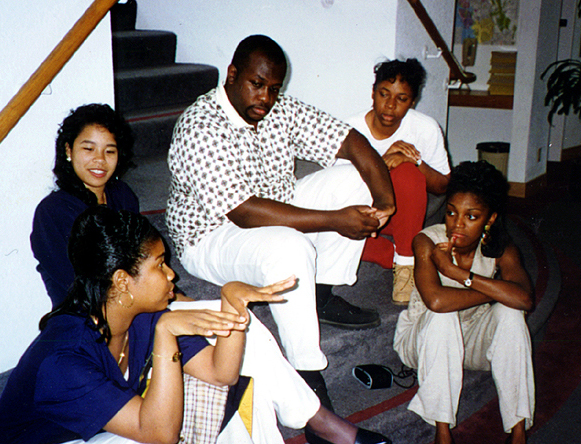
CAARMS, 1995

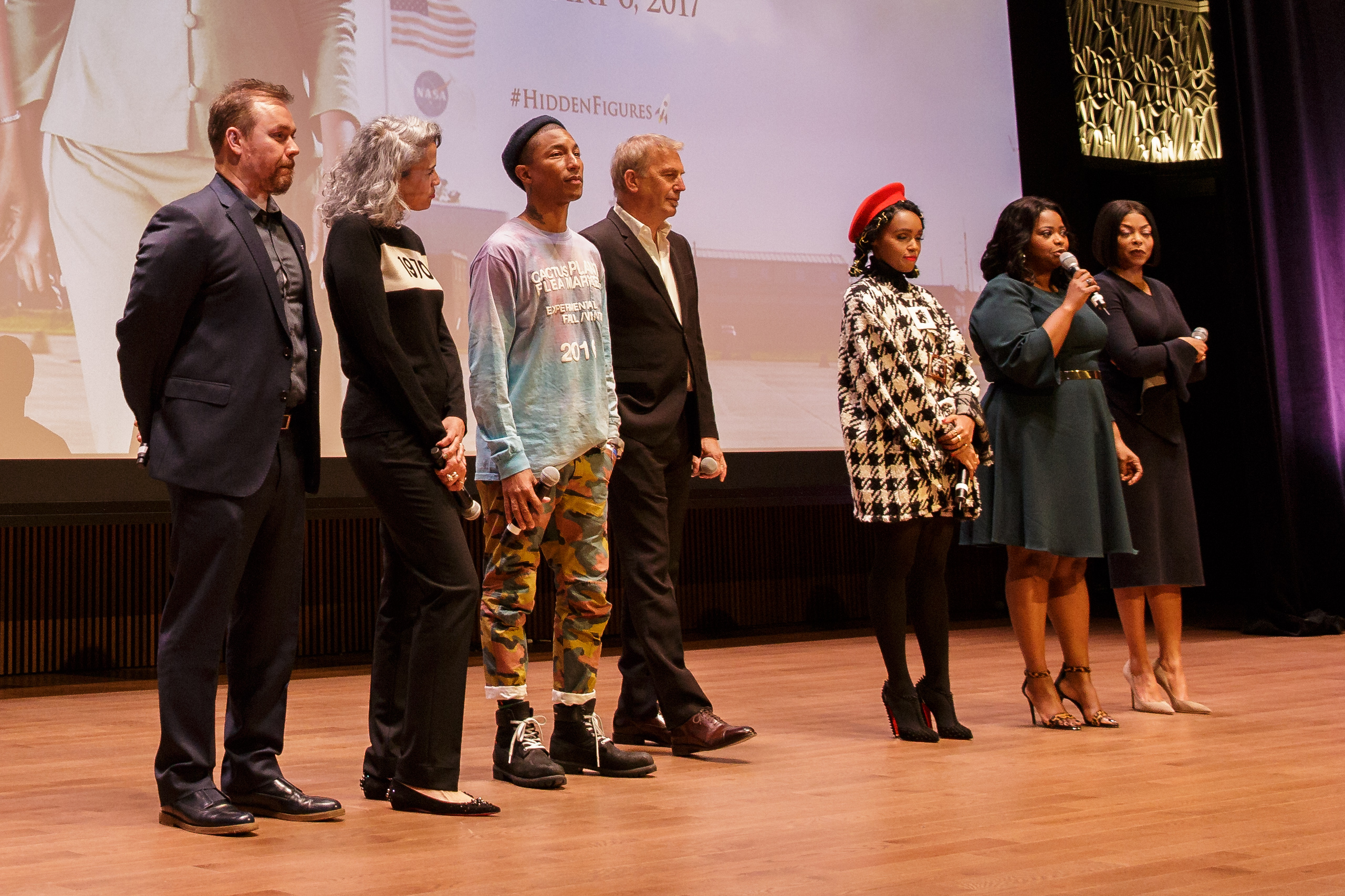
Hidden Figures screening at NMAAHC in 2016

1992: Mathematician Freeman Hrabowski became president of the University of Maryland.

1994: The Blackwell Lecture was established for MAA meetings, jointly by MAA and NAM, as well as the NAM Wilkins Lecture and Bharucha-Reid Lecture.

1995: The first CAARMS – Conference for African American Researchers in Mathematical Sciences – was held, to highlight the work of researchers and students and encourage the careers of under-represented groups in mathematics. Proceedings are published by the American Mathematical Society in its Contemporary Mathematics series.

1997: Kathleen Adebola Okikiolu was the first African American awarded a Sloan Research Fellowship and Presidential Early Career Award for Scientists and Engineers.

1997 Scott W. Williams produced the website Mathematicians of the African Diaspora, a collection of African-American mathematicians, newsletter, and resources on Africans in mathematics. By early 2007 it had close to 5 million visitors. The website has been cataloged by the Library of Congress.

1999: The mathematics departments of the 25 highest-ranked universities in the US had more than 900 faculty members, of whom 4 were African-American.

2003: Clarence F. Stephens was the first African-American to be honored with the Mathematical Association of America's (MAA) most prestigious award, for Distinguished Service to Mathematics.

2004: The Association for Women in Mathematics (AWM) and MAA formally established the Etta Zuber Falconer Lecture.

2015: Katherine Coleman Johnson received the Presidential Medal of Freedom.

2016: Hidden Figures, by Margot Lee Shetterley, was published, going on to win multiple awards and reach number 1 on the New York Times bestseller list. It tells the story of African-American women mathematicians at NASA during the space race.

2017: The film adaptation, Hidden Figures, was nominated for best movie at the Academy Awards, and Katherine Johnson makes an appearance at the ceremony.

2020: The updated website Mathematicians of the African Diaspora debuted in October. The new site is supported by the National Association of Mathematicians (NAM) and the Educational Advancement Foundation (EAF).

== Doctoral degrees in mathematics ==
The lists of doctoral degrees, including the Doctor of Philosophy (PhD) in mathematics and Doctor of Education (EdD), draw from these sources: Turner (1971), Greene (1974), Williams (1997), Zeitz (2008), Shakil (2010), and the Mathematical Association of America. (Please add any further candidates for these lists here, or on the talk page.)

=== First men and women ===
These are the first 12 known PhDs by African-American men and women in mathematics, in alphabetical order for years with multiple doctorate holders.

Year	Gender	Photo	Name	Awarded	Dissertation title	Ref.
1925	(M)	Portrait of Elbert Cox	Elbert Frank Cox	Cornell University	The polynomial solutions of the difference equation af(x+1) + bf(x) = φ(x)	
1928	(M)	External	Dudley Weldon Woodard	University of Pennsylvania	On two-dimensional analysis situs with special reference to the Jordan Curve Theorem	
1933	(M)	External	William Schieffelin Claytor	University of Pennsylvania	Topological immersion of peanian continua in a spherical surface	
1934	(M)	External	Walter Richard Talbot	University of Pittsburgh	Fundamental regions in S_{6} for the simple quaternary G_{60}, type I	
1938	(M)	External	Reuben Roosevelt McDaniel	Cornell University	Approximation to algebraic numbers by means of periodic sequences of transformations on quadratic forms	
1938	(M)	External	Joseph Alphonso Pierce	University of Michigan	A study of universe n finite populations with application to moment-function adjustments for grouped data	
1941	(M)	Portrait of David Blackwell	David Harold Blackwell	University of Illinois	Some properties of Markoff chains	
1942	(M)		Robert Coleman	Columbia University	The development of informal geometry	
1942	(M)	Portrait of J. Ernest Wilkins, Jr	Jesse Ernest Wilkins	University of Chicago	Multiple integral problems in parametric form in the calculus of variations	
1943	(F)	Portrait of Euphemia Lofton Haynes	M. Euphemia Lofton Haynes	Catholic University of America	Determination of sets of independent conditions characterizing certain special cases of symmetric correspondences	
1944	(M)	External	Joseph James Dennis	Northwestern University	Some points in the theory of positive definite J-fractions	
1944	(M)	External	Wade Ellis	University of Michigan	On relations satisfied by linear operators on a three dimensional linear vector space	
1944	(M)	External	Clarence F. Stephens	University of Michigan	Nonlinear difference equations analytic in a parameter	
1949	(F)		Evelyn Boyd Granville	Yale University	On laguerre series in the complex domain	
1950	(F)		Marjorie Lee Browne	University of Michigan	Studies of oneparameter subgroups of certain topological and matrix groups	
1961	(F)	External	Georgia Caldwell Smith	University of Pittsburgh	Some results on the anticenter of a group	
1962	(F)	External	Gloria Conyers Hewitt	University of Washington	Direct and inverse limits of abstract algebras	
1965	(F)	Portrait of Thyrsa Frazier Svager	Thyrsa Frazier Svager	Ohio State University	On the product of absolutely continuous transformations of measure spaces	
1966	(F)	Portrait of Vivienne Malone-Mayes	Vivienne Malone-Mayes	University of Texas at Austin	A structure problem in asymptotic analysis	
1966	(F)	External	Shirley Mathis McBay	University of Georgia	The homology theory of metabelian Lie algebras	
1966	(F)	External	Eleanor Green Dawley Jones	Syracuse University	Abelian groups and their endomorphism rings and the quasi-endomorphism of torsion free abelian groups	
1967	(F)	Portrait of Christine Darden	Geraldine Claudette Darden	Syracuse University	On direct sums of cyclic groups	
1967	(F)	External	Annie Marie Watkins Garraway	University of California, Berkeley	Structure of some cocycles in analysis	

=== Doctoral degrees 1925 to 1975 ===
This list includes PhDs awarded to African-Americans and to African immigrants by academic institutions in the United States.

Table key
Indicates first known African-American man or woman awarded a PhD at an academic institution

Year	Gender	Name	Awarded by	Dissertation title	Ref.
1925	(M)	Elbert Frank Cox	Cornell University	The polynomial solutions of the difference equation af(x+1) + bf(x) = [Phi](x)	
1928	(M)	Dudley Weldon Woodard	University of Pennsylvania	On two-dimensional analysis situs with special reference to the Jordan Curve Theorem	
1933	(M)	William Schieffelin Claytor	University of Pennsylvania	Topological immersion of peanian continua in a spherical surface	
1934	(M)	Walter Richard Talbot	University of Pittsburgh	Fundamental regions in S_{6} for the simple quaternary G_{60}, type I	
1938	(M)	Reubin Roosevelt McDaniel	Cornell University	Approximation to algebraic numbers by means of periodic sequences of transformations on quadratic forms	
1938	(M)	Joseph Alphonso Pierce	University of Michigan	A study of universe n finite populations with application to moment-function adjustments for grouped data	
1941	(M)	David H. Blackwell	University of Illinois	Some properties of Markoff chains	
1942	(M)	Robert Coleman	Columbia University	The development of informal geometry	
1942	(M)	Jesse Ernest Wilkins	University of Chicago	Multiple integral problems in parametric form in the calculus of variations	
1943	(F)	M. Euphemia Lofton Haynes	Catholic University of America	Determination of sets of independent conditions characterizing certain special cases of symmetric correspondences	
1944	(M)	Joseph James Dennis	Northwestern University	Some points in the theory of positive definite J-fractions	
1944	(M)	Wade Ellis	University of Michigan	On relations satisfied by linear operators on a three dimensional linear vector space	
1944	(M)	Clarence F. Stephens	University of Michigan	Nonlinear difference equations analytic in a parameter	
1945	(M)	Warren Hill Brothers	University of Michigan	On the solution of boundary value problems in hyperbolic differential equations	
1945	(M)	Jeremiah Certaine	Harvard University	Lattice-ordered groupoids and some related problems	
1949	(F)	Evelyn Boyd Granville	Yale University	On laguerre series in the complex domain	
1950	(F)	Marjorie Lee Browne	University of Michigan	Studies of oneparameter subgroups of certain topological and matrix groups	
1951	(M)	George H. Butcher	University of Pennsylvania	An extension of the sum theorem of dimension theory	
1953	(M)	Luna I. Mishoe	New York University	On the expansion of an arbitrary function in terms of the Eigenfunctions of a nonself adjoint differential system	
1953	(M)	Fred B. Wright	University of Chicago	Ideals in operator algebras	
1954	(M)	Charles Bernard Bell, Jr	University of Notre Dame	Structures of measure spaces	
1955	(M)	Vincent V. McCrae	Catholic University of America	On the unitary similarity of matrices	
1955	(M)	Abdulalim A. Shabazz	Cornell University	On the distribution of eigenvalues of [Integral sign]a̳-a̳a(s-t)[phi](t)dt=p[[integral sign]a̳-a̳b(s-t)[phi](t)dt+[eta][phi](s)]	
1956	(M)	Lloyd K. Williams	University of California, Berkeley	On separating transcendency bases	
1957	(M)	Elgy S. Johnson	Catholic University of America	Properties of solutions of nonlinear differential equations	
1957	(M)	John Quill Taylor King	University of Texas	A statistical analysis of the economic aspects of nineteen Protestant church-related colleges in Texas	
1959	(M)	Israel Everett Glover	Oklahoma State University	On analytic functions having as singular sets certain closed and bounded sets	
1959	(M)	Laurence Raymond Harper Jr	University of Chicago	Some properties of partially stable algebras	
1960	(M)	Charles Gladstone Costley	University of Illinois	Singular nonlinear integral equation with complex valued kernels of type N	
1960	(M)	Beauregard Stubblefield	University of Michigan	Some compact product spaces which cannot be imbedded in euclidean n-space	
1961	(M)	Jesse Paul Clay	University of Pennsylvania	Proximity and equicontinuity in transformation groups	
1961	(M)	Rogers Joseph Newman	University of Michigan	Capacity and Tchebycheff polynomials	
1961	(F)	Georgia Caldwell Smith	University of Pittsburgh	Some results on the anticenter of a group	
1962	(F)	Gloria Conyers Hewitt	University of Washington	Direct and inverse limits of abstract algebras	
1962	(M)	Robert Oreece Abernathy	University of California, Berkeley	On singular fourth order elliptic partial differential equations	
1962	(M)	John Henry Bennett	Harvard University	Truncation errors in numerical solutions of the transport equation	
1962	(M)	Socrates Walter Saunders	University of Pittsburgh	Analytic continuation by certain product-summability methods	
1962	(M)	Theodore Roosevelt Sykes	Pennsylvania State University	On a generalization of orthogonal polynomials	
1963	(M)	Joseph Battle	University of Michigan	Imbedding of graphs in orientable 2-manifolds	
1963	(M)	Simmie Samuel Blakney	University of Illinois	Lusin's theorem in metric theory	
1963	(M)	Earl Owen Embree	University of Illinois	A class of linear differential equations involving distributions	
1963	(M)	William Andrew McWorter	Ohio State University	Phi algebras	
1964	(F)	Mary Rodriguez Embry	University of North Carolina	Subspaces associated with contractions in Hilbert space	
1964	(M)	Alfred D. Stewart	University of Texas	On the Abel equation in n-dimensions, n ≥ 2	
1965	(F)	Thyrsa Frazier Svager	Ohio State University	On the product of absolutely continuous transformations of measure spaces	
1965	(M)	James Ashley Donaldson	University of Illinois	Integral representations of the extended airy integral type for the modified Bessel function	
1966	(M)	William Thomas Fletcher	University of Idaho	On the decomposition of associative algebras of prime characteristic	
1966	(F)	Vivienne Malone-Mayes	University of Texas at Austin	A structure problem in asymptotic analysis	
1966	(F)	Shirley Mathis McBay	University of Georgia	The homology theory of metabelian Lie algebras	
1966	(F)	Eleanor Green Dawley Jones	Syracuse University	Abelian groups and their endomorphism rings and the quasi-endomorphism of torsion free abelian groups	
1966	(M)	Harvey T. Banks	Purdue University	Optimal control problems with delay	
1966	(M)	John Albert Ewell	University of California, Los Angeles	On the determination of sets by sets of sums of fixed order	
1966	(M)	Charles Edward Morris	University of Illinois	Normal subgroups of the symplectic group on a countably infinite dimensional vector space	
1967	(F)	Geraldine Claudette Darden	Syracuse University	On direct sums of cyclic groups	
1967	(F)	Annie Marie Watkins Garraway	University of California, Berkeley	Structure of some cocycles in analysis	
1967	(M)	Llayron Leon Clarkson	University of Texas	A theorem concerning product integrals	
1967	(M)	Lloyd A. Demetrius	University of Chicago	Structural organization in cellular systems: a mathematical approach	
1967	(M)	Samuel Horace Douglas	Oklahoma State University	Convexity lattices related to topological lattices and incidence geometries	
1967	(M)	Melvin Heard	Purdue University	Linear functional differential equation of neutral type	
1967	(M)	Ralph Brooks Turner	Brown University	Low Reynolds number flow of particulate fluids	
1968	(F)	M. Lovenia DeConge-Watson	St. Louis University	2-normed lattices and 2-metric spaces	
1968	(M)	John Chukwuemeka Amazigo	Harvard University	Buckling under axial compression of long cylindrical shells with random axisymmetric imperfections	
1968	(M)	Earl Russell Barnes	University of Maryland	The optimal control of systems with distributed parameters	
1968	(M)	Milton Andrew Gordon	Illinois Institute of Technology	On a class of degree one algebras	
1968	(M)	Phillip Eugene McNeil	Pennsylvania State University	The structure of certain semigroups with two idempotents	
1968	(M)	Wilbur Lee Smith	Pennsylvania State University	On infinite product measures and semi-regular measures	
1968	(M)	Donald Frank St Mary	University of Nebraska	Oscillation and comparison theorems for second order linear differential equation	
1968	(M)	Donald Derrick Weddington	University of Miami	k-Spaces	
1968	(M)	James Harris White	University of Minnesota	Self-linking and the Gauss integral in higher dimensions	
1969	(F)	Etta Zuber Falconer	Emory University	Quasigroup identities invariant under isotopy	
1969	(M)	Raymond Lewis Johnson	Rice University	A priori estimates and unique continuation theorems for second order parabolic equations	
1969	(M)	Robert S. Smith	Pennsylvania State University	(Title not identified)	
1969	(M)	James Ernie Warner	Case Western University	Asymptotic properties of multivariate permutation tests with applications to signal detection	
1969	(M)	Scott Warner Williams	Lehigh University	The transfinite cardinal covering dimension	
1970	(M)	Japheth Hall	University of Alabama	On the theory of structures in sets	
1970	(M)	Guy Theodore Hogan	Ohio State University	Variations on the Hp problem for finite p-groups	
1970	(M)	Lonnie Williams Keith	Kansas State University	Nearly distribution-free tests for equal variances in two populations when the means are unknown	
1970	(M)	Sonde Ndubeze Nwankpa	Michigan State University	Generalized Sylvester Gallai configurations	
1971	(F)	Dolores Margaret Richard Spikes	Louisiana State University	Semi-valuations and groups of divisibility	
1971	(M)	Orville Edward Kean	University of Pennsylvania	Abstract horn theories	
1971	(M)	Nguthu John Mutio	Syracuse University	Frobenius groups	
1971	(M)	Eddie Robert Williams	Columbia University	The Poincaré lemma with estimates	
1970	(M)	Nathan Frank Simms	Lehigh University	Stable homotopy in Frobenius categories	
1971	(M)	Charles Dwight Lahr	Syracuse University	Approximate identities and multipliers for certain convolution measure algebras	
1972	(M)	Ethelbert Nwakuche Chukwu	Case Western University	Symmetries and identification of linear control systems	
1972	(M)	Oscar Henry Criner	University of California, Berkeley	Regularity properties of the solutions of the two dimensional Lagrangian problem and the Lagrangiah multiplier	
1972	(M)	Christopher Olutunde Imoru	Northwestern University	The Jensen-Steffensen inequality	
1972	(M)	Carlos Ford-Livene	University of Southern California	Estimation, prediction, and dynamic programming in ecology	
1972	(M)	Curtis Sylvester Means	Rensselaer Polytechnic Institute	Initial value problems for a class of higher order partial differential equations which are related to the heat equation	
1972	(M)	Floyd Leroy Williams	Washington University in St Louis	Reduction of tensor products of principle series representation of complex semi-simple Lie groups	
1972	(M)	James E. White	Yale University	(Algebraic topology - title not identified)	
1973	(F)	Evelyn E. Wilson Thornton	University of Houston	Generalised Vietoris-Begle theorems	
1973	(M)	Annas Aytch	University of Pittsburgh	Consistency of complex Noerland transforms	
1973	(M)	Garth Arnold Baker	Cornell University	Projection methods for boundary value problems for equations of elliptic and parabolic type with discontinuous coefficients	
1973	(M)	Robert Edward Bozeman	Vanderbilt University	Periodic solutions in the plane four-body problem of mixed circular-elliptic type	
1973	(M)	Lloyd Alvin Gavin	Illinois Institute of Technology	On some classes of FK-spaces and on summability factors	
1973	(M)	Seyoum Getu	University of Missouri	Generalizing alternative rings	
1973	(M)	James Ervin Ginn	Texas A&M University	Product estimators in sample surveys	
1973	(M)	Isom Harris Herron	Johns Hopkins University	A fluid dynamical theory for the motion of a particle undergoing centrifugation	
1973	(M)	Frank A. James	New York University	(Title not identified)	
1973	(M)	Manuel Keepler	University of New Mexico	Backward and forward equations for random evolutions	
1973	(M)	Clement Aynsley Water McCalla	Massachusetts Institute of Technology	Optimal control of linear hereditary systems with quadratic criterion	
1973	(M)	Michael Noel Payne	University of California, Berkeley	Structural stability and quadratic dynamical systems	
1973	(M)	Chester Cornelius Seabury	Stanford University	Some extension theorems for regular maps of Stein manifolds	
1973	(M)	Hampton Wright	University of North Carolina	Coefficient identities derived from symmetric function expansions	
1974	(F)	Elayne Arrington Idowu	University of Cincinnati	The p-Frattini subgroup of a finite group	
1974	(F)	Rada Ruth Higgins McCreadie	Ohio State University	On the asymptotic behavior of certain sequences	
1974	(M)	Roosevelt Gentry	Rutgers University	Compact interpolation between Banach spaces	
1974	(M)	Tepper L. Gill	Wayne State University	Tensor products of contraction semigroups on Hilbert spaces	
1974	(M)	Johnny Lee Houston	Purdue University	On the theory of fitting classes in certain locally finite groups	
1974	(M)	Arthur Melvin Jones	University of Iowa	On goodness-of-fit tests for normality	
1974	(M)	Nathaniel Knox	University of South Carolina	On the inverse semigroup coproduct of an arbitrary non-empty collection of groups	
1974	(M)	Kevin Ejere Osondu	State University of New York, Buffalo	A unified theory of extension of bins to semigroups and of semigroups to groups	
1974	(M)	Willie Elmer Taylor	University of Houston	Oscillatory properties of nonselfadjoint fourth order differential equations	
1974	(M)	Alton Smith Wallace	University of Maryland	Representation theorems for solutions of differential operator equations	
1975	(F)	Cheryll Suber-Gerelle	Kansas State University	A Markov process for predicting adult student behavior	

=== Doctoral degrees in mathematics education to 1975 ===
This list includes doctorates specifically in mathematics education and doctorates in education by mathematicians/mathematics educators.

Table key
First	Indicates first known African-American man or woman awarded a doctorate in education at an academic institution

Year	Gender	Name	Awarded by	Dissertation title	Ref.
1942	(M)	Socrates Walter Saunders	University of Pittsburgh	Legal aspects of the education of Negroes with special emphasis on the equalization principle	
1947	(F)	Ethel M. Turner	Columbia University	Consumer mathematics in adult education	
1950	(M)	Caldwell Elwood Boulware	Columbia University	The emerging concept of mental arithmetic	
1951	(M)	Theodore A Love	New York University	The relation of achievement in mathematics to certain abilities in problem-solving	
1954	(F)	Angie Turner King	University of Pittsburgh	An analysis of early algebra textbooks used in the American secondary schools before 1900	
1954	(M)	Wendell Primus Jones	University of Chicago	The Negro press and the higher education of Negroes, 1933-1952: a study of news and opinion on higher education in the three leading Negro newspapers	
195?	(M)	Thomas E Bonner	Oklahoma State University	(Title not identified)	
1956	(M)	Henry Madison Eldridge	University of Pittsburgh	A study in the variation in accomplishment and subject preference in different secondary schools	
1957	(M)	Raymond Jackson Pitts	University of Michigan	An analysis and evaluation of supplementary teaching materials found in selected secondary school textbooks	
1958	(M)	James Horatio Means	Oklahoma State University	Objectives of mathematics instruction in seven Texas colleges	
1959	(M)	Major Boyd Jones	Cornell University	Techniques, methods, procedures and provisions used in selected Maryland public secondary schools in teaching mathematics to rapid learners	
1960	(F)	Lillian Katie Bradley	University of Texas	An evaluation of the effectiveness of a collegiate general mathematics course	
1961	(F)	Sadie Gasaway	Cornell University	The effectiveness of continued testing in mathematics of freshmen of varying proficiencies at Tennessee Agricultural and Industrial State University	
1962	(F)	Louise Nixon Sutton	New York University	Concept learning in trigonometry and analytic geometry at the college level: a comparative study of two methods of teaching trigonometry and analytic geometry at the college level	
1963	(F)	Grace Alele Williams	University of Chicago	Dynamics of education in the birth of a new nation: case study of Nigeria	
1964	(F)	Beryl Eleanor Hunte	New York University	Demonstrative geometry during the twentieth century: an account of the various sequences used in the subject matter of demonstrative geometry from 1900 to the present time	
1964	(M)	Ulysses Hunter	Purdue University	Essential cluster sets	
1964	(M)	Louis Clinton Marshall	American University	Approximately continuous transformations on compact metric spaces	
1965	(M)	John Arthur Jones	Pennsylvania State University	An intensive investigation and analysis of means for improving the mathematics programs in the colleges and universities of the United States with predominantly negro student bodies	
1966	(M)	Eugene William Madison	University of Illinois	Computable algebraic structures and non-standard arithmetic	
1967	(M)	Matthew William Crawford	Colorado State College	An analysis of the mathematics curriculum in the negro public high schools in Louisiana	
1967	(M)	Calvin Elijah King	Ohio State University	A comparative study of the effectiveness of teaching a course in remedial mathematics to college students by television and by the conventional method	
1967	(M)	Irvin Elmer Vance	University of Michigan	Geometries of the Erlanger Program	
1967	(M)	Marcus Harold Whitfield	Oklahoma State University	Theory of maxima and minima and applications	
1969	(M)	Boniface	Iowa State University	Structure of inseparable composites	
1969	(M)	Paul Burgette Mohr	Oklahoma State University	A study of Negro mathematics faculties in predominantly Negro institutions	
1969	(M)	William Percy Hytche	Oklahoma State University	A comparative analysis of four methods of instruction in mathematics	
1969	(M)	Benjamin Joseph Martin	Purdue University	On a new integral equation arising in the theory of radiative transfer	
1969	(M)	Richard Lionel Price	Ohio State University	Scholastic aptitude test in mathematics as a predictor of student selection of algebraic versus geometric approaches to problem solving	
1969	(M)	Washington Theophilus Taylor	Oklahoma State University	A cross sectional study of the modification of attitudes of selected prospective elementary school teachers toward mathematics	
1969	(M)	Vernon Williams	Oklahoma State University	A multi-predictive measure to predict success at two levels in freshman college mathematics	
1970	(F)	Genevieve Madeline Knight	University of Maryland	The effect of a sub-culturally appropriate language upon achievement in mathematical content	
1970	(F)	Joella Hardeman Gipson	University of Illinois	Teaching probability in the elementary school: an exploratory study	
1970	(M)	David James Hickman	University of Notre Dame	The Tschebyscheff polynomials for regular polygons inscribed in the unit circle of the complex plane	
1970	(M)	Rufus Grier Pettis	Oklahoma State University	An analysis of the methods being used to make provisions for outstanding high school mathematics students in North Carolina	
1973	(F)	Therese Hance Braithwaite	University of California, Berkeley	The development of a function theory in education based on a construct of a unity	
1974	(F)	Della Pearl Domonek Bell	University of Texas	Some characteristics of high- and low- achieving seventh grade Black students in mathematics	
1975	(M)	Freeman Alphonsa Hrabowski III	University of Illinois	A comparison of the graduate academic performance of black students who graduated from predominantly black colleges and from predominantly white colleges	

== Books and articles about African-American mathematicians ==
This list includes books and dissertations published about individual African-Americans in mathematics, and studies, biographical anthologies or histories dedicated to African-Americans in mathematics. (This list is incomplete. You can help by expanding it.)

=== Individuals ===
- Benjamin Banneker:
  - Bedini, Silvio A (1999). The life of Benjamin Banneker: the first African-American man of science. Maryland Historical Society.
  - Hinman, Bonnie (2000). Benjamin Banneker: American Mathematician and Astronomer (Colonial Leaders).
- David Blackwell:
  - Blackwell, David; Wilmot, Nadine (2003). An oral history with David Blackwell. Bancroft Library.
  - Black, Robert (2019). David Blackwell and the Deadliest Duel. Royal Fireworks Press.
- Joseph James Dennis:
  - Williams, Sherese LaTrelle (2016). To Humbly Serve: Joseph James Dennis and His Contributions to Clark College. Clark Atlanta University.
- Marjorie Kimbrough
  - Kimbrouogh, Marjorie (1991). Accept no limitations: a black woman encounters corporate America. Abingdon Press.
- Shirley Mathis McBay:
  - Verheyden-Hilliard, Mary Ellen (1985). Mathematician and Administrator, Shirley Mathis McBay. Equity Institute.
- J. Ernest Wilkins Jr.:
  - Nkwanta, Asamoah; Barber, Janet E. (2018). "Episodes in the Life of a Genius: J. Ernest Wilkins Jr." Notices of the American Mathematical Society. Volume 65, Number 2.

=== Anthologies and studies ===
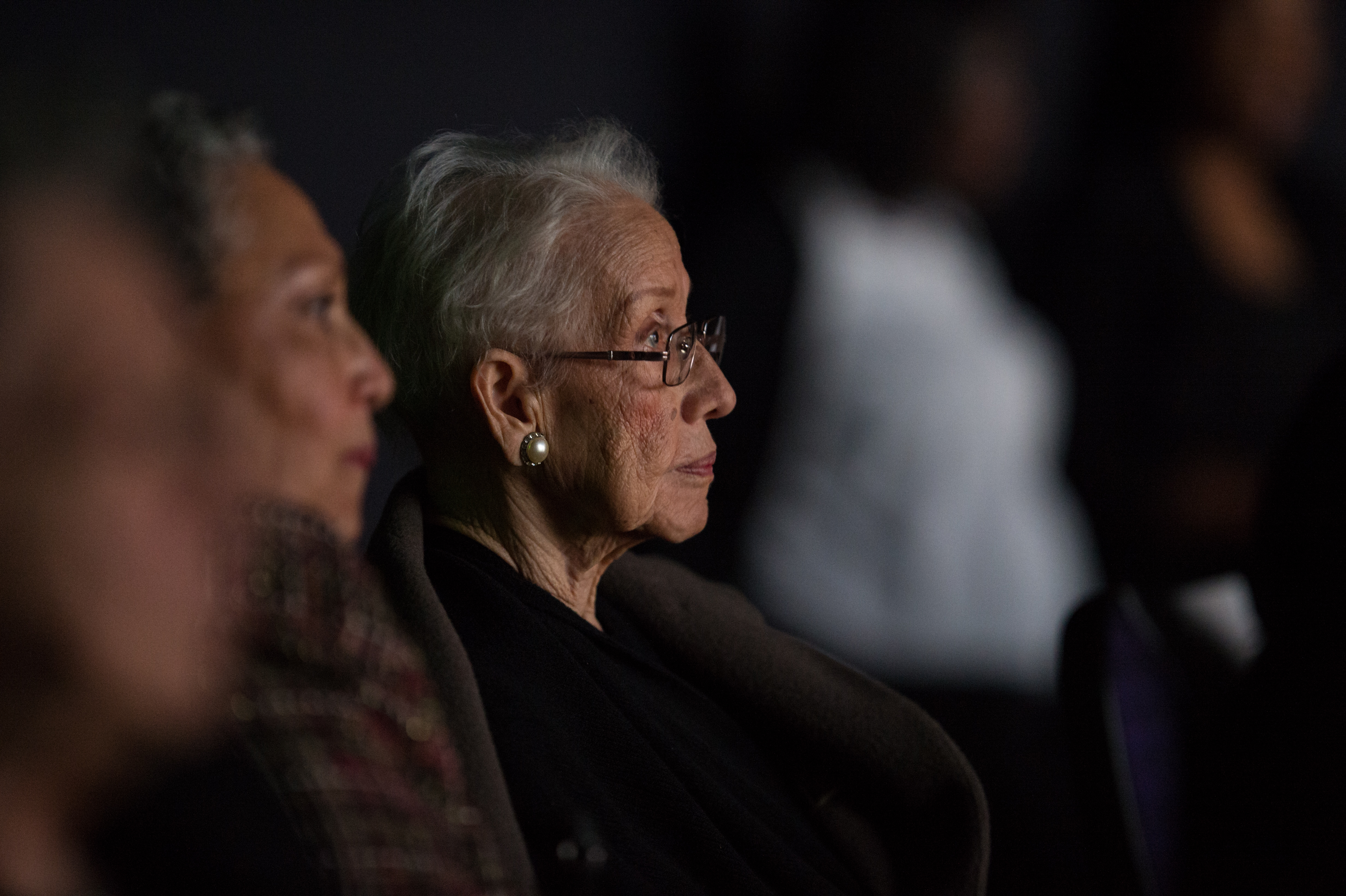
Katherine Johnson watching the Hidden Figures premiere in 2016

- Borum, Viveka; Hilton, Adriel Adon; Walker, Erica (2016). The Role of Black Colleges in the Development of Mathematicians. Journal of Research Initiatives.
- Carlson, Cob; Parks, Yolanda; et al. (1996). Breakthrough: profiles of scientists of color. Working with Numbers. Blackside.
- Dean, Nathaniel (ed) (1997). African Americans in mathematics: DIMACS workshop, June 26–28, 1996. American Mathematical Society.
- Farmer, Vernon L; Shepherd-Wynn, Evelyn (2012). Voices of historical and contemporary Black American pioneers.
- Harmon, Marylen; Guertler, Sherry (1994). Visions of a dream: history makers: contributions of Africans and African Americans in science and mathematics. M.E. Harmon.
- Houston, Johnny L (2000). The History of the National Association of Mathematicians (NAM): The First Thirty (30) Years, 1969–1999. NAM.
- Kenschaft, Patricia Clark (2005). Change is possible: Stories of women and minorities in mathematics.
- Lang, Mozell P. Contributions of African American scientists and mathematicians. Harcourt School Publishers.
- Newell, Victoria; Gipson, Joella; Rich, Waldo L.; Stubblefield, B (1980). Black Mathematicians and Their Works.
- Paul, Richard; Moss, Steven (2015). We Could Not Fail: The First African Americans in the Space Program. University of Texas Press.
- Shetterly, Margot Lee (2016). Hidden Figures: The American dream and the untold story of the black women mathematicians who helped win the space race.
- Walker, Erica N (2014). Beyond Banneker: Black mathematicians and the path to excellence.
- Williams, Lisa D (2000). The trials, tribulations, and triumphs of black faculty in the math and science pipeline: a life history approach (Dissertation). University of Massachusetts at Amherst.
- Williams, Talithia M (2018). Power in numbers: The rebel women of mathematics. Race Point Publishing.

=== For young people ===
- Becker, Helaine; Phumiruk, Dow (2018). Counting on Katherine: How Katherine Johnson Saved Apollo 13. Henry Holt and co.
- Pinkney, Andrea Davis (1998). Dear Benjamin Banneker.
- Schwartz, Heather E (2017). NASA Mathematician Katherine Johnson. Lerner Publications.
- Shetterly, Margot Lee; Conkling, Winifred; Freeman, Laura (2018). Hidden Figures: The True Story of Four Black Women and the Space Race. HarperCollins.

== List of Wikipedia articles ==
This list includes Wikipedia articles for people from the African diaspora who have postgraduate degrees in mathematics or statistics, have worked in mathematics, or are known for mathematical accomplishments in the United States (African-Americans). The list is grouped by the time the person's first degree in mathematics was awarded, or when they began their work in mathematics. Individuals are listed alphabetically within time periods. PhDs in mathematics education are included.

=== Before 1900 ===
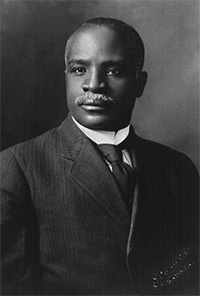
Kelly Miller

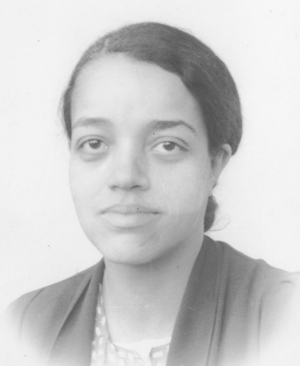
Dorothy Johnson Vaughan

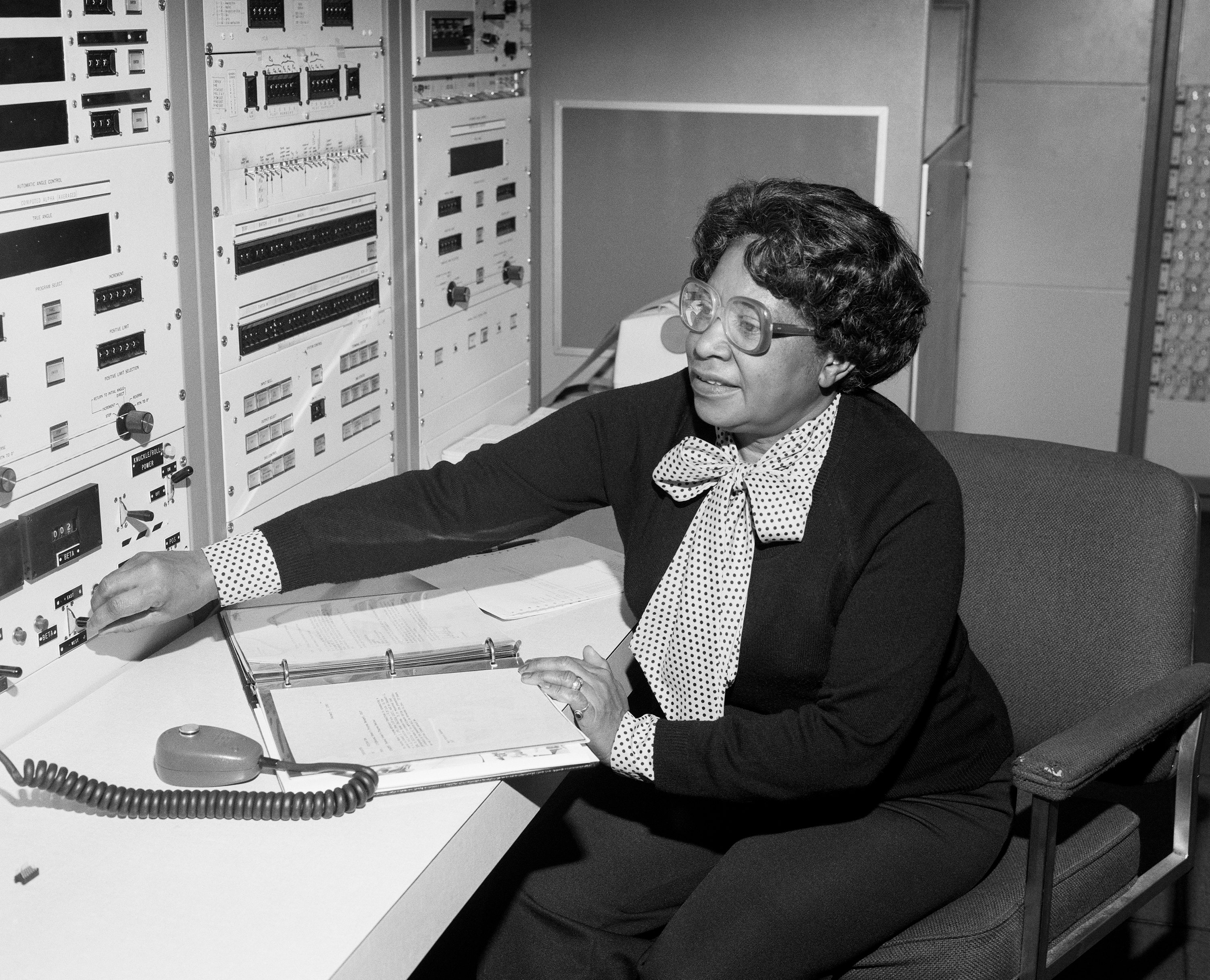
Mary Jackson, at NASA in 1980

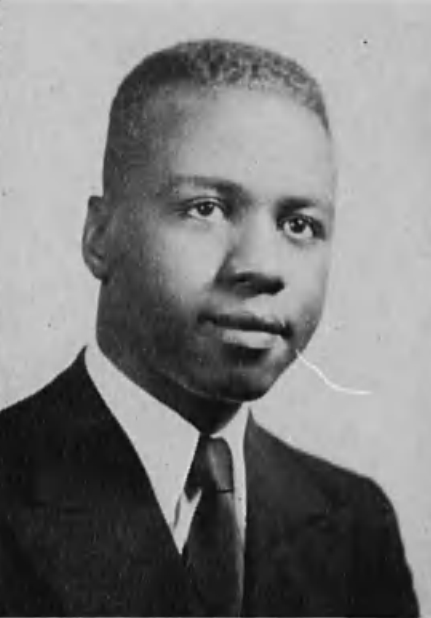
Abdulalim Shabazz in 1949

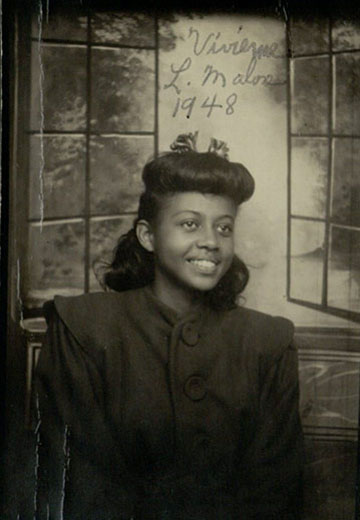
Vivienne Malone-Mayes

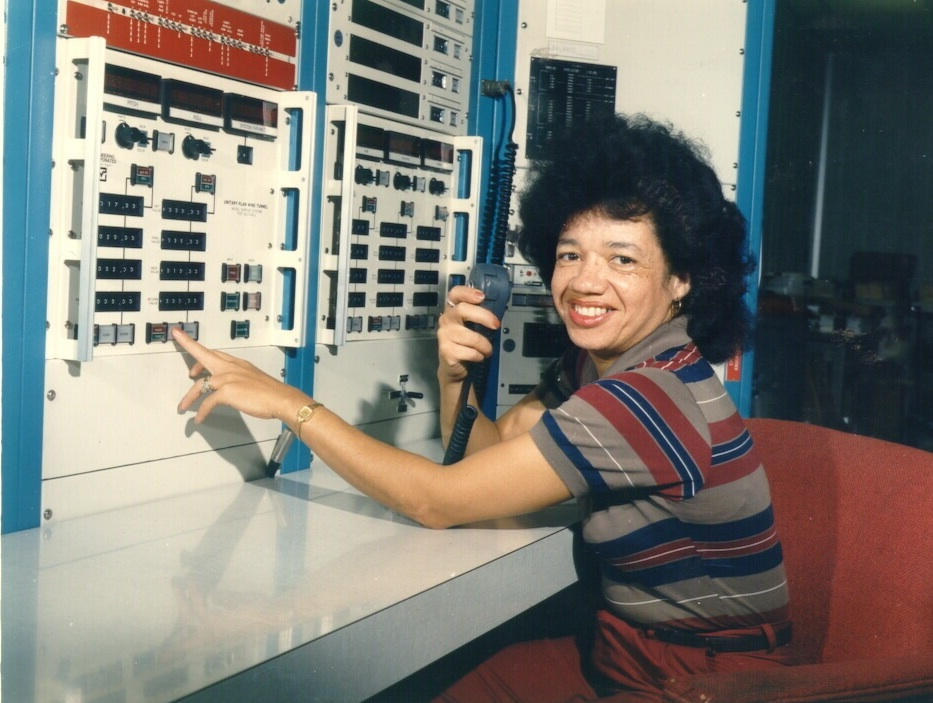
Christine Darden, wind tunnel control room, NASA

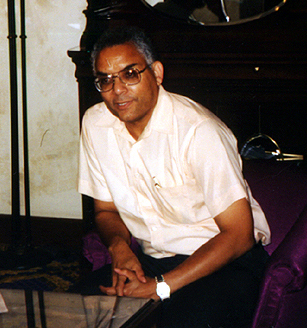
Raymond L. Johnson

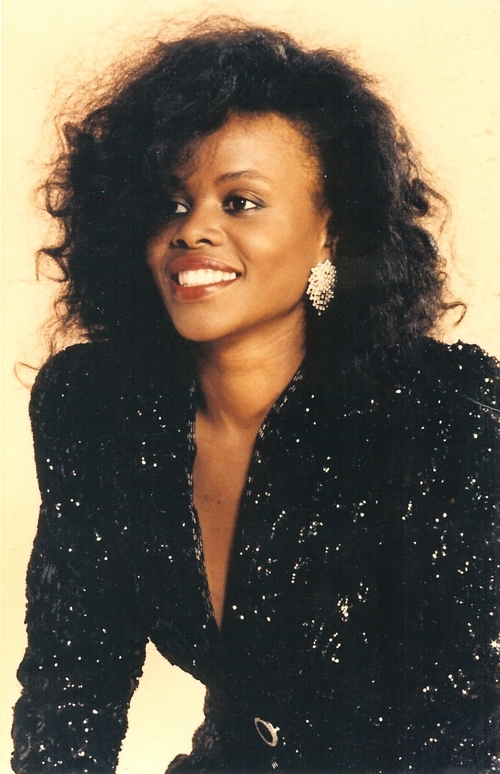
Iris M. Mack

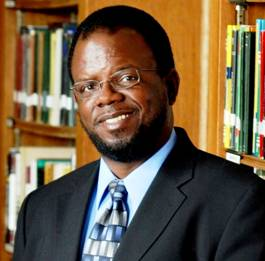
William A. Massey

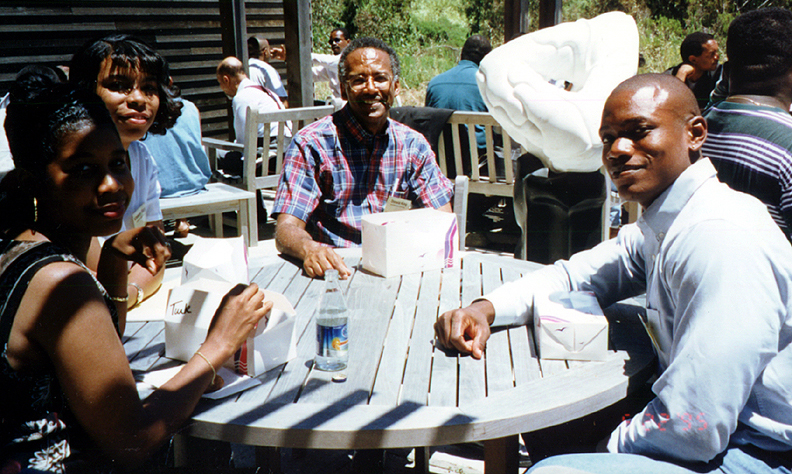
CAARMS meeting, Berkeley, 1995

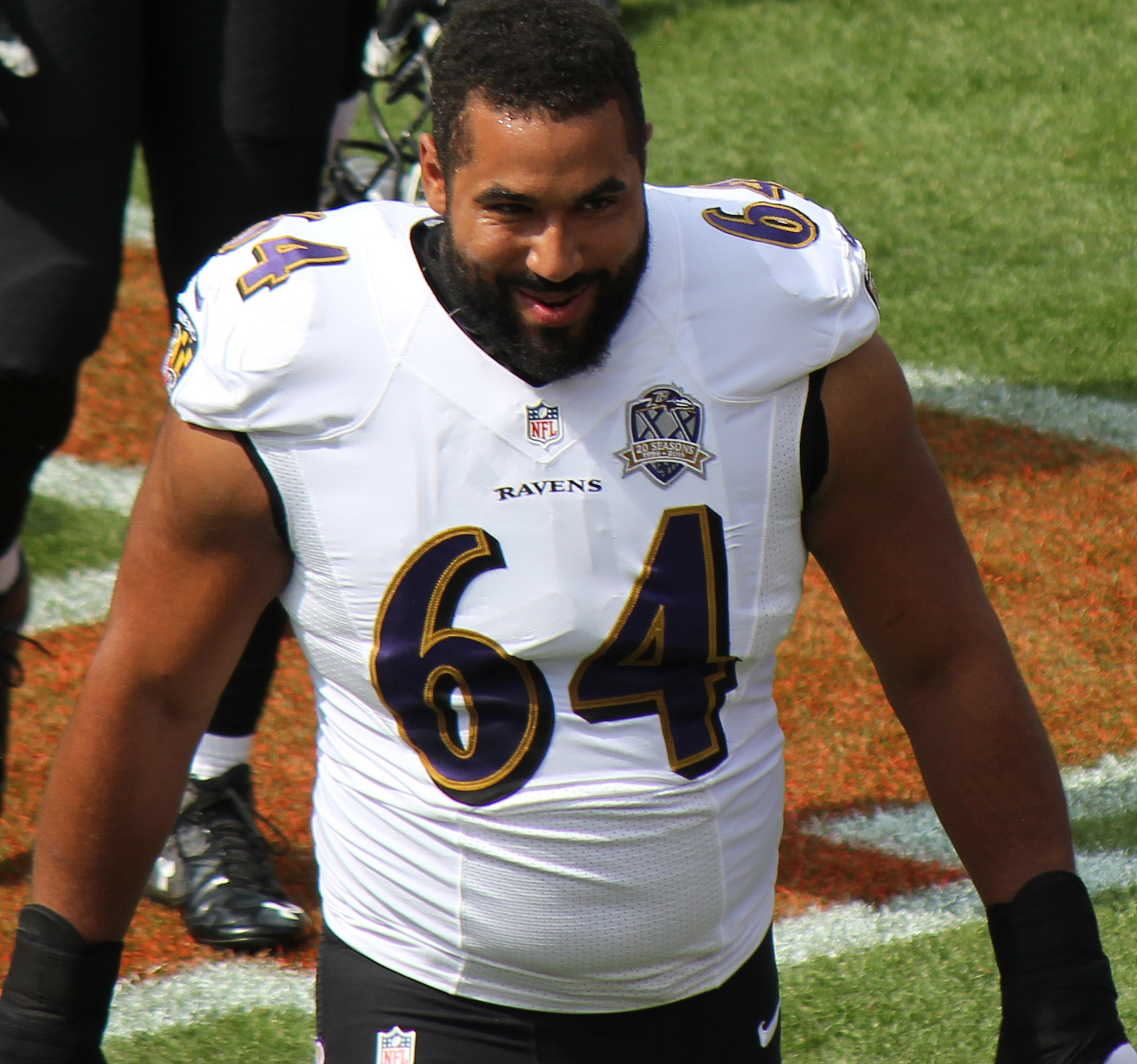
John Urschel

- Benjamin Banneker (1731–1806)
- Kelly Miller (1863–1939), degrees from Howard University, including law degree
- Charles Reason (1818–1893)
- Thomas Fuller (1710–1782)

=== 1900s ===
- Dudley Weldon Woodard (1881–1965), degrees from Wilberforce University, University of Chicago, University of Pennsylvania (PhD)

=== 1910s ===
- Elbert Frank Cox (1895–1969), degrees from Indiana University, Cornell University (PhD)
- Euphemia Haynes (1890–1980), Smith College, Catholic University of America (PhD)

=== 1920s ===
- Joseph J. Dennis (1905–1977), degrees from Clark College, Northwestern University (PhD)
- Angie Turner King (1905–2004), degrees from West Virginia State College, including chemistry, University of Pittsburgh (PhD, mathematics education)
- Georgia Caldwell Smith (1909–1961), degrees from University of Kansas, University of Chicago, University of Pittsburgh (PhD)
- Dorothy Vaughan (1910–2008), degree from Wilberforce University

=== 1930s ===
- David Blackwell (1919–2010), degrees from University of Illinois at Urbana–Champaign (PhD)
- Marjorie Lee Browne (1914–1979), degrees from Howard University, University of Michigan (PhD)
- Katherine Johnson (1918–2020), degree from West Virginia State College
- Clarence F. Stephens (1917–2018), degrees from Johnson C. Smith University, University of Michigan (PhD)

=== 1940s ===
- Albert Turner Bharucha-Reid (1927–1985), degree from Iowa State University
- Gloria Ford Gilmer, degrees from Morgan State University, University of Pennsylvania, Marquette University (PhD, education)
- Evelyn Boyd Granville (1924–2023), Smith College, Yale University (PhD)
- Mary Winston Jackson (1921–2005), degree from Hampton Institute
- Eleanor Green Dawley Jones (1929–2021), degrees from Howard University, Syracuse University (PhD)
- Abdulalim A. Shabazz (1927–2014), degrees from Lincoln University (Pennsylvania), Massachusetts Institute of Technology (MIT), Cornell University (PhD)
- Louise Nixon Sutton (1925–2006), degrees from North Carolina A&T State University, New York University (PhD, education)
- J. Ernest Wilkins, Jr. (1923–2011), degrees from University of Chicago, New York University (including degrees in engineering)

=== 1950s ===
- Geraldine Claudette Darden (born 1936), degrees from Hampton Institute, University of Illinois, Syracuse University (PhD)
- Mary Deconge (1933–2025), degrees from Seton Hill College, Louisiana State University, St. Louis University (PhD)
- Annie Easley (1933–2011), degrees from Xavier University, mathematics at Cleveland State University
- Etta Zuber Falconer (1933–2002), degrees from Fisk University, University of Wisconsin, Emory University (PhD)
- William Thomas Fletcher, degrees from North Carolina Central University, University of Idaho (PhD)
- Gloria Conyers Hewitt (born 1935), degrees from Fisk University, University of Washington (PhD)
- Vivienne Malone-Mayes (1932–1995), degrees from Fisk University, University of Texas (PhD)
- Melba Roy Mouton (1929–1990), degrees from Howard University
- Dolores Margaret Richard Spikes (1936–2015), degrees from Southern University, University of Illinois (PhD)
- Thyrsa Frazier Svager (1930–1999), degrees from Antioch College, Ohio State University (PhD)
- Argelia Velez-Rodriguez (b. 1936 in Cuba), degrees from Marianao Institute, University of Havana (PhD)
- Grace Alele Williams (1932–2022), degrees from University of Ibadan, University of Chicago (PhD, education)

=== 1960s ===
- Sylvia D. Trimble Bozeman (born 1947), degrees from Alabama A&M University, Vanderbilt University, Emory University (PhD)
- Christine Darden (born 1942), degrees from Hampton Institute, Virginia State University, George Washington University (PhD, engineering)
- Lloyd Demetrius, degrees from University of Cambridge, University of Chicago (PhD)
- James A. Donaldson (1941–2019), degrees from Lincoln University (Pennsylvania), University of Illinois at Urbana-Champaign (PhD)
- Fern Y. Hunt (born 1948), degrees from Bryn Mawr College, New York University (PhD)
- Raymond L. Johnson (born 1943), degrees from University of Texas at Austin, Rice University (PhD)
- Ronald Elbert Mickens (born 1943), degrees from Fisk University, Vanderbilt University (PhD, physics)
- John Peoples (born 1926), degrees from Jackson State University, University of Chicago (PhD, higher education)
- Jeanette Scissum, degrees from Alabama A&M University, computer science PhD
- Scott W. Williams (born 1943), degrees from Morgan State University, Lehigh University (PhD)

=== 1970s ===
- Jacqueline Akinpelu (born 1953), degrees from Duke University and Johns Hopkins University (Ph.D., applied mathematics)*Augustin Banyaga (born 1947 in Rwanda), degrees from University of Geneva (PhD)
- Emery N. Brown, degree from Harvard College and Harvard University (PhD, statistics)
- Freeman Alphonsa Hrabowski III (born 1950), degrees from Hampton Institute, University of Illinois (PhD, higher education administration/statistics)
- Iris Marie Mack, degrees from Vassar College (double major with physics), University of California, Los Angeles, Harvard University (PhD)
- Carolyn Ray Boone Mahoney (born 1946), degrees from Siena College, Ohio University (PhD)
- William Alfred Massey (born 1956), degrees from Princeton University, Stanford University (PhD)
- Lee Stiff (1949–2021), degrees from University of North Carolina at Chapel Hill, Duke University, North Carolina State University (PhD, education)

=== 1980s ===
- Idris Assani (b. in Niger), degrees from Paris Dauphine University, Pierre and Marie Curie University (PhD, mathematics)
- Emery Neal Brown, degrees from Harvard University (PhD, statistics) and Harvard Medical School (MD)
- Melvin Currie (born 1948), degrees from Yale University and University of Pittsburgh (PhD, mathematics)
- Clifford Victor Johnson (b. 1968 in UK), degrees from Imperial College London and University of Southampton (PhD, mathematics and physics)
- Bob Moses (1935–2021), degrees from Hamilton College, and Harvard University (MA, philosophy); founder of Algebra Project (1982)
- Arlie Oswald Petters (b. 1964 in Belize), degrees from City University of New York and Massachusetts Institute of Technology (PhD, mathematics)
- Janice B. Walker PhD, mathematics, University of Michigan - Ann Arbor (1982)
- Suzanne L. Weekes (b. in Trinidad & Tobago), degrees from Indiana University and University of Michigan (PhD, mathematics and scientific computing)

=== 1990s ===
- Ron Buckmire (b. 1968 in Grenada), degrees from Rensselaer Polytechnic Institute (PhD, mathematics)
- Toka Diagana (b. in Mauritania, degrees from Tunis El Manar University and Claude Bernard University Lyon 1 (PhD, mathematics
- Edray Goins (born 1972), degrees from California Institute of Technology and Stanford University (PhD, mathematics)
- Rudy Horne (1968–2017), degrees from University of Oklahoma and University of Colorado Boulder (PhD, applied mathematics); mathematical consultant for the movie Hidden Figures
- Trachette Jackson (born 1972), degrees from Arizona State University and University of Washington (PhD, mathematics)
- Chawne Kimber (born 1971), degrees from University of North Carolina and University of Florida (PhD, mathematics)
- Marilyn Strutchens (born 1962), degrees from the University of Georgia (PhD, mathematics education)
- Aissa Wade (b. 1967 in Senegal), degrees from University Montpellier 2, France (PhD, mathematics)
- Talitha Washington (born 1974), degrees from Spelman College and University of Connecticut (PhD, mathematics)

=== 2000s ===
- Carla Cotwright-Williams (born 1973), degrees from California State University, Long Beach, Southern University, and University of Mississippi (PhD, mathematics)
- Christina Eubanks-Turner, degrees from Xavier University of Louisiana and University of Nebraska–Lincoln (PhD, mathematics)
- Omayra Ortega, degrees from Pomona College and University of Iowa (PhD, mathematics)
- Candice Price, degrees from California State University, Chico, San Francisco State University, and University of Iowa (PhD, mathematics)
- Dionne Price, degrees from Norfolk State University, University of North Carolina, and Emory University (PhD, biostatistics)
- Loni Tabb, degrees from Drexel University (mathematics) and Harvard University (PhD, biostatistics)
- Chelsea Walton (born 1983), degrees from Michigan State University and the University of Michigan (PhD, mathematics)
- Talithia Williams, degrees from Spelman College, Howard University, Rice University (PhD, statistics)
- Ulrica Wilson, degrees from Spelman College and Emory University (PhD, mathematics)

=== 2010s ===
- John Urschel (b. 1991 in Canada), degrees from Pennsylvania State University (MS, Mathematics) and the Massachusetts Institute of Technology (Ph.D., Mathematics)
