= Elgy =

Elgy is a unisex given name. Notable people with the name include:

- Elgy Gillespie (born 1948), Irish journalist and author
- Elgy Johnson (1912–1987), American mathematician
- Elgy Morales (born 1975), Costa Rican football coach
