= Joseph Dennis =

Joseph Dennis may refer to:

- Joseph Dennis (cricketer) (1778–1831), English cricketer
- Joseph Dennis (mathematician) (1905–1977), American mathematician
