= Leon R. Tarver II =

American academic administrator (born c. 1948)

President of Southern University
- Preceded by: Dolores Richard Spikes
- Succeeded by: Edward Jackson

Personal details
- Born: c. 1948 Shreveport, Louisiana, U.S.
- Spouse: Cynthia Tarver
- Education: Southern University; Harvard University's John K. Kennedy School of Government; The Union Institute

Leon R. Tarver II (born c. 1948) is an American academic administrator. He served as the president of Southern University, a public, historically black university in Baton Rouge, Louisiana, from 1997 to 2005.

== Early life and education ==
Tarver was born c. 1948 in Shreveport, Louisiana. He attended local schools before college. He earned a Bachelor of Arts degree in political science from Southern University Baton Rouge, a master's of public administration from Harvard University (John K. Kennedy School of Government), and a doctor of philosophy from The Union Institute in Cincinnati, Ohio.

== Career ==
Tarver joined Southern University as a professor of Public Administration in 1992. He was the executive administrator of SU's Center of Cultural Heritage and International Programs. He served as its president from 1997 to 2005.

In addition, he has worked at international development in Haiti, England, France, and Africa, including Ghana, Mozambique, Nigeria, and South Africa. In 2013 Tarver was appointed to the Board of Trustees of Southern University by Governor Bobby Jindal. Since 2015, he has served as the chairman of SU's board.

Tarver was also the Secretary of the Louisiana Department of Revenue and Taxation.

== Personal life ==
Tarver has a wife, Cynthia.
