= 2019 IFMA World Muaythai Championships =

2019 World Muaythai Championships
- Venue: Huamark Sports Complex
- Location: Bangkok, Thailand
- Start date: 22 July
- End date: 28 July
- Competitors: 600 from 89 nations

The 2019 IFMA World Muaythai Championships is the 18th edition of the IFMA World Muaythai Championships. The competition are held from July 18 to July 28, 2019, in Bangkok, Thailand. The event served as a qualifier for the 2021 World Games in Birmingham, United States, with each men's and women's team that made the quarter-finals earning points for the qualification.

Russia was initially awarded rights to host this edition, but Thailand negotiated to host this edition instead due to celebrating Coronation of King Vajiralongkorn of Thailand. It was the first world championships after International Olympic Committee (IOC) fully recognized International Federation of Muaythai Amateur (IFMA) in the Association of IOC Recognised International Sports Federations (ARISF) in February 2019.

== Schedule ==
All times are local (UTC+7).

P	Preliminary rounds	¼	Quarterfinals	½	Semifinals	F	Final

Date →	Mon 22	Tue 23	Wed 24	Thu 25	Fri 26	Sat 27	Sun 28
Event ↓	Mon 22	Tue 23	Wed 24	Thu 25	Fri 26	Sat 27	Sun 28
Men's 48 kg	P			¼		½	F
Men's 51 kg	P			¼		½	F
Men's 54 kg	P		P		¼	½	F
Men's 57 kg	P		P		¼	½	F
Men's 60 kg		P	P	¼	½	F	
Men's 63.5 kg		P	P	¼	½	F	
Men's 67 kg	P		P		¼	½	F
Men's 71 kg	P			P	¼	½	F
Men's 75 kg		P	P	¼	½	F	
Men's 81 kg		P	P	¼	½	F	
Men's 86 kg	P		P		¼	½	F
Men's 91 kg	P		¼			½	F
Men's +91 kg	P				¼	½	F
Men's U23 48 kg		¼				½	F
Men's U23 51 kg	P		¼			½	F
Men's U23 54 kg		P	P	¼		½	F
Men's U23 57 kg	P	P		¼		½	F
Men's U23 63.5 kg	P		P	¼		½	F
Men's U23 60 kg	P		P	¼		½	F
Men's U23 63.5 kg	P		P	¼		½	F
Men's U23 67 kg		P		¼		½	F
Men's U23 71 kg	P			¼		½	F
Men's U23 75 kg		P		¼		½	F
Men's U23 81 kg	P			¼		½	F
Men's U23 86 kg						½	F
Men's U23 +91 kg	¼					½	F
Women's 45 kg	P		¼			½	F
Women's 48 kg	P		P	¼		½	F
Women's 51 kg	P		¼			½	F
Women's 54 kg	P		¼			½	F
Women's 57 kg	P		¼			½	F
Women's 60 kg	P		¼			½	F
Women's 63.5 kg	P		¼			½	F
Women's 67 kg	¼					½	F
Women's 71 kg	¼					½	F
Women's 75 kg	¼					½	F
Women's +75 kg						½	F
Women's U23 45 kg		¼				½	F
Women's U23 48 kg		P		¼		½	F
Women's U23 51 kg		¼				½	F
Women's U23 54 kg		¼				½	F
Women's U23 57 kg						½	F
Women's U23 60 kg		P		¼		½	F
Women's U23 63.5 kg						F	
Women's U23 67 kg							F
Bouts	85	77	136	76	34	80	38
Time							

== Medal tables ==
=== Overall ===
* Host nation (Thailand)

Rank	Nation	Gold	Silver	Bronze	Total
1	Thailand (THA)*	16	0	8	24
2	Russia (RUS)	8	8	10	26
3	Ukraine (UKR)	2	3	8	13
4	Turkey (TUR)	2	2	5	9
5	Australia (AUS)	2	2	0	4
6	Finland (FIN)	2	1	1	4
7	Vietnam (VIE)	2	0	5	7
8	Belarus (BLR)	1	2	4	7
9	France (FRA)	1	2	0	3
10	Kazakhstan (KAZ)	1	1	3	5
11	Croatia (CRO)	1	1	2	4
12	Israel (ISR)	1	1	1	3
13	China (CHN)	1	1	0	2
14	Canada (CAN)	1	0	2	3
15	Algeria (ALG)	1	0	0	1
15	Greece (GRE)	1	0	0	1
15	Moldova (MDA)	1	0	0	1
18	United States (USA)	0	5	1	6
19	Philippines (PHI)	0	2	3	5
19	Sweden (SWE)	0	2	3	5
21	Czech Republic (CZE)	0	1	2	3
22	Hungary (HUN)	0	1	1	2
22	Malaysia (MAS)	0	1	1	2
22	Peru (PER)	0	1	1	2
22	Uzbekistan (UZB)	0	1	1	2
26	Belgium (BEL)	0	1	0	1
26	Cyprus (CYP)	0	1	0	1
26	Great Britain (GBR)	0	1	0	1
26	Iraq (IRQ)	0	1	0	1
26	Lithuania (LTU)	0	1	0	1
26	Palestine (PLE)	0	1	0	1
32	Afghanistan (AFG)	0	0	4	4
33	Indonesia (INA)	0	0	3	3
34	Germany (GER)	0	0	2	2
34	Jordan (JOR)	0	0	2	2
36	Azerbaijan (AZE)	0	0	1	1
36	Colombia (COL)	0	0	1	1
36	Estonia (EST)	0	0	1	1
36	India (IND)	0	0	1	1
36	Iran (IRI)	0	0	1	1
36	Lebanon (LBN)	0	0	1	1
36	Poland (POL)	0	0	1	1
36	Singapore (SGP)	0	0	1	1
36	Slovakia (SVK)	0	0	1	1
36	Spain (ESP)	0	0	1	1
36	Sri Lanka (SRI)	0	0	1	1
Totals (46 entries)		44	44	84	172

=== Elite A ===
* Host nation (Thailand)

Rank	Nation	Gold	Silver	Bronze	Total
1	Russia (RUS)	7	5	8	20
2	Thailand (THA)*	4	0	5	9
3	Turkey (TUR)	2	2	5	9
3	Ukraine (UKR)	2	2	5	9
5	Finland (FIN)	2	1	0	3
6	Belarus (BLR)	1	2	4	7
7	Australia (AUS)	1	2	0	3
7	France (FRA)	1	2	0	3
9	China (CHN)	1	1	0	2
10	Kazakhstan (KAZ)	1	0	3	4
11	Vietnam (VIE)	1	0	1	2
12	Israel (ISR)	1	0	0	1
13	Sweden (SWE)	0	2	3	5
14	United States (USA)	0	2	0	2
15	Czech Republic (CZE)	0	1	2	3
16	Peru (PER)	0	1	1	2
17	Hungary (HUN)	0	1	0	1
18	Afghanistan (AFG)	0	0	2	2
18	Croatia (CRO)	0	0	2	2
20	Canada (CAN)	0	0	1	1
20	Iran (IRI)	0	0	1	1
20	Lebanon (LBN)	0	0	1	1
20	Poland (POL)	0	0	1	1
20	Slovakia (SVK)	0	0	1	1
20	Spain (ESP)	0	0	1	1
20	Sri Lanka (SRI)	0	0	1	1
Totals (26 entries)		24	24	48	96

=== Competitive Class U23 ===
* Host nation (Thailand)

Rank	Nation	Gold	Silver	Bronze	Total
1	Thailand (THA)*	12	0	3	15
2	Russia (RUS)	1	3	2	6
3	Croatia (CRO)	1	1	0	2
4	Vietnam (VIE)	1	0	4	5
5	Algeria (ALG)	1	0	0	1
5	Australia (AUS)	1	0	0	1
5	China (CHN)	1	0	0	1
5	Greece (GRE)	1	0	0	1
5	Moldova (MDA)	1	0	0	1
10	United States (USA)	0	3	1	4
11	Philippines (PHI)	0	2	3	5
12	Ukraine (UKR)	0	1	3	4
13	Israel (ISR)	0	1	1	2
13	Malaysia (MAS)	0	1	1	2
13	Uzbekistan (UZB)	0	1	1	2
16	Belgium (BEL)	0	1	0	1
16	Cyprus (CYP)	0	1	0	1
16	Great Britain (GBR)	0	1	0	1
16	Iraq (IRQ)	0	1	0	1
16	Kazakhstan (KAZ)	0	1	0	1
16	Lithuania (LTU)	0	1	0	1
16	Palestine (PLE)	0	1	0	1
23	Indonesia (INA)	0	0	3	3
24	Afghanistan (AFG)	0	0	2	2
24	Germany (GER)	0	0	2	2
24	Jordan (JOR)	0	0	2	2
27	Azerbaijan (AZE)	0	0	1	1
27	Canada (CAN)	0	0	1	1
27	Colombia (COL)	0	0	1	1
27	Estonia (EST)	0	0	1	1
27	Finland (FIN)	0	0	1	1
27	Hungary (HUN)	0	0	1	1
27	India (IND)	0	0	1	1
27	Singapore (SGP)	0	0	1	1
Totals (34 entries)		20	20	36	76

== Elite A ==
=== Men's events ===
Event	Gold	Silver	Bronze
−48 kg	Netipong Phrommakhot; Thailand	Ovsep Aslanyan; Russia	Zubeyr Barin; Turkey
−48 kg	Netipong Phrommakhot; Thailand	Ovsep Aslanyan; Russia	Mashal Islamzai; Afghanistan
−51 kg	Charak Murtuzaliev; Russia	Chenghao Luo; China	Bakytzhan Arifkhanov; Kazakhstan
−51 kg	Charak Murtuzaliev; Russia	Chenghao Luo; China	Mikita Mironchyk; Belarus
−54 kg	Detrak Kulsena; Thailand	Nicolas Young; Peru	Kholmurod Rakhimov; Russia
−54 kg	Detrak Kulsena; Thailand	Nicolas Young; Peru	Yelaman Sayassatov; Kazakhstan
−57 kg	Almaz Sarsembekov; Kazakhstan	Aleksandr Abramov; Russia	Nicholas Bryant; Sweden
−57 kg	Almaz Sarsembekov; Kazakhstan	Aleksandr Abramov; Russia	Vladyslav Mykytas; Ukraine
−60 kg	Aik Begian; Russia	Sercan Koc; Turkey	Daniil Yermolenka; Belarus
−60 kg	Aik Begian; Russia	Sercan Koc; Turkey	Nguyễn Trần Duy Nhất; Vietnam
−63.5 kg	Igor Liubchenko; Ukraine	Abdulmalik Mugidinov; Russia	Mohammad yousuf Jahangir; Afghanistan
−63.5 kg	Igor Liubchenko; Ukraine	Abdulmalik Mugidinov; Russia	Kittiphop Mueangprom; Thailand
−67 kg	Thanet Nitutorn; Thailand	Spéth Norbert Atti; Hungary	Dzimitry Varats; Belarus
−67 kg	Thanet Nitutorn; Thailand	Spéth Norbert Atti; Hungary	Erdem Dincer; Turkey
−71 kg	Ilia Balanov; Russia	Oleh Huta; Ukraine	Poonsak Chaumprakhon; Thailand
−71 kg	Ilia Balanov; Russia	Oleh Huta; Ukraine	Jonathan Larsson; Sweden
−75 kg	Jimmy Vienot; France	Volodymyr Baryshev; Ukraine	Nayanesh Parikh Bumba; Spain
−75 kg	Jimmy Vienot; France	Volodymyr Baryshev; Ukraine	Youssef Abboud; Lebanon
−81 kg	Suthat Bunchit; Thailand	Mikita Shostak; Belarus	Surik Magakian; Russia
−81 kg	Suthat Bunchit; Thailand	Mikita Shostak; Belarus	Vasyl Sorokin; Ukraine
−86 kg	Gadzhi Medzhidov; Russia	Yauheni Vauchok; Belarus	Anatolii Sukhanov; Ukraine
−86 kg	Gadzhi Medzhidov; Russia	Yauheni Vauchok; Belarus	Lukasz Radosz; Poland
−91 kg	Oleh Pryimachov; Ukraine	Jakub Klauda; Czech Republic	Weerasinghe Rathnayake Mudiyanselage Thilina Madushanka; Sri Lanka
−91 kg	Oleh Pryimachov; Ukraine	Jakub Klauda; Czech Republic	Nadir Iskhakov; Russia
+91 kg	Buğra Tugay Erdoğan; Turkey	Amine Kebir; France	Viktor Torkotiuk; Ukraine
+91 kg	Buğra Tugay Erdoğan; Turkey	Amine Kebir; France	Kirill Kornilov; Russia

=== Women's events ===
Event	Gold	Silver	Bronze
−45 kg	Alena Liashkevich; Belarus	Satu Mykkänen; Finland	Vera Negodina; Russia
−45 kg	Alena Liashkevich; Belarus	Satu Mykkänen; Finland	Yuliia Diachenko; Ukraine
−48 kg	Tessa Kakkonen; Finland	Sze Sze Rowlinson; Australia	Suphisara Konlak; Thailand
−48 kg	Tessa Kakkonen; Finland	Sze Sze Rowlinson; Australia	Gülistan Turan; Turkey
−51 kg	Bùi Yến Ly; Vietnam	Ekaterina Gurina; Russia	Funda Alkayis; Turkey
−51 kg	Bùi Yến Ly; Vietnam	Ekaterina Gurina; Russia	Monika Chochlikova; Slovakia
−54 kg	Almira Tinchurina; Russia	Coral Carnicella; United States	Viktorie Bulínová; Czech Republic
−54 kg	Almira Tinchurina; Russia	Coral Carnicella; United States	Yadrung Tehiran; Thailand
−57 kg	Maria Klimova; Russia	Anaelle Angerville; France	Taylor McClatchie; Canada
−57 kg	Maria Klimova; Russia	Anaelle Angerville; France	Karolína Klusová; Czech Republic
−60 kg	Nili Block; Israel	Ekaterina Vinnikova; Russia	[[ ]] Ukraine
−60 kg	Nili Block; Israel	Ekaterina Vinnikova; Russia	Darya Bialkova; Belarus
−63.5 kg	Zoe Putorak; Australia	Angela Whitley; United States	Sara Matsson; Sweden
−63.5 kg	Zoe Putorak; Australia	Angela Whitley; United States	Veronika Prokofeva; Russia
−67 kg	Bediha Tacyildiz; Turkey	Emma Stonegard Abrahamsson; Sweden	Anastasiia Nepianidi; Russia
−67 kg	Bediha Tacyildiz; Turkey	Emma Stonegard Abrahamsson; Sweden	Ilmira Kunakhunova; Kazakhstan
−71 kg	Anna Rantanen; Finland	Angela Mamic; Sweden	Mahsa Salehpour; Iran
−71 kg	Anna Rantanen; Finland	Angela Mamic; Sweden	Helena Jurisic; Croatia
−75 kg	Sarah Carter; Canada	Rabia Akdeniz; Turkey	Irina Larionova; Russia
−75 kg	Sarah Carter; Canada	Rabia Akdeniz; Turkey	Lucija Bilobrk; Croatia
+75 kg	Viktoriia Zhbankova; Russia	Jessie-lee Charles; Australia	Arena Castro; Peru
+75 kg	Viktoriia Zhbankova; Russia	Jessie-lee Charles; Australia	Mensure Karadayi; Turkey

== Competitive Class U23 ==
=== Men's events ===
Event	Gold	Silver	Bronze
−48 kg	Naruephon Chittra; Thailand	Mohammad Rifdean Masdor; Malaysia	Kristian Narca; Philippines
−48 kg	Naruephon Chittra; Thailand	Mohammad Rifdean Masdor; Malaysia	Khai Van Khuat; Vietnam
−51 kg	Veerasak Senanue; Thailand	Andrii Latushko; Ukraine	Ibrokhim Mamatkulov; Uzbekistan
−51 kg	Veerasak Senanue; Thailand	Andrii Latushko; Ukraine	Riley Foden; Canada
−54 kg	Sakchai Chamchit; Thailand	Ismail Al Kadhi; Cyprus	Huy Quang Nguyen; Vietnam
−54 kg	Sakchai Chamchit; Thailand	Ismail Al Kadhi; Cyprus	Din Haziza; Israel
−57 kg	Konstantinos Sarkiris; Greece	Davlat Shamsiyev; Uzbekistan	Teerawat Choochanud; Thailand
−57 kg	Konstantinos Sarkiris; Greece	Davlat Shamsiyev; Uzbekistan	Ahmad Hasanzada; Afghanistan
−60 kg	Yahong Chen; China	Yerkanat Ospan; Kazakhstan	Tomas Chaverra; Colombia
−60 kg	Yahong Chen; China	Yerkanat Ospan; Kazakhstan	Linus Lau Yong Lun Lau; Singapore
−63.5 kg	Krisada Takhiankliang; Thailand	Berjan Peposhi; Belgium	Ardiansyah; Indonesia
−63.5 kg	Krisada Takhiankliang; Thailand	Berjan Peposhi; Belgium	Valentin Alex Herceg; Hungary
−67 kg	Adam Larfi; Algeria	Matas Pultarazinskas; Lithuania	Mohammed Mahmoud; Malaysia
−67 kg	Adam Larfi; Algeria	Matas Pultarazinskas; Lithuania	Suchakhri Ruanthai; Thailand
−71 kg	Man Kongsib; Thailand	Alexander Skvortsov; Russia	Abdel Rahman Alsradeih; Jordan
−71 kg	Man Kongsib; Thailand	Alexander Skvortsov; Russia	Vladislav Yeremenko; Ukraine
−75 kg	Sarayut Klinming; Thailand	Elad Danji Suman; Israel	Aleksei Fedotov; Russia
−75 kg	Sarayut Klinming; Thailand	Elad Danji Suman; Israel	Abdullah El Bakkaoui; Germany
−81 kg	Saknarong Suklerd; Thailand	Mustafa Al Tekreeti; Iraq	Yegor Skurikhin; Ukraine
−81 kg	Saknarong Suklerd; Thailand	Mustafa Al Tekreeti; Iraq	Abdallah Al Jabareen; Jordan
−86 kg	Nicolai Caraus; Moldova	Ahmad Hilal; Palestine	Lucas Drews; United States
−86 kg	Nicolai Caraus; Moldova	Ahmad Hilal; Palestine	Amil Shahmarzade; Azerbaijan
−91 kg	Withdrawn event		
+91 kg	Petar Dreznjak; Croatia	Sullivan Cauley; United States	Serhii Bodnarchuk; Ukraine
+91 kg	Petar Dreznjak; Croatia	Sullivan Cauley; United States	Jan Beljajev; Estonia

=== Women's events ===
Event	Gold	Silver	Bronze
−45 kg	Ha Huu Hieu Huynh; Vietnam	Rudzma Abubakar; Philippines	Ketmanee Chasing; Thailand
−45 kg	Ha Huu Hieu Huynh; Vietnam	Rudzma Abubakar; Philippines	Viktoriia Kogalenok; Russia
−48 kg	Thanawan Thongduang; Thailand	Kennedy-Reilly Maze; United States	Freshta Sherzad; Afghanistan
−48 kg	Thanawan Thongduang; Thailand	Kennedy-Reilly Maze; United States	Colleen Saddi; Philippines
−51 kg	Sutathip Thongtriphan; Thailand	Sofia Bakhtereva; Russia	Liane Benito; Philippines
−51 kg	Sutathip Thongtriphan; Thailand	Sofia Bakhtereva; Russia	Thuy Phuong Thi Trieu; Vietnam
−54 kg	Ekaterina Popova; Russia	Danielle Fall; United Kingdom	Luh Mas Sri Diana Wati; Indonesia
−54 kg	Ekaterina Popova; Russia	Danielle Fall; United Kingdom	Sanni Nurminen; Finland
−57 kg	Sirisopa Sirisak; Thailand	Jenelyn Olsim; Philippines	Jayaram Alva Anwitha; India
−57 kg	Sirisopa Sirisak; Thailand	Jenelyn Olsim; Philippines	Angelina Runtukahu; Indonesia
−60 kg	Kesinee Tabtrai; Thailand	Selina Flores; United States	Thuy Thi Han; Vietnam
−60 kg	Kesinee Tabtrai; Thailand	Selina Flores; United States	Viktorija Molcanova; Germany
−63.5 kg	Kaewrudee Kamtakrapoom; Thailand	Nikolina Vidackovic; Croatia	Not awarded
−67 kg	Georgia Smith; Australia	Tatiana Sharkova; Russia	Not awarded
−71 kg	Withdrawn event		
−75 kg	Withdrawn event		
+75 kg	Withdrawn event		

== Royal team trophies ==
The first place of team ranking will hold a trophy donated by King Vajiralongkorn of Thailand.

=== Men ===
Rank	Team	Points
1		
2		
3		
4		
5		
6		
7		
8		
9		
10		

=== Women ===
Rank	Team	Points
1		
2		
3		
4		
5		
6		
7		
8		
9		
10		

== Participating nations ==
A total of 600 athletes from 87 nations and two IFMA team competed.

- Afghanistan (13)
- Algeria (12)
- Argentina (1)
- Armenia (2)
- Australia (14)
- Austria (3)
- Azerbaijan (1)
- Belarus (15)
- Belgium (2)
- Bosnia and Herzegovina (1)
- Brazil (5)
- Bulgaria (2)
- Canada (10)
- China (7)
- Chinese Taipei (6)
- Colombia (8)
- Croatia (6)
- Cyprus (3)
- Czech Republic (7)
- Ecuador (1)
- Egypt (1)
- Estonia (2)
- Finland (9)
- France (13)
- Georgia (1)
- Germany (7)
- Greece (9)
- Honduras (1)
- Hong Kong (7)
- Hungary (4)
- (International Olympic Committee) IFMA India Invited Team (2)
- (International Olympic Committee) IFMA Pakistan Invited Team (9)
- India (12)
- Indonesia (11)
- Iran (6)
- Iraq (9)
- Israel (8)
- Italy (10)
- Ivory Coast (1)
- Japan (1)
- Jordan (4)
- Kazakhstan (13)
- Kosovo (1)
- Kyrgyzstan (5)
- Lebanon (2)
- Libya (9)
- Lithuania (3)
- Macau (2)
- Malaysia (7)
- Mauritius (2)
- Mexico (9)
- Moldova (1)
- Mongolia (1)
- Morocco (9)
- Nepal (5)
- Netherlands (2)
- New Zealand (5)
- North Macedonia (2)
- Norway (1)
- Pakistan (1)
- Palestine (8)
- Peru (8)
- Philippines (15)
- Poland (9)
- Portugal (8)
- Russia (33)
- Serbia (2)
- Singapore (7)
- Slovakia (5)
- Slovenia (3)
- South Africa (5)
- South Korea (1)
- Spain (6)
- Sri Lanka (2)
- Sweden (19)
- Switzerland (1)
- Tajikistan (2)
- Thailand (30) (host)
- Tunisia (1)
- Turkey (24)
- Turkmenistan (5)
- Ukraine (24)
- United Arab Emirates (11)
- United Kingdom (4)
- United States (11)
- United States Virgin Islands (1)
- Uzbekistan (12)
- Vietnam (17)
- Zimbabwe (1)
