= Gloria Ford Gilmer =

American mathematician (1928–2021)

Gloria Gilmer
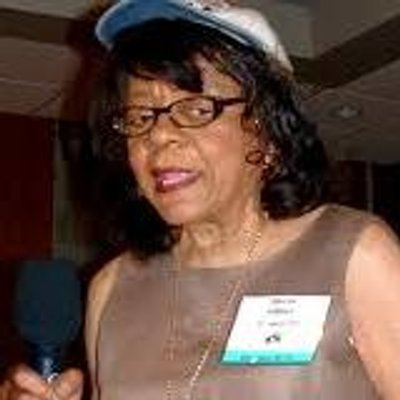
- Gilmer in 2020
- Born: June 28, 1928; New York
- Died: August 25, 2021 (aged 93); Urban Air
- Education: Morgan State University; University of Pennsylvania; Marquette University
- Known for: Ethnomathematics
- Scientific career
- Fields: Mathematics, Ethnomathematics, Education
- Thesis: "Effects Of Small Discussion Groups On Self-Paced Instruction In a Developmental Algebra Course" (1978)

Gloria C. Gilmer (née Ford; June 28, 1928 – August 25, 2021) was an American mathematician and educator, notable for being the first African American woman to publish a non-PhD thesis.

== Early life and education ==
Gilmer was born in Baltimore, Maryland on June 28, 1928. She studied for her Bachelor of Science degree at Morgan State University, where she was part of the class of 1949. While there, she published two papers with her supervisor Luna Mishoe; these were the first two research papers published by an African American woman, being published in 1956, under her maiden name of Gloria C. Ford. She was also a student of Clarence Stephens while there.

After receiving her MA in Mathematics at the University of Pennsylvania, she went to work on ballistics research at the Aberdeen Proving Ground, and later to teach at six HBCUs. She studied for a PhD at the University of Wisconsin-Madison, but left after a year, later citing "a marriage, children, and the necessity to earn a living". Between 1965 and 1966, Gilmer became the first African American mathematics instructor at the Milwaukee Area Technical College and the first Black woman to teach mathematics at the University of Wisconsin–Milwaukee. She subsequently gained a PhD from Marquette University, in Education Administration. The title of her dissertation is "Effects Of Small Discussion Groups On Self-Paced Instruction In a Developmental Algebra Course".

== Post-doctoral career ==
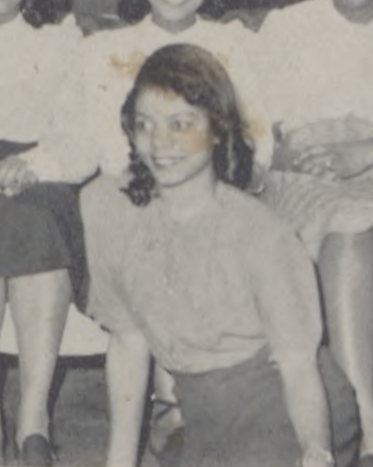
Gilmer in 1948

Much of Gilmer's work has been in ethnomathematics; she was described as a "leader in the field" by Scott W. Williams, a mathematics professor at SUNY Buffalo.

An example of this research is when, based on fieldwork in New York and Baltimore, Gilmer and her assistants, 14-year-old Stephanie Desgrottes and teacher Mary Potter, observed and interviewed both hair stylists and customers in the two cities' salons, inquiring about tessellations in box braids (box-shaped tessellations resembling brick walls) and triangular braids (tessellations resembling equilateral triangles), two styles that restrict the movement of the hair when the head is tossed. While these hair stylists do not generally think of what they do as mathematical, Gilmer detailed the many mathematically based patterns in these and other types of braiding and how they are found in nature, such as the tessellating hexagons found in braids that resembles the flesh of pineapples and the honeycombs in beehives. As an educator, Gilmer used these results to create classroom activities for students to understand the mathematics of hair braiding.

In the early 1980s, Gilmer was the first African American woman to be on the board of governors of the Mathematical Association of America. Between 1981 and 1984, Gilmer was a research associate at the United States Department of Education, where she was part of the Office of Educational Research and Improvement. Gilmer traveled to Adelaide, Australia in 1984 to attend the Fifth International Commission of Mathematical Education (ICME-5) to present on improvements to the IEA Mathematics Study, an international mathematics assessment test. In 1985 she co-founded and the executive board of International Study Group on Ethnomathematics (ISGEm), of which she was the President from 1985 to 1996. She was also the second person, and first woman, to give the National Association of Mathematicians' Cox-Talbot lecture, which was named in honour of the first and fourth African Americans to receive PhDs in mathematics.

In 2008, Gilmer became the president of Math-Tech, a corporation that aims to take new research material and create more effective mathematics curricula, particularly with respect to women and minorities.

In 2022, Gilmer became the first Black woman mathematician to have her papers archived in the Manuscript Division of the Library of Congress.

== Death ==
Gilmer died on August 25, 2021, at the age of 93, in the city of Milwaukee, in the state of Wisconsin.

== List of published works ==
- "On the Limit of the Coefficients of the Eigenfunction Series Associated with a Certain Non-self-adjoint Differential System," with Luna I. Mishoe. Proceedings of the American Mathematical Society 7.2 (1956): 260.
- "On the Uniform Convergence of a Certain Eigenfunction Series," with Luna Mishoe. Pacific Journal of Mathematics 6.2 (1956): 271–78.
- "Effects Of Small Discussion Groups On Self-Paced Instruction In a Developmental Algebra Course" (1978). Dissertations (1962-2010) Access via Proquest Digital Dissertations. AAI7905173. https://epublications.marquette.edu/dissertations/AAI7905173
- "Mathematical Patterns in African American Hairstyles." Presented at the 77th Annual Meeting of the National Council of Teachers in Mathematics (1998).
- "Ethnomathematics: An African American Perspective On Developing Women In Mathematics." In Changing the Faces of Mathematics: Perspectives on Gender. National Council of Teachers of Mathematics (2001). (ISBN 978-0-87353-496-3)

== Awards ==
The American Mathematical Society (AMS) has a mid-career research fellowship, the Claytor-Gilmer Fellowship, named after Gilmer and William Schieffelin Claytor.
