= Thyrsa Frazier Svager =

American mathematician (1930–1999)

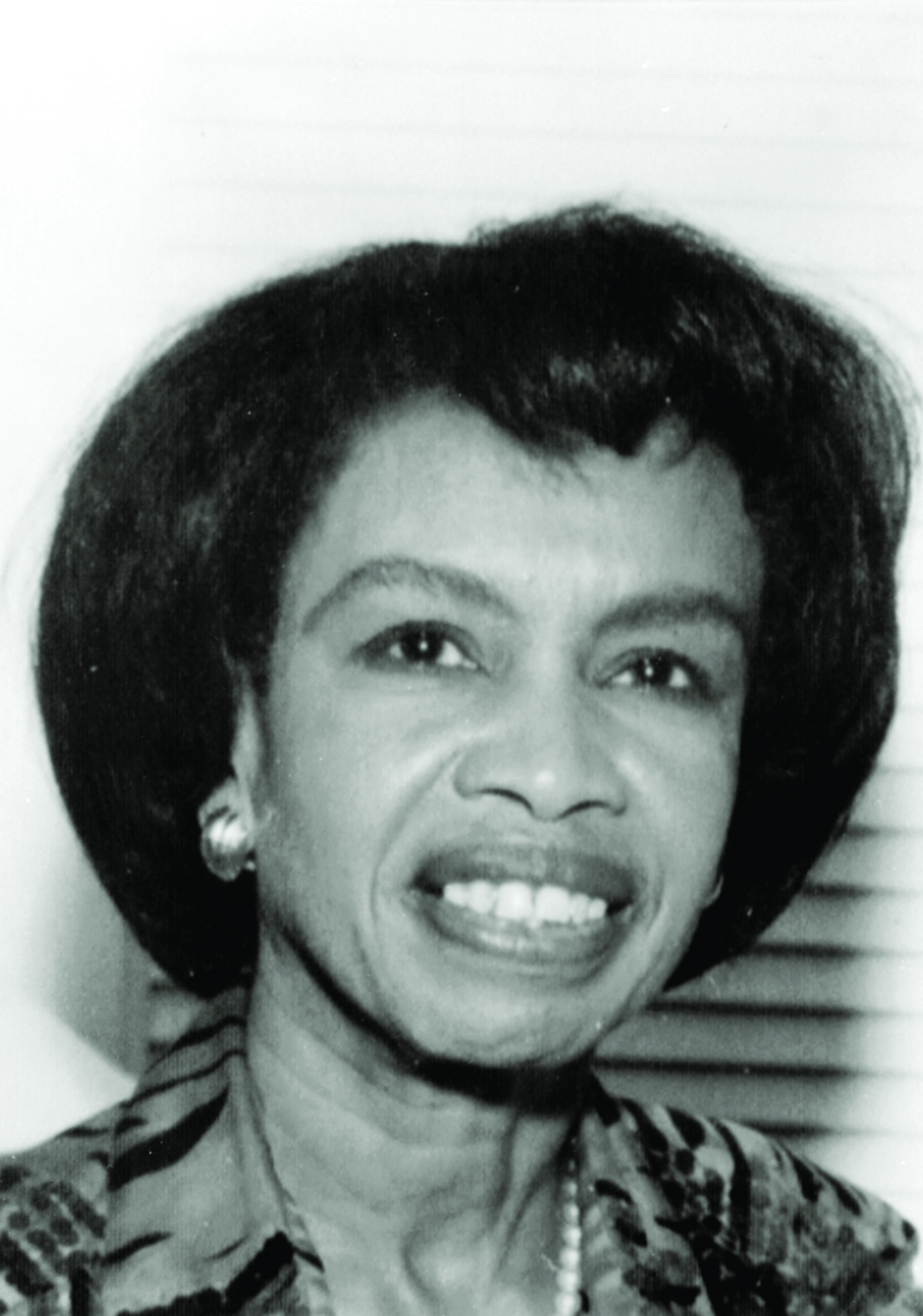
- Born: Thyrsa Anne Frazier; June 16, 1930; Wilberforce, Ohio
- Died: July 23, 1999 (aged 69)
- Education: Antioch College; Ohio State University
- Known for: One of the first African-American woman PhDs in mathematics; Scholarship fund for African-American women in mathematics
- Scientific career
- Fields: Mathematics
- Workplaces: Wright-Patterson Air Force Base; Texas Southern University; Central State University

Thyrsa Anne Frazier Svager (June 16, 1930 – July 23, 1999) was an American academic who was the first African-American woman to earn a PhD in mathematics from Ohio State University. She was also the tenth African-American woman in the United States to earn this degree. Born in Ohio, she graduated from high school at the age of 16, going to Antioch College in Ohio and then doing her postgraduate degrees at Ohio State University. Frazier Svager was the head of the Department of Mathematics at Central State University (CSU) in Ohio for decades, ending her academic career as provost and dean for academic affairs. She and her husband, physics professor Aleksandar Svager, invested one of their salaries during their careers to build a legacy for scholarships. After her death, the Thyrsa Frazier Svager Fund was established to provide scholarships for African-American women majoring in mathematics.

== Early life and education ==
Frazier Svager was born Thyrsa Anne Frazier on June 16, 1930, in Wilberforce, Ohio. Her mother, Elizabeth Anne Frazier, taught speech at Central State University (CSU), a historically black university in Wilberforce, Ohio. Her father, G. Thuton Frazier, headed the Logistics Department at the Wright-Patterson Air Force Base in Dayton, Ohio. He was a member of the Kappa Alpha Psi fraternity, holding the position of Provence Polemarch. Frazier Svager had three sisters, Gail, Constance and Jane, and a brother, William Lafayette.

Frazier Svager graduated from Wilberforce University Preparatory Academy in Ohio at the age of 16 in 1947, as class valedictorian. She attended Antioch College, a private liberal arts college in Yellow Springs, Ohio, majoring in mathematics, with a minor in chemistry, and placed in the 99th percentile in the Princeton Senior Student Examination. Frazier Svager was one of only four black students at Antioch: one of the others was Coretta Scott King, with whom she was friends.

She gained a Bachelor of Arts degree from Antioch in 1951, going on to gain a master's (1952) and PhD from Ohio State University (OSU) in Columbus in 1965, where Paul Reichelderfer was her doctoral advisor. Her dissertation was titled "On the product of absolutely continuous transformations of measure spaces".

== Career ==
Frazier Svager worked for a year at Wright-Patterson Air Force Base in Dayton, before teaching at Texas Southern University in Houston. In 1954, she joined the faculty of CSU in Wilberforce.

In 1967, Frazier Svager was appointed chairman of the department of mathematics. She was awarded tenure in 1970. She spent a summer in DC in 1966 as a systems analyst at NASA, as visiting faculty at MIT in 1969, and in 1985, she undertook postdoctoral study at OSU during the summer. She was provost and vice president for academic affairs when she retired in 1993. In March 1995, she returned for a short time to CSU as Interim President.

Frazier Svager was active on the issue of scholarships, serving as the president of the local chapter of MOLES, a national association that provided scholarships for college students. She was also a member of Beta Kappa Chi, the National Association of Mathematicians, and the Mathematical Association of America, and was involved with Jack and Jill of America. Frazier Svager participated in the meeting that founded the National Association of Mathematics in 1969.

She wrote two books, CSU's Modern Elementary Algebra Workbook (1969), and Essential Mathematics for College Freshmen (1976).

== Personal life ==
While on the CSU faculty, Frazier met Aleksandar Svager, a Holocaust survivor from Yugoslavia and physics professor at CSU. They married in June 1968 at her parents' home.

Thyrsa Frazier Svager died on July 23, 1999.

== Philanthropy ==
Both university professors with a strong commitment to furthering education opportunities, the Svagers lived on one income, investing the other to build a scholarship fund. After her death, her husband established the Thyrsa Frazier Svager Fund at the Dayton Foundation, for African-American women who major in mathematics at one of six universities, with a legacy contribution planned. As of February 2017, 33 women had received support from the Fund. An annual contribution is also being made to the American Physical Society's Minority Scholarship. Alongside her professional career, Thyrsa was active as a member of various civil and social organizations. She was a member of, among others, Alpha Kappa Alpha sorority, Twentieth Century Club, Wilberforce Chapter of Moles, and Volunteers of the African American Museum.

== Honors ==
Frazier Svager was honored with an Honorary Doctor of Humane Letters by CSU on her retirement, and she was inducted into the Hall of Fame in Greene County, Ohio.
