= Mary DeCongé-Watson =

American mathematician (1933–2025)

Mary Lovenia DeCongé Watson
- Born: Mary Lovenia DeCongé; October 4, 1933; Louisiana, U.S.
- Died: July 26, 2025 (aged 91)
- Other names: also known as Vivienne; formerly known as Sister Mary Sylvester DeCongé
- Employer: Southern University
- Spouse(s): Roy Watson, Sr. (married 1983)

Mary Lovenia DeCongé-Watson (October 4, 1933 – July 26, 2025) was an American mathematician and former religious sister in the Sisters of the Holy Family. She was the 15th African-American woman to earn her Ph.D. in mathematics.

== Early life and education ==
DeCongé-Watson was born in 1933 in Wickliff, Louisiana as the seventh of nine children of Adina Rodney DeCongé and Alphonse Frank DeCongé. She joined the Sisters of the Holy Family at age 16, later becoming a sister in the Holy Order of the Sisters of Saint Francis. Between 1952 and 1955, DeCongé taught elementary school in parochial schools in Baton Rouge and Lafayette. She then attended Seton Hill College where she studied mathematics and French (with minors in English, psychology, and history) and was the second Black student to attend the school.

After graduating from Seton Hall in 1959, DeCongé-Watson taught French and math at Holy Ghost High School in Opelousas, Louisiana, until 1961.

In 1962, DeCongé-Watson received a master's degree in mathematics from Louisiana State University. She opted to take a break from her studies and teach at DeLisle Junior College in New Orleans from 1963 to 1964. She then started her PhD studies Tulane University, studying there for one semester.

Although delayed by a long illness in the midst of her graduate career, in 1968, DeConge-Watson received her Ph.D. in mathematics and a minor in French from St. Louis University for her dissertation 2-Normed Lattices and 2-Metric Spaces.

== Career ==
While in graduate school, DeCongé-Watson worked as a teacher at Holy Ghost High School in Opelousas, Louisiana and DeLilse Junior College in New Orleans. After receiving her Ph.D. she worked as an assistant professor of mathematics at Loyola University New Orleans from 1968 to 1971. In 1971 she became an assistant professor at Southern University in Baton Rouge. In 1982, she became a full professor and was appointed Chair of the Department of Mathematics at Southern University in 1986.

DeCongé-Watson spent many years training elementary school teachers for their math competency exams. She wrote an unpublished text as part of the training program.

DeCongé-Watson served as the director of the Center for Minorities in Science, Engineering, and Technology at Southern University and the A&M College System from 1995 to 1998. Following a short retirement, she returned to Southern University in various positions before entering a complete retirement in 2004.

DeCongé-Watson has had her work published in Proceedings of the National Academy of Sciences, The Notices of the American Mathematical Society, and the Journal of Mathematical Analytical Applications. She is known for her publications related to Cauchy's Problem for Higher-Order Abstract Parabolic Equations.

== Personal life and death ==
DeCongé-Watson left the Sisters of the Holy Family in 1976. She married Roy Watson Sr. in 1983 and had four step-children.

DeCongé-Watson died on July 26, 2025 at the age of 91.
