= Geraldine Darden =

American mathematician

Geraldine Claudette Darden (born July 22, 1936) is an American mathematician. She was the fourteenth African American woman to earn a Ph.D. in mathematics.

== Early life and education ==
Darden was born in Nansemond County, Virginia. Darden earned a bachelor's degrees in mathematics in 1957 from the Hampton Institute, a historically black institute, and took a teaching position at S.H. Clarke Junior High School in Portsmouth, Virginia. In the summer of 1958, Darden saw an opportunity for aspiring mathematicians created by the launch of Russian satellite Sputnik and ensuing US interest in mathematics and science a year earlier, and she applied for and received a National Science Foundation grant to attend the Summer Institute in Mathematics held at North Carolina Central University. Here she met Marjorie Lee Browne, the mathematician who directed the institute, who would encourage Darden to go on to graduate school.

Darden earned a master's degree in 1960 at the University of Illinois at Urbana–Champaign, and a second master's degree in 1965 and Ph.D. in 1967 from Syracuse University. Her dissertation was completed under the supervision of James Reid, "On the Direct Sums of Cyclic Groups".

== Contributions ==
In addition to teaching, Darden also co-wrote Selected Papers on Pre-calculus, with textbook author Tom Apostol, Gulbank D. Chakerian, and John D. Neff.
