= Elgy Morales =

Costa Rican football coach (born 1975)

Personal information
- Full name: Elgy Fabricio Morales Herrera
- Date of birth: 21 September 1975 (age 51)
- Place of birth: San José, Costa Rica
- Position: Midfielder

Team information
- Current team: Fraigcomar

International career
Years	Team	Apps	(Gls)
- Puerto Rico (COACH)

Managerial career
- 2012-(Current): CF Fraigcomar
- Puerto Rico (2021-)
- Puerto Rico U20 (2019-2021): Bayamón FC (Unknown)

Elgy Fabricio Morales Herrera (born on 21 September 1975) is a Costa Rican football coach. Elgy Morales is a football coach coaching the U11 team of Fraigcomar CF. He is also the player selectionist for the Puerto Rican National Football Team. Elgy is also coach of the team.
