= Louise Nixon Sutton =

African-American mathematician

- Born: November 4, 1925; Hertford, North Carolina
- Died: May 14, 2006 (aged 80); At home, Hertford, North Carolina
- Education: North Carolina Agricultural and Technical State University; New York University
- Known for: First African-American PhD in mathematics from NYU; First chair ECSU Department of Physical Sciences and Mathematics
- Scientific career
- Fields: Mathematician and professor
- Workplaces: Elizabeth City State University (ECSU)

Louise Nixon Sutton (November 4, 1925 – May 14, 2006) was a mathematician. She was the first African-American woman to be awarded a PhD in mathematics education by New York University, and the first chair of the Department of Physical Sciences and Mathematics at Elizabeth City State University.

== Early life and education ==
Sutton was born in Hertford, North Carolina. Her parents were Annie McNair Nixon and John Calhoun Nixon, and she had three brothers: John Stuart Nixon, Norris Lee Nixon, and Thomas Rufus Nixon. She gained a B.S. from the North Carolina Agricultural and Technical State University in 1946, and an MA from New York University in 1951. She was awarded the first PhD in mathematics education to an African American at New York University in 1962, for a dissertation titled Concept learning in trigonometry and analytic geometry at the college level: a comparative study of two methods of teaching trigonometry and analytic geometry at the college level.

== Career ==
After gaining her degrees, Sutton taught mathematics at James B. Dudley High School in Greensboro, North Carolina, from 1946 to 1947. She was very interested in math at school. From 1947 to 1954 she was assistant professor at North Carolina A&T State University, before moving to hold the same position at Delaware State College from 1957 to 1962.

In 1962 she became Professor and Chair of the Physical Sciences and Mathematics Department at Elizabeth City State University in Elizabeth City, North Carolina.

Sutton was a member of the North Carolina A&T State University Alumni Association, Delta Sigma Theta sorority, National Association of University Women, and the National Council of Teachers of Mathematics. She was Chairperson of the National Association of University Women from 1977 to 1978, and a member of Alpha Kappa Mu, and Beta Kappa Chi Scientific Society.

== Personal life ==
Sutton died at home in Hertford, North Carolina, on May 14, 2006. She had been an active member of the St. Paul A.M.E. Zion Church, NAACP, George Washington Carver Floral Club, Arabia Court No. 35 of Daughters of Isis, and the North Carolina State Retired Employees Association.
