= Eleanor Jones =

American mathematician (1929–2021)

Eleanor Green Dawley Jones
- Born: August 10, 1929; Norfolk, VA
- Died: March 1, 2021 (aged 91)
- Education: Booker T. Washington High School Howard University Syracuse University
- Scientific career
- Workplaces: Hampton University Norfolk State University
- Thesis: Abelian Groups and Their Endomorphism Rings, and the Direct Decomposition and Quasi-Endomorphisms of Torsion Free Abelian Groups (1966)
- Doctoral advisor: James Dolan Reid

Eleanor Green Dawley Jones (10 August 1929 - 1 March 2021) was an American mathematician. She was one of the first African-American women to achieve a Ph.D. in mathematics. Jones worked as a consultant for the development of college mathematics curriculums, and as a speaker at events to encourage women and minorities to pursue careers in science and mathematics.

== Early life ==
Jones was born to George Herbert Green and Lillian Vaughn Green on August 10 of 1929 in Norfolk, Virginia. She was the second of six children, all of whom went on to earn, at minimum, a bachelor's degree. Jones attended Booker T. Washington High School, a segregated public school. Jones began her academic career early, after graduating as valedictorian of her high school in 1945 at the age of 15. She then attended Howard University with two scholarships, one from the university and one from the Pepsi-Cola Corporation. Jones was fortunate to be mentored by Elbert Frank Cox, the first African-American person to receive a Ph.D. in mathematics, as well as David Blackwell, another notable African-American mathematician. In addition to Jones majoring in mathematics, she minored in physics and education. She graduated cum laude from Howard University in 1949 and completed her master's degree the following year.

== Career ==
After completing her master's degree, Jones went back to Booker T. Washington High School, this time to teach. In addition to her role as an educator, she developed a new curriculum for the high school's mathematics program. Jones wed Edward Dawley Jr. in 1951 and took time off from teaching in 1953 to start a family. She returned to teaching in 1955, this time as a mathematics instructor at Hampton Institute (presently Hampton University), near Norfolk. In 1957, when all-white public schools were integrated, the segregated public schools in Norfolk were closed. This left many African-American youth with no place to attend school, leading Jones to begin tutoring these students at Norfolk's First Baptist Church. Jones also became active in the civil rights movement, achieving the rank of vice chair in Virginia's branch of CORE (Congress for Racial Equality) from 1958 to 1960. Following a divorce, Jones decided to pursue a doctorate, as Hampton Institute would only give tenure to instructors with doctorates. At the time, Virginia did not permit black students to pursue doctorates in the state, so Jones relocated with her two sons to Syracuse University in New York in 1962. She received a National Science Foundation fellowship in 1963 and began to work as a teaching assistant at Syracuse University. Jones received her doctorate in 1966.

As an associate professor, Jones returned to the Hampton Institute for the 1966–67 academic year, until she joined the Norfolk State University mathematics department in 1967. Jones continued to teach at NSU for more than 30 years, where she continued her education through summer postgraduate courses at New York State University in 1957, at the University of Southern California in 1959–60, and at the University of Oregon in 1971.

== Education and research ==
In 1945, Jones attended Howard University with two scholarships, one from the university and one from the Pepsi-Cola Corporation. Jones was fortunate to be mentored by Elbert Frank Cox, the first African American to receive a Ph.D. in mathematics, as well as David Blackwell, another notable African-American mathematician. In addition to Jones majoring in mathematics, she minored in physics and education. She graduated cum laude from Howard University in 1949 and completed her master's degree the following year. Following a divorce from Edward Armistead Dawley Jr., Jones decided to pursue a doctorate, as Hampton Institute would only give tenure to instructors with doctorates. At the time, Virginia did not permit black students to pursue doctorates in the state, so Jones relocated with her two sons to Syracuse University in New York in 1962. She received a National Science Foundation fellowship in 1963 and began to work as a teaching assistant at Syracuse University to support her family. Jones received her doctorate in 1966. In 1966, under the supervision of James D. Reid, PhD., Jones wrote her thesis entitled "Abelian Groups and Their Endomorphism Rings and the Quasi-Endomorphisms of Torsion Free Abelian Groups."

== Awards and distinctions ==
In 1965, she was elected to the Sigma Xi science honour society in Syracuse University, and became a full member in 1985. In 1975, Dr. Jones was elected Vice President of NAM. In 1994, Jones received the National Association of Mathematicians Distinguished Service Award. 1983-86: Sat on the board of governors of the Mathematical Association of America. 1989-94: Board member of the Association for Women in Mathematics. Since 1990, she has served on the committee for opportunities in mathematics for underrepresented minorities for the American Mathematical Society.

Dr. Eleanor Green Dawley-Jones died in Virginia Beach on 1 March 2021.

== Selected published work ==
- Kenschaft, P. C., & Keith, S. (1991). Winning Women into Mathematics. Washington: D.C.
- Newell, V. K. (1980). Black Mathematicians and Their Works. Ardmore, PA: Dorrance.
