= Lloyd Demetrius =

American mathematician

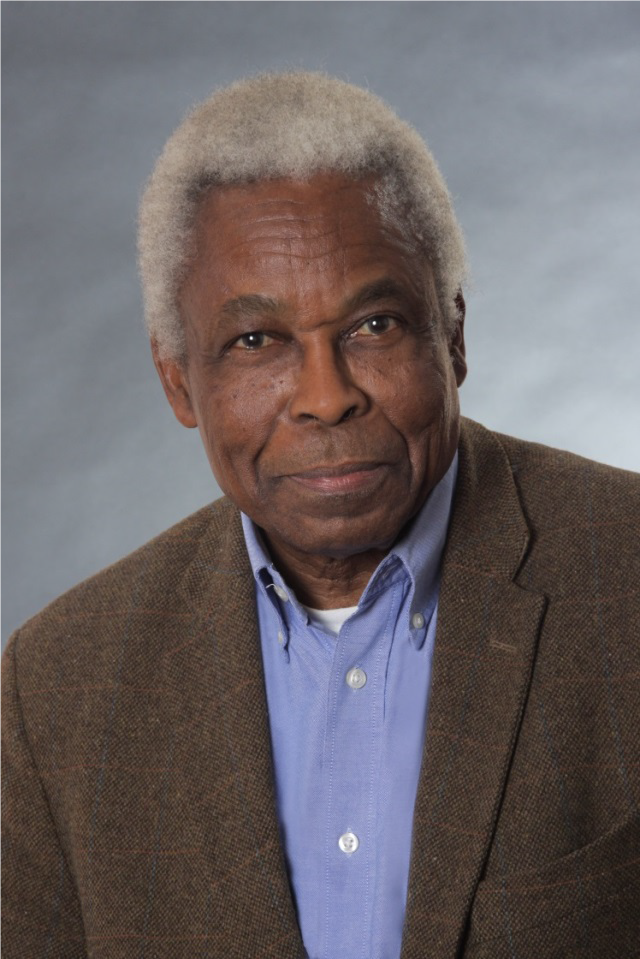
- Lloyd Demetrius in 2015
- Education: University of Cambridge; University of Chicago
- Known for: Evolutionary entropy, Directionality Theory and Quantum Metabolism
- Scientific career
- Fields: Mathematician and theoretical biologist
- Workplaces: Harvard University, MIT, Max-Planck-Institute for Biophysical Chemistry, Max-Planck-Institute for Molecular Genetics, University of Cambridge

Lloyd A. Demetrius is an American mathematician and theoretical biologist at the Department of Organismic and Evolutionary Biology, Harvard University. He is best known for the discovery of the concept of evolutionary entropy, a statistical parameter that characterizes Darwinian fitness in models of evolutionary processes at various levels of biological organization – molecular, organismic and social. Evolutionary entropy, a generalization of the Gibbs-Boltzmann entropy in statistical thermodynamics, is the cornerstone of directionality theory, an analytical study of evolution by variation and selection. The theory has applications to: a) the development of aging and the evolution of longevity; b) the origin and progression of age related diseases such as cancer, and neurodegenerative disorders such as Alzheimer's disease and Parkinson's disease; c) the evolution of cooperation and the origin of economic inequality.

== Education ==
Born in Jamaica, Lloyd Demetrius studied mathematics at the University of Cambridge, England, where he obtained his bachelor's and master's degree. He received his PhD in mathematical biology from the University of Chicago in 1967. Following his doctoral studies, he held a postdoctoral research position at the University of California, Berkeley.

== Career ==
Demetrius was a faculty member in mathematics departments at the University of California, Berkeley, Brown University and Rutgers University in the USA from 1969 to 1979, and a research scientist at the Max-Planck-Institute for Biophysical Chemistry, Göttingen and the Max-Planck-Institute for Molecular Genetics, Berlin. Since 1990, he has been with the Department of Organismic and Evolutionary Biology, Harvard University, first as a visiting professor (1990–1992), and then as an associate in population genetics. He has held visiting professorships at MIT, University of Paris, and was an occupant of a Chaire Municipale, a distinguished visiting professorship at the University of Grenoble. He held a 2024 Beaufort Fellowship in Mathematics at St John's College, Cambridge University.

== Evolutionary entropy and directionality theory ==
The primary achievements of Demetrius are the discovery of the concept evolutionary entropy, and the development of directionality theory, a study of the collective properties and evolutionary dynamics of aggregates of organic matter – macromolecules, cells, higher organisms – on the basis of their microscopic structure.

Demetrius has shown that evolutionary entropy is related to the thermodynamic entropy of Ludwig Boltzmann and J.W. Gibbs, and directionality theory is the natural extension of statistical mechanics, the study of the collective behaviour of inorganic matter.

Statistical mechanics, one of the pillars of modern physics, is concerned with deducing the thermodynamic properties of aggregates of inanimate matter from its microstructure. The theory, which is based on the statistical measure thermodynamic entropy, is restricted to the study of collective behaviour in physical and chemical systems whose cooperativity can be effectively measured by thermodynamic entropy.

The directionality theory of Demetrius pertains to organic matter. It is a phenomelogical and analytic theory based on evolutionary entropy as a measure of the cooperativity between the entities that compose the microstructure. It is an extension of the methodology of statistical mechanics to the study of collective and evolutionary behaviour in biological systems.

A cornerstone of directionality theory is the entropic selection principle. The changes in evolutionary entropy due to the process of variation and selection are determined by the energy source and the resource endowment:

Evolutionary entropy increases in systems driven by a stable energy source and decreases in systems driven by an unstable energy source.

== Directionality theory and the second law of thermodynamics ==
Demetrius has exploited the entropic selection principle to solve a long-standing problem at the interface of physics and biology. Rudolf Clausius showed that the phenomenological fact: Heat flows spontaneously from hotter bodies to colder bodies – the second law of thermodynamics – implies the existence of a property of matter which he called entropy. The major achievement of Boltzmann was the statistical mechanics rationale of the second law. Boltzmann's explanation was achieved by introducing the statistical parameter thermodynamic entropy, and relating this statistical measure of cooperativity with the Clausius entropy, a phenomenological construct. Boltzmann's explanation of the second law was based on the celebrated theorem of statistical mechanics.

Demetrius has reconciled the second law of thermodynamics, which pertains to energy transformation in inorganic matter, with the fundamental theorem of evolution, which refers to energy transformation in organic matter. This is achieved by establishing that the directionality principle for evolutionary entropy and the second law coincide when the resource production rate that drives the evolutionary system tends to zero, and the number of degrees of freedom of the evolutionary system tends to infinity. This relation, Demetrius has shown, provides a conceptual framework for understanding the origin of life: the transition from an abiotic system, defined by inorganic matter – solids, liquids and gases – to the emergence of organized chemical assemblies capable of Darwinian evolution.

== Selected Publications ==
Perron-Frobenius theory and positive operators

- Demetrius, L. (1974). "Invariant Ideals of Positive Operators". SIAM Review, 16(4), 428–440. doi:10.1137/1016083
- Demetrius, L. (1982). "Regular ideals and commuting positive operators". Journal of Mathematical Analysis and Applications, 88(1), 100–103. doi:10.1016/0022-247X(82)90178-0
- Arnold, L., Gundlach, V. M., & Demetrius, L. (1994). "Evolutionary Formalism for Products of Positive Random Matrices". The Annals of Applied Probability, 4(3), 859–901. doi:10.1214/aoap/1177004975

Directionality theory

- Demetrius, L., Gundlach, V. M., & Ochs, G. (2009). "Invasion exponents in biological networks". Physica A: Statistical Mechanics and its Applications, 388(5), 651–672. doi:10.1016/j.physa.2008.10.048
- Demetrius, L. (2013). "Boltzmann, Darwin and Directionality Theory". Physics Reports, 530(1), 1–85. Bibcode:2013PhR...530....1D doi:10.1016/j.physrep.2013.04.001
- Demetrius, L., & Wolf, C. (2022). "Directionality Theory and the Second Law of Thermodynamics". Physica A: Statistical Mechanics and its Applications, 598, 127325. doi:10.1016/j.physa.2022.127325
- Demetrius, L. (2024). "Directionality theory and the origin of life". Royal Society Open Science, 11(11), 230623. doi:10.1098/rsos.230623

Quantum metabolism

- Demetrius, L. (2003). "Quantum statistics and allometric scaling of organisms". Physica A: Statistical Mechanics and its Applications, 322, 477–490. doi:10.1016/S0378-4371(03)00013-X
- Demetrius, L., & Tuszynski, J. A. (2010). "Quantum metabolism explains the allometric scaling of metabolic rates". Journal of The Royal Society Interface, 7(44), 507–514. doi:10.1098/rsif.2009.0310

Neurodegenerative disorders

- Demetrius, L., & Simon, D. K. (2013). "The inverse association of cancer and Alzheimer's: a bioenergetic mechanism". Journal of The Royal Society Interface, 10(82), 20130006. doi:10.1098/rsif.2013.0006
- Demetrius, L., Magistretti, P., & Pellerin, L. (2015). "Alzheimer's disease: the amyloid hypothesis and the Inverse Warburg effect". Frontiers in Physiology, 5, 522. doi:10.3389/fphys.2014.00522
- Demetrius, L., Eckert, A., & Grimm, A. (2021). "Sex differences in Alzheimer's disease: metabolic reprogramming and therapeutic intervention". Trends in Endocrinology & Metabolism, 32(12), 963–979. doi:10.1016/j.tem.2021.09.004

== See also ==
- Quantum Aspects of Life
- Caloric restriction
- Longevity
