= Milton A. Gordon =

American mathematician and university administrator (1935–2017)

- Born: May 25, 1935; Chicago, Illinois, U.S.
- Died: April 18, 2017 (aged 81)
- Education: Xavier University of Louisiana (BS); University of Detroit (MS); Illinois Institute of Technology (PhD)
- Occupations: Mathematician; Academic administrator
- Title: President of California State University, Fullerton
- Predecessor: Jewel Plummer Cobb
- Successor: Mildred García
- Spouse: Margaret Faulwell Gordon
- Children: 3

Milton Andrew Gordon (May 25, 1935 – April 18, 2017) was an American mathematician and academic administrator. He served as the fourth president of California State University, Fullerton from 1990 to 2012, making him the fourth African American president in the California State University system. During his presidency, Cal State Fullerton grew substantially in enrollment and campus facilities. Before joining Cal State Fullerton, Gordon held faculty and administrative positions at Chicago State University and Sonoma State University.

== Early life and education ==
Milton Andrew Gordon was born on May 25, 1935, in Chicago, Illinois. His father was from the segregated South in Louisiana but had moved to Chicago to make a better home for his family. He earned a bachelor's degree in mathematics and secondary education from Xavier University of Louisiana. Later he received a master's degree in mathematics from the University of Detroit and a doctorate in mathematics from the Illinois Institute of Technology.

== Career ==
Gordon began his career as an elementary school teacher in the Chicago Public Schools. Later he worked as a mathematics instructor at the Illinois Institute of Technology and served as director of the Afro-American Studies Program at Loyola University Chicago.

He was also professor of mathematics and dean of the College of Arts and Sciences at Chicago State University.

In 1986 he became vice president for academic affairs and professor of mathematics at Sonoma State University. He was appointed the fourth president of California State University, Fullerton, in August 1990, and served as president until 2012.

Gordon was the fourth African American president in the California State University system. He was also the first Black president at a predominately white university to succeed another Black president. He led CSUF during a period of enrollment growth from about 25,700 to more than 36,000 students. He oversaw the addition of 13 academic degree programs, including a doctorate in education. During his presidency, CSUF undertook more than $636 million in campus construction, including the expansion of the Pollak Library and the construction of the Mihaylo College of Business and Economics. He supported the opening of satellite campuses in Santa Ana and Garden Grove, as well as the establishment of a branch campus in Mission Viejo, later relocated to Irvine. He served as president during a period in which Cal State Fullerton became the leading California university in graduating Latino students.

Soon after Gordon became president, the California State University system faced a severe budget crisis involving planned layoffs and program closures. Subsequent state funding changes reduced the extent of the projected cuts. Nevertheless, the CSUF football program was discontinued in 1992 during the budget crisis.

During Gordon's presidency, CSUF was the subject of several state audits that identified weaknesses in financial management and internal controls. A 1999 investigation by the California State Auditor concluded that the university had engaged in serious financial mismanagement, citing the misuse of donated and scholarship funds for expenditures such as meals, entertainment, gifts, vehicle maintenance, and other non-educational purposes. The audit also found that university officials had bypassed competitive hiring and contracting procedures, improperly transferred funds to a university foundation, and failed to comply with restrictions governing charitable donations and scholarship accounts. Chancellor Charles B. Reed and Gordon acknowledged errors in judgment but disputed the characterization of the findings as serious mismanagement and instituted reviews of campus business practices. A subsequent state audit released in 2006 found that, between 2001 and 2004, the university continued to experience waste, poor record-keeping, inadequate oversight, conflicts of interest in contracting, and weaknesses in financial controls, while some employees reported fearing retaliation for reporting misconduct. Gordon stated that he had begun implementing reforms after learning of the problems in 2003, increased financial oversight, and that several employees left the university following the investigation.

During his tenure at CSUF, Gordon held leadership positions with several professional organizations including the Hispanic Association of Colleges and Universities and the American Council on Education. Iin 2019, CSUF's University Hall was renamed Milton A. Gordon Hall to recognize his accomplishments.

== Honors and awards ==
- 2011 – Professional Achievement Award, (Illinois Institute of Technology)
- 2010 – President's Award of Excellence, (Hispanic Association of Colleges and Universities)
- 2010 – Alfredo G. de los Santos Jr. Distinguished Leadership in Higher Education Award, (American Association of Hispanics in Higher Education )
- 2010 – Man of the Year Award, presented jointly by Christ Our Redeemer AME Church, the Black Chamber of Orange County, 100 Black Men of Orange County, and the Orange County Ministerial Alliance.

== Personal life and death ==
Gordon married Margaret Faulwell in 1987. He had three sons. He died on April 18, 2017, at the age of 81.
