= Dolores Richard Spikes =

American mathematician

- Born: Dolores Margaret Richard; August 24, 1936; Baton Rouge, Louisiana, United States
- Died: June 1, 2015 (aged 78); Baton Rouge, Louisiana, United States
- Education: Louisiana State University; University of Illinois at Urbana–Champaign
- Spouse: Hermon Spikes (m. 1958)
- Awards: Thurgood Marshall Educational Achievement Award
- Scientific career
- Fields: Commutative rings
- Workplaces: University of Maryland Eastern Shore; Southern University Baton Rouge
- Doctoral advisor: Jack Ohm

Dolores Margaret Richard Spikes (August 24, 1936 – June 1, 2015) was an American mathematician and university administrator.

== Biography ==
Born in Baton Rouge, Dolores Richard attended public and parochial schools in that city and, still in her home city, went on to Southern University from which she earned her B.S. degree in mathematics in 1957. Also at Southern she met her future husband, Hermon Spikes.

Spikes continued her education at the University of Illinois in Champaign-Urbana where she earned a master of science degree in mathematics and then returned in 1958 to Louisiana where she married Spikes and began teaching high school science in Mossville, a small, mostly black community near Lake Charles.

In December, 1971 (with a dissertation titled "Semi-Valuations and Groups of Divisibility") Dolores Spikes earned a Ph.D. in mathematics from Louisiana State University. Spikes was the first African-American woman to earn a Ph.D. in mathematics from Louisiana State; that website also offers a number of anecdotes that help to portray Spikes as a human being as well as an academic.

In the 1980s at Southern University Spikes moved into various administrative positions—starting in 1982 as Assistant to the Chancellor and, in the late eighties, she served as Chancellor for both the Baton Rouge and New Orleans Campuses of Southern University—in fact, she was the first female chancellor of a Louisiana Land Grant University. In 1987 she was appointed to the board of Harvard University's Institute of Educational Management. In 1988 Dr. Spikes accepted the position of president of the Southern University and A&M College System.-- she not only was the first woman to lead a public college or university in Louisiana, she also was the first woman in the US to serve as chief administrator for a university system. Later, Spikes became the 11th president of the University of Maryland Eastern Shore—and its first female president—from 1996–2001.

She died in 2015 and was funeralized at Sacred Heart Catholic Church in Baton Rouge.
