= Joseph Dennis (mathematician) =

American mathematician (1905–1977)

Joseph James Dennis (11 April 1905 in Gainesville, Florida – April 1977) was an African-American mathematician. He served as the chairman of the Clark College mathematics department from 1930 to 1974.

Dennis gained his B.A. from Clark College in 1929, and his M.A. from Northwestern University in 1935. He earned his Ph.D. at Northwestern University in 1944. This is the same year as two other African-American men earned a Ph.D in mathematics, Wade Ellis Sr. and Warren Hill Brothers (both from the University of North Western University). His thesis was "Some Points in the Theory of Positive Definite J-Fractions" (related to continued fractions), supervised by H. S. Wall. He was one of the first African Americans to earn a PhD.

A building, and a scholarship fund for junior and senior mathematics majors at Clark University, are named in J.J. Dennis' honor.
