= Clarence F. Stephens =

African-American mathematician

Clarence Francis Stephens
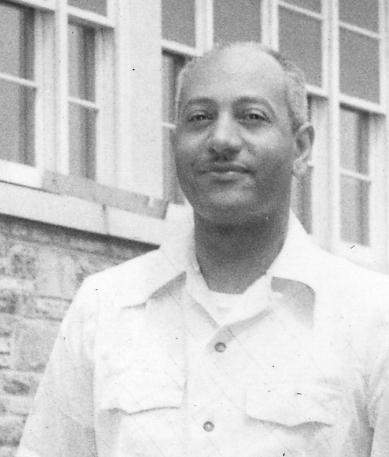
- Stephens at Morgan State University in the 1960s
- Born: July 24, 1917
- Died: March 5, 2018 (aged 100)
- Education: Johnson C. Smith University (BS); University of Michigan (PhD)
- Known for: Morgan-Potsdam Model for teaching mathematics
- Scientific career
- Workplaces: Prairie View A&M University; Morgan State University; SUNY Geneseo; SUNY Potsdam
- Thesis: Nonlinear Difference Equations Analytic in a Parameter (1944)

Clarence Francis Stephens (July 24, 1917 – March 5, 2018) was an American mathematician. He is credited with inspiring students and faculty at SUNY Potsdam to form the most successful United States undergraduate mathematics degree programs in the past century. Stephens was recognized by Mathematically Gifted & Black as a Black History Month 2018 Honoree.

== Early life ==
The fifth of six children, he was orphaned at the age of eight. For his early education, he attended Harbison Agricultural and Industrial Institute, a boarding school for African-Americans in Irmo, South Carolina under Dean R. W. Bouleware and later President Rev John G. Porter.

Stephens graduated from Johnson C. Smith University in 1938 with a B.S. degree in mathematics. He received his M.S. (1939) and his Ph.D. (1944) from the University of Michigan. He was the 9th African American to receive a Ph.D in mathematics––for a thesis on Non-Linear Difference Equations Analytic in a Parameter under James Nyswander.

After serving in the U.S. Navy (1942–1946) as a Teaching Specialist, Dr. Stephens joined the mathematics faculty of Prairie View A&M University. The next year (1947) he was invited to join the mathematics faculty at Morgan State University.

== From research to teaching ==
As a Mathematics Association of America (MAA) biography explains, “Dr. Stephens' focus was on being a research mathematician, so he accepted the position in part because he would be near a research library at Johns Hopkins University. While at Morgan State University, Dr. Stephens became appalled at what a poor job was being done in general to teach and inspire students to learn mathematics. He changed his focus from being a researcher to achieving excellence, with desirable results, in teaching mathematics.

In 1953, he received a one-year Ford Fellowship to study at the Institute for Advanced Study in Princeton, New Jersey.

Dr. Stephens remained at Morgan State until 1962, where is credited with initiating the program which led to five students achieving 91% to 99% on the graduate record exam in mathematics, three of these students (Earl R. Barnes, Arthur D. Grainger and Scott W. Williams) became the only three students of the same class at a Historically Black College to earn a PhD in mathematics. Stephens accepted an appointment as professor of mathematics at SUNY Geneseo. In 1969 he left Geneseo to join the mathematics faculty at SUNY Potsdam, where he served as chair of the mathematics department until his retirement in 1987.

The MAA biography reports that during Dr. Stephens’ tenure at SUNY Potsdam "the department became nationally known as a model of teaching excellence in mathematics. For several of these years the program was among the top producers of mathematics majors in the country. The teaching techniques that Professor Stephens introduced at Potsdam, and earlier at Morgan State, have been adopted by many mathematics departments across the country. They have been described in publications by the MAA, and recently in a book, Math Education At Its Best: The Potsdam Model, by Datta (Center for Teaching/Learning of Mathematics, 1993)." He turned 100 in July 2017 and died in March 2018.

== Teaching method ==
Stephens pioneered "Morgan-Potsdam Model" of teaching mathematics. The model was founded on the idea that the study of pure mathematics can be learned by a large number of students if they are provided with a supportive and caring environment. The environment was meant to consist of considerate and well trained teachers, continuous encouragement, successful role models, enough success to build self-esteem and the belief that education is a worth while effort. This made Stephens' teaching method one of the most effective in producing mathematics majors.

== Honours, decorations, awards and distinctions ==
- 1942 He received a Julius Rosenwald Fellowship reward
- 1943 He received a Ford Fellowship for contributing research as a member of the Institute for Advanced Study in Princeton, New Jersey
- 1962 Honored by Governor J. Millard Tawes of Maryland for contributions to education
- 1976-77 he received the 1976-77 SUNY Chancellor's Award for Excellence in Teaching
- 1987 honored by Governor Mario Cuomo of New York for contributions to education

== Sources ==
- Clarence Francis Stephens (Google cache)
- Clarence Stephens
- The Morgan-Potsdam Model and the Potsdam Miracle
