= Elgy Johnson =

American mathematician (1912–1987)

Elgy S. Johnson
- Born: Jacksonville, Florida, US
- Died: 1987; Washington D. C.
- Occupation: mathematician

Elgy Sibley Johnson (November 8, 1912 – March 12, 1987) was a mathematician and professor at University of the District of Columbia from the school's foundation in 1976 until his retirement in 1983. Johnson had formerly been the acting president of Federal City College from 1972 through 1974 where he chaired the mathematics department.

Johnson graduated from Johnson C. Smith University in Charlotte, N.C. He received his master's degree in mathematical statistics at the University of Michigan and a law degree from Catholic University. His doctorate in mathematics at Catholic University was titled Properties of solutions of nonlinear differential equations. He was the 25th African American to earn a PhD. in mathematics. He was a member of the Mu Lambda chapter of the Alpha Phi Alpha fraternity.

== Personal life ==
Johnson was married to Lola Craft and later divorced. He married Bernice Johnson in 1984.
