= Georgia Caldwell Smith =

One of the first African-American women to gain a bachelor's degree in mathematics

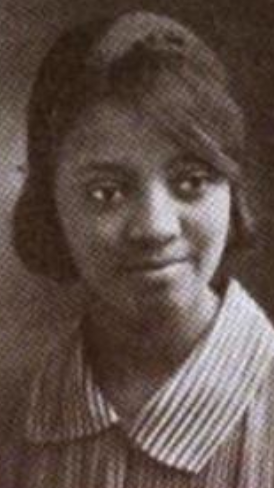
- Georgia Caldwell, later Smith, from a 1928 publication
- Born: September 28, 1909; Atchison, Kansas, US
- Died: 6 May 1961 (aged 51)
- Education: University of Kansas; University of Chicago; University of Pittsburgh
- Known for: One of the first African-American woman awarded a Ph.D. in mathematics; Head of Spelman's Department of Mathematics
- Awards: Posthumous Ph.D.
- Scientific career
- Fields: Mathematics
- Workplaces: Spelman College; Lincoln University (Missouri); Alabama State College

Georgia Caldwell Smith (1909–1961) was one of the first African-American women to gain a bachelor's degree in mathematics. When she was 51, she earned a Ph.D. in mathematics, one of the earliest by an African-American woman, awarded posthumously in 1961. Smith was the head of the Department of Mathematics at Spelman College.

== Early life and education ==
Smith was born in Atchison, Kansas on 28 August 1909, and attended segregated public schools. She gained her A.B. in 1928, and A.M. in 1929, both in mathematics from the University of Kansas. She gained a master's in mathematics from the University of Chicago in 1929. She was a member of Alpha Kappa Alpha sorority.

== Career ==
Smith was an assistant professor of mathematics of the faculty of Spelman College from 1929 to 1938, and then at Lincoln University (Missouri) until 1943 and Alabama State College. She returned to Spelman in 1945 to take on the position of head of the Department of Mathematics.

Smith undertook further study at the University of Minnesota and University of Georgia, gaining a National Science Foundation fellowship to work on her doctorate. Smith completed her dissertation in 1960 at the University of Pittsburgh, titled Some results on the anti center of a group. Her supervisor was Norman Levine. Her thesis, in Group theory, was approved in January 1961; however, she died of cancer in May. She as awarded the Ph.D. posthumously in 1961.

Professional memberships included the Mathematical Association of America and the American Mathematical Society, including participation in its 1948 meeting in New York. Smith was elected to Phi Beta Kappa and Pi Mu Epsilon.

== Personal life and death ==
Smith was married to Dr. Barnett Frissell Smith, the head of Spelman's department of biology. They had a son, Barnett F. Smith Jr. She died on 6 May 1961, due to cancer before her PhD was conferred posthumously in June.
