= Black Mathematicians and Their Works =

Edited volume of works by black mathematicians

- Editor: Virginia Newell; Joella Gipson; L.Waldo Rich; Beauregard Stubblefield
- Publisher: Dorrance & Company
- Publication date: 1980
- ISBN: 9780805926774

Black Mathematicians and Their Works is an edited volume of works in and about mathematics, by African-American mathematicians. It was edited by Virginia Newell, Joella Gipson, L. Waldo Rich, and Beauregard Stubblefield, with a foreword by Wade Ellis, and published in 1980 by Dorrance & Company. The Basic Library List Committee of the Mathematical Association of America has recommended its inclusion in undergraduate mathematics libraries.

== Contents ==
The book celebrates the achievements of black mathematicians and also records their struggle against racism. It includes reprints of 23 papers of mathematics research and three more on mathematics education, by black mathematicians. It provides brief biographies and photographs of 62 black mathematicians, all long-established at the time of publication (having doctorates prior to 1973). It also reproduces several letters by Lee Lorch documenting racist behavior in mathematical societies, such as exclusion from conferences and their associated social gatherings. An appendix lists universities that have worked with black mathematicians, by the number of doctorates conferred and the number of faculty hired.

As well as two of the editors (Gipson and Stubblefield), the authors whose works are reproduced in the book include Albert Turner Bharucha-Reid, David Blackwell, Lillian K. Bradley, Marjorie Lee Browne, Edward M. Carroll, William Schieffelin Claytor, Vivienne Malone-Mayes, Clarence F. Stephens, Walter Richard Talbot, and J. Ernest Wilkins Jr.

== Reception ==
Black Mathematicians and Their Works was the first book to collect the works of black mathematicians, and 40 years after its publication it remained the only such book. By demonstrating the successes of black mathematicians, it aimed to counter the then-current opinion that black people could not do mathematics, and provide encouragement to young black future mathematicians.

Edray Herber Goins has named this book as his "mathematical comfort food", writing:

Whenever I question whether black folk are making progress in these United States, I think of the articles in this volume, and those pioneers who continued to do math in the face of blatant racism.
