= Ernest Wilkins =

Ernest Wilkins may refer to:

- J. Ernest Wilkins Sr. (1894–1959), African American lawyer, labor leader and undersecretary in the Eisenhower administration
- J. Ernest Wilkins Jr. (1923–2011), mathematician and nuclear scientist
