= Edray Herber Goins =

American mathematician

Edray H. Goins
- Born: June 29, 1972 (age 54); Los Angeles
- Education: California Institute of Technology; Stanford University
- Scientific career
- Fields: Mathematics
- Workplaces: Pomona College; Purdue University
- Thesis: Elliptic curves and icosahedral Galois representations (1999)
- Doctoral advisors: Daniel Bump; Karl Rubin
- Doctoral students: Alexander J. Barrios, Tyler Billingsley, Jacob Bond, Kevin Mugo, and James Weigandt
- Website: www.pomona.edu/directory/people/edray-goins

Edray Herber Goins (born June 29, 1972, Los Angeles) is an American mathematician. He specializes in number theory and algebraic geometry. His interests include Selmer groups for elliptic curves using class groups of number fields, Belyi maps and dessins d'enfant.

== Early life ==
Goins was born in Los Angeles in 1972. His mother, Eddi Beatrice Brown, was a teacher. He attended public schools in South Los Angeles and got his BSc in mathematics and physics in 1994 from California Institute of Technology, where he also received two prizes for mathematics. He completed his PhD in 1999 on “Elliptic Curves and Icosahedral Galois Representations” from Stanford University, under Daniel Bump and Karl Rubin.

== Career ==
He served for many years on the faculty of Purdue University. He has also served as visiting scholar at both the Institute for Advanced Study in Princeton, and Harvard. Goins took a position at Pomona College in 2018.

His summers have focused on engaging underrepresented students in research in the mathematical sciences. He currently runs the NSF-funded Research Experience for Undergraduates (REU) "Pomona Research in Mathematics Experience (PRiME)", a program that Goins started in 2016 at Purdue University under the title "Purdue Research in Mathematics Experience (PRiME)". He is noted for his 2018 essay, "Three Questions: The Journey of One Black Mathematician".

From 2015 to 2020, Goins served as president of the National Association of Mathematicians (NAM).

== Mathematicians of the African Diaspora ==
In 1997 Scott W. Williams of the University at Buffalo, SUNY created the website Mathematicians of the African Diaspora (MAD) dedicated to promoting and highlighting the contributions of members of the African diaspora to mathematics, especially contributions to current mathematical research. Williams retired in 2008 and it was left to others to continue the website he had spent 11 years building. After an initial town hall meeting about the future of the MAD Pages which took place at a Conference for African American Researchers in the Mathematical Sciences (CAARMS), an informal group of mathematicians decided to work together to preserve Williams’ work. In 2015, the National Association of Mathematicians (NAM) formed an ad hoc committee to update the MAD Pages, consisting of Edray Goins as NAM President, Committee Co-Chairs Don King (Northeastern University) and Asamoah Nkwanta (Morgan State University), and web developer John Weaver (Varsity Software).

== Recognition ==
Goins was elected to the 2019 Class of Fellows of the Association for Women in Mathematics. He was named as a Fellow of the American Mathematical Society, in its 2027 class of fellows.

== Selected papers ==
- 2000 A ternary algebra with applications to binary quadratic forms Council for African American Researchers in the Mathematical Sciences, Vol. IV (Baltimore, MD, 2000), 7--12, Contemp. Math., 284, Amer. Math. Soc., Providence, RI, 2001.
- 2001 Artin's conjecture and elliptic curves Contemp. Math., 275, 39–51, Amer. Math. Soc., Providence, RI, 2001.
- 2001 The fractional parts of N/K (with M. R. Currie) Council for African American Researchers in the Mathematical Sciences, Vol. III (Baltimore, MD, 1997/Ann Arbor, MI, 1999), 13–31, Contemp. Math., 275, Amer. Math. Soc., Providence, RI, 2001.
- 2003 Icosahedral Q-Curve Extensions , Math. Res. Lett. 10 (2003), no. 2-3.
- 2007 On Pythagorean quadruplets (with Alain Togbe) International Journal of Pure and Applied Mathematics, Vol 35, No 3, 2007, pp 365–374
- 2008 On the Diophantine Equation $x^2 + 2^\alpha5^\alpha13^\alpha = y^n$ (with Florian Luca & Alain Togbé) Algorithmic number theory, pp 430–442, Lecture Notes in Comput. Sci., 5011, Springer, Berlin.
- 2009 Palindromes in different bases: A conjecture of J. Ernest Wilkins. Integers 9 (2009), A55, 725–734.
- 2010 Semi-magic squares and elliptic curves. Missouri J. Math. Sci. 22 (2010), no. 2, 102–107.
- 2012 Points on hyperbolas at rational distance (with Kevin Mugo). Int. J. Number Theory 8 (2012), no. 4, 911–922.
- 2013 Branch decomposition heuristics for linear matroids (with Jing Ma, Susan Margulies and Illya V.Hicks). Discrete Optim. 10 no. 2, 102–119. (2013)
- 2013 Arithmetic progressions on conic sections (with Alejandra Alvarado). Int. J. Number Theory 9, no. 6, 1379–1393. (2013)
- 2014 On the generalized climbing stairs problem (with Talitha M. Washington) Ars Combin. 117 (2014)
- 2016 Riordan matrix representations of Euler's constant γ and Euler's number e (with Asamoah Nkwanta) International Journal of Combinatorics, 2016
