= Virginia Newell =

American educator, author and politician (1917–2025)

- Newell in 2024

Alderman of Winston-Salem, North Carolina (East Ward)
- In office 1977–1993

Personal details
- Born: Virginia Kimbrough; October 7, 1917 Advance, North Carolina, US
- Died: March 14, 2025 (aged 107)
- Spouse: George Newell (m. 1943; died 1989)
- Children: 2
- Education: Talladega College; New York University; University of Sarasota
- Occupation: Educator; author; politician
- Awards: Order of the Long Leaf Pine

Virginia Kimbrough Newell (née Kimbrough; October 7, 1917 – March 14, 2025) was an American politician, mathematics educator and author. She was known for being a mathematics professor and the founder of the computer science program at Winston-Salem State University and retired from the university as a professor emeritus. Along with Vivian Burke, she was the first African American woman to become alderman of Winston-Salem, North Carolina. She was awarded the Order of the Long Leaf Pine in 2017 for her work.

== Early life and education ==
Virginia Kimbrough was born on October 7, 1917, in Advance, North Carolina, one of nine children. Although her family was African American, she grew up playing with the white children in a white neighborhood. Her father, a builder, also had the right to vote despite it being the Jim Crow era because he had a white ancestor. Both of her parents had studied at Shaw University without finishing a degree. Kimbrough learned arithmetic helping her father in his measurements, and won a mathematics competition in elementary school.

Her family sent her away to live with a great aunt, so that she could obtain a better education at North Carolina's Atkins High School. There, she learned mathematics from teachers Togo West and Beatrice Armstead, earning straight A's and becoming a teacher's assistant. After graduating in 1936, she obtained scholarships from many colleges, and chose to major in mathematics at Talladega College, a historically black college in Alabama. Many of her teachers there had previously taught at Ivy League universities, and had come to Talladega to teach because of mandatory retirement at their former employers.

She later earned a master's degree from New York University, and took courses from the University of Wisconsin, Atlanta University, University of Chicago, and North Carolina State College. She completed a doctorate in education at the University of Sarasota in 1976, with the dissertation Development of mathematics self-instructional learning packages with activities from the newspaper for prospective elementary school teachers enrolled at Winston-Salem State University.

== Career ==
Kimbrough post-college returned to Atkins High School as a mathematics teacher. There, in 1943, she married George Newell, who had been her biology teacher at the same school, changing her name to Virginia Newell. They had two daughters together: Glenda and Virginia, who are both physicians. Newell and her husband both taught at several institutions in Atlanta and Raleigh, North Carolina, including Washington Graded and High School, John W. Ligon High School, and Shaw University, where Virginia Newell was an associate professor of mathematics from 1960 to 1965. George Newell died in 1989.

In 1965, they both settled at Winston-Salem State University, where Virginia Newell became a mathematics professor. At Winston-Salem State University, she chaired the mathematics department, helped bring computers to the university and founded the computer science program, becoming founding chair of the computer science department in 1979. She spearheaded several initiatives for middle school students, including the Math and Science Academy of Excellence, the New Directions for our Youth program aimed at preventing dropouts, and the Best Choice Center for after-school education. She was a co-founder and president of the North Carolina Council of Teachers on Mathematics.

In 1980, Newell became one of the coauthors of Black Mathematicians and Their Works (with Joella Gipson, L. Waldo Rich, and Beauregard Stubblefield, Dorrance & Company), the first book to highlight the contributions of African American mathematicians. She was also editor of the newsletter of the National Association of Mathematicians, an organization for African American mathematicians, from 1974 into the 1980s.

She retired after 20 years of service at Winston-Salem State, c. 1985, as professor emerita.

== Politics and later life ==
Newell first became politically active during the civil rights movement in the 1960s, spreading awareness both on the Shaw University campus where she was teaching at as well as in the greater community. She also participated in numerous protest marches held in support of the movement.

As part of the 1972 US presidential campaign, Newell was co-chair of the Shirley Chisholm campaign in North Carolina. In 1977, Newell was elected (with Vivian Burke) as one of the first two African American women to become aldermen of Winston-Salem, North Carolina; she represented its East Ward. She served in that position for 16 years.

Newell was later involved with organizing local ward outreach in the East Ward for Barack Obama during his presidential campaigns. She also voted for Kamala Harris in the 2024 United States presidential election and directly connected with Harris herself both over Zoom and through maintaining a written correspondence, although was unable to volunteer to the same extent as before due to her advanced age.

Newell died on March 14, 2025, at the age of 107.

== Recognition ==
The computer science center at Winston-Salem State University is named for Newell, as is one of the streets in Winston-Salem, Virginia Newell Lane.

In 2017, Newell was given the Order of the Long Leaf Pine, the highest honor of the governor of North Carolina. In 2018, the National Association of Mathematicians gave her their Centenarian Award. In 2019, Newell was given the YWCA Women of Vision Lifetime Achievement Award. She was listed in 2021 as a Black History Month Honoree by the Mathematically Gifted and Black website.
