= David B. Wilkins =

American lawyer

David Wilkins
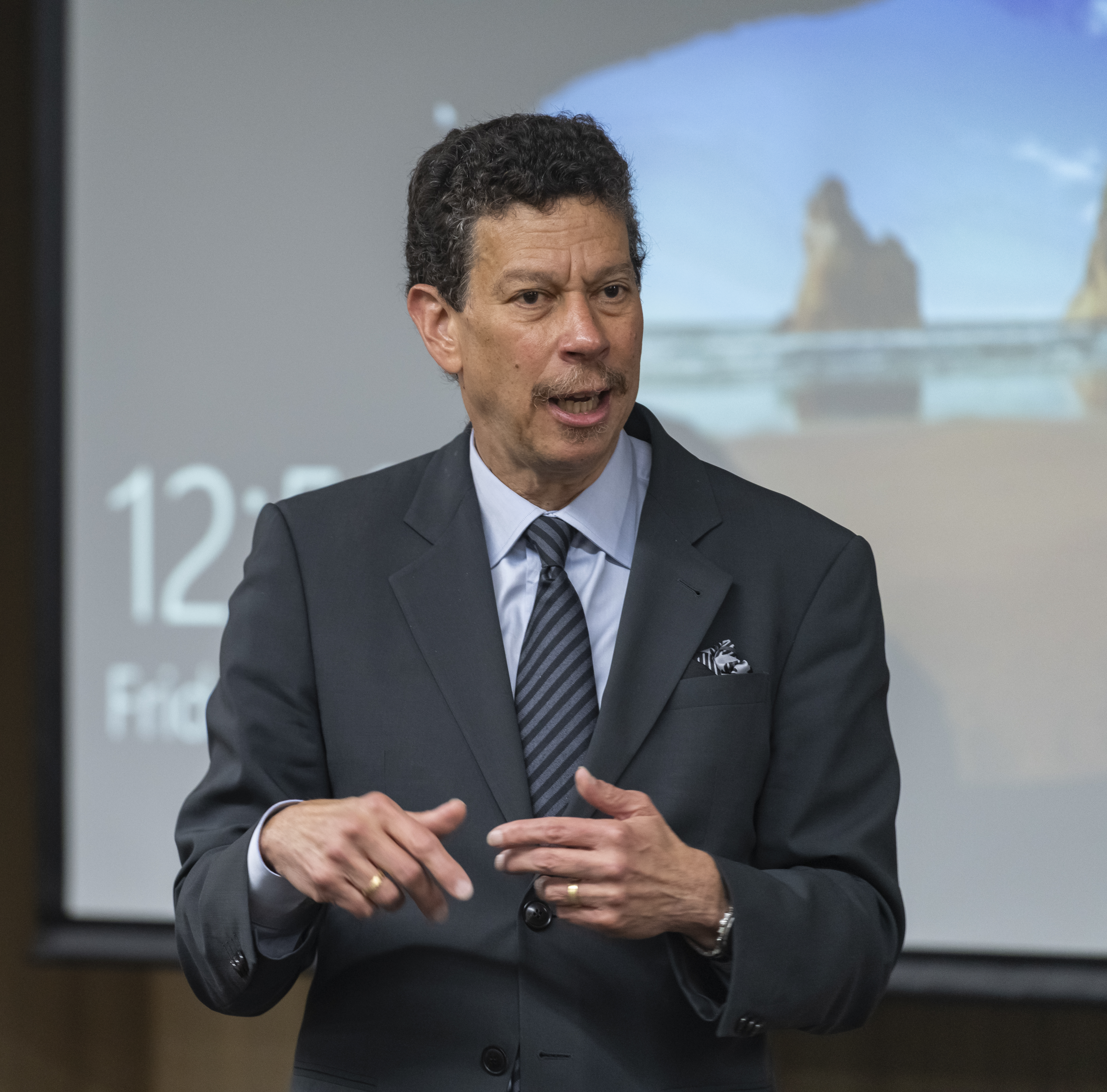
- Born: January 22, 1956 (age 70); Chicago, Illinois, U.S.
- Education: Harvard University (BA, JD)
- Relatives: Timothy A. Wilkins (brother); J. Ernest Wilkins Jr. (uncle); J. Ernest Wilkins Sr. (grandfather)

David B. Wilkins (born January 22, 1956) is an American legal scholar who is the Lester Kissel Professor of Law and faculty director of the Center on the Legal Profession at Harvard Law School. He is a senior research fellow of the American Bar Foundation, the Harvard Law School's vice dean for global initiatives on the legal profession, and a faculty associate of the Harvard University Edmond J. Safra Foundation Center for Ethics.

== Early life and education ==
Wilkins is a Chicago native, and a graduate of the University of Chicago Laboratory Schools. His father, Julian Wilkins, headed the law firm of Wilkins, Wilkins & Wilkins, and became the first black partner at a major Chicago law firm in 1971.

Wilkins graduated with honors from Harvard College in 1977 with a Bachelor of Arts in government. He earned a Juris Doctor degree in 1980 from Harvard Law School. While at Harvard Law, he served as the Supreme Court editor of the Harvard Law Review and was also a member of the Harvard Civil Rights-Civil Liberties Law Review and the Harvard Black Law Student Association.

== Career ==
After graduating law school, he clerked for Judge Wilfred Feinberg, a United States Circuit Judge of the U.S. Court of Appeals for the Second Circuit. He then clerked for Justice Thurgood Marshall at the United States Supreme Court between 1981 and 1982.

After clerking, in 1982, Wilkins became an associate with a specialization in civil litigation at the law firm of Nussbaum Owen & Webster in Washington, D.C. Wilkins is a member of the Bar in the District of Columbia and the United States District Court for the District of Columbia.

In 1986, Wilkins joined the faculty at Harvard Law School, earning tenure six years later, and he has recently been mentioned as a potential candidate to become dean of Harvard Law. His research focuses primarily on the legal profession, and he is the co-author (along with his Harvard Law School colleague Andrew Kaufman) of one of the leading casebooks in the field.

In 2005, graduating seniors voted him the top teacher in Harvard Law's Center for Ethics.

== Personal life ==
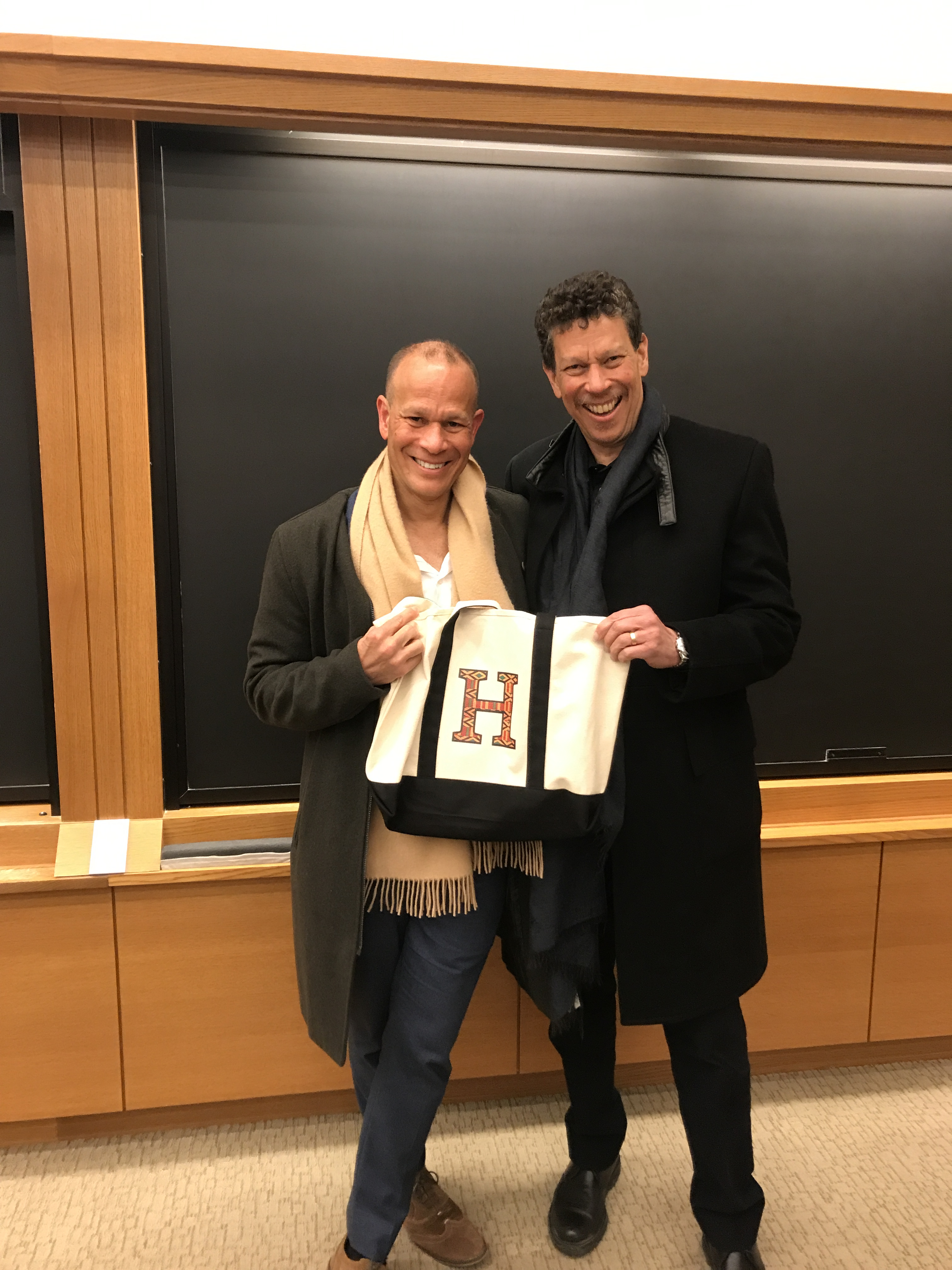
Timothy A. Wilkins and David B. Wilkins

Wilkins and his wife, Anne Marie, live in Cambridge, Massachusetts, with their son. Anne Marie Wilkins is an entertainment executive who has managed the career of entertainer Harry Connick Jr. since he was 18 years old. She is also Director and Senior Advisor at Marsalis Music, a company she co-founded with Branford Marsalis in 2001. She is a member of the Board of Trustees of the Berklee College of Music and holds a Juris Doctor degree from Harvard Law School. In 2015 President Barack Obama appointed Anne Marie Wilkins as a General Trustee of the John F. Kennedy Center for the Performing Arts.

David Wilkins instructed former First Lady Michelle Obama and is friends with former U.S. president Barack Obama. His father, Julian Wilkins, was the first Black partner at a major law firm in Chicago. He is the grandson of J. Ernest Wilkins Sr. and the nephew of J Ernest Wilkins Jr. His brother, Timothy A. Wilkins, is a partner with Freshfields Bruckhaus Deringer.

== Awards and distinctions ==
- 2020 Albert M. Sacks-Paul A. Freund Award for Teaching Excellence
- 2016 Harvard Law School Association Award
- 2012 Honorary Doctorate in Law from Stockholm University in Stockholm, Sweden
- 2012 Distinguished Visiting Mentor from Australia National University in Canberra, Australia
- Distinguished Fellow at O.P. Jindal Global University
- 2012 Genest Fellowship from Osgoode Hall Law School in Toronto, Ontario
- 2012 Member of the American Academy of Arts and Sciences.
- 2010 American Bar Foundation Scholar of the Year
- 2009 J. Clay Smith Award from Howard University School of Law
- 2008 Order of the Coif Distinguished Scholar Fellowship
- 2009 Commencement Speaker at the University of Iowa College of Law.
- 1998 Albert Sacks-Paul Freund Award for Teaching Excellence.

== See also ==
- List of law clerks for the tenth seat of the Supreme Court of the United States
