= J. Ernest Wilkins Jr. =

American mathematician (1923–2011)

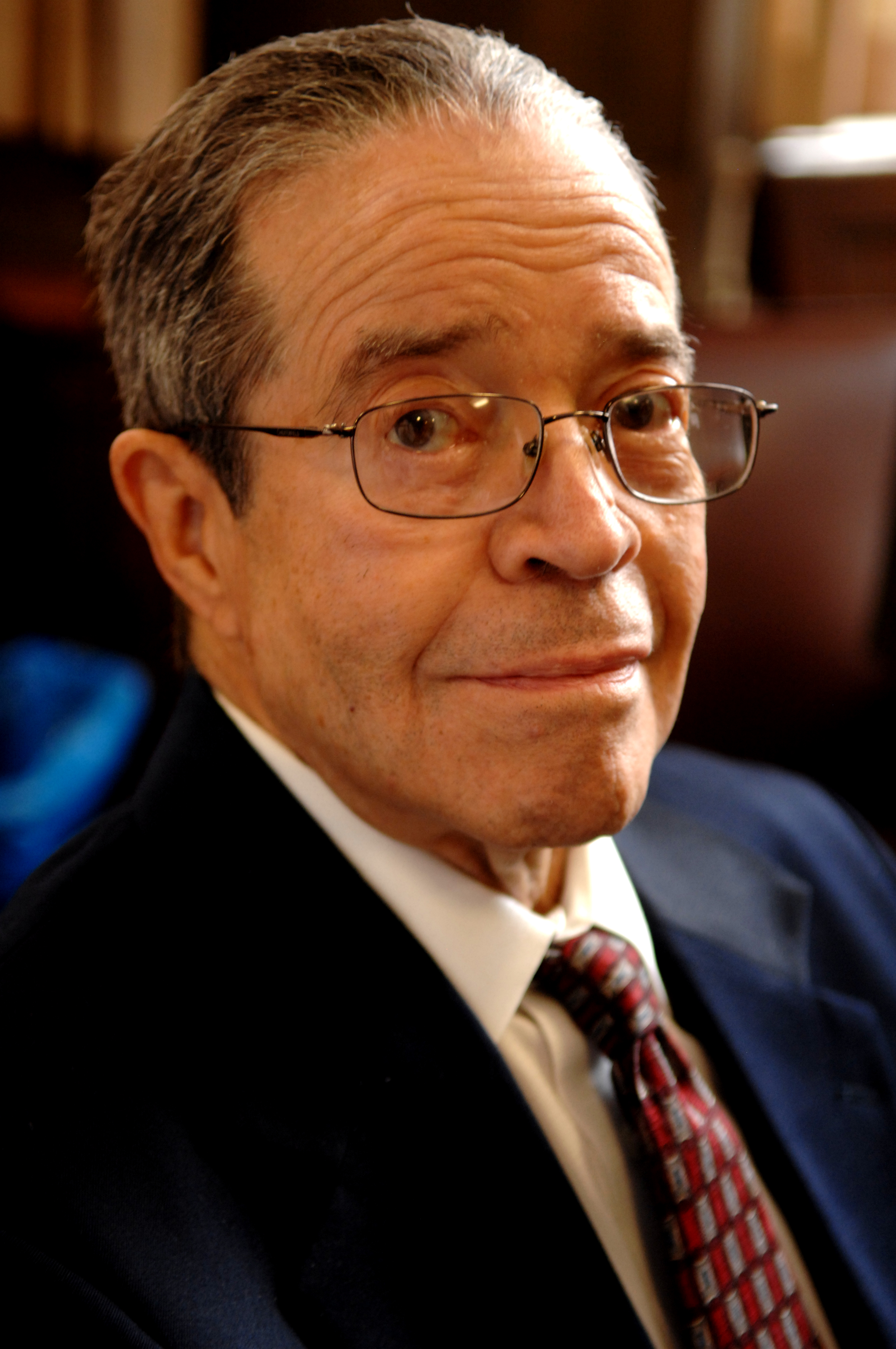
- Wilkins in 2007
- Born: November 27, 1923; Chicago, Illinois, U.S.
- Died: May 1, 2011 (aged 87); Fountain Hills, Arizona, U.S.
- Education: University of Chicago (BA, MS, PhD)
- Known for: Work on nuclear physics and engineering
- Scientific career
- Fields: Mathematics and physics
- Workplaces: Metallurgical Laboratory; Argonne National Laboratory
- Thesis: Multiple Integral Problems in Parametric Form in the Calculus of Variations (1942)
- Doctoral advisor: Magnus Hestenes

Jesse Ernest Wilkins Jr. (November 27, 1923 – May 1, 2011) was an American nuclear scientist, mechanical engineer and mathematician. A child prodigy, he attended the University of Chicago at the age of 13, becoming its youngest ever student. His graduation at a young age resulted in him being hailed as "the Negro Genius" in the national media.

Wilkins and Eugene Wigner co-developed the Wigner-Wilkins approach for estimating the distribution of neutron energies within nuclear reactors, which is the basis for how all nuclear reactors are designed. Wilkins later went on to become the President of the American Nuclear Society in 1974.

Wilkins had a widely varied career, spanning seven decades and including significant contributions to pure and applied mathematics, civil and nuclear engineering, and optics. Wilkins was one of the African American scientists and technicians on the Manhattan Project during the Second World War. He also conducted nuclear physics research in both academia and industry. He wrote numerous scientific papers, served in various important posts, earned several significant awards and helped recruit minority students into the sciences. During his life he was often the target of racism.

== Education and early career ==
In 1940, Wilkins completed his AB in mathematics at the University of Chicago. He went on to an MS and PhD in mathematics at the same institution, which he completed in 1941 and 1942. His thesis was titled Multiple Integral Problems in Parametric Form in the Calculus of Variations, and was advised by Magnus Hestenes.

Having initially been unable to secure a research position, Wilkins taught mathematics from 1943 to 1944 at the Tuskegee Institute (now Tuskegee University) in Tuskegee, Alabama.

== Manhattan Project ==
In 1944 Wilkins returned to the University of Chicago where he served first as an associate mathematical physicist and then as a physicist in its Metallurgical Laboratory, as part of the Manhattan Project. Working under the direction of Arthur Holly Compton and Enrico Fermi, Wilkins researched the extraction of fissionable nuclear materials, but was not told of the research group's ultimate goal until after the atomic bomb was dropped on Hiroshima. Wilkins was the co-discoverer or discoverer of a number of phenomena in physics such as the Wilkins effect and the Wigner–Wilkins spectra.

When Wilkins's team was about to be transferred to the Oak Ridge National Laboratory in Oak Ridge, Tennessee (known at the time as site "X"), due to the Jim Crow laws of the Southern United States, Wilkins would have been prevented from working there. When Edward Teller was informed about this, he wrote a letter on September 18, 1944, to Harold Urey (who was the director of war research at Columbia at the time) of Wilkins's abilities, informing him about the issue caused by local reactions to Wilkins's race, and recommending his services for a new position. As Teller explained:

Knowing that men of high qualifications are scarce these days, I thought that it might be useful that I suggest a capable person for this job. Mr. Wilkins in Wigner's group at the Metallurgical Laboratory has been doing, according to Wigner, excellent work. He is a colored man and since Wigner's group is moving to "X" it is not possible for him to continue work with that group. I think that it might be a good idea to secure his services for our work.

Wilkins then continued to teach mathematics and conduct significant research in neutron absorption with physicist Eugene Wigner, including the development of its mathematical models. He would also later help design and develop nuclear reactors for electrical power generation, becoming part owner of one such company.

== Later career ==
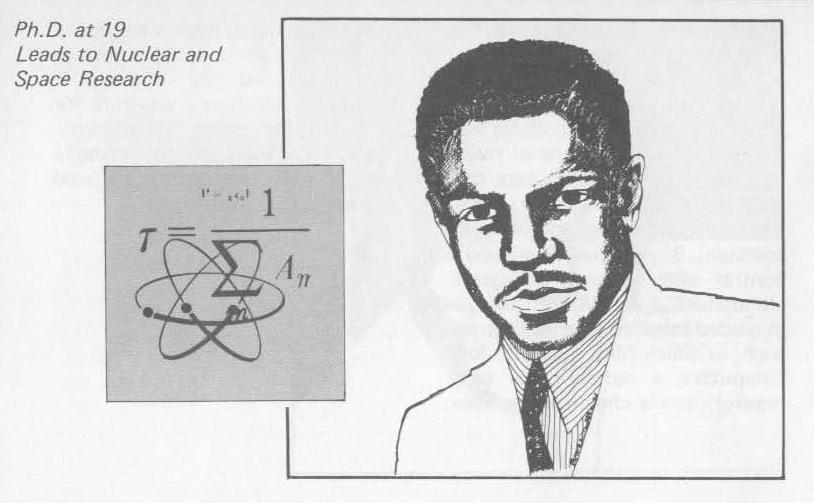
Sketch of Wilkins from a U.S. Department of Energy biography

To improve communication between mathematicians and nuclear engineers on a project, Wilkins earned bachelor's (1957) and master's degrees (1960) in mechanical engineering from New York University, thus earning five science degrees during his life. It also qualified him to design and build nuclear facilities.

In 1970 Wilkins went on to serve Howard University as its distinguished professor of applied mathematical physics and also to help found the university's PhD program in mathematics. During his tenure at Howard he undertook a sabbatical position as a visiting scientist at Argonne National Laboratory from 1976 to 1977.

From 1974 to 1975 Wilkins served as president of the American Nuclear Society and in 1976 became the second African American to be elected to the National Academy of Engineering.

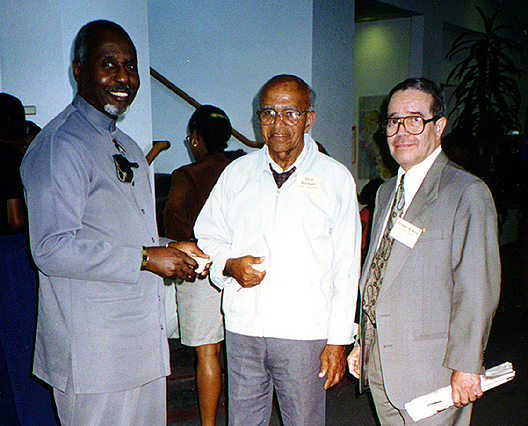
J. Ernest Wilkins Jr. (right) at the Conference for African American Researchers in the Mathematical Sciences (CAARMS), Mathematical Sciences Research Institute (MSRI), Berkeley, California in June 1995. Next to him are, from left to right: Abdulalim Shabazz and David Blackwell.

From 1990 Wilkins lived and worked in Atlanta, Georgia, as a distinguished professor of applied mathematics and mathematical physics at Clark Atlanta University, and retired again for his last time in 2003.

Throughout his years of research Wilkins published more than 100 papers on a variety of subjects, including differential geometry, linear differential equations, integrals, nuclear engineering, gamma radiation shielding and optics, garnering numerous professional and scientific awards along the way.

== Family ==
Wilkins had two children with his first wife Gloria Louise Steward (d. 1980) whom he married in June 1947, married Maxine G. Malone in 1984. He was married a third time to Vera Wood Anderson in Chicago in September 2003. He had a daughter, Sharon, and a son, J. Ernest III, during his first marriage.

His father, J. Ernest Wilkins Sr., served as US Assistant Secretary of Labor during the Eisenhower administration.

Wilkins is the uncle of two notable attorneys: David B. Wilkins, a professor at the Harvard Law School, and Timothy A. Wilkins, a partner with Freshfields Bruckhaus Deringer. In 2010 a niece of Wilkins, Carolyn Marie Wilkins, Professor of Music at the Berklee College of Music in Boston, wrote of Wilkins' father and her family more generally in her biography Damn Near White: An African American Family's Rise from Slavery to Bittersweet Success.

== Death and legacy ==
Wilkins died on May 1, 2011, in Fountain Hills, Arizona. He was buried at the National Memorial Cemetery, Cave Creek, Arizona, on May 5.

Wilkins is portrayed by Ronald Auguste in the 2023 film Oppenheimer, named one of the top-ten films of 2023 by the National Board of Review and the American Film Institute.

== Tributes and honors ==
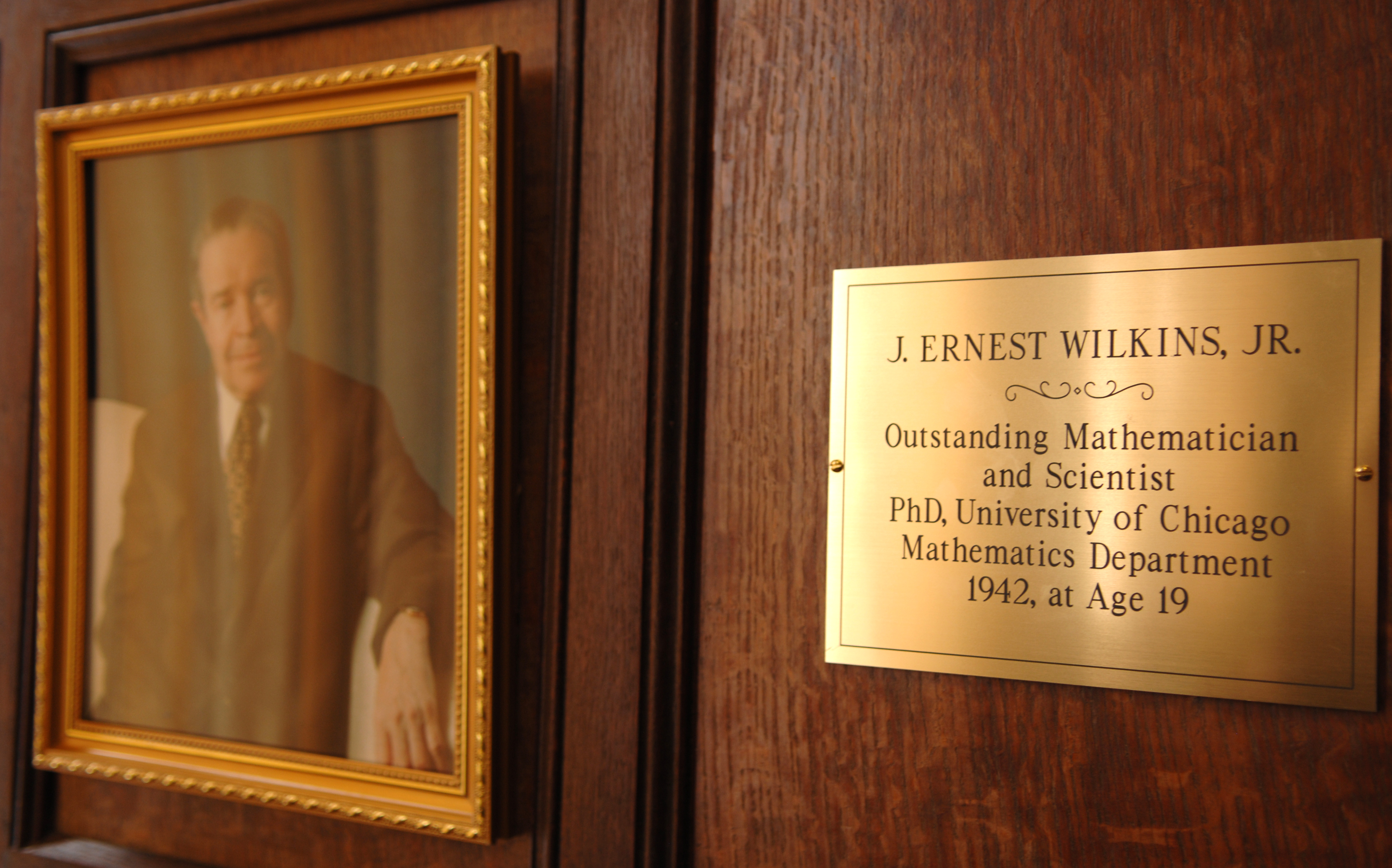
Wilkins portrait and plaque honoring him in the Eckhart Hall Tea Room of the Physical Sciences Division, University of Chicago in 2007 (courtesy: Dan Dry)

- The Wilkins effect, plus the Wigner–Wilkins and Wilkins spectra, discovered during the 1940s, are named or co-named after him;
- In March 2007 Wilkins was honored by his alma mater, the University of Chicago, in a special ceremony that included the dedication of his portrait and a plaque in the Eckhart Hall Tea Room of its Physical Sciences Division;
- U.S. Army Outstanding Civilian Service Medal, 1980;
- NAM, Honorary Life Member, Lifetime Achievement Award, 1994;
- QEM Network, Giant in Science Award, 1994;
- Department of Energy, Special Recognition Award, 1996;
- University of Chicago Alumni Association, Professional Achievement Citation, 1997.

== Memberships ==
Some of Wilkins's memberships included:

- Kappa Alpha Psi fraternity 1938
- National Academy of Engineering, Member, elected in 1976;
- American Society of Mechanical Engineers;
- American Nuclear Society, Board of Directors, 1967–77, President, 1974–75;
- National Research Council of the United States, Advisory Committee on Reactor Safeguards, Chairman, 1990–94;
- Oak Ridge Associated Universities, council, 1990;
- U.S. Army Science Board, chairman, 1970–2001.
- Original Forty Club of Chicago, Treasurer 1986; Secretary 1990

== Selected writings and other works ==
As listed in this work:

Texts

- with Robert L. Hellens and Paul E. Zweifel, "Status of Experimental and Theoretical Information on Neutron Slowing-Down Distributions in Hydrogenous Media," in Proceedings of the International Conference on the Peaceful Uses of Atomic Energy, United Nations, 1956;
- "The Landau Constants," in Progress in Approximation Theory, Nevai, Paul and Allan Pinkus, eds., Academic Press, 1991;
- with E. P. Wigner, Effect of the Temperature of the Moderator on the Velocity Distribution of Neutrons With Numerical Calculations for H as a Moderator, in The Collected Works of Eugene Paul Wigner, Springer-Verlag, 1992;
- "Mean Number of Real Zeroes of a Random Trigonometric Polynomial. II," in Topics in Polynomials of One or Several Variables and Their Applications, World Scientific Publishing, 1993.

Periodicals

- with Herbert Goldstein and L. Volume Spencer, Systematic Calculations of Gamma-Ray Penetration, Physical Review, 1953;
- "The Silverman Necessary Condition for Multiple Integrals in the Calculus of Variations", Proceedings of the American Mathematical Society, 1974;
- "A Variational Problem in Hilbert Space, " Applied Mathematics and Optimization, 1975–76;
- with Keshav N. Srivastava, "Minimum Critical Mass Nuclear Reactors, Part I and Part II", Nuclear Science and Engineering, 1982;
- with J. N. Kibe, "Apodization for Maximum Central Irradiance and Specified Large Rayleigh Limit of Resolution II ", Journal of the Optical Society of America A, Optics and Image Science, 1984;
- "A Modulus of Continuity for a Class of Quasismooth Functions", Proceedings of the American Mathematical Society, 1985;
- "An Asymptotic Expansion for the Expected Number of Real Zeros of a Random Polynomial", Proceedings of the American Mathematical Society, 1988;
- "An Integral Inequality", Proceedings of the American Mathematical Society, 1991;
- with Shantay A. Souter "Mean Number of Real Zeros of a Random Trigonometric Polynomial. III", Journal of Applied Mathematics and Stochastic Analysis, 1995;
- "The Expected Value of the Number of Real Zeros of a Random Sum of Legendre Polynomials", Proceedings of the American Mathematical Society, 1997;
- "Mean Number of Real Zeros of a Random Trigonometric Polynomial IV", Journal of Applied Mathematics and Stochastic Analysis, 1997;
- "Mean Number of Real Zeros of a Random Hyperbolic Polynomial", International Journal of Mathematics and Mathematical Sciences, 2000.

Other work

- "Optimization of Extended Surfaces for Heat Transfer", video recording, American Mathematical Society, 1994.

Biographies

- J. Ernest Wilkins Jr., MAA Online website, November 19, 2003, originally published in the National Association of Mathematicians NAM Newsletter, Fall Issue, 1994;
- J. Ernest Wilkins Jr., Mathematicians of the African Diaspora, State University of New York at Buffalo, November 19, 2003;
- O'Connor, J.J. & Robertson, E. F., Jesse Ernest Wilkins Jr., MacTutor History of Mathematics Archive, April 2002;
- Agwu, Nkechi & Nkwanta, Asamoah, African Americans in Mathematics: DIMACS Workshop, June 26–28, 1996, ed. by Nathaniel Dean, NSF Science and Technology Center in Discrete Mathematics and Theoretical Computer Science, AMS Bookstore, 1997, ISBN 978-0821806784;
- Agwu, Nkechi & Nkwanta, Asamoah, "Dr. J Ernest Wilkins Jr.: The Man and His Works: Mathematician, Physicist and Engineer", Nathaniel Dean, ed., African Americans in Mathematics, (Providence, RI: American Mathematical Society, 1997), pp. 195–205;
- "J. Ernest Wilkins Jr.", Notable Scientists from 1900 to the Present, Gale, 2001.
- Kessler, James H., Kidd, J. S., Kidd, Renée A. & Morin, Katherine A., Distinguished African American Scientists of the 20th Century, Oryx Press, 1996, pp. 331–334, ISBN 978-0897749558.
- Tubbs, Vincent. "Adjustment of a Genius." Ebony Magazine, February 1958, pp. 60–67.
- Newell, V.K., editor. Black Mathematicians and Their Works, 1980.

== See also ==
- List of African-American inventors and scientists
- J. Ernest Wilkins Sr., Wilkins' father and the first African American to participate in White House cabinet-level meetings
