= Mathematicians of the African Diaspora =

Website of African Mathematicians

Mathematicians of the African Diaspora (MAD) is a website created in 1997 by Scott W. Williams of the University at Buffalo, SUNY dedicated to promoting and highlighting the contributions of members of the African diaspora to mathematics, especially contributions to current mathematical research.

== History ==
Williams retired in 2008 and it was left to others to continue the website he had spent 11 years building. An initial town hall meeting about the future of the MAD Pages took place at a Conference for African American Researchers in the Mathematical Sciences (CAARMS). This led to an informal group of mathematicians who decided to work together to preserve Williams’ work. In 2015, the National Association of Mathematicians (NAM) formed an ad hoc committee to update the MAD Pages, consisting of Edray Goins as NAM President, Committee Co-Chairs Don King (Northeastern University) and Asamoah Nkwanta (Morgan State University), and web developer John Weaver (Varsity Software).

The site was officially relaunched on October 9, 2020. MAD is supported by the National Association of Mathematicians (NAM) and the Educational Advancement Foundation (EAF). Since 1997 the MAD pages have been viewed by more than 20 million people.
