= David Hunter (disambiguation) =

David Hunter (1802–1886) was a U.S. Army general in the American Civil War.

David Hunter may also refer to:

- David Hunter of Blackness (died 1809), subject of a famous portrait by Sir Henry Raeburn
- David Hunter (Queensland politician) (1858–1927), Queensland politician
- David Hunter (English cricketer) (1860–1927), English cricketer
- David Ferguson Hunter (1891–1965), Scottish recipient of the Victoria Cross
- David Hunter (New South Wales politician) (1905–1981), New South Wales politician
- Dave Hunter (politician) (1912–1985), Canadian politician
- David Hunter (Royal Marines officer) (1919–2001), British Royal Marines officer
- David Lee Hunter (1933–2001), American mathematician and educator
- Dave Hunter (born 1958), Canadian ice hockey player
- David Hunter (epidemiologist), Oxford University, former administrator at Harvard T.H. Chan School of Public Health
- David Hunter (New Zealand cricketer) (born 1968), New Zealand cricketer
- David Hunter (American football) (born 1989), American football defensive tackle
- David Hunter (actor), British actor

== See also ==
- Hunter (surname)
