= Warren Buck =

African American physicist

Warren Wesley Buck III
- Born: February 16, 1946 (age 80); Washington, D.C.
- Education: Morgan State University (BS); College of William & Mary (MS, PhD)
- Scientific career
- Workplaces: Stony Brook University; Hampton University; University of Washington Bothell
- Thesis: Calculation of deuteron wave functions with relativistic interactions (1976)
- Doctoral advisor: Franz Gross
- Notable students: Devin G. Walker; Aziza Baccouche

Warren Wesley Buck III (born 16 February 1946) is an American physicist. He is credited with establishing the physics PhD program at Hampton University, a historically Black college in Hampton, Virginia, which was also the campus's first PhD program in any subject. Buck was also the first chancellor of University of Washington-Bothell and oversaw the university's transition to a four-year institution. His research focuses on nuclear and subatomic particles, including studies of the interactions between particles and anti-particles and the nature of mesons and the quark model.

== Early life and family ==
Buck was born on 16 February 1946 at Freedman's Hospital in Washington, D.C., to Warren W. Buck, Jr. and Mildred George Buck and has one younger brother, Lawrence Buck.

Both of his parents grew up in the Midwest: Warren Buck, Jr., had been raised in St. Louis, Missouri, and Mildred Buck in the Chicago suburbs. Mildred had been one of the few Black students to attend Evanston Township High School. Warren and Mildred met while studying at Lincoln University in Jefferson City, Missouri, in a calculus class taught by Walter Richard Talbot. Talbot would later be a professor for Warren Buck III at Morgan State University. Warren Buck, Jr., was the first Black person hired to work as a draftsman for the Weather Bureau (which later was incorporated into the National Oceanic and Atmospheric Administration), and Mildred Buck worked as a daycare center director and was one of the first Head Start teachers.

All of Buck's uncles served in World War II, some of them as Tuskegee Airmen.

== Education ==
Growing up in Washington, D.C., Buck attended schools in the area for his primary and secondary education. He graduated from Spingarn High School, where he ran track, in 1963. Spingarn was opened as a segregated high school for Black students in Washington, D.C., in 1952. While in school, Buck participated in Boy Scouts and was an Eagle Scout with Bronze Palm and Order of the Arrow. His father founded his Cub scout troop at the 15th Street Presbyterian Church in Washington, D.C., and his mother served as a den mother.

Buck went on to attend his parents' alma mater, Lincoln University, in Jefferson City, Missouri, on a partial scholarship to run on the track team. After two years at Lincoln, Buck transferred to Morgan State University in Baltimore, Maryland, where he began studying physics. In between changing schools, Buck worked as a waiter and bartender, and was eventually drafted for military service. However, upon applying and being accepted to Morgan State University, he was granted a deferral.

At Morgan State, Buck studied with Walter Talbot and Bob Dixon, who encouraged him to pursue doctoral studies. He graduated with a BSc in mathematics in 1968. That same year he enrolled at the College of William & Mary in Williamsburg, Virginia, to pursue graduate studies. In the summer of 1968, Buck worked at Johns Hopkins University, working with internal waves in Professor Owen Phillip's lab in the mechanical engineering department.

He graduated with an MSc in experimental and theoretical plasma physics from William & Mary in 1970. While at William & Mary, Buck founded and drafted the constitution for the college's Black Student Organization in 1969, where he also served as the group's first president. He was also a member of the Omicron Delta Kappa honor society during his time at the university.

After completing his master's degree, Buck temporarily dropped out of graduate school and went to teach mathematics at Bowie State University in Bowie, Maryland. During this time he also continued to be involved in civil rights causes. He returned in 1971 and completed his PhD in theoretical relativistic nuclear physics in 1976. While completing his PhD, he studied with Franz Gross, and serving on his thesis committee were Carl Carlson, Charles F. Perdrisat, George Rublein, and Hans von Baeyer. His thesis was titled "Calculation of deuteron wave functions with relativistic interactions."

== Career ==
After graduating from William and Mary, Buck was initially hired by Gerry Brown at Stony Brook University in Long Island, New York, as a physics instructor. Buck taught at Stony Brook for three years, during which for one month of the year he would travel to Los Alamos National Laboratory to work on projects.

From Stony Brook, he took on a yearlong appointment at the University of Paris in Orsay as a staff instructor. After living in Paris, he and his wife then spent three years commuting from the Bahamas to Annapolis, Maryland, while living on their boat, sailing, and selling their artwork.

=== Hampton University ===
After three years living at sea, Buck briefly returned to College of William and Mary, as construction would soon commence on the Thomas Jefferson National Accelerator Facility in nearby Newport News, Virginia. However, he soon approached Demetrius Venable at Hampton University about a position there, in the interest of bringing quality physics education to Black undergraduate students. Buck joined the Hampton staff as the fourth physics faculty member in 1984, and was appointed full professor in 1989. He is credited with establishing the physics PhD program at Hampton, which was also the university's first doctoral program in any subject. The program was also only one of five doctoral programs at any historically Black college or university at the time of its founding. Of founding the Hampton program, Buck said:

"Part of my goal when I moved to Hampton University was to get minorities in the door for…you know, to perform world-class physics up front so we don’t have to come at the last minute and say, “How do I fit in?” You start off fitting in. You just start off fitting in, right?"

At Hampton, Buck started the Hampton University Graduate Studies program (HUGS), a program for summer physics instruction for graduate students from outside universities. Buck recruited a number of physicists to speak at Hampton for this program, including Frank Close, Dirk Walecka, Jerry Friedman, and James Gates. He also founded the Undergraduate Institute in Physics/REU, a summer program for undergraduates, and established the Nuclear High Energy Physics Research Center for Excellence (NuHEP) in 1990, a research group based at Hampton. By the time Buck left Hampton, NuHEP had six senior researchers of professorial rank, four postdoctoral fellows, 21 graduate and undergraduate students, and four full time staff members. Throughout his career he was also a member of the development team of the Jefferson Lab.

In 1997, Buck was featured in the "Way Cool Scientist" segment of the television show Bill Nye the Science Guy, in Season 5, episode 8, "Atoms and Molecules."

=== University of Washington-Bothell ===
In June 1999, Buck was offered a position at the University of Washington-Bothell, and was appointed as chancellor and dean of the university. He served in the position for six years, during which he oversaw the university's transition to a four-year institution. The university also debuted its permanent campus in 2000 during Buck's tenure. After serving as chancellor until June 2005, he began teaching physics at the University of Washington-Seattle. In 2009 he returned to the Bothell campus and became director of the university's science and technology program. Since leaving the chancellorship in 2005, he has been appointed a chancellor emeritus at UW-Bothell. He occasionally taught physics courses until 2013, his full retirement.

=== Leadership roles and other activities ===
In 2013, he was awarded with an honorary degree by the College of William and Mary, and sat on the university's Board of Visitors from 2016 until 2020. He currently serves as special advisor for equity in the 21st century to President Katherine A. Rowe.

Throughout his teaching career and into the present, Buck has been active in various professional appointments: from 2007 to 2008, he served as co-chair of the Committee on New Opportunities in Solar System Exploration of NASA’s New Frontiers Program; he has served on the Committee on Education of the American Physical Society; on the board of directors of the Thomas Jefferson National Accelerator Facility’s Users Group; and on the board of directors of the Pacific Science Center.

== Awards ==
- Fellow of the American Physical Society (1998)
- “Giant in Science,” Quality Education for Minorities Network (2001)
- Strong Men & Women in Virginia History honoree, Library of Virginia and Dominion Energy (2018)
- Hulon Willis Association Impact Award, College of William and Mary

== Personal life ==
As a student at William and Mary, Buck participated in the college's theater scene, as a member of the Williamsburg Players and in the university's theater department. He was a classmate of Glenn Close at the time.

Buck is an accomplished sailor. He is also a watercolor painter, which he initially learned from Nándor Balász, who was Albert Einstein's assistant at Princeton University and Erwin Schrodinger’s assistant in Ireland. While on sailing trips, Buck learned how to paint underwater, and has taught courses on the subject. He also practices Buddhist meditation.

Buck married his first wife Francine as an undergraduate and they had a son, Eric. His second wife was Linda Horn, with whom he had one daughter. In 2006, he married his third wife, Cate Buck. Together, they have four adult children and four grandchildren.

== Select publications ==
- "Family of relativistic deuteron wave functions," Physical Review (1979) - with Franz Gross
- "New constraints on dispersive form factor parameterizations from the timelike region", Physical Review (1998) - with Richard Lebed
- "The pion and kaon charge form factors," Bulletin of the American Physical Society (1993)
