= Walter Talbot =

Walter Talbot may refer to:

- Walter Carpenter, also known as Walter Cecil Talbot, Royal Navy officer
- Walter Richard Talbot, African American mathematician
