= Genevieve M. Knight =

African-American mathematician (1939–2021)

Genevieve Madeline Knight
- Born: 18 June 1939; Brunswick, Georgia
- Died: August 19, 2021 (aged 82); Silver Spring, Maryland
- Education: Fort Valley State College (1961); Atlanta University (1963); University of Maryland (1970)
- Scientific career
- Fields: Mathematics education
- Workplaces: Hampton Institute; Coppin State College
- Thesis: The Effect of a Sub-Culturally Appropriate Language upon Achievement in Mathematical Content
- Academic advisors: Henry Walbasser; Abdulalim A. Shabazz

Genevieve Madeline Knight (June 18, 1939 – August 19, 2021) was an American mathematics educator.

== Education and career ==
Knight was the youngest of three sisters who all became mathematics and science educators, daughters of a seamstress and a civil service radar specialist. As a freshman at Fort Valley State College in 1957, Knight was studying home economics when the Sputnik launch created a big push for more American students to become educated in mathematics and the sciences. Knight transferred to mathematics, "because it had fewer labs than any of the sciences", and graduated in 1961.

She completed a master's degree in 1963 at Atlanta University, under the supervision of Abdulalim A. Shabazz, and took a teaching position at the Hampton Institute, also becoming an NSF fellow, a position that allowed her to travel and meet with other college mathematics teachers. In 1966, she returned to graduate school, and completed a doctorate in mathematics education in 1970 at the University of Maryland, College Park under the supervision of Henry H. Walbesser.

Returning from her doctorate, Knight remained at the Hampton Institute, where she became chair of mathematics and computer science. In 1985 she moved to Coppin State College as a full professor. She retired in 2006.

== Recognition ==
In 1980, the Virginia Council of Teachers of Mathematics named Knight as their College Teacher of the Year. In 1993 she was named Maryland Mathematics Teacher of the Year, and the Mathematical Association of America gave Knight a Distinguished Teaching Award. In 1996 the University System of Maryland named her as that year's Wilson H. Elkins Distinguished Professor. The National Council of Teachers of Mathematics gave her their 1999 lifetime achievement award for her service to mathematics education, outspoken support of equity "regardless of ethnicity, gender, or socioeconomic background", and distinguished teaching. She was the 2013 Cox–Talbot Lecturer of the National Association of Mathematicians, one of the member societies of the Conference Board of the Mathematical Sciences. In 2018 the Association for Women in Mathematics named her as one of their inaugural Fellows.
