= J. Ernest Wilkins Sr. =

American lawyer (1894–1959)

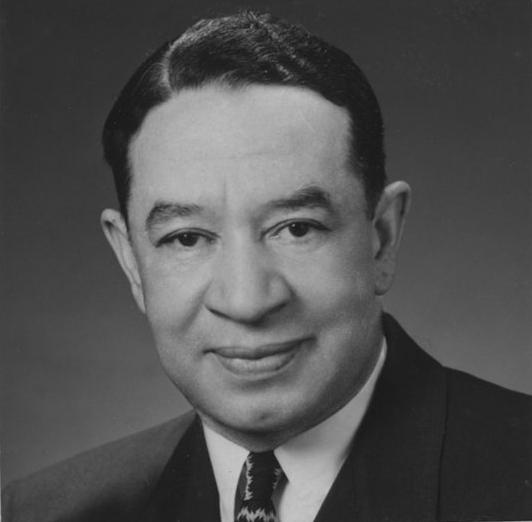
- J. Ernest Wilkins Sr.

United States Assistant Secretary of Labor for International Labor Affairs
- In office March 12, 1954 – November 6, 1958
- President: Dwight D. Eisenhower
- Preceded by: Spencer Miller Jr.
- Succeeded by: George C. Lodge

Personal details
- Born: February 1, 1894 Farmington, Missouri
- Died: January 19, 1959 (aged 64) Washington, D.C.
- Resting place: Lincoln Cemetery
- Party: Republican
- Spouse: Lucille Robinson (m. 1922)
- Children: 3 sons, including J. Ernest Wilkins Jr.
- Education: University of Illinois; University of Chicago
- Known for: Labor leader, civil rights activism

Jesse Ernest Wilkins Sr. (February 1, 1894 – January 19, 1959) was a U.S. lawyer, labor leader, assistant secretary of the United States Department of Labor in the Eisenhower administration and both the first African-American to be appointed to a sub-cabinet position in the United States Government and to attend White House cabinet meetings as the representative of a government department.

After a falling-out with Secretary of Labor James P. Mitchell, Wilkins resigned from his sub-cabinet post in 1958, but continued to serve on the U.S. Civil Rights Commission.

== Education and early career ==
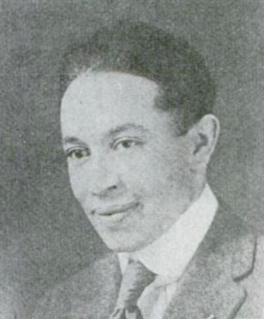
J.E. Wilkins, 1918

Wilkins was the son of a Missouri Baptist preacher. He studied mathematics at the University of Illinois and then attended the University of Chicago Law School in the 1920s. He was a member of its Phi Beta Kappa Society and then practiced law locally for several years.

== Public service ==
In 1954, Wilkins was appointed by President Dwight D. Eisenhower as Assistant Secretary of Labor for International Labor Affairs thus becoming the first African-American to attend cabinet meetings as the representative of a department in the absence of his superiors, Labor Secretary James Mitchell and Undersecretary Arthur Larson. Wilkins had previously served the Eisenhower administration as acting chairman of the President's Committee on Government Contracts at the request of Val Washington.

During his tenure with the administration he was a member of Equality Committee, working with E. Frederic Morrow, Val Washington, Joseph Douglas, James Nabrit Jr. and Samuel Pierce. Still earlier he had been a member of Eisenhower's President's Committee on Governmental Employment Policy (PCGEP) board when he was with the Labor Department.

In 1957, Labor Secretary Mitchell began working toward having Wilkins removed from his post, beginning by having Wilkins appointed to the U.S. Civil Rights Commission, where he became the first Black member.

When Wilkins did not immediately resign, Mitchell applied pressure. He pushed back against a position paper that Wilkins proposed to deliver to the 1958 meeting of the U.N.'s International Labour Organization, then announced three days before the conference that Wilkins would be excluded from the meeting. Three days after the US delegation left for Geneva without him, Wilkins had a heart attack that hospitalized him for three months. Returning to work in July, 1958, he no longer had a full-time secretary.

On August 5, 1958, Wilkins met with President Eisenhower to plead for his job, saying that he needed six more months to qualify for a civil service pension. (The Civil Rights Commission job was unpaid.) Eisenhower's response was that Mitchell was entitled to replace Wilkins. On November 6, 1958, Wilkins submitted his resignation and Mitchell named his replacement: George C. Lodge, the 35-year-old son of Henry Cabot Lodge.

After resigning from his sub-cabinet post, Wilkins continued to serve on the Civil Rights Commission until his death two months later from another heart attack.

While investigating charges that Black voting rights had been violated, his work with the six-member Civil Rights Commission was hampered in Montgomery, Alabama when he was refused accommodation at the hotel where the other commission members were staying. He subsequently found a room for himself at Maxwell Air Force Base. When the commission tried to subpoena county voting records, they discovered that then-Circuit Judge George Wallace had seized the records, and was threatening to jail any commission member who would interfere in his jurisdiction.

== Other achievements ==
In 1953, Wilkins became the first African American to serve on the nine-member Judicial Council of the Methodist Church (which one, there are several, the United Methodist Church did not then exist and never has been the only one), when he was elected its secretary. The body is Methodism's nominal and administrative head.

From 1954 to 1957, Wilkins served as U.S. representative on the governing body of the International Labour Organization. In 1959, Wilkins also became the first African-American president of the Judicial Council of the Methodist Church.

He also served as the Grand Polemarch (national president) of Kappa Alpha Psi fraternity.

== Personal life ==
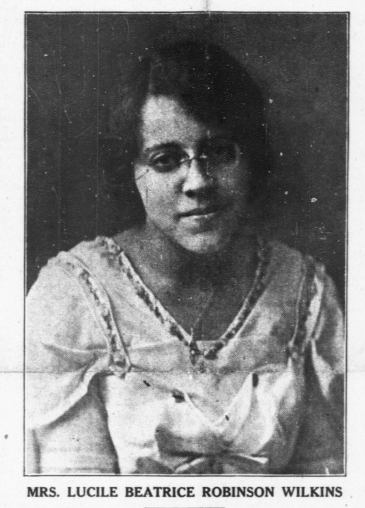
Lucille Robinson Wilkins, in her marriage announcement on December 2, 1922

Wilkins married Lucille Robinson (b. 1899 (?) - d. November 1964, Brooklyn, N.Y., aged 65), who taught school in Chicago, was secretary to the women's division of the Methodist Church, and who also practiced law with her husband for 33 years.

Together they raised three sons: J. Ernest Wilkins Jr., who achieved fame as a mathematician and nuclear scientist; John Robinson Wilkins, who attended University of Wisconsin at the age of 14, Harvard Law School at 19, was elected to the Harvard Law Review, and went on to serve President Kennedy as general counsel for the Agency for International Development (AID); and Julian B. Wilkins, who practiced general and corporate law.

Wilkins died as a result of a heart attack in Washington, D.C., in late January 1959, at the age of 64.

Wilkins is the grandfather of two notable attorneys: David B. Wilkins, a professor at the Harvard Law School, and Timothy A. Wilkins, a partner with Freshfields Bruckhaus Deringer. In 2010 Wilkins' granddaughter, Carolyn Marie Wilkins, a Professor at the Berklee College of Music in Boston, wrote of her grandfather and her family more generally in her biography Damn Near White: An African American Family's Rise from Slavery to Bittersweet Success.

== See also ==
- Dwight D. Eisenhower
- George Wallace
