= Omayra Ortega =

American mathematician

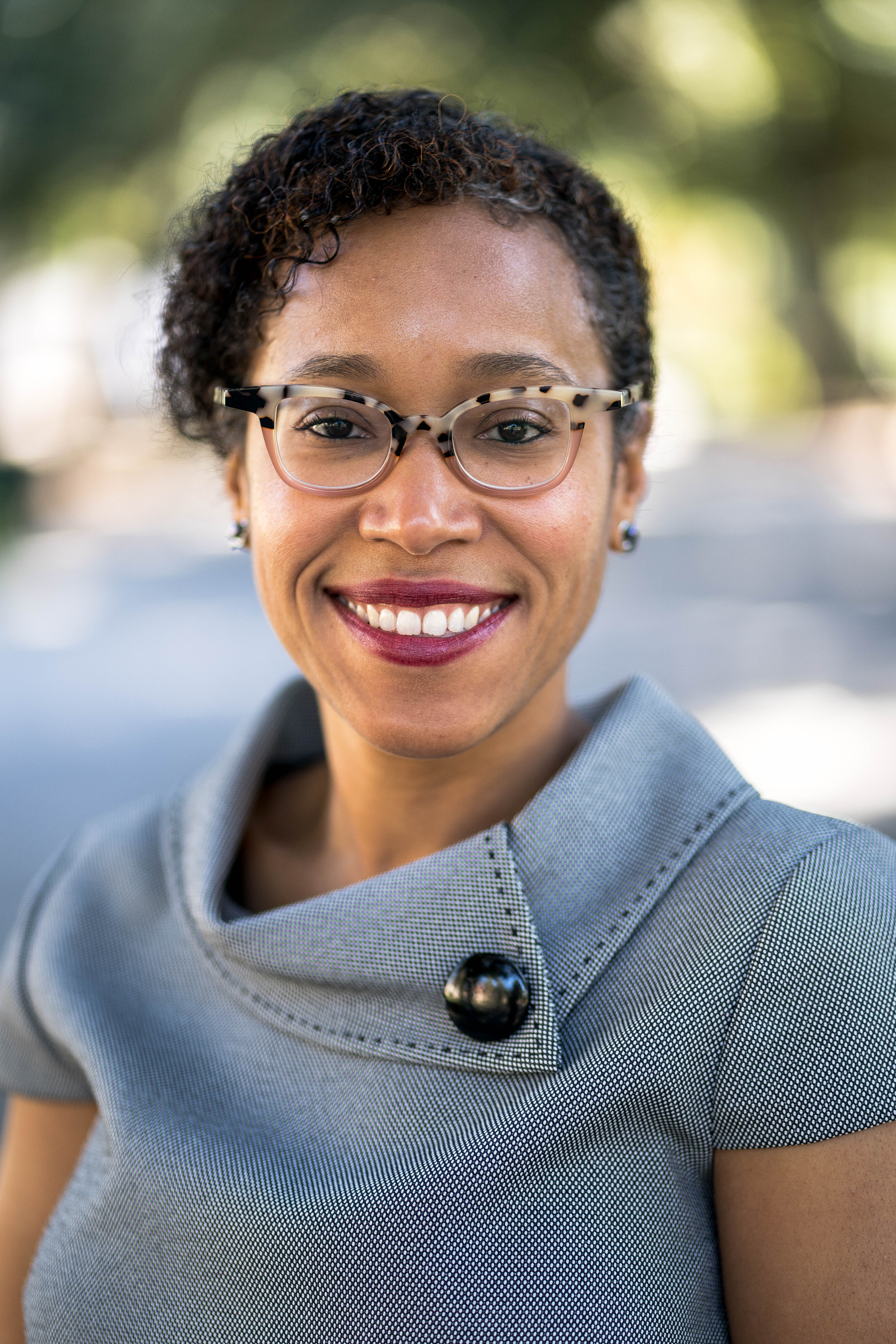
- Dr. Ortega in 2017
- Born: Queens, New York
- Education: Pomona College; University of Iowa
- Scientific career
- Fields: Mathematician
- Workplaces: Sonoma State University
- Doctoral advisor: Herbert W. Hethcote; Tong Li

Omayra Ortega is an American mathematician, specializing in mathematical epidemiology. Ortega is an associate professor of mathematics & statistics at Sonoma State University in Sonoma County, California, and serves on the Executive Committee of the Association for Women in Mathematics. Additionally, she served as president of the National Association of Mathematicians (NAM) from 2021-2024.

== Early life and education ==
Ortega was born in Far Rockaway, Queens, New York. Her parents are originally from Panama.

Omayra Ortega received bachelor's degrees in mathematics and music from Pomona College in 2001. She pursued graduate studies at the University of Iowa, where she earned a master's degree in 2005 and a PhD in 2008, both in the "Applied Mathematics & Computational Science" program, as well as a Master's in Public Health degree in 2005. Her dissertation was on mathematical epidemiology, titled "Evaluation of Rotavirus models with coinfection and vaccination"; her advisers were Herbert W. Hethcote and Tong Li.

== Career ==
In 2006 Ortega became an instructor of applied mathematics at Arizona State University and was promoted to assistant professor after she received her PhD in 2008. In 2017 Ortega became a visiting assistant professor of mathematics at her undergraduate institution Pomona College. In 2018 she became an assistant professor of mathematics and statistics at Sonoma State University. She is currently an Associate Professor and Assistant Dean of Research and Internships in the School of Science and Technology.

Ortega became the president of the National Association of Mathematicians, NAM, on February 1, 2021. Previously, she was the editor-in-chief of the NAM editorial board to the Mathematical Association of America MathValues blog, as well as editor of the NAM Newsletter. and chair of the NAM Publicity and Publications Committee from 2018 to 2021.

Ortega has been featured in the PBS show SciGirls.

== Awards and recognition ==
In 2020 Ortega was named an Association for Women in Mathematics (AWM) Service Award recipient. She was also recognized by Mathematically Gifted & Black as a Black History Month 2020 Honoree. In 2023, she became an AWM fellow "for her dedication to providing opportunities for under-represented groups, especially women and girls, to become involved in and advance in the mathematical sciences; for her outreach work at regional and national levels; for being an exceptional mentor and role model; and for her commitment to advancing the mission of AWM."

== Personal life ==
Ortega trains in Capoiera.
