= Joella Gipson =

American musician, mathematician, and educator

- Born: January 8, 1929; California, Los Angeles
- Died: January 31, 2012 (aged 83); Windsor, California
- Occupation: Professor at Wayne State University in 1972
- Known for: She was an American musician, mathematician, and educator who became the first African American student at Mount St. Mary's College
- Notable work: Consumer and Career Mathematics, Black Mathematicians and their Works, Impetus (1978), the Black Woman: Proceedings of the Fourth National Congress of Black Women of Canada (1978), and Changing Faces of Romania (2000).
- Spouse(s): Theodore Horace Gipson who died in Los Angeles in 1972. Then she remarried to William Lawrence Simpson, in 1980 who then died in 2005
- Awards: Outstanding alumna of the year for 1990 And In 1993, she won the Wayne State University Alumni Faculty Service Award

Joella Hardeman Gipson-Simpson (January 8, 1929 – January 31, 2012) was an American musician, mathematician, and educator who became the first African American student at Mount St. Mary's College in Los Angeles.

== Early life and music education ==
Joella Hardeman was born in Los Angeles on January 8, 1929, and began studying music at age eight. After graduating from Saint Agnes High School, a Catholic school in Los Angeles that operated from 1919 to 1953, she entered Mount St. Mary's College, becoming the first African American student accepted there. She majored in music performance and minored in English and philosophy, graduating in 1950, and won a graduate scholarship to the State University of Iowa, where she earned a master's degree in music education in 1951.

With this, she began a career in music education, teaching at a number of institutions, including Southern University in Baton Rouge, Louisiana, where she was listed in 1955 as a faculty sponsor for the local chapter of the Music Educators National Conference. At Southern University, she met Theodore Horace Gipson, who became her husband and the father of her daughter.

== Later life and mathematics education ==
Joella Gipson and her husband moved back to Los Angeles, and Joella Gipson became a teacher and supervisor for the Los Angeles Unified School District. It was in this part of her life that her interests shifted to mathematics, and she became certified as a mathematics teacher, regularly attending National Science Foundation sponsored mathematics institutes from 1958 to 1969. Her husband Theodore Gipson died in Los Angeles in 1972.

In 1971, Gipson earned a doctorate in mathematics education from the University of Illinois Urbana-Champaign, with the dissertation Teaching probability in the elementary school: an exploratory study, supervised by John A. Easley Jr. Her dissertation also cites the mentorship of Max Beberman, who died before it could be completed. After completing her doctorate, she became an associate professor at Wayne State University in 1972, and was promoted to full professor in 1978. She served as a Fulbright Scholar in Belize in 1994, and again in Romania in 1998. At Wayne State, she also directed the master's program in teaching, the Women, Minorities, and Handicapped Program in Education, and a mathematics education institute, and chaired a commission on the status of women at the university.

Gipson married her second husband, William Lawrence Simpson, in 1980. While teaching at Wayne State, she lived across the nearby Canadian border in Windsor, Ontario. Her husband died in 2005, and she retired as a professor emerita after 35 years of service at Wayne State in 2007. She died in Windsor on January 31, 2012.

== Books ==
Gipson was the coauthor of Consumer and Career Mathematics (with L. Carey Bolster and H. Douglas Woodburn, Scott & Foresman, 1978) and Black Mathematicians and Their Works (with Virginia Newell, L. Waldo Rich, and Beauregard Stubblefield, Dorrance & Company, 1980). She also edited Impetus, the Black Woman: Proceedings of the Fourth National Congress of Black Women of Canada (1978), and self-published Changing Faces of Romania (2000).

== Recognition ==
Mount St. Mary's College named Gipson their outstanding alumna of the year for 1990. In 1993, she won the Wayne State University Alumni Faculty Service Award "for her outstanding work on behalf of women, minorities, and the disabled in educational leadership programs". In 2010, the Wayne State University Center for Peace and Conflict Studies gave her their lifetime achievement award.

A scholarship at Wayne State University, the Joella Gipson Endowed Scholarship for Peace and Human Rights Education, is named for her.
