= Wade Ellis =

American mathematician

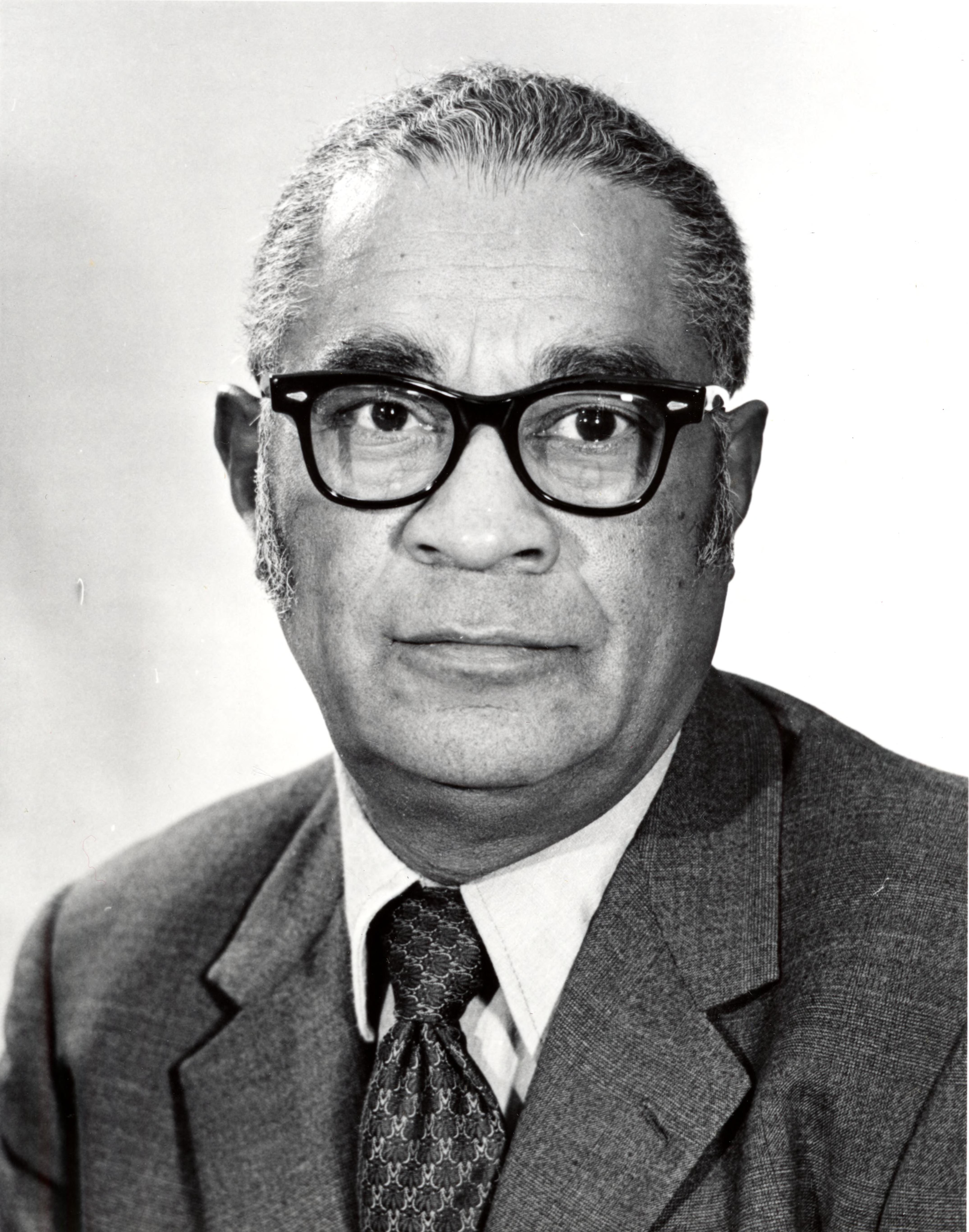
- Ellis, c. 1970
- Born: June 9, 1909; Chandler, Oklahoma, US
- Died: November 20, 1989 (aged 80); San Jose, California, US
- Other names: Wade Ellis, Sr.
- Education: Wilberforce University (B.S., 1928); University of New Mexico (M.S. 1938); University of Michigan (Ph.D. 1944)
- Occupation: Mathematician
- Years active: 1944–1989
- Known for: Linear algebra; Math education
- Notable work: On Relations Satisfied by Linear Operators on a Three Dimensional Linear Vector Space (1944)
- Spouse: Agatha Ellis
- Children: 2

Wade Ellis (June 9, 1909 – November 20, 1989) was an American mathematician and educator. He taught at Fort Valley State University in Georgia and Fisk University in Nashville, Tennessee and earned his Ph.D. in mathematics from the University of Michigan in 1944. He carried out classified research on radar antennas at the MIT Lincoln Laboratory and taught at Boston University and Oberlin College, where he became Full Professor in 1953. The same year, he was elected to the Board of Governors of the Mathematical Association of America.

Ellis promoted mathematical education and was decorated for his efforts in 1966 by the government of Peru. He returned to the University of Michigan in 1967 as Associate Dean of the Graduate School and Professor of Mathematics until his retirement in 1977, when he was named professor emeritus. Afterwards, he served in various administrative positions including vice chancellor of academic affairs at University of Maryland Eastern Shore and interim president of Marygrove College in Detroit.

== Family history and life ==
Wade Ellis' father, Whitfield Washington, was born on September 26, 1870, in Sumter County, Alabama. In the mid-1880s, a confrontation involving Whitfield and several white men resulted in two white men dying. He escaped a possible lynching by making his way south to Mobile, Alabama and finding work as a cook on an international trade ship where he traveled to the Caribbean and the west coast of Africa. He eventually returned to the United States and moved to Oklahoma, changing his name to Whit Ellis and opening a restaurant. Wade Ellis' mother, Maggie Ellis, was born on August 25, 1880, in Dallas, Texas. Her father, James Riley, was likely born into slavery in New Orleans, Louisiana in 1844 before joining the Union Army towards the end of the American Civil War and eventually becoming a Buffalo Soldier. As a child Maggie attended an integrated school for white and Indian children and from 1898 to 1899 she attended high school at the Colored Agriculture and Normal University at Langston, Oklahoma, now known as Langston University. She met Whit in 1899 and the two were married in 1900.

Wade Ellis was born in Chandler, Oklahoma on June 9, 1909, one of ten children. As a child he worked at his family's restaurant, doing chores such as cleaning fish and shucking corn. He took up the trombone and played in a family band. Ellis excelled academically and attended Douglass School, graduating at 14. He received his bachelor's degree from Wilberforce University, Ohio in 1929, at age 18, his master's degree from the University of New Mexico in 1938, and his Ph.D. from the University of Michigan in 1944. After moving to Ann Arbor in 1939, he purchased a home in 1941 with the help of a $300 ($5514 in 2019 value) loan from his barber.

He died of a heart attack on November 20, 1989, in San Jose, California.

== Career ==
Ellis earned his master's degree from the University of New Mexico in 1938, though he was forced to march at the end of his graduation line because of his race. When he was invited to speak and have dinner at the Texas Section of the American Mathematical Society, black people were not allowed to dine with the Section. Worried at offending their guest, mathematicians Paul K. Rees, who invited Ellis, and C.V. Newsom, who was then-chair at New Mexico, arranged the seating so that the two of them, along with another individual from New Mexico, would leave an empty seat for Ellis at dinner in hopes that the seating would not be noticed. It passed without incident, and Ellis inadvertently became the first black mathematician to have dinner with the Texas Section.

In 1938, he presented The efficiency of approximation formulas for determining the rate of interest in amortization schedules to the Southwestern Section of the Mathematics Association of America (MAA). He began teaching in a one-room schoolhouse in Oklahoma, and taught at the Boys Industrial School in Boley, Oklahoma, Fort Valley State College in Georgia, and at Fisk University in Nashville, Tennessee, all of which were segregated. He received a Rosenwald Fellowship.

In 1939, he moved with his wife Agatha and newborn son William Whit to Ann Arbor, Michigan to begin his doctorate at the University of Michigan. At the time only a few schools in the country accepted black students, and it was among the best-known. The school still had many segregation policies and issues with racism, but compared to others he believed it treated black students relatively well. He encouraged his brother Francis (Frank) Willis to enroll in a summer program at the school, and Frank eventually became a research assistant and also enrolled at the school. Under the supervision of George Yuri Rainich, he finished his Ph.D. in mathematics in 1944, and became the twelfth African-American to do so in the United States. His thesis, On Relations Satisfied by Linear Operators on a Three Dimensional Linear Vector Space, was designated the "best in his department". Despite his excellent scholarly record, unlike other Ph.D. candidates he did not receive a teaching fellowship, and as a teaching assistant he was only paid 20% of what white teaching assistants earned.

From 1944 to 1948 he worked at the MIT Lincoln Laboratory as a Section Director, where he carried out classified research on radar antennas as well as detecting whether the Soviet Union had detonated atomic weapons. He taught at Boston University before becoming the first black faculty member at Oberlin College in 1948, where he stayed for 19 years. While at Oberlin, he also became a member of the city council and served one term as the town's Vice-Mayor. In 1953 he became a Full Professor, and was elected to the Board of Governors of the Mathematical Association of America, and in 1954 he presented his paper On the directional derivative and was elected as an officer of the organization's Program Committee.

In 1967 he became the Associate Dean of the Horace H. Rackham School of Graduate Studies and Professor of Mathematics at the University of Michigan, where he contributed to the Michigan Scholars Program. He consulted with several international groups on how to encourage mathematics education in developing countries, and in 1966 he was decorated by the government of Peru for his contributions to their higher education. On August 31, 1977, he retired from Michigan and was named Associate Dean Emeritus and Professor Emeritus of Mathematics.

He took on administrative positions elsewhere, including becoming vice chancellor of academic affairs at University of Maryland Eastern Shore and interim president of Marygrove College (Detroit). He wrote the foreword to Black Mathematicians and Their Works, which was published in 1980. The book was part of the push to eliminate inequities in math education of minority students, and Ellis wrote that it was fighting back against the beliefs held by teachers that promising young black students were incapable of being mathematicians.

== Awards ==
- Rosenwald Fellowship
- Comendador en la Orden de las Palmas Magisteriales del Peru (1966)
