= Roselyn E. Williams =

American mathematician

Dr. Roselyn Williams
- Born: November 1, 1950 (age 75); Tallahassee, FL, USA
- Education: Spelman College (BS), University of Florida (MS), Florida State University (PhD)
- Known for: Support & promotion of HBCU and her commitment to NAM
- Scientific career
- Doctoral advisor: Warren Douglas Nichols

Roselyn Elaine Williams is an American mathematician who is an associate professor and former chair of the mathematics department at Florida Agricultural and Mechanical University. Her decades long involvement in the National Association of Mathematicians includes a 14-year term as secretary-treasurer.

== Education ==
Williams attended Spelman College in Atlanta, Georgia, where she was mentored by Dr. Etta Falconer who was chair of the mathematics department at the time. She graduated in 1972 with a Bachelor of Science degree in mathematics. She then went to the University of Florida where she was the first African American master's degree student in mathematics. After some time away from school, she returned to her graduate studies at Florida State University and earned a PhD in 1988 under the advisement of Warren Douglas Nichols. Williams’ dissertation was in the field of finite dimensional Hopf algebras and she also has research interest in application of mathematics to physics and chemistry.

== Career ==
After earning her master's degree, Williams became an instructor at Florida A&M University (FAMU) in Tallahassee, Florida for five years before returning to graduate school to earn a PhD. She returned to FAMU as an associate professor of mathematics after completing her doctoral degree in 1988. While chair of the mathematics department, she co-founded the Alliance for the Production of African American PhDs in the Mathematical Sciences, which is now known as the National Alliance for Doctoral Studies in the Mathematical Sciences. Williams has been very involved in the National Association of Mathematicians (NAM), including serving as secretary-treasurer for NAM from 2005 to 2019. She has won several National Science Foundation grants, many for undergraduate research experiences as well as other programs at historically Black colleges and universities. In 2011, Williams was the local coordinator for the Enhancing Diversity in Graduate Education (EDGE) program, which support female students starting graduate degrees in mathematics.

== Honors ==
Williams was awarded the Dr. Etta Z. Falconer Award for Mentoring and Commitment to Diversity at the Infinite Possibilities Conference in 2012. In 2020, she became an Association for Women in Mathematics (AWM) fellow for "her lifelong promotion of Historically Black Colleges and Universities and support of the EDGE Program; for her unwavering dedication to the National Association of Mathematicians; and for her unsung work to create AIM/ICERM’s REUF and the National Math Alliance." Also in 2020, Williams was awarded the NAM Lifetime Achievement Award which is "given to a Mathematician-Mathematics Educator who has provided at least twenty-five years of exemplary service to the mathematical sciences community and who has affirmed by others as having been the kind of professional and role model whose professional life has made a difference, a professional life worthy of emulating."
