= Devin G. Walker =

American theoretical particle physicist

Devin George Edward Walker
- Education: Harvard University; Hampton University
- Scientific career
- Fields: Theoretical Physics; Particle Physics
- Workplaces: Dartmouth; Stanford Linear Accelerator Center; Stanford University; University of Washington
- Doctoral advisor: Nima Arkani-Hamed; Howard Georgi

Devin George Edward Walker is an American theoretical particle physicist, best known for his work on dark matter.

== Education ==
Devin Walker received his bachelor's degree in physics from Hampton University, where he studied with physics professor Warren Buck. He studied dark matter as a doctoral student at Harvard University under Nima Arkani-Hamed, culminating in the thesis "Theories on the Origin of Mass and Dark Matter". Walker became the first American-born and American-educated Black physicist to earn a doctorate from the Harvard Physics Department in 2005.

== Career ==
Walker was awarded the prestigious President's Postdoctoral Fellowship at the University of California at Berkeley, during which he worked on a framework to detect electroweak symmetry breaking from generic Large Hadron Collider (LHC) data. He went on to another postdoctoral appointment at Stanford, and a junior professorship at the University of Washington.

Walker is currently a research professor at the Dartmouth Department of Physics and Astronomy.

== Awards ==
- 2020 - Moore Prize from the American Physical Society
- 2011 - Ford Foundation Fellowship
- 2010 - LHC Theory Initiative Fellowship
