= Timothy A. Wilkins =

American lawyer

Timothy Wilkins
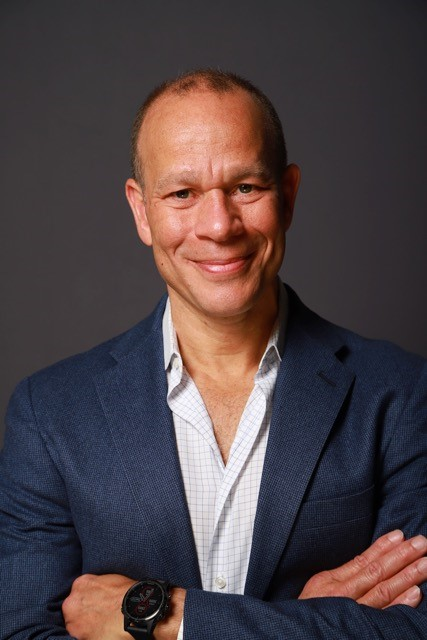
- Born: 1964 (age 61–62); Chicago, Illinois, U.S.
- Education: Harvard University (BA, JD, MBA)
- Relatives: David B. Wilkins (brother); J. Ernest Wilkins Jr. (uncle); J. Ernest Wilkins Sr. (grandfather)

Timothy A. Wilkins is an American lawyer and chair of the board of directors of New York Public Radio. He is a partner at the international law firm of Freshfields Bruckhaus Deringer and was the firm's first Black partner in the United States offices.

== Early life and education ==
Wilkins was born in 1964 and grew up in Chicago, IL. He graduated from the University of Chicago Laboratory School in 1982. Wilkins graduated magna cum laude from Harvard College in 1986 where he majored in sociology and was president of the Harvard Black Student Association.

Wilkins later earned a dual JD/MBA degree from the Harvard Law School and the Harvard Business School in 1993.

== Career ==
Wilkins began his career as an associate at Cleary Gottlieb Steen & Hamilton.

He joined Freshfields Bruckhaus Deringer in 1999 and spent eight years practicing law in the Tokyo office handling international transactions.

In 2016 Wilkins was named the Minority Lawyer of the Year in Private Practice by Chambers USA. He was listed as the highest-ranked lawyer on the Financial Times list of 100 Leading Ethnic Minority Executives and recognized by Empower as a leader on issues of racial justice and equality.

In 2019, Wilkins was selected to lead a global team at Freshfields focusing on sustainability, environmental and social issues. Their first assignment focused on ways to solve New York City's sustainability issues, such as waste, resources, climate change, and job creation. He later co-founded the New York Circular City Initiative, a program to develop a circular economic system that promotes greater employment and a greener environment for the city, including its less advantaged neighborhoods.

== Personal life ==
Wilkins is the brother of Harvard Law professor David B. Wilkins. His father, Julian Wilkins, was the first Black partner at a major law firm in Chicago. He is the grandson of J. Ernest Wilkins Sr. and the nephew of J Ernest Wilkins Jr.

He is active in several initiatives to broaden diversity in the law. He is the founding co-chair of the Steering Committee of The Opportunity Agenda, a non-profit organization dedicated to expanding equal opportunity. In 2020 he was named among the EMpower Top 100 Ethnic Minority Executive Role Models.

Wilkins has served on the Diversity and Inclusion Committee of the New York City Bar Association and was a member of the Council of Urban Professionals. He has served on several non-profit boards including the New York Public Theater, the City Bar Fund of the New York City Bar Association, and Equality Now. He was also a Committee Member of the Cyrus Vance Center for International Justice and was appointed to the board of New York City Global Partners by Mayor Bill De Blasio in 2015. The mayor later named Wilkins to serve on the New York City Economic Development Corporation.

In 2018, New York Public Radio, the owner of WNYC, the New York affiliate of National Public Radio, named Wilkins to their board. In 2021, Wilkins was named as chairman of the board of New York Public Radio following a string of high-profile incidents involving claims of harassment and discrimination.
