= Arved Deringer =

German lawyer and politician (1913–2011)

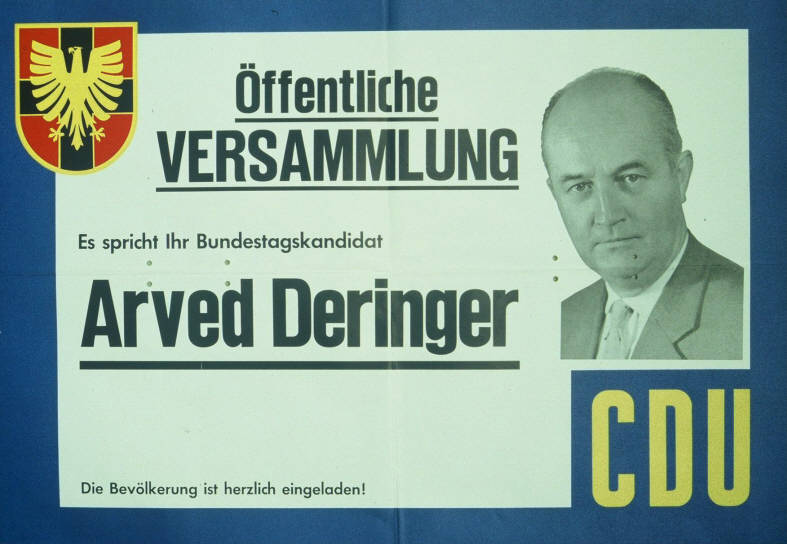
- Arved Deringer on a campaign poster for the 1961 federal elections

Member of the Bundestag
- In office 15 October 1957 – 19 October 1969
- Preceded by: Christian Leibing
- Succeeded by: Horst Ehmke
- Constituency: Calw (1957–1965); Stuttgart III (1965–1969)

Personal details
- Born: 4 June 1913 Berdiansk, Taurida Governorate, Russian Empire
- Died: 25 October 2011 (aged 98) Stuttgart, Germany
- Party: Christian Democratic Union
- Children: 5
- Education: University of Tübingen; Kiel University; University of Geneva; HU Berlin
- Occupation: Lawyer; politician

Arved Deringer (4 June 1913 – 25 October 2011) was a German lawyer and politician for the Christian Democratic Union (CDU). He was a member of the Bundestag from 1957 and 1969.

In 1952, Deringer partnered with Alfred Gleiss in a law firm that is now Gleiss Lutz. He left the firm in 1961, and partnered with Claus Tessin in Bonn. The firm, later known as Deringer Tessin Herrmann & Sedemund, merged with Freshfields and Bruckhaus Westrick Heller Loeber to form Freshfields Bruckhaus Deringer in 2000.
