= Lillian K. Bradley =

African-American mathematician

Lillian Katie Bradley
- Born: October 15, 1921; Tyler, Texas
- Died: February 11, 1995 (aged 73)
- Occupation: Mathematician
- Years active: 1938 - ???
- Known for: Being the first black woman to receive a mathematics doctorate from the University of Texas

Lillian Katie Bradley (October 15, 1921 – February 11, 1995) was an American mathematician and mathematics educator who in 1960 became the first African-American woman to earn a doctorate in any subject at the University of Texas at Austin. She accomplished this ten years after African-Americans were first admitted to the school, despite the discriminatory views of R. L. Moore an influential professor in the mathematics department at University of Texas at Austin.

== Education ==
Bradley was born in Tyler, Texas. She earned a bachelor's degree in mathematics in 1938 from Texas College, and a master's degree in mathematics education in 1946 from the University of Michigan. She completed her doctorate at the University of Texas in July 1960. Her dissertation, in mathematics education, was An Evaluation of the Effectiveness of a Collegiate General Mathematics Course.

== Career ==
Dr. Bradley held many teaching positions throughout her career. She was a teacher at a segregated Black high school in Hawkins, Texas. She also taught at Paul Quinn College, and at Texas College, before becoming an assistant professor of mathematics at Prairie View A&M College. There, in 1957–1958, she was awarded a National Science Faculty Fellowship, one of only 100 awarded in the inaugural year of the program. In 1962 she moved from Prairie View to Texas Southern University, as an associate professor.

Bradley died in February 1995 at the age of 76.
