= Scott W. Williams =

American mathematician

- Born: 22 April 1943 (age 83); Staten Island, New York National Science Foundation research grant, 1983–87 Chancellor's Award for Excellence in Teaching, State University of New York (1982) 1986–1987 Fulbright-Lecturer (Prague Czechoslovakia) 1997 Keynote Address, A Sly Fox Approach to Racism, Conference on Black History, Queens University, Kingston, Ontario, February 2004, selected as one of the 50 Most Important Blacks in Research Science. Professor Williams has published 32 papers, given more than eighty-five invited conference lectures, colloquia, and seminar lectures on his mathematics research at fifty-eight institutions in eight countries, and has lectured to high-ability high-school students.

Scott Williams (born April 22, 1943, in Staten Island, New York) is a professor of mathematics at the University at Buffalo, SUNY. He was recognized by Mathematically Gifted & Black as a Black History Month 2017 Honoree.

== Education ==
Raised in Baltimore, Maryland, Williams attended Morgan State University and earned his bachelor degree of Science in mathematics.

Before earning his bachelor's degree he was already able to solve four advanced problems in The Mathematical Monthly and co-authored two papers on Non-Associative Algebra with his undergraduate advisor Dr. Volodymyr Bohun-Chudinov. Scott Williams earned his Master's and Ph.D. in mathematics from Lehigh University in 1967 and 1969, respectively.

== Career ==
Williams served as a Research Associate in the Department of Mathematics at Pennsylvania State University – University Park, from 1969 to 1971. In 1971, he was chosen to be assistant professor of mathematics at the University at Buffalo and in 1985 was promoted to Full Professor at the university. In 1982, he won the New York Chancellor Award for Excellence in Teaching. In 2004, he was named one of the 50 Most Important Blacks in Research Science by Science Spectrum Magazine and Career Communications Group.

Williams primarily focused on topology and the field of mathematics. In 1975, he was the first topologist to apply the concept of scales (now known as b = d) to give a partial solution of the famous Box Product problem, which is still unsettled today. Dr. Williams was one of two founders of Black and Third World Mathematicians, which in 1971 became the National Association of Mathematicians. Together with William Massey of Lucent Technologies, Dr. Williams founded the Committee for African American Researchers in the Mathematical Sciences in 1997.

In 1997, Williams created the website Mathematicians of the African Diaspora (MAD) dedicated to promoting and highlighting the contributions of members of the African diaspora to mathematics, especially contributions to current mathematical research.

== Publications ==
=== Non-research publications ===
- Williams, Scott W. "Million-buck problems". Math. Intelligencer 24 (2002), no. 3, 17–20.
- Williams, Scott W. "Compact! A tutorial", Contemp. Math., 275, Amer. Math. Soc., 161–171, Providence, RI, 2001.
- Williams, Scott W. "Black research mathematicians in the United States". African Americans in mathematics, II (Houston, TX, 1998), Contemp. Math., 252, 165–168 Amer. Math. Soc., Providence, RI, 1999.
- Williams, Scott W. "Some dynamics on the irrationals. African Americans in mathematics" (Piscataway, NJ, 1996), 83–103, DIMACS Ser. Discrete Math. Theoret. Comput. Sci., 34, Amer. Math. Soc., Providence, RI, 1997.
- Williams, Scott W. "Box products". Handbook of set-theoretic topology, 169–200, North-Holland, Amsterdam-New York, 1984.

=== Research publications ===
1. Williams, Scott W.; Zhou, Haoxuan Order-like structure of monotonically normal spaces. Comment. Math. Univ. Carolin. 39 (1998), no. 1, 207–217.
2. Pelant, Jan and Williams, Scott W. Examples of recurrence. Papers on general topology and applications (Gorham, ME, 1995), 316–332, Ann. New York Acad. Sci., 806, New York Acad. Sci., New York, 1996.
3. Williams, Scott W.; Zhou, Hao Xuan Strong versions of normality. General topology and applications (Staten Island, NY, 1989), 379–389, Lecture Notes in Pure and Appl. Math., 134, Dekker, New York, 1991.
4. Roitman, Judith and Williams, Scott The paracompactness of spaces related to uncountable box products. Topology Proc. 15 (1990), 135–141.
5. Williams, S. W. Special points arising from self-maps. General topology and its relations to modern analysis and algebra, VI (Prague, 1986), 629–638, R & E Res. Exp. Math., 16, Heldermann, Berlin, 1988.
6. Yang, Shou Lian and Williams, Scott W. On box products of small ordinal spaces. Kexue Tongbao (English edn) 33 (1988), no. 7, 554–556.
7. Yang, Shou Lian and Williams, Scott W. On box products of small families of spaces of ordinal numbers. (Chinese) Kexue Tongbao (Chinese) 32 (1987), no. 14, 1051–1053.
8. Yang, Soulian and Williams, Scott W. On the countable box product of compact ordinals. Proceedings of the 1987 Topology Conference (Birmingham, AL, 1987). Topology Proc. 12 (1987), no. 1, 159–171.
9. Balcar, Bohuslav; Kalá\v sek, Pavel and Williams, Scott W. On the multiple Birkhoff recurrence theorem in dynamics. Comment. Math. Univ. Carolin. 28 (1987), no. 4, 607–612.
10. Friedler, L. M.; Martin, H. W.; Williams, S. W. Paracompact $C$-scattered spaces. Pacific J. Math. 129 (1987), no. 2, 277–296.
11. Williams, Scott W. More realcompact spaces. Rings of continuous functions (Cincinnati, Ohio, 1982), 289–300, Lecture Notes in Pure and Appl. Math., 95, Dekker, New York, 1985.
12. Williams, Scott W. Paracompactness in box products. Proceedings of the 12th winter school on abstract analysis (Srní, 1984). Rend. Circ. Mat. Palermo (2) 1984, Suppl. No. 6, 313–328.
13. Williams, S. W. Orderable subspaces of compact $F$-spaces. Topology and order structures, Part 2 (Amsterdam, 1981), 91–105, Math. Centre Tracts, 169, Math. Centrum, Amsterdam, 1983.
14. Williams, S. W. Coabsolutes of \v Cech\mhy Stone remainders and orderable spaces. General topology and its relations to modern analysis and algebra, V (Prague, 1981), 699–705, Sigma Ser. Pure Math., 3, Heldermann, Berlin, 1983.
15. van Mill, Jan; Williams, Scott W. A compact $F$-space not co-absolute with $\beta\bold N-\bold N$. Topology Appl. 15 (1983), no. 1, 59–64.
16. Williams, Scott Orderable subspaces of \v Cech-remainders. Proceedings of the 1982 Topology Conference (Annapolis, Md., 1982). Topology Proc. 7 (1982), no. 2, 301–327.
17. Williams, Scott W. Trees, Gleason spaces, and coabsolutes of $\beta {N}\sim {N}$. Trans. Amer. Math. Soc. 271 (1982), no. 1, 83–100.
18. Gewand, Marlene E. and Williams, Scott W. Covering properties of linearly ordered topological spaces and their products. Topology and order structures, Part 1 (Lubbock, Tex., 1980), pp. 119–132, Math. Centre Tracts, 142, Math. Centrum, Amsterdam, 1981.
19. Williams, Scott W. "Coabsolutes with homeomorphic dense subspaces". Canad. J. Math. 33 (1981), no. 4, 857–861.
20. Williams, Scott W. Spaces with dense orderable subspaces. Topology and order structures, Part 1 (Lubbock, Tex., 1980), pp. 27–49, Math. Centre Tracts, 142, Math. Centrum, Amsterdam, 1981.
21. Williams, Scott W. "Boxes of compact ordinals". Topology Proc. 2, no. 2(1978), 631–642 .
22. Williams, Scott W. Is $\sp{\omega }(\omega +1)$ paracompact? Topology Proceedings, 1 (1977), 141–146.
23. Williams, Scott W. Paracompactness and products. General Topology and Appl. 6 (1976), no. 2, 117–125. (Reviewer: H. R. Bennett) 54D20 (54F05) [26] 51 #11449
24. Williams, Scott W. A technique for reducing certain covers on certain L.O.T.S. and their products. TOPO 72---general topology and its applications (Proc. Second Pittsburgh Internat. Conf., Pittsburgh, Pa., 1972; dedicated to the memory of Johannes H. De Groot), pp. 586–590. Lecture Notes in Math., Vol. 378, Springer, Berlin, 1974.
25. Fleischman, William; Williams, Scott The $G\sb{\delta }$-topology on compact spaces. Fund. Math. 83 (1974), no. 2, 143–149.
26. Williams, Scott Transfinite cardinal dimension and separability. Portugal. Math. 32 (1973), 139–145. (Reviewer: A. Appert) 54F45 [29] 42 #5224
27. Williams, Scott W. The liberation of the $Q$-gap. Proceedings of the University of Houston Point Set Topology Conference (Houston, Tex., 1971), pp. 179–186. Univ. Houston, Houston, Tex., 1971.
28. Williams, Scott W. Completeness for all. 1970 Proc. Washington State Univ. Conf. on General Topology (Pullman, Wash., 1970) pp. 127–136, Dept. of Math., Washington State Univ., Pullman, Wash.
