= David Lee Hunter =

American mathematician and educator (1933–2021)

David Lee Hunter (September 10, 1933 – June 24, 2021) was an African American mathematician and educator. He received the Distinguished Service Award from the National Council on Black American Affairs (a council of the American Association of Community Colleges) in 1996, and was honored with the Dr. Martin Luther King Jr. Annual Medallion Award by the city of Charlotte, North Carolina, in 2003.

Dr. David Lee Hunter was born in Charlotte, North Carolina, on September 10, 1933, to Ms. Annie Lee Hunter. He lived with his grandmother Mammy Lee Hunter, aunt Irene Jones and cousins in the Cherry (Charlotte neighborhood) where he attended Morgan School from 1st to 8th grade. From there he matriculated to Second Ward High School. After graduating with honors from Second Ward High School in 1951, he attended Johnson C. Smith University the following September where he received a fifty dollar scholarship for two years. Without sufficient financial support, Hunter decided to enlist in the United States Army. After two years in service, he returned to Johnson C. Smith University and graduated with a degree in Mathematics in 1957. His first job offer was at a school in Zebulon, North Carolina but after an opening for a math teacher became available at Carver College he took that instead. While working as general mathematics teacher at Carver College, Dr. Hunter went back to school during the summer breaks to attain his masters in mathematics at Atlanta University (now Clark Atlanta University). After receiving his degree, Dr. Hunter continued to teach at Carver College which had since changed its name to Mecklenburg College. After Mecklenburg College merged with the local industrial college, Dr. Hunter applied for a job with the public school system. However with some encouragement from Bonnie Cone and James Alexander, Dr. Hunter eventually would go on to work in the new local junior college, Central Piedmont Community College teaching mathematics.

Hunter earned a master's degree in mathematics from Clark Atlanta University and a Doctorate in Education from Nova Southeastern University. He was inspired in his mathematical studies by Abdulalim A. Shabazz. Hunter's first teaching job was at Carver College, which was later renamed Mecklenburg College and then merged with another institution to form Central Piedmont Community College. As Vice-Chairman of the Southeastern section of the Mathematical Association of America, he was instrumental in desegregating the activities of the MAA. He later joined the Central Piedmont administration; on his retirement in 1995, he was Dean of Arts and Sciences and Vice President of General Studies.
