= Abdulalim A. Shabazz =

African American mathematician

Abdulalim Abdullah Shabazz
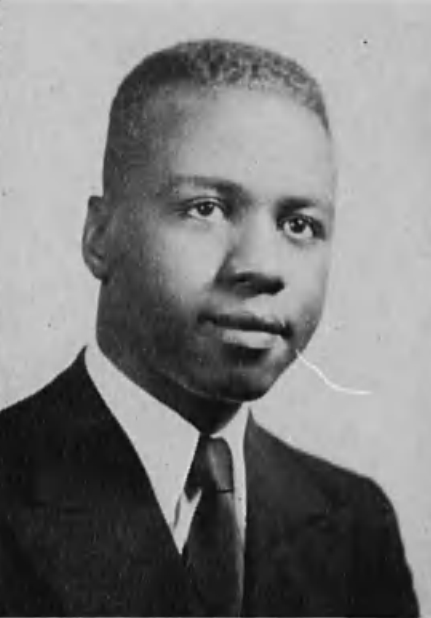
- Abdulalim Shabazz in 1949
- Born: Lonnie Grafton Cross; May 22, 1927; Bessemer, Alabama
- Died: June 25, 2014 (aged 87)
- Other name: Lonnie Shabazz
- Education: Lincoln University, Massachusetts Institute of Technology, Cornell University
- Scientific career
- Fields: Mathematician
- Doctoral advisor: Mark Kac

Abdulalim Abdullah Shabazz (May 22, 1927 – June 25, 2014) was an African American Professor of Mathematics. He received the National Association of Mathematicians Distinguished Service Award for his years of mentoring and teaching excellence. President of the United States Bill Clinton awarded Shabazz a National Mentor award in September 2000.

== Biography ==
Shabazz was born Lonnie Cross in Bessemer, Alabama. In 1949, he earned a Bachelor of Arts in chemistry and mathematics from Lincoln University. Two years later he earned a Master of Science in Mathematics at the Massachusetts Institute of Technology in mathematics and a Doctor of Philosophy in 1955 in mathematical analysis from Cornell University. His subject of his doctoral dissertation was "The Distribution of Eigenvalues of the Equation: Integral of A(S-T) PHI (T) with Respect to T Between Lower Limit -A and Upper Limit A=Rho (Integral of B(S-T))".

Shabazz was appointed an assistant professor of mathematics by Tuskegee Institute in 1956. From 1957 until 1963, he served as chairman and associate professor of mathematics at Clark Atlanta University. One of his students was David Lee Hunter.

Shabazz announced in 1961 that he was a member of the Nation of Islam (later he converted to orthodox Islam).

From 1975 until 1986, Shabazz taught in Chicago, Detroit, and in Mecca, Saudi Arabia. In 1986, Shabazz came back to Clark Atlanta, where he served as chair from 1990 until 1995. From 1998 until 2000, Shabazz was Chairman of the Mathematics and Computer Science Department at Lincoln University (Pennsylvania).

The American Association for the Advancement of Science presented him with its 1992 "Mentor Award" for his leadership in efforts to increase the participation of women, minorities, and individuals with physical disabilities in science and engineering. He received the National Association of Mathematicians Distinguished Service Award for his years of mentoring and teaching excellence. President Clinton awarded Shabazz a Presidential Award for Excellence in Science, Mathematics and Engineering Mentoring award in September 2000. In 2001, the Association of African American Educators awarded Shabazz its Lifetime Achievement Award for outstanding work with African Americans in mathematics. He was a professor and endowed chair in mathematics at Grambling State University.

Abdulalim A. Shabazz died on June 25, 2014, aged 87.

== Selected publications ==
- Richard J. Drachman and A.K. Bhatia and Abdulalim A. Shabazz (Dec 1990). "Two-Photon Transitions in Hydrogen: A Test of Pseudostate Summation". Phys. Rev. A. 42 (11): 6333–6335. Bibcode:1990PhRvA..42.6333D. doi:10.1103/physreva.42.6333. PMID 9903930.
- Abdulalim A. Shabazz (May 1993). "Generalizations of two well-known results on Hermitian forms". In G. S. Ladde (ed.). Proc. 1st Int. Conf. on Dynamic Systems and Applications. Morehouse College, Atlanta/GA. pp. 301–305.
- F. Semwogerere and A. Shabazz and F. Abebe (Mar 2006). Real Analysis — A First Course With An Inductive Approach. Victoria/BC: Trafford Publishing. ISBN 9781412035293.
