= National Association of Mathematicians =

American professional association

- Abbreviation: NAM
- Founded: 1969
- Type: 501(c)(3)
- Purpose: promoting excellence in the mathematical sciences promoting the mathematical development of all underrepresented minorities.
- Board of directors: Omayra Ortega, President; Torina Lewis, Vice-President; Aris Winger, Executive Secretary; Cory Colbert, Treasurer; Shea Burns, Secretary; Zerotti Woods, Editor
- Website: www.nam-math.org

The National Association of Mathematicians is a professional association for mathematicians in the US, especially African Americans and other minorities. It was founded in 1969.

== Lectures ==
NAM hosts five lecture series that honor African American mathematicians.

Two of these take place at the annual Joint Mathematics Meetings of the American Mathematical Society. The Cox-Talbot Lecture, named after Elbert Frank Cox and Walter Richard Talbot, is an hour-long lecture that takes place during the NAM Banquet. Invited speakers are mathematicians chosen for their achievement and service to the mathematical community. The Lecture was inaugurated in 1990, and past speakers have been:

- 2026 Felicia Simpson, Winston-Salem State University, “Bridging the Gap: Strategies for Diverse Representation in Mathematical, Statistical, and Data Sciences”
- 2025 Omayra Ortega, “Who is the Conscience of AI?”
- 2024 Ranthony A. Clark, “Quantitative Justice: Intersections of Mathematics and Society”
- 2023 Nathan Alexander, “Histories of African-Americans connecting mathematics and society”
- 2022 Robert Q. Berry III, “Interest Convergence: An analytical viewpoint for examining how power dictates policies and reforms in mathematics”
- 2021 Talitha Washington, “Leveraging Data Science at HBCUs to Advance Innovation”
- 2020 Roselyn Williams, “Bridging the Gaps in Undergraduate Mathematics Education “
- 2019 Talithia Williams, “A Seat at the Table: Equity and Social Justice in Mathematics Education”
- 2018 Erica Walker, “Hidden in Plain Sight: Mathematics Teaching and Learning Through a Storytelling Lens”
- 2017 Garikai Campbell, “The Changing Higher Education Landscape: One Mathematician Turned Administrator's View”
- 2016 Tanya A. Moore, “Why Mathematicians and Statisticians are Needed to Create Lasting Social Impact”
- 2015 Jacqueline Brannon Giles, “Mathematics: An Imitation of Life”
- 2014 Nathaniel Dean, “Solving Our Human Problems”
- 2013 Genevieve Madeline Knight, “The Rest of the Story”
- 2012 Sylvia T. Bozeman, “Creating Mathematical Scientists Among the Underrepresented”
- 2011 Robert Bozeman , “Increasing the Pool of Underrepresented Mathematicians”
- 2010 Abdulalim Abdullah Shabazz , “The Number Zero: Its Origin and Use”
- 2009 Leon Woodson , “State of a M.A.D. Union”
- 2008 Earl R. Barnes
- 2007 Scott W. Williams , “Why "Mathematicians of the African Diaspora?"”
- 2006 Wade Ellis, Jr. , “Teaching Mathematics in the 21st Century: Anecdotes From the Past and Future”
- 2005 John W. Alexander Jr., “Intrinsically Interesting Mathematical Intrigue (Why I love Mathemat”
- 2004 J. Ernest Wilkins , “Reflections”
- 2003 Raymond L. Johnson , “The Maryland Experience: Building a Community of African American Graduate Students”
- 2002 Gloria Conyers Hewitt , “The Right Train”
- 1999 Johnny L. Houston , “The End of One Era, the Dawn of Another”
- 1998 Nathaniel Pollard, Jr. , “Some 21st Century Challenges and Opportunities for Minorities in Mathematics, Science and Engineering”
- 1997 Charles B. Bell , “Some of My Favorite Mathematicians”
- 1996 Evelyn Boyd Granville, “Some Perspective about Mathematics and Mathematics Education”
- 1995 William Hawkins , “Some Perspectives About Underrepresented American Minorities in Mathematics”
- 1994 Etta Z. Falconer , “Challenges and Opportunities for Minorities in Science and Mathematics”
- 1992 Gloria Gilmer , “Ethomathematics: A natural focus for NAM”
- 1990 Johnny L. Houston , “Some Milestones of the Past, Challenges of the Future”

The Claytor-Woodard Lecture at the JMM was inaugurated in 1980 and is named after Dudley Weldon Woodard and William Waldron Schieffelin Claytor. Each year a speaker is chosen on the basis of their work to improve opportunities in mathematical research for underrepresented American minorities. Past speakers include Ryan Hynd, Monica Jackson, Chelsea Walton, Suzanne Weekes, and Henok Mawi.

The J. Ernest Wilkins Lecture at NAM's Undergraduate MATHFest was inaugurated in 1994. Past lecturers are listed below:

Year	Lecturer
2024	Naiomi Cameron
2023	Talithia Williams
2022	Akil Parker
2021	Pamela Harris
2020	Omayra Ortega
2019	Donald Cole
2018	Michelle Craddock Guinn
2017	Stephon Alexander
2016	Jonathan David Farley
2011	Gaston N'Guerekata
2007	Dawn Lott
2006	Beverly Anderson
2001	Bernard Mair
2000	Scott W. Williams
1999	Richard Tapia
1998	Louis Dale
1997	Johnny L. Houston
1996	Isom Herron
1995	Earl Barnes
1994	J. Earnest Wilkins

The other two lecture series organised by NAM are:

- Albert Turner Bharucha-Reid Lecture at the Regional Faculty Conference on Research and Teaching Excellence
- MAA-NAM David Harold Blackwell Lecture at Mathematical Association of America (MAA) MathFest

== Haynes-Granville-Browne Session ==
The Haynes-Granville-Browne Session of Presentations by Recent Doctoral Recipients is a three-hour session held at the Joint Mathematics meetings. A speaking award is conferred eac year. Past awardees are:

Year	Awardee
2026	Reginald Cyril Wallis Anderson
2024	Felix M, Pabdon Rodriguez
2021	Lori D Watson
2020	Brett Jefferson
2019	Anisah Nu'Man
2019	Alexander Barrios
2018	Kendra Pleasant
2017	Deidra Andrea Coleman
2016	Nakeya Williams
2015	Pamela Harris

== History ==
At the 1969 Joint Mathematics Meetings in New Orleans, seventeen mathematicians met on Sunday January 26 to begin a new organization:

1. James Ashley Donaldson, faculty at University Illinois at Chicago
2. Samuel Horace Douglas, faculty at Grambling College
3. Henry Madison Eldridge, faculty at Fayetteville State College
4. Thyrsa Anne Frazier-Svager, faculty at Central State University
5. Richard Griego, faculty at the University of New Mexico at Albuquerque
6. Johnny Lee Houston, faculty at Stillman College and graduate student at Purdue University
7. Curtis Jefferson, faculty at Cuyahoga Community College
8. Vivienne Malone-Mayes, faculty at Baylor University
9. Theodore Portis, faculty at Alabama State University
10. Charles R. Smith, faculty at Paine College
11. Robert S. Smith, graduate student at Pennsylvania State University
12. Beauregard Stubblefield, faculty at Texas Southern University
13. Henry Thaggert, faculty at Jarvis Christian College
14. Walter Richard Talbot, faculty at Morgan State College
15. Argelia Valez-Rodriquez, faculty at Bishop College
16. Harriet Rose Junior Walton, faculty at & Morehouse College
17. Scott W. Williams, graduate student at Lehigh University
