= Freshfields =

Multinational law firm

Freshfields LLP
- Headquarters: 100 Bishopsgate; London, United Kingdom
- No. of offices: 33
- No. of lawyers: 2,761
- No. of employees: 4,959
- Major practice areas: Banking and finance; Capital markets; Competition/Antitrust; Corporate/M&A; International arbitration; Litigation; Private equity; Projects and energy; Real estate; Tax
- Key people: Georgia Dawson (Senior Partner); Alan Mason (Global Managing Partner); Rick van Aerssen (Global Managing Partner)
- Revenue: ▲£1.472 billion (2018/19)
- Profit per equity partner: ▲£1.839 million (2018/19)
- Date founded: 2000 (by merger)
- Founder: Samuel Dodd and James William Freshfield
- Company type: Limited liability partnership
- Website: freshfields.com

Freshfields LLP (formerly Freshfields Bruckhaus Deringer, or FBD) is a British multinational law firm headquartered in London, England, and a member of the "Magic Circle". The firm has 33 offices in 17 jurisdictions across Asia, Europe, the Middle East and North America. It advises national and multinational corporations, financial institutions and governments.

== History ==
Freshfields was created in 2000 when U.K.-based Freshfields merged with the two law firms, Germany-based Deringer Tessin Herrmann & Sedemund and Germany-and-Austria-based Bruckhaus Westrick Heller Löber.

Dubbed as the oldest firm within the Magic Circle, Freshfields' origins arguably go back to around 1716, when Thomas Woodford began to practise law. Woodford was succeeded in his practice in 1730 by William Wall, who was succeeded in turn in 1743 by Samuel Dodd. That same year, Dodd was appointed attorney to the Bank of England. In 1788, Winter and Kaye began advising Sir Richard Arkwright, inventor of the water frame. When James William Freshfield joined in 1800, Dodd had died and the Freshfield family became the dominant force in the law firm. Dodd's appointment is treated by Freshfields as the firm's foundation date.

The firm changed its name on numerous occasions as different partners joined or left. In 1800, James William Freshfield (1775–1864) was the first member of the Freshfield family to become a partner, and the firm became known as Winter, Kaye, Beckwith & Freshfield. Following further name changes, it became Freshfield & Son in 1825, and eventually Freshfields 1868–76, Freshfields & Williams 1876–98, Freshfields 1899–1918, Freshfields & Leese 1918–1921, Freshfields, Leese & Munns 1921–1945, and Freshfields 1946–2000. The last member of the Freshfield family to be a partner, another James William Freshfield, retired in 1927.

Bruckhaus Westrick Heller Löber traces its origins back to Hamburg in 1840. The firm merged with Freshfields in 2000.

Deringer Tessin Herrmann & Sedemund was founded in 1962 by Arved Deringer and Claus Tessin and was based in Cologne from 1970 to 2000.

In 2019, the firm became the first non-US law firm to raise the salaries of newly qualified junior lawyers in the United Kingdom to £100,000, then £125,000 in 2022 and £150,000 in 2024.

In September 2020, Freshfields announced Georgia Dawson as its new senior partner after time leading the firm's Asia operations. In October 2022, the firm announced the appointment of Jake Reynolds as its head of Client Sustainability and Environment to support energy transition, human rights, corporate governance, climate change and sustainable finance. In 2024, the firm announced that as part of their rebrand, the firm's legal name would be shortened to Freshfields, dropping "Bruckhaus Deringer".

=== Future expansion ===
Georgia Dawson, a Freshfields senior partner, indicated in 2024 that the firm is looking to expand its presence in the United States amid a surge in revenue. Dawson highlighted the state of Texas, as well as Boston, Massachusetts, as potential locations for expansion.

=== Controversies ===
In 2019, the firm faced questioning by the Solicitors Regulation Authority over its review into how UBS dealt with a rape complaint.

Since 2017, German prosecutors have twice raided Freshfields' Frankfurt offices to investigate the phantom-trading fraud, known as cum ex fraud, which the German government estimates cost its treasury more than 5 billion euros. Freshfields gave tax advice, which was used to justify its legality. In November 2019, the firm's former head of international tax, Ulf Johannemann, was arrested and charged with tax fraud. Then in June 2020, a second former partner was charged with aiding and abetting tax evasion in the scandal.

In 2020, the firm was also discovered to have had historic ties to the Atlantic slave trade. In particular, the firm's name founder, James William Freshfield, financially benefited from slavery by acting as a trustee and owner-in-fee for several slave-owners.

== Notable lawyers ==
- Bim Afolami
- Arved Deringer
- Dame Sarah Falk
- Douglas Freshfield
- Henry Ray Freshfield
- Kenneth I. Juster
- John Lamont
- Chris Mort
- Mark Okerstrom
- Jan Paulsson
- John Parkinson
- Benito Romano
- Sir Anthony Salz
- Terry Calvani
- Timothy A. Wilkins
- Sir Nicholas Young
- Alma Zadić

== See also ==
- List of largest law firms by revenue
- List of largest law firms by profits per partner
- Magic Circle (law firms)
