= Walter Richard Talbot =

African American mathematician

Walter Richard Talbot (1909-1977) was the fourth African American to earn a Ph.D. in Mathematics (Geometric Group Theory) from the University of Pittsburgh and Lincoln University's youngest Doctor of Philosophy. He was a member of Sigma Xi and Pi Tau Phi. In 1969 Talbot co-founded the National Association of Mathematics (NAM) at Morgan State University, the organization which, nine years later honored him at a memorial luncheon and created a scholarship in his name. In 1990 the Cox-Talbot lecture was inaugurated recognizing his accomplishments together with Elbert Frank Cox – the first African-American to get a doctoral degree in mathematics.

Academic positions Talbot held include: Mathematics Department Chair and Professor (Morgan State University); assistant professor, professor, department chair, dean of men, registrar, acting dean of instruction (Lincoln University). Talbot was most widely known for his introduction of computer technology to the school.

Talbot's dissertation was entitled Fundamental Regions in S(sub 6) for the Simple Quaternary G(sub 60), Type I.
