= Power in Numbers: The Rebel Women of Mathematics =

Book on women in mathematics

- First edition book cover
- Author: Talithia Williams
- Publisher: Race Point Publishing
- Publication date: May 8, 2018
- ISBN: 978-1-631-06485-2

Power in Numbers: The Rebel Women of Mathematics is a book on women in mathematics, by Talithia Williams. It was published in 2018 by Race Point Publishing.

== Topics and related works ==
This book is a collection of biographies of 27 women mathematicians, and brief sketches of the lives of many others. It is similar to previous works including Osen's Women in Mathematics (1974), Perl's Math Equals (1978), Henrion's Women in Mathematics (1997), Murray's Women Becoming Mathematicians (2000), Complexities: Women in Mathematics (2005), Green and LaDuke's Pioneering Women in American Mathematics (2009), and Swaby's Headstrong (2015).

The book is divided into three sections. The first two cover mathematics before and after World War II, when women's mathematical contributions to codebreaking and other aspects of the war effort became crucial; together they include the biographies of 11 mathematicians. The final section, on modern (post-1965) mathematics, has another 16. Mathematics is interpreted in a broad sense, including people who trained as mathematicians and worked in industry, or who made mathematical contributions in other fields. People from more diverse backgrounds than previous such collections are included, such as 18th-century Chinese astronomer Wang Zhenyi, Native American engineer Mary G. Ross, African-American rocket scientist Annie Easley, Iranian mathematician Maryam Mirzakhani, and Mexican-American mathematician Pamela E. Harris.

== Mathematicians ==
The mathematicians discussed in this book include:

=== Part I: The Pioneers ===
- Marie Crous
- Émilie du Châtelet
- Maria Gaetana Agnesi
- Philippa Fawcett
- Isabel Maddison
- Grace Chisholm Young
- Wang Zhenyi
- Sophie Germain
- Winifred Edgerton Merrill
- Sofya Kovalevskaya
- Emmy Noether
- Euphemia Haynes

=== Part II: From Code Breaking to Rocket Science ===
- Grace Hopper
- Mary G. Ross
- Dorothy Vaughan
- Katherine Johnson
- Mary Jackson
- Shakuntala Devi
- Annie Easley
- Margaret Hamilton

=== Part III: Modern Math Mavens ===
- Sylvia Bozeman
- Eugenia Cheng
- Carla Cotwright-Williams
- Pamela E. Harris
- Maryam Mirzakhani
- Ami Radunskaya
- Daina Taimiņa
- Tatiana Toro
- Chelsea Walton
- Sara Zahedi

== Audience and reception ==
The book is aimed at a young audience, with many images and few mathematical details. Nevertheless, each biography is accompanied by a general-audience introduction to the subject's mathematical work, and beyond images of the women profiled, the book includes many mathematical illustrations and historical images that bring to life these contributions. Reviewer Emille Davie Lawrence suggests that the book could also find its way to the coffee tables of professional mathematicians, and spark conversations with guests.

Reviewer Amy Ackerberg-Hastings criticizes the book for overlooking much scholarly work on the subject of women in mathematics, for its lack of detail for some notable women including Émilie du Châtelet and Maria Gaetana Agnesi, and for omitting others such as Mary Somerville. Nevertheless, she recommends it as a "gift book for middle schoolers", as a way of motivating them to work in STEM fields.

Reviewer Allan Stenger notes with approval the book's inclusion of information about how each subject became interested in mathematics, and despite catching some minor errors calls it "a good bet for inspiring bright young women to have an interest in math". Similarly, reviewer Angela Mihai writes that it "will educate and encourage many aspiring mathematicians".
