= Christine Ladd-Franklin =

American psychologist and logician (1847 - 1930)

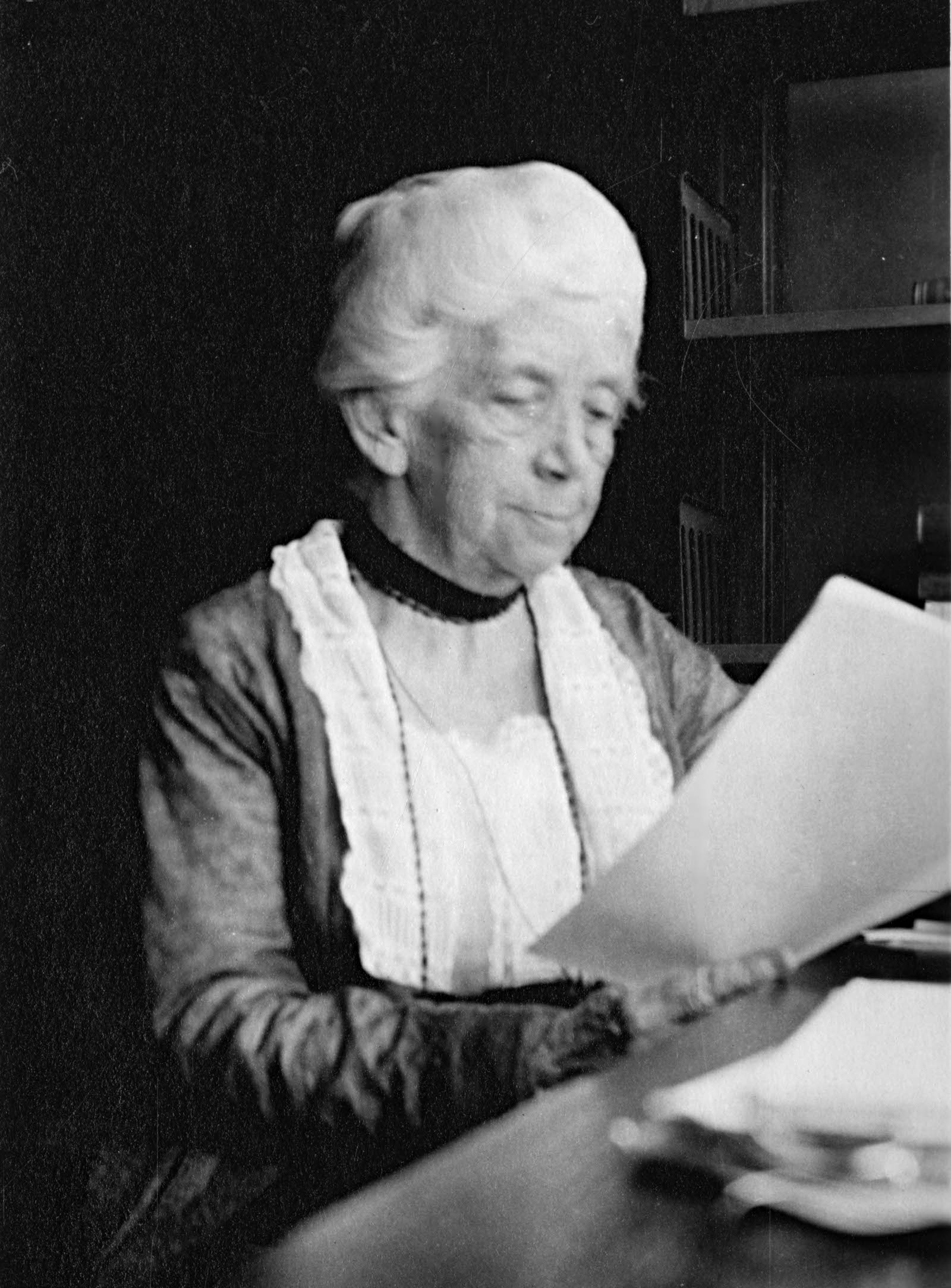
- Born: Christine Ladd; December 1, 1847; Windsor, Connecticut, U.S.
- Died: March 5, 1930 (aged 82); New York City, U.S.
- Spouse: Fabian Franklin (m. 1882)
- Children: 2
- Scientific career
- Fields: Logic, psychology

Christine Ladd-Franklin (December 1, 1847 – March 5, 1930) was an American psychologist, logician, and mathematician.

== Early life and education ==
Christine Ladd, sometimes known by the nickname "Kitty", was born on December 1, 1847, in Windsor, Connecticut, to Eliphalet, a merchant, and Augusta (née Niles) Ladd. During her early childhood, she lived with her parents and younger brother Henry (born 1850) in New York City. In 1853 the family moved back to Windsor, Connecticut, where her sister Jane Augusta Ladd McCordia was born the following year. Family correspondence shows that Augusta and one of her sisters were both staunch supporters of women's rights. Before Ladd turned five, her mother had taken her to a lecture given by Elizabeth Oakes Smith, a well-known proponent of women's rights. Additionally, her father was a graduate professor who was supportive of his eldest daughter's education.

Following the death of her mother in spring 1860 of pneumonia, Ladd went to live with her paternal grandmother in Portsmouth, New Hampshire, where she attended school. Ladd's father remarried in 1862 and had two further children, her half-sister Katherine (born 1862) and half-brother George (born 1867). Ladd was reportedly a precocious child who sought to find "a mean to continue her education beyond secondary school." Her father enrolled her in a two-year program at the coeducational Wesleyan Academy in Wilbraham, Massachusetts. At Wesleyan Academy she took the same courses her male classmates took to prepare for entrance to colleges such as Harvard.

In 1865, Ladd graduated from Wesleyan Academy and pursued further education at Vassar College, supported by her family.

In the fall of 1866, Ladd enrolled in Vassar College, financed by a loan from her aunt Juliet Niles, but left at the end of the spring term due to financial hardship. Ladd then worked as a public school teacher until her aunt's aid allowed her to re-enroll in Vassar. She earned an A.B. degree in 1869. While attending Vassar, Ladd began working under the mentorship of an astronomy professor, Maria Mitchell, who was famous for having been "the first woman to discover a new comet, using a telescope, in 1847". Mitchell was also a suffragette and strove to inspire women to gain more self-confidence to enter into the male-dominated academia of the time. Under the guidance of Mitchell, Ladd became proficient and developed a love for physics and mathematics. Because women in nineteenth-century America were prohibited from working in physics laboratories, Ladd chose to study mathematics. Later in life, Ladd would reflect on her decision, saying, "had it not been for the impossibility, in those days, in the case of women, of obtaining access to laboratory facilities," she would have studied physics.

In 1887, Vassar College awarded Ladd an honorary LL.D.

== Early career ==
After graduating from Vassar, Ladd taught science and mathematics at secondary level in Washington, Pennsylvania; Hollidaysburg, Pennsylvania; Massachusetts; and New York for nine years, although her diary entries indicate that her interest in teaching may have diminished over time. During this time, Ladd contributed seventy-seven mathematical problems and solutions to the Educational Times of London. She also published six items in The Analyst: A Journal of Pure and Applied Mathematics and three in the American Journal of Mathematics.

== Graduate education ==
In 1878, Ladd was accepted into Johns Hopkins University with the help of James J. Sylvester, an English mathematician among the university's faculty who remembered some of Ladd's earlier works in the Educational Times. Ladd's application for a fellowship was signed "C. Ladd", and the university offered her the position without realizing she was a woman. When they did realize her gender, the board tried to revoke the offer, but Sylvester insisted that Ladd should be his student, and so she was. She held a fellowship at Johns Hopkins University for three years, but the trustees did not allow her name to be printed in circulars with those of other fellows, for fear of setting a precedent. Furthermore, dissension over her continued presence forced one of the original trustees to resign.

Since the university did not approve of coeducation, at first Ladd was only allowed to attend classes taught by Sylvester. However, after displaying exceptional work in his courses, Ladd was allowed to take courses with additional professors. Even though she was awarded a stipend, she was not allowed to have the title of "fellow". During 1879 and 1880, Ladd took classes taught by Charles Sanders Peirce, who has been called the first American experimental psychologist. She wrote a dissertation "On the Algebra of Logic" with Peirce as her thesis advisor. The dissertation was published in Studies in Logic (C.S. Peirce, ed.) in 1883. In 1884, Ladd attended William Thomson, 1st Baron Kelvin's master class and met her future husband, Fabian Franklin.

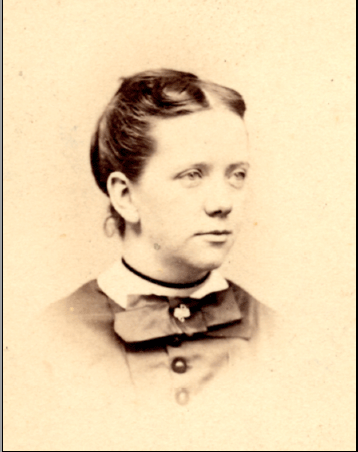
Christine Ladd-Franklin

Due to her studies with Sylvester and Peirce, Ladd became the first American woman to formally receive graduate instruction in both mathematics and symbolic logic. Since women were not allowed to graduate from Johns Hopkins University at that time, Ladd was refused a PhD in mathematics and logic, although she was the first woman to complete all the university's requirements for a PhD. Completing the work for a PhD in mathematics and logic at Johns Hopkins University gave her the tools and the legitimacy she needed, as a woman taking up scientific work. The university eventually officially awarded her a PhD during its 50th-anniversary celebrations in 1926 (44 years after she had earned it) when she was seventy-eight.

In 1893, she applied for a teaching position at Johns Hopkins University, but was denied. Laurel Furumoto, in her work discussing the sociopolitical environment of the time, notes that Ladd's "inability to secure a regular academic position was a predictable consequence, in that time period, of her decision to marry." Eleven years later, in 1904, she was at last given permission to teach one class per year. For the next five years her position at Johns Hopkins University had to be approved and renewed on a yearly basis. Women who were able to obtain academic positions in universities at this time often chose these positions despite their lack of compensation. Ladd was no different. Many of the teaching positions that she held were on a volunteer basis, creating substantial financial strain on her and her family. Yet, it is evident that Ladd placed a high value on her ability to earn the academic affiliations necessary to become a successful contributor to her field.

== Personal life and philosophy ==
After marriage to Fabian Franklin on August 24, 1882, she adopted the name Christine Ladd-Franklin. The couple had two children, one of whom died in infancy. The other, Margaret Ladd-Franklin, became a prominent member in the women's suffrage movement. Ladd-Franklin often wrote of the injustice she observed in the oppression of the female sex. In one such journal entry while at Vassar College she describes her disappointment with the views in society about and among women, stating, "I so despise the idea that women are not as competent to take care of themselves as men, that they cannot decide for themselves when to go to bed and when to get up, how much exercise to take, how much to pray and go to church. Still my greatest objection is to the class of girls who come here and to the social and political atmosphere of the place...I know of but one girl who declares herself for the rights of women" (September 22, 1866). In another journal entry she writes about the lack of recognition of women who have earned advanced educational degrees, "That is the case with our clever girls -- they go to Germany and get the parchments, beautifully signed and sealed, that proclaim them to be doctors of philosophy, but no further consequences follow. They have nothing but the empty satisfaction of exhibiting their 'tickets'".

She wrote a letter to the New York Times advocating that citizens of the United States call themselves "Usonians."

She died of pneumonia on March 5, 1930, in New York, New York.

== Major contributions and achievements ==
After leaving Hopkins, Ladd-Franklin worked with German psychologist G. E. Müller, where she carried out experimental work on vision. Although women in academic settings and laboratories were viewed as equally unwelcome as in the United States, she managed to secure a position. Ladd-Franklin was also able to work in the laboratory of Hermann von Helmholtz, where she attended his lectures on theory of color vision. After attending these lectures, Ladd-Franklin developed her own theory of color vision. In 1929 she published Color and Color Theories.

=== Ladd-Franklin's theory of color vision ===
One of the major contributions that Ladd-Franklin made to psychology was her theory of color vision, which was based on evolution. Ladd-Franklin noted that: "some animals are color blind and assumed that achromatic vision appeared first in evolution and color vision came later." She assumed further that the human eye carries fragments of its earlier evolutionary development. She observed that the most highly evolved part of the eye is the fovea, where, at least in daylight, visual acuity and color sensitivity are greatest. Ladd-Franklin assumed that peripheral vision (provided by the rods of the retina) was more primitive than foveal vision (provided by the cones of the retina) because night vision and movement detection are crucial for survival."

=== Stages of color vision ===
Ladd-Franklin concluded that color vision evolved in three stages: achromatic vision (black and white), blue–yellow sensitivity and red–green sensitivity. Since red–green sensitivity was the last to evolve, it explains why many people suffer from red-green color blindness. The next one that affects a small population is blue–yellow color blindness. Since achromatic vision was the first to evolve, it explains why the majority of the population are not affected by black–white color blindness.

=== Mathematics and logic ===
Ladd-Franklin was the first woman to have a published paper in the Analyst. She was also the first woman to receive a PhD in mathematics and logic. The majority of her publications were based on visual processes and logic. Her views on logic influenced Charles S. Peirce's logic, and she was highly praised by Arthur Prior.

=== Professional involvement ===
Ladd-Franklin was among the first women to join the American Psychological Association in December 1893. From 1894 to 1925, Ladd-Franklin presented ten papers at APA meetings. She was also the first woman member of Optica (formerly the Optical Society of America) in 1919, member number 118. During their meetings, she presented six papers and two exhibits. In 1959, Ladd-Franklin also joined Charlotte Moore Sitterly, Dorothy Nickerson, Gertrude Rand, Louise L Sloan, and Mary E Warga as the five women part of the first Optica Fellow class.

Ladd-Franklin was included in the Who's Who in America during 1901–1902 and 1914–1915. Ladd-Franklin remained a member of both scientific societies until her death. She was also a prominent member of the women's rights movement.

In 1948, Bertrand Russell wrote: "I once received a letter from an eminent logician, Mrs. Christine Ladd-Franklin, saying that she was a solipsist, and was surprised that there were no others. Coming from a logician and a solipsist, her surprise surprised me."

A limerick for Dr Christine Ladd-Franklin, 'The Lonely Solipsist', by William Grey.

Dr Christine remarked, "It is queer,
When the solipsist truth is so clear,

I'm alone in my view
That the theory is true

Since there's no other solipsist here!"

== Published works ==
- "Quaternions", The Analyst v. 4, n. 6, pp. 172–4 (Nov 1877). Google Books The Analyst p. 172 in n. 6 (November) in v. 4 (1877). Also JSTOR "Quaternions" first page. (Several journals have been called "The Analyst". See The Analyst (disambiguation). Internet searches for The Analyst, the one which became The Annals of Mathematics, should use the search phrase "The Analyst" mathematics, otherwise The Analyst about chemistry will dominate search results.)
- "On the Algebra of Logic" in Studies in Logic, C. S. Peirce, ed., pp. 17–71, 1883. Google Books Eprint. Internet Archive Eprint.
- "A Method for the Experimental Determination of the Horopter" in the American Journal of Psychology, v. 1, n. 1 pp. 99–111, November 1887. JSTOR .
- "On Some Characteristics of Symbolic Logic" in the American Journal of Psychology, v. 2, n. 4, pp. 543–567, August 1889. Google Books Eprint. Internet Archive Eprint.
- "Epistemology for the logician" in Verhandlungen des III. Internationalen Kongresses fur Philosophie., pp. 64–670, 1908. Also separately as an offprint.
- "Charles Peirce at the Johns Hopkins", The Journal of Philosophy, Psychology, and Scientific Methods v. 13, n. 26, 715–723, December 1916. Google Books Eprint (badly done) and seek the text.
- "The Reddish Blue Arcs and the Reddish Blue Glow of the Retina; an Emanation from Stimulated Nerve Fibre." in VIIIth International Congress of Psychology: Proceedings and Papers, 1926.
- Colour and Colour Theories, Routledge, 320 pages, 1929.

== See also ==
- Timeline of women in science

== Sources ==
- Furumoto, Laurel (1992). "Joining Separate Spheres: Christine Ladd-Franklin, Woman-Scientist (1847–1930)". American Psychologist. 47 (2): 175–182. doi:10.1037/0003-066x.47.2.175.
- Furumoto, L (December 1994). "Christine Ladd-Franklin's color theory: strategy for claiming scientific authority?". Ann. N. Y. Acad. Sci. 727 (1 Aspects of th). UNITED STATES: 91–100. Bibcode:1994NYASA.727...91F. doi:10.1111/j.1749-6632.1994.tb27502.x. PMID 7857009. S2CID 39782612.
- Hurvich, Dorothea Jameson (1975), "Ladd-Franklin, Christine" Notable American Women, Vol. 2, 4th ed., The Belknap Press of Harvard University Press.
- Nubiola, Jaime and Cobo, Jesús (2000), "The Spanish Mathematician Ventura Reyes Prósper and His Connections with Charles S. Peirce and Christine Ladd-Franklin", Arisbe, Lubbock, TX. Eprint. Includes an English translation "Christine Ladd Franklin: American Mathematician and her influence on symbolic logic" of the paper "Cristina Ladd Franklin. Matemática americana y su influencia en la lógica simbólica" by Prósper published in El Progreso Matemático, 12 (1891), 297–300.
- Spillman, Scott, "Institutional Limits: Christine Ladd-Franklin, Fellowships, and American Women's Academic Careers, 1880–1920," History of Education Quarterly 52 (May 2012), 196–221.
- Notable Women in Mathematics, a Biographical Dictionary, edited by Charlene Morrow and Teri Perl, Greenwood Press, 1998. pp 107–113
- Green, Judy; LaDuke, Jeanne (2008). Pioneering Women in American Mathematics — The Pre-1940 PhD's. History of Mathematics. Vol. 34 (1st ed.). American Mathematical Society, The London Mathematical Society. ISBN 978-0-8218-4376-5.
- Green, Judy; Laduke, Jeanne, Supplementary Material For Pioneering Women In American Mathematics: The Pre-1940 PhD's (PDF), pp. 338–346
