= Mildred Sanderson =

American mathematician

Mildred Leonora Sanderson
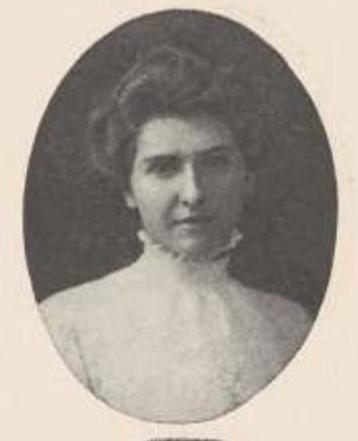
- Born: May 12, 1889; Waltham, Massachusetts, U.S.
- Died: October 15, 1914 (aged 25); East Bridgewater, Massachusetts, U.S.
- Resting place: Mount Feake Cemetery, Waltham
- Scientific career
- Fields: Mathematics
- Thesis: Formal modular invariants with application to binary modular covariants (1913)
- Doctoral advisor: Leonard Eugene Dickson

Mildred Leonora Sanderson (May 12, 1889 – October 10, 1914) was an American mathematician, best known for her mathematical theorem concerning modular invariants.

== Life ==
Sanderson was born in Waltham, Massachusetts, in 1889 and was the valedictorian of her class at the Waltham High School. She graduated from Mount Holyoke College in 1910, winning Senior Honors in Mathematics. She obtained her Ph.D. degree from the University of Chicago in 1913, publishing the thesis (Sanderson 1913) in which she set forth her mathematical theorem. She was Leonard Eugene Dickson's first female doctoral student.

After completing her Ph.D., Sanderson briefly taught at the University of Wisconsin before her untimely death in 1914 due to tuberculosis.

== Sanderson's theorem ==
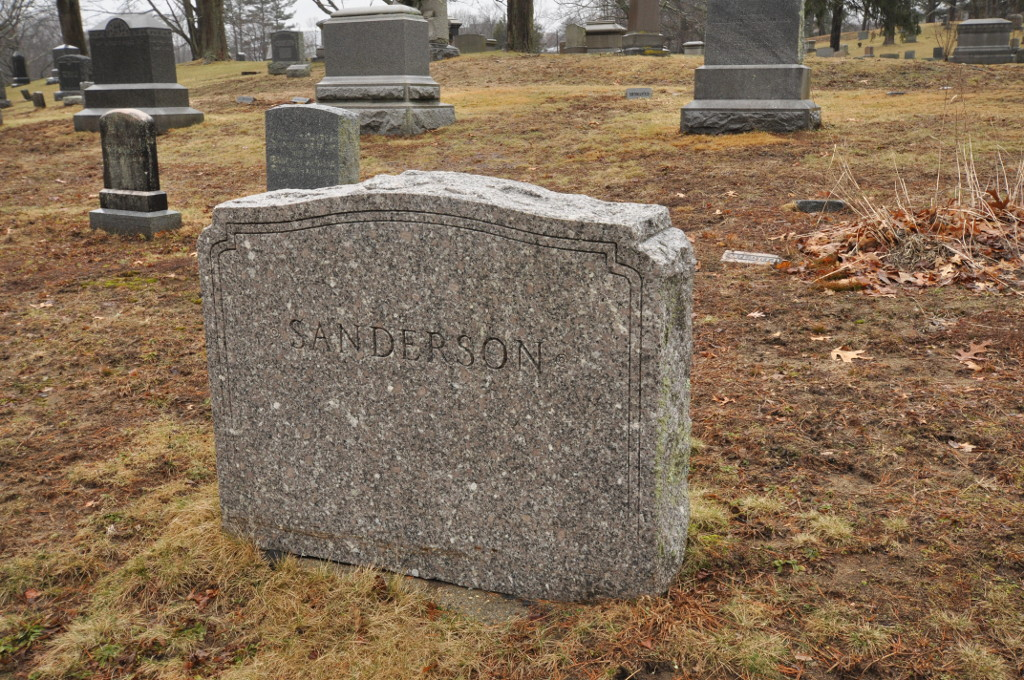
Sanderson family grave at Mount Feake Cemetery, Waltham, Massachusetts. The grave of Mildred Sanderson is behind the main marker.

Sanderson's theorem (Sanderson 1913, p.490) states: "To any modular invariant $i$ of a system of forms under any group $G$ of linear transformations with coefficients in the field ${\rm GF}[p^n]$, there corresponds a formal invariant $I$ under $G$ such that $I=i$ for all sets of values in the field of the coefficients of the system of forms." Often this theorem was cited as “Miss Sanderson’s Theorem”.

== Recognition ==
She is mentioned in the 2008 book Pioneering women in American mathematics: the pre-1940 PhD's, by Judy Green and Jeanne LaDuke.
