= Nazareth Convent and Academy =

- U.S. National Register of Historic Places
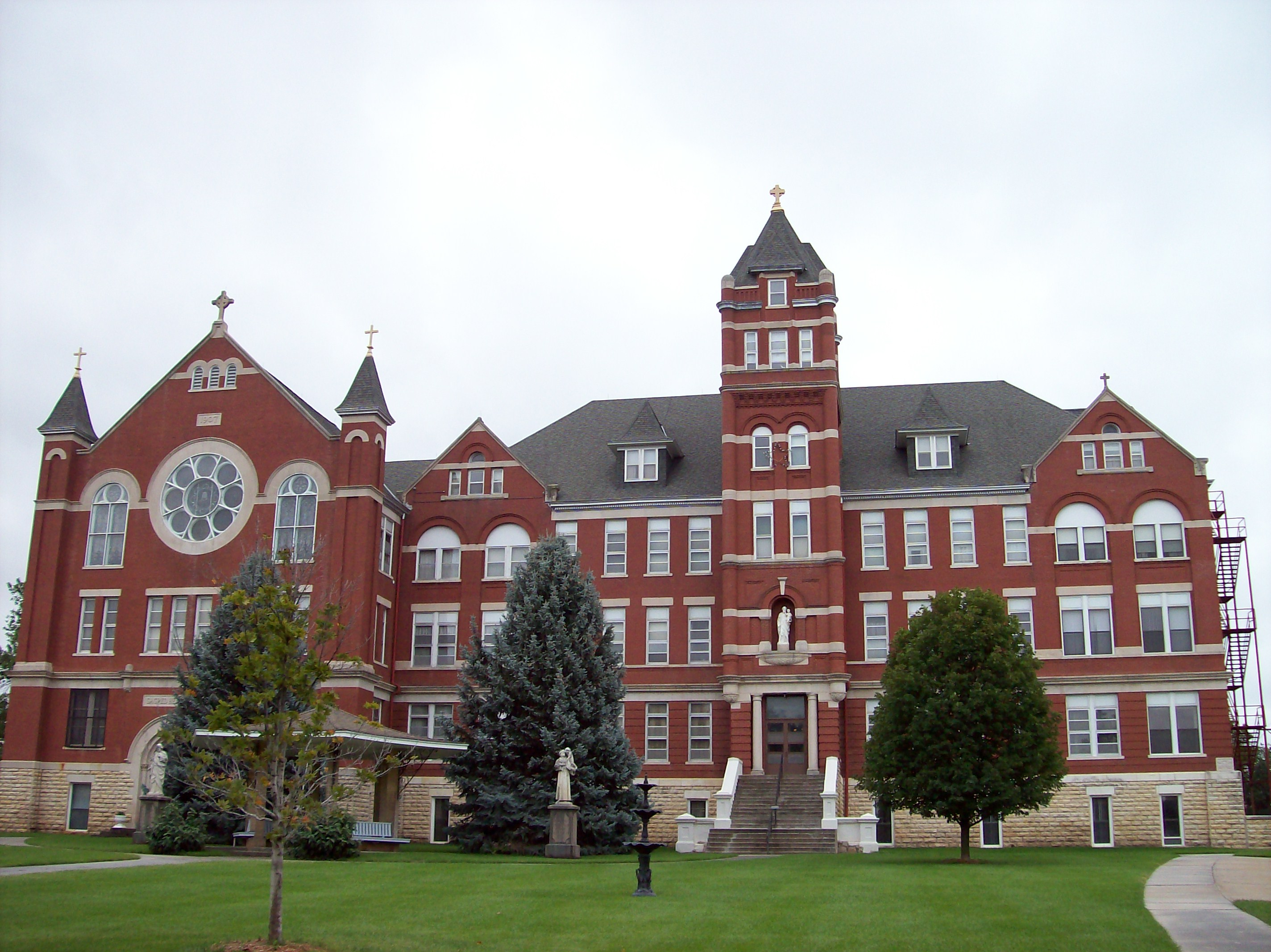
- Nazareth Convent and Academy, 2007
- Location: 13th and Washington Sts. Concordia, Kansas
- Coordinates: 39°33′49.25″N 97°39′37.75″W
- Built: 1898
- Architect: William P. Feth and Wilson W. Hunt
- Architectural style: Romanesque
- NRHP reference No.: 73000748
- Added to NRHP: January 18, 1973

The Nazareth Convent and Academy in Concordia, Kansas is the official Motherhouse and Home for the 160 Sisters of St. Joseph of Concordia. It was built in 1903 and is listed in the National Register of Historic Places. The beautiful Lourdes-Park, restored in 1990, offers a place for walking and enjoying nature and the large stained glass window is known as "the beacon light of Concordia" as it looks over the community from the convent.

== Early years ==
Laying the cornerstone at the Nazareth Convent and Academy, May 15, 1902

In 1884, the Rev. Joseph Perrier invited the Sisters of St. Joseph to come to Concordia to open a school in the Catholic Parish. Mother Stanislaus Leary, superior, and five sisters answered the invitation. They came to Concordia and established the Nazareth Motherhouse and Academy in a new building located next to the church.

The cornerstone ceremony was held on May 15, 1902. The main building was completed in late June 1903 and a section known as the Music Hall was added in 1906. 1908 saw the edition of a Chapel wing to the east end of the building.

=== St. Joseph's Hospital ===
The year 1903 brought the St. Joseph's Hospital. The order founded the hospital in the building which had been used for the academy after it had been moved to its location in the newly built Mother House. The hospital would change locations again in 1950 to a new building.

The sisters added a school of nursing in 1919 and continued in Concordia until Marymount College in Salina (another project of the Sisters of St. Joseph) introduced a complete nursing school in 1964.

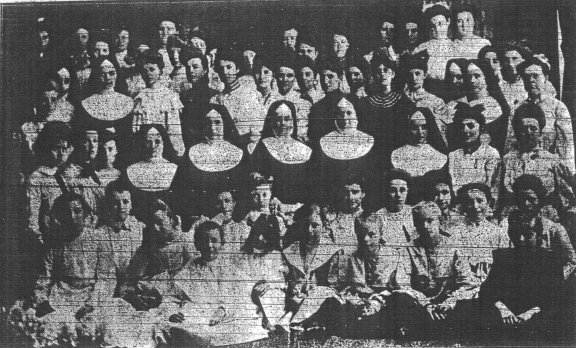

=== Education ===
The sisters quickly gained a fine reputation for the education of young women at Nazareth, giving them a sound academic program as well as instruction in the fine arts, music, French and the social graces. In 1903, the Sisters of St. Joseph entered the health care field in Concordia with the establishment of the St. Joseph Hospital on the original site after the new Nazareth Motherhouse was built at its present location.

== Notable people ==
- Mary Nicholas Arnoldy, sister and mathematician

== Present day ==
The Sisters of St. Joseph remain active to this day.

"As the needs of the late 20th century have changed, so have the ministries of the Sisters of St. Joseph. Today, the Sisters of St. Joseph of Concordia are drawn to missions of mercy, social justice and human rights, working for change in the world wherever cries for love, help and mercy may beckon."

== See also ==
- National Register of Historic Places listings in Cloud County, Kansas
