= Master class =

Lesson taught by expert in field

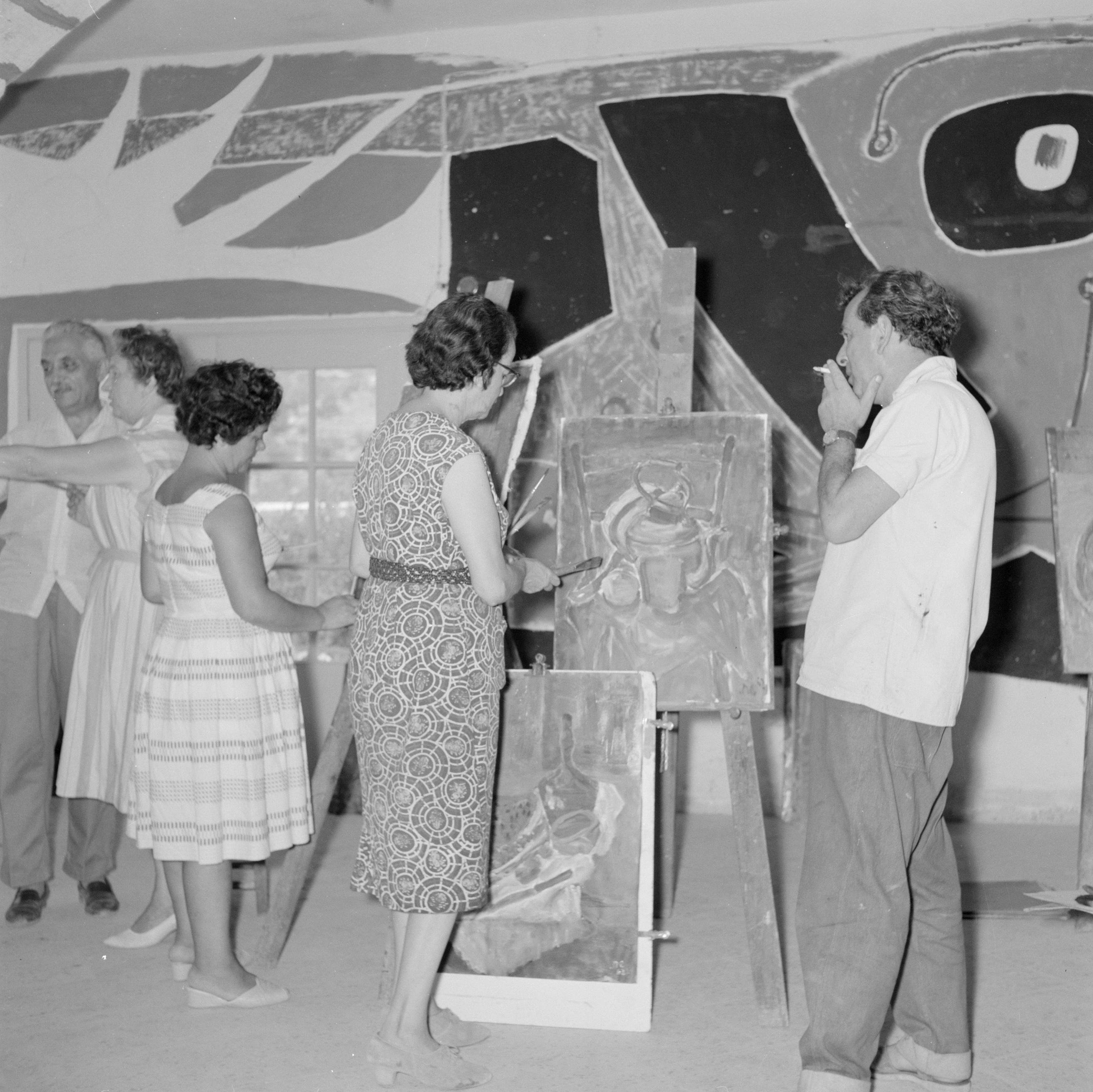
A master class by Romanian-born painter Marcel Janco (far left) in Ein Hod, Israel, 1964

A master class is a class given to students of a particular discipline by an expert of that discipline—usually music, but also science, painting, drama, games, or on any other occasion where skills are being developed.

"Masterclass" is also used in a figurative sense to describe a display of great skill in a context where education was not the primary intention; e.g., "his last few laps were a masterclass in overtaking" (referencing a race around a track).

== Around music ==
The difference between a normal class and a master class is typically the setup. In a master class, all the students (and often spectators) watch and listen as the master takes one student at a time. The student (typically intermediate or advanced, depending on the status of the master) usually performs a single piece which they have prepared, and the master will give them advice on how to play it, often including anecdotes about the composer, demonstrations of how to play certain passages, and admonitions of common technical errors. The student is then usually expected to play the piece again, in light of the master's comments, and the student may be asked to play a passage repeatedly to attain perfection. Master classes for musical instruments tend to focus on the finer details of attack, tone, phrasing, and overall shape, and the student is expected to have complete control of more basic elements such as rhythm and pitch. The value of the master class setup is that all students can benefit from the master's comments on each piece.

Many concert performers have given master classes, starting with its inventor Franz Liszt and including such greats as Yehudi Menuhin, Isaac Stern, Itzhak Perlman, and Vladimir Horowitz. Often, a touring performer will give a master class the day before, or the day of, their performance in a particular city. Giving a master class before a concert provides both artistic stimulation for the performer and a means of obtaining a larger audience.

Aspiring classical musicians, and their teachers, typically consider master classes to be one of the most effective means of musical development, along with competitions, examinations, and practice.

Some musical theatre composers will also give master classes to college students studying performance.

Some speciality classes may be referred to as 'mini master classes'. These can involve short, faster lessons on a new subject. Students, typically experienced in one discipline, may attend these classes to learn the basics of a new, related discipline.

== History ==
In 1884, William Thomson, 1st Baron Kelvin, delivered twenty lectures on molecular dynamics and the wave theory of light. In their 1987 book Kelvin's Baltimore Lectures and Modern Theoretical Physics: historical and philosophical perspectives, Robert Kargon and Peter Achinstein write that the sessions, which were held in a small lecture hall, were conducted as "master classes". The tone was conversational and informal; Kelvin made almost no use of notes ... Usually Kelvin lectured from one of these standpoints, then engaged the audience in a discussion of the details, then shifted to another of the standpoints for the second part of the lecture. They explain:

The attendees were expected to have advanced knowledge of physics and mathematics. Among them were British physicists Lord Rayleigh and George Forbes; Professors Kikuchi and Fujioka of Japan; American instructors in physics from eastern and western colleges, including Albert Michelson and Edward Morley; attendees from Canada, Germany, and Russia; and Hopkins faculty and students including Rowland, Thomas Craig, Fabian Franklin, Henry Crew, Gustav Liebig, Joseph Sweetman Ames, and Christine Ladd Franklin.

A record of the twenty classes was made by A. S. Hathaway and circulated afterwards using papyrograph stencil duplication. It is these notes that were reproduced in 1987 for the publication sponsored by Johns Hopkins Center for the History and Philosophy of Science. In fact Hathaway continued to correspond with Kelvin, who supplemented the notes, and the "Lectures" were eventually broadly circulated in 1904.

== See also ==
- Clinic (music)
- Philharmonisches Kammerorchester Berlin (holds master classes in conducting)
