= Zingarelli (surname) =

Zingarelli is an Italian surname. Notable people with the surname include:

- David E. Zitarelli (1941–2018), American mathematician and historian of mathematics
- Italo Zingarelli (1930–2000), Italian film producer
- Nicola Zingarelli (1860–1935), Italian lexicographer
- Niccolò Antonio Zingarelli (1752–1837), Italian composer
