= Aubrey E. Landry =

Canadian-American mathematician (1880–1972)

Aubrey Edward Landry
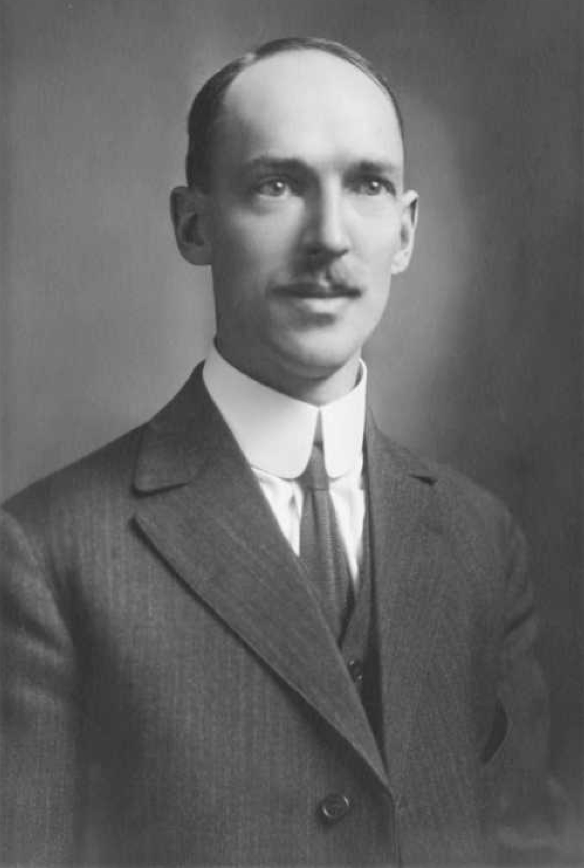
- Born: November 24, 1880; Memramcook, Westmorland, New Brunswick, Canada
- Died: May 3, 1972 (aged 91); Bethesda, Maryland, USA
- Citizenship: United States (naturalized October 6, 1913)

Aubrey Edward Landry (1880–1972) was a Canadian-American mathematician. He was the dissertation director of many of the earliest women to earn doctorates in mathematics in the United States, including the first African American woman to do so, Euphemia Haynes.

== Early life and education ==
He was born in Westmorland, New Brunswick, to Elizabeth R. "Eliza" McSweeney Landry and Tilman T. Landry, and was the oldest of nine children. He received an AB degree (bachelor's) from Harvard University in 1900 and a PhD from Johns Hopkins University in 1907 with the dissertation: "A Geometrical Application of Binary Syzygies" under Frank Morley.

== Career and mentorship of women ==
Landry's dissertation director was Frank Morley, himself also a frequent advisor to women doctoral candidates (see inset quote below). Landry spent his career at Catholic University of America, where he began as a teaching fellow following his graduation from Harvard. He joined the permanent faculty in 1902 after receiving his doctorate at Johns Hopkins. He served as mathematics department chairman for 45 years and directed 28 dissertations until his retirement in 1952, out of which 18 went to women. Lenore Blum wrote,

Of 229 pre-1940 [women] Ph.D.s in mathematics, more than a third were advised by eight mathematicians: Charlotte Angas Scott and Anna Pell Wheeler (at Bryn Mawr), and six men—Frank Morley (at Johns Hopkins) and A. B. Coble (at Johns Hopkins and Illinois), Aubrey Landry (at Catholic University), Virgil Snyder (at Cornell), and Gilbert Ames Bliss and L. E. Dickson (both at Chicago, where together they advised 30 women Ph.D.s). It is not hard to surmise that each of these men felt secure in his position in mathematics... all but one were at one time president of the American Mathematical Society!

All but two of these women were Roman Catholic sisters, a historical phenomenon nationwide because Catholic men's universities were sometimes open by special arrangement to nuns.

== Notable women mentored ==
This list is incomplete, as Landry directed the dissertations of at least 18 women. Some of these come from the Mathematics Genealogy Project, and others from Pioneering Women in American Mathematics. Except for Euphemia Haynes, all of these are Catholic sisters:

1. Mary Nicholas Arnoldy, Ph.D. 1937, Dissertation: "The Reality of the Double Tangents of the Rational Symmetric Quartic Curve."
2. Leonarda Burke, Ph.D. 1931, Dissertation: "On a case of the triangles in-and-circumscribed to a rational quartic curve with a line of symmetry."
3. Mary Charlotte Fowler, Ph.D. 1937, Dissertation: "The discriminant of the sextic of double point parameters of the plane rational quartic curve."
4. Catherine Francis Galvin, Ph.D. 1938, Dissertation: "Two Geometrical Representations of the Symmetric Correspondence C(N,N) with Their Interrelations."
5. Mary de Lellis Gough, Ph.D. 1931, first known Irish woman to earn a doctorate in mathematics. Dissertation: "On the Condition for the Existence of Triangles In-and-Circumscribed to Certain Types of Rational Quartic Curve and Having a Common Side."
6. Euphemia Haynes, Ph.D. 1943, Dissertation: "Determination of Sets of Independent Conditions Characterizing Certain Special Cases of Symmetric Correspondences."
7. Mary Laetitia Hill, Ph.D. 1935, Dissertation: "The Number and Reality of Quadrilaterals In-and-Circumscribed to a Rational Unicuspidal Quartic with Real Tangents from the Cusp."
8. Mary Gervase Kelley, Ph.D. 1917, Dissertation: "On the Cardioids Fulfilling Certain Assigned Conditions."
9. Marie Cecilia Mangold, Ph.D. 1929, Dissertation: "The Loci Described by the Vertices of Singly Infinite Systems of Triangles Circumscribed about a Fixed Conic."
10. Charles Mary Morrison, Ph.D. 1931, Dissertation: "The Triangles In-and-Circumscribed to the Biflecnodal Rational Quartic."
11. M. Henrietta Reilly, Ph.D. 1936, Dissertation: "Self-Symmetric Quadrilaterals In-and-Circumscribed to the Plane Rational Quartic Curve with a Line of Symmetry."
12. M. Helen Sullivan, Ph.D. 1934, Dissertation: "The Number and Reality of the Non-Self-Symmetric Quadrilaterals In-and-Circumscribed to the Rational Unicuspidal Quartic with a Line of Symmetry."
13. Mary Domitilla Thuener, Ph.D. 1932, Dissertation: "On the Number and Reality of the Self-Symmetric Quadrilaterals In-and-Circumscribed to the Triangular-Symmetric Rational Quartic."
14. Mary Felice Vaudreuil, Ph.D. 1931, Dissertation: "Two Correspondences Determined by the Tangents to a Rational Cuspidal Quartic with a Line of Symmetry."

== Selected publications ==
- A geometrical application of binary syzygies by AE Landry, American Mathematical Society, Jan 10, 1909.
