= Cloud County Health Center =

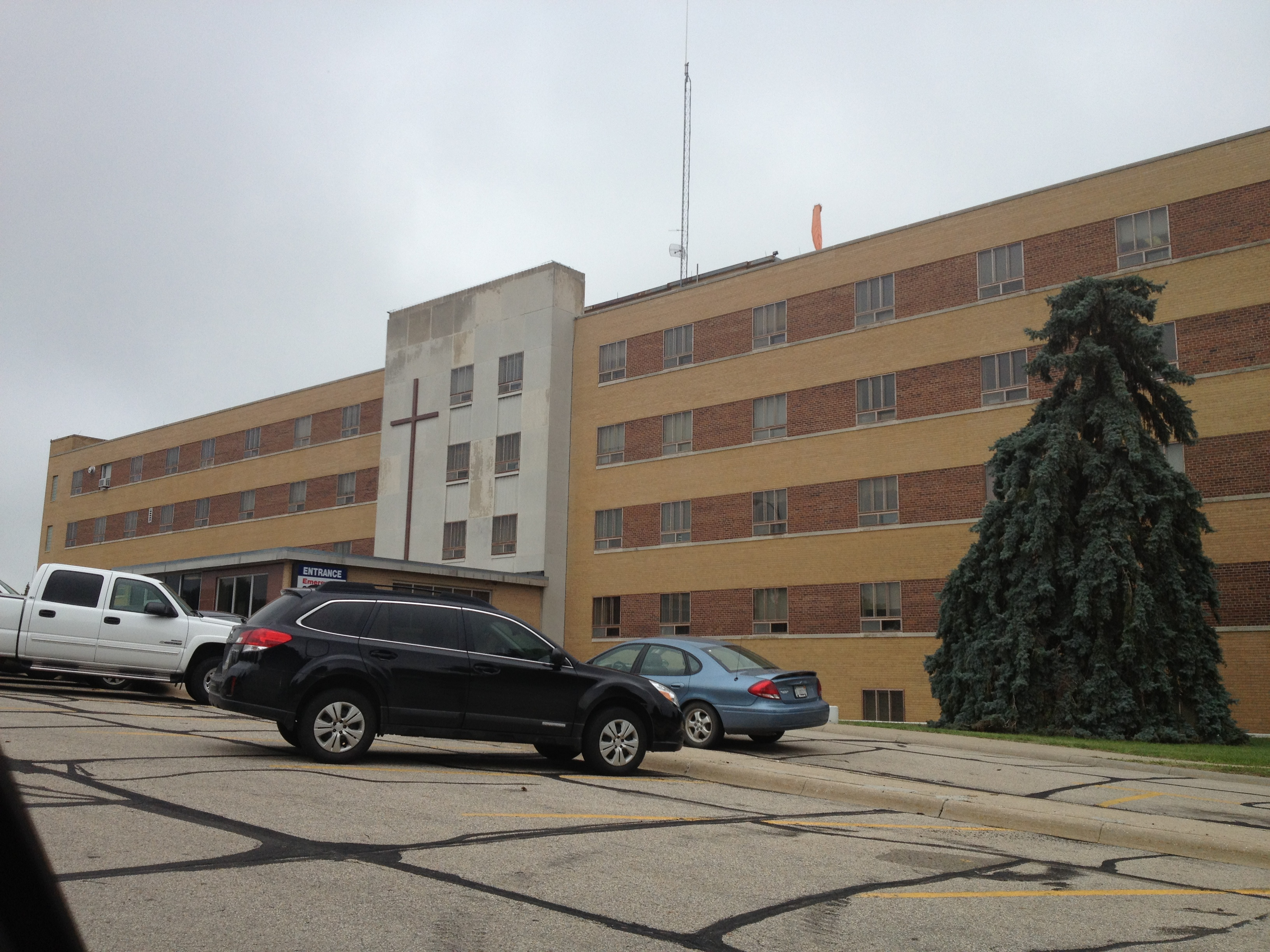
- Cloud County Health Center view from northeast

Geography
- Location: Concordia, Kansas, United States
- Coordinates: 39°33′56″N 97°40′25″W

Organization
- Care system: Private
- Type: County
- Affiliated university: None (formerly Sisters of St. Joseph)

Services
- Beds: 150

History
- Opened: 1903

Links
- Website: CCHC.com
- Lists: Hospitals in Kansas

Cloud County Health Center is a medical facility located in Concordia, Kansas. The health center was founded as St. Joseph's Hospital in 1903 by the Nazareth Convent and Academy in Concordia (run by the Sisters of St. Joseph). In 1995, ownership was transferred from the Sisters of St. Joseph to Salina Regional Health Center (Salina, Kansas), and the name was then changed to the Cloud County Health Center.

== Services ==
The hospital offers a range of services including an on-site laboratory licensed in accordance with the Clinical Laboratory Improvement Act, emergency services, intensive care, pharmacy, and other health-related services. The health center is a participating Medicare and Medicaid provider.

== Plans ==
The health center plans to build a new hospital to replace the aging existing buildings. The plan to construct a new $20-million hospital, and acquire $5 million in new equipment, was announced in November 2007.

== Board of directors ==
The CCHC Board of Directors is made up of 11 members: four officers, and seven members.

Officers

- Suzy Tuggle - President
- Richard Kueker, OD - Vice President
- JoAnne Balthazor - Treasurer
- Pam Campbell - Secretary

Members

- Joel Figgs
- John Gisselbeck
- Christy Hasch
- Renea Gernant
- Ryan McMillan
- Steve Palmquist
- Sister Beth Stover

== Board of trustees ==
The CCHC Board of Trustees is made up of 12 members, four as officers, and eight as members.

Officers

- Dr. Monte Wentz - Chairman
- Eric Andersen - Vice Chairman
- Charles Zimmerman - Treasurer
- S. Christy Hasch - Secretary

Members

- Kurt Kocher
- Dr. Greg Hattan
- Dr. Justin Poore
- Mike Lamm
- Todd Leif
- Scott Seifert
- Phil Gilliland
- Traci Ferrell
