= Marie Cecilia Mangold =

American mathematician, educator (1872–1934)

- Born: Josephine Margaret Mangold; December 5, 1872; Cincinnati, Ohio
- Died: February 9, 1934 (aged 61); Washington D.C.
- Burial place: Mount Olivet Cemetery
- Other name: Sister Marie Cecilia
- Education: Trinity Washington University; Catholic University of America
- Occupations: Mathematician, university professor and Catholic nun
- Known for: Math PhD before 1940s

Marie Cecilia Mangold (1872–1934) (born Josephine Margaret Mangold and later known as Sister Marie Cecilia) was an American mathematician, university professor and Catholic nun. She was only the second nun to earn a doctorate in the United States in mathematics.

== Biography ==
She was born on December 5, 1872, as Josephine Margaret Mangold in Cincinnati, Ohio, the daughter of Matthew Mangold, who had emigrated to the United States from Bavaria, Germany, and Mary Anna Hemann. Of the couple's ten children, eight survived. Their mother was a housewife and their father sold imported wines and liquors until he died around 1900.

Josephine attended a parish school in Cincinnati and later the Academy of the Sisters of Notre Dame de Namur. In 1898, she began her novitiate and in 1900 she entered that same religious order. In 1901, using the name Sister Marie Cecilia, she began studying mathematics at Trinity College (now known as Trinity Washington University) located in Washington D.C.

Sister Marie Cecilia earned her bachelor's degree in mathematics and physics in 1910 from Trinity and followed that with her master's degree in mathematics and chemistry in 1914; her thesis was titled: Application of the complex variable to certain problems in metric geometry. In 1929, she received her doctorate in mathematics from the Catholic University of America, becoming only the second nun in the United States to do so, after Sister Mary Gervase Kelley. Marie Cecilia's dissertation, supervised by Aubrey Edward Landry, was titled: The Loci Described by the Vertices of Singly Infinite Systems of Triangles Circumscribed about a Fixed Conic.

For more than thirty years as a faculty member and department director at Trinity College, Sister Marie Cecilia was mostly alone in the mathematics department, which usually had only one or two instructors. The first classes she taught were trigonometry, solid geometry, analytic geometry, advanced algebra, differential calculus, integral calculus, theory of equations, theory of determinants and history of mathematics. In 1907, she introduced analytical mechanics, and three years later she added advanced calculus and a teachers' course with a calculus prerequisite. In 1914, three advanced courses for graduates were added (differential equations, vector analysis and projective geometry). In 1919, she added some practical mathematics for physics and chemistry students, and in 1923, statistical methods was added. She taught at Trinity until her death at 61.

She died on February 9, 1934, at Trinity College, and was buried at Mount Olivet Cemetery in Washington, D.C.

== Memberships ==
- American Mathematical Society
- Mathematical Association of America

== Selected publications ==
- 1927: Methods of Measuring the Reliability of Tests. The Catholic Education Press, Washington, DC. Educational Research Bulletins, Vol. 2, No. 8.
- 1929: with Sister Mary Louise M'Graw: Group Intelligence Tests in the Primary Grades. The Catholic Education Press, Washington, DC. Educational Research Bulletins, Vol. 4, No. 2.
