= David E. Zitarelli =

American mathematician

David Earl Zitarelli (August 12, 1941, Chester, Pennsylvania – December 3, 2018) was an American mathematician and historian of mathematics, known for his 2-volume work on the history of mathematics (before 1942) in the United States and Canada.

== Biography ==
Zitarelli grew up in Holmes, Delaware County, Pennsylvania. He graduated in 1959 from Ridley High School. At Temple University he graduated in 1963 with a bachelor's degree and in 1965 with a master's degree. He married Anita Paul in 1966. He received his Ph.D. in 1970 from Pennsylvania State University. His Ph.D. thesis Subdirectory irreducible finite inverse semigroups was supervised by Mario Petrich (1932–2015), famous among mathematicians for his research in semigroup theory. From 1970 to 2012, David Zitarelli was a faculty member in the mathematics department of Temple University. In 2012 he retired as professor emeritus and he and his wife moved to Minnesota. During his first decade at Temple University, he did research on algebraic semigroups. In 1977 he was promoted to associate professor and gained tenure. Beginning in 1984, he collaborated with Raymond F. Coughlin (who joined Temple University's faculty in 1970) on a dozen textbooks (including multiple editions). Zitarelli later collaborated with David R. Hill (who joined Temple University's faculty in 1973) on the textbook Linear Algebra Labs with MATLAB. During his 42 years at Temple University, Zitarelli won several teaching awards. He wrote a history, covering the years 1926 to 2000) of the Eastern Pennsylvania and Delaware Section (EPaDel or EPADEL) of the Mathematical Association of America (MAA).

In 2004 Zitarelli began working on his comprehensive history of mathematics in the United States and Canada. He completed the first volume, covering the years from 1492 to 1900, in 2018 and was working hard to complete the second volume, covering the years since 1900, when he died suddenly from a heart attack. The second volume, published in 2021, was completed (up through the year 1941) by Della Dumbaugh and Stephen F. Kennedy, professor emeritus at Carleton College. In 2015 the MAA's online journal Convergence published Zitarelli's article Alan Turing in America.

When David Zitarelli died in 2018 after 52 years of marriage, he was survived by his widow, a son, a daughter, and four grandchildren.

== Selected publications ==
=== Articles ===
- Zitarelli, David E. (1977). "Subdirectly irreducible Rees matrix semigroups". Bulletin of the Australian Mathematical Society. 16 (3): 351–359. doi:10.1017/S0004972700023455.
- "Chapter. The Genesis of the Moore Method by David E. Zitarelli". Proceedings of the Ninth Midwest History of Mathematics Conference, held on the 4th & 5th of October 2002 at Miami University in Oxford, Ohio. VITA. 2002. pp. 21–32.
- Zitarelli, David E. (2004). "The Origin and Early Impact of the Moore Method". The American Mathematical Monthly. 111 (6): 465–486. doi:10.1080/00029890.2004.11920102. S2CID 36081511.
- Zitarelli, David E. (2005). "In the Shadow of Giants: A Section of American Mathematicians, 1925–1950". Mathematics Magazine. 78 (3): 175–191. doi:10.1080/0025570X.2005.11953324. S2CID 115073800.
- Zitarelli, David E. (2005). "The Bicentennial of American Mathematics Journals". The College Mathematics Journal. 36: 2–15. doi:10.1080/07468342.2005.11922105. S2CID 122875499.
- Shell-Gellasch, Amy, ed. (2007). "Chapter. Was Pythagoras Chinese? by David E. Zitarelli". Hands on History: A Resource for Teaching Mathematics. MAA Notes #72. Mathematical Association of America. pp. 41–48. ISBN 978-0-88385-182-1.
- Zitarelli, David E. (2007). "Straddling centuries: The struggles of a mathematician and his university to enter the ranks of research mathematics, 1870–1950". Historia Mathematica. 34 (3): 271–288. doi:10.1016/j.hm.2006.10.005.
- Zitarelli, D.E. (2009). "Connected sets and the AMS, 1901–1921" (PDF). Notices of the AMS. 56 (4): 450–458.
- Bartlow, Thomas L.; Zitarelli, David E. (2009). "Who Was Miss Mullikin?". The American Mathematical Monthly. 116 (2): 99–114. doi:10.1080/00029890.2009.11920918. S2CID 38136572. (See Anna Mullikin.)
- Zitarelli, D.E. (September 2011). "The 1904 St. Louis Congress and Westward Expansion of American Mathematics" (PDF). Notices of the AMS. 58 (8): 1100–1111.
- Zitarelli, David (2011). "Hilbert in Missouri". Mathematics Magazine. 84 (5): 351–364. doi:10.4169/math.mag.84.5.351. S2CID 123603138.
- Kennedy, Stephen F., ed. (2015). "Chapter. The Mathematical Association of America: Its First 100 Years by David E. Zitarelli". A Century of Advancing Mathematics. Washington, D.C.: The Mathematical Association of America. pp. 135–158. ISBN 978-0-88385-588-1. LCCN 2015936096; associate editors, Donald J. Albers, Gerald L. Alexanderson, Della Dumbaugh, Frank A. Farris, Deanna B. Haunsperger, & Paul Zorn; xi+423 pages; illustrations (some color); online text at maa.org
- Zitarelli, D.E. (2015). "David Rittenhouse: Modern Mathematician" (PDF). Notices of the AMS. 62 (1): 11–14.
- David E. Zitarelli (2015). "The First 100 Years of the MAA". The American Mathematical Monthly. 122: 4–23. doi:10.4169/amer.math.monthly.122.01.4. S2CID 28938157.

=== Books ===
- Exercises in group theory. New York: Plenum Press. 1972. ISBN 0306305054. LCCN 78141243; by E. S. Lyapin, A. Ya. Aizenshtat, and M. M. Lesokhin. Translated by David E. Zitarelli
- Ascent of mathematics. New York: McGraw-Hill. 1984. ISBN 0070132151. LCCN 83017548; by Raymond Coughlin, David E. Zitarelli
- Finite mathematics with applications. Philadelphia: Saunders College Publication. 1989; by David E. Zitarelli, Raymond F. Coughlin; 2nd edition 1992 LCCN 91-58104 ISBN 0030558646
- Calculus with applications. Philadelphia: Saunders College Publications. 1989. LCCN 89127031; by Raymond F. Coughlin, David E. Zitarelli; 2nd edition 1993 LCCN 92-50299 ISBN 0030557577
- Finite mathematics with calculus: an applied approach. Philadelphia: Saunders College Publications. 1989. LCCN 89060301; by David E. Zitarelli, Raymond F. Coughlin; 2nd edition 1992 LCCN 91-58103 ISBN 0030558492
- Brief calculus with applications. Philadelphia: Saunders College Publications. 1990. ISBN 0030315972. LCCN 89043049; by Raymond F. Coughlin, David E. Zitarelli
