= Talithia Williams =

American mathematician and statistician

Talithia D. Williams
- Education: Spelman College; Howard University; Rice University
- Known for: Spatial–temporal modeling of rainfall data
- Spouse: Donald Williams
- Scientific career
- Fields: Statistics
- Workplaces: Harvey Mudd College
- Thesis: Real-time estimation of rainfall: A dynamic spatio-temporal model (2008)
- Doctoral advisor: Katherine Bennett Ensor

Talithia D. Williams is an American Statistician. She also serves as a Mathematician Professor and Mathematics Clinic Director at Harvey Mudd College, who researches the spatiotemporal structure of data. Williams was the first African American Woman to achieve tenure at Harvey Mudd College. She is an advocate for engaging more African Americans in engineering and science fields.

== Biography ==
Talithia D. Williams was born in Columbus, Georgia. She attended Columbus High School where her appreciation for mathematical sciences was cultivated. She voluntarily competed in competitive math exams, where she was among the students who was advanced to the next round.

Williams is married to Donald Williams and they have three sons together.

== Education ==
Williams attended Spelman College to obtain her bachelor's degree of science with a major in mathematics and a minor in physics. Through the mentorship of the late Claudia Alexander, Williams participated in NASA’s Jet Propulsion Laboratory for three summer sessions while in undergrad. She then earned a graduate degree in mathematics from Howard University. Williams also participated as a mentee in the four-week residental EDGE program, an initiative that prepares people of color to pursue doctoral degrees in mathematical sciences. She subsequently attended Rice University, where she earned a Ph.D in statistics.

== Career and Research ==
Williams has worked at the Jet Propulsion Laboratory (JPL), the National Security Agency (NSA), and NASA. She is an associate professor of mathematics and also serves as Associate Dean for Research and Experiential Learning at Harvey Mudd College. She is Secretary and Treasurer for the EDGE Foundation which sponsors summer programs for minority women, and on the boards of the MAA and SACNAS. Williams has done significant outreach, with the goal of bringing mathematics to life and "rebranding the field of mathematics as anything but dry, technical or male-dominated but instead a logical, productive career path that is crucial to the future of the country."

Williams has developed statistical models focused on understanding the structure of spatiotemporal data, with environmental applications. She has partnered with the World Health Organization in developing a cataract model used to predict the cataract surgical rate for countries in Africa.

Williams was a host of two PBS series; (1) Six-part NOVA Wonders in April 2018, and (2) five-part NOVA Universe Revealed in November 2021. She is the author of the book Power in Numbers: The Rebel Women of Mathematics (Race Point Publishing, 2018).

=== TED Talk ===
In 2014, Williams gave a highly viewed TED talk titled "Own Your Body's Data". In this speech, she expressed the importance of collecting data and how data can help you make well-informed decisions. She goes on to mention her third pregnancy experience, where the doctor's advised her to be induced at 41 and 1/2 weeks due to the baby being under stress. After initial concern of the inconsistency of the stress testing, Williams seeks additional data by asking questions. Once the additional data is obtained, her husband and herself decided against being induced because the data did not prove a necessity for an induction. She then provided other personal examples to express the importance of knowing all the data in order to make well-informed decisions. Williams challenged the audience to utilize data to take charge of their own health.

== Awards/Honors ==
In 2015, Williams received the MAA Henry L. Alder Award for exemplary teaching by an early career mathematics professor. Williams was honored by the Association for Women in Mathematics and the Mathematical Association of America, when they selected her to be the AWM/MAA Falconer Lecturer at MathFest 2017 in Chicago, IL. The title of her talk is "Not So Hidden Figures: Unveiling Mathematical Talent." Williams was also recognized by Mathematically Gifted & Black as a Black History Month 2017 Honoree. She received the 2022 Joint Policy Board for Mathematics Communication Award "for bringing mathematics and statistics into the homes of millions through her work as a TV host, renowned speaker, and author."
