= Mary Nicholas Arnoldy =

Roman Catholic nun and mathematician (1893–1985)

Sister Mary Nicholas Arnoldy C. S. J., Ph.D.
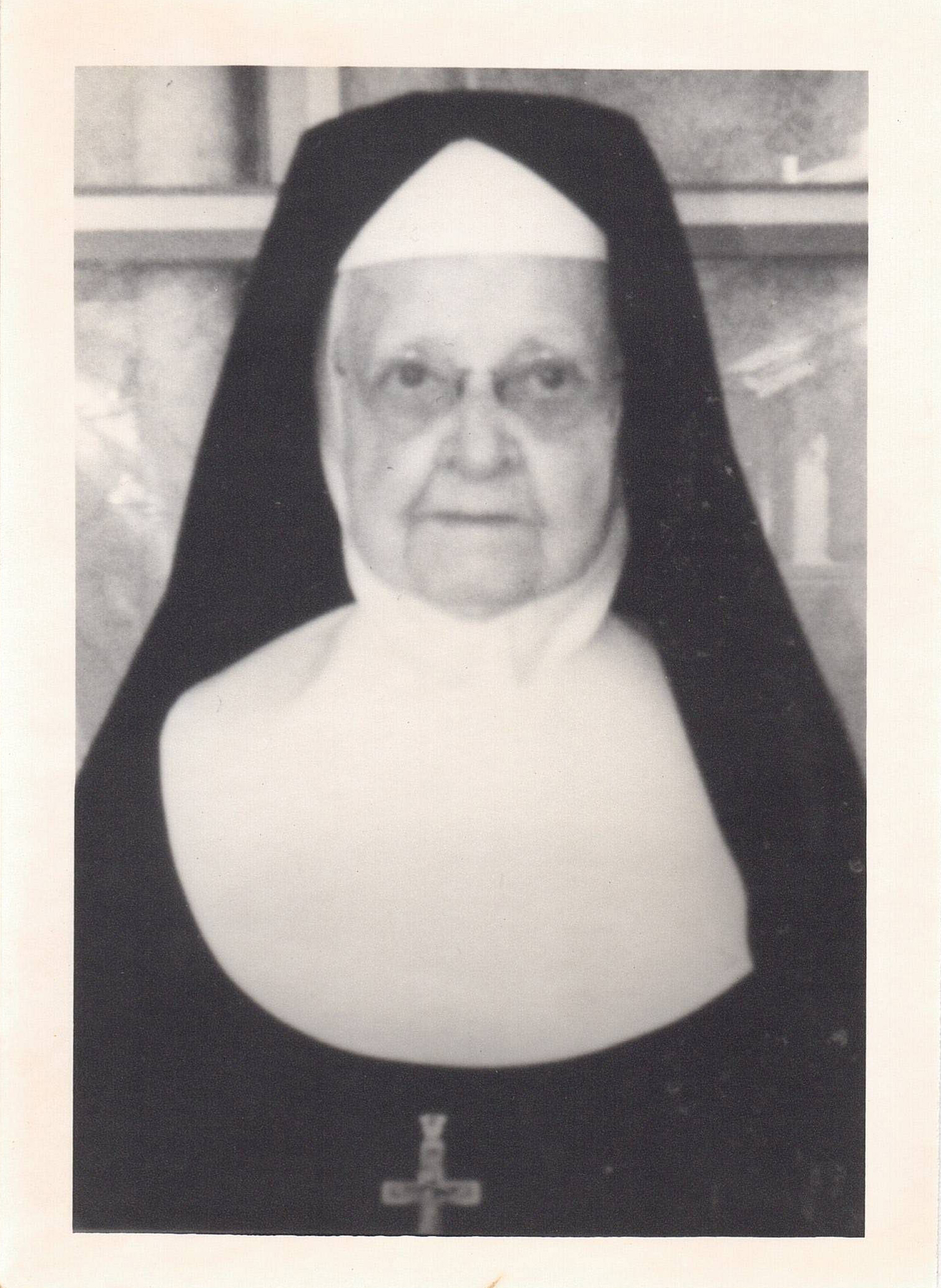

Personal life
- Born: Katherine Helen Arnoldy; March 7, 1893 Tipton, Mitchell, Kansas, US
- Died: September 28, 1985 (aged 92) Concordia, Cloud, Kansas, US

Religious life
- Religion: Roman Catholic

Mary Nicholas Arnoldy (1893–1985) was a Roman Catholic Sister of St. Joseph of Concordia (Kansas), and a mathematician. Along with M. Henrietta Reilly, and Mary Domitilla Thuener, she was one of a very few women and Catholic sisters to earn a doctorate in mathematics before 1940.

== Early life and education ==
She was born Katherine Helen Arnoldy to Anna Katherine Holz (1855–1944), born in Iowa, and Nicholas "Nick" Arnoldy (1844–1920), born in Kaschenbach, Bitburg-Prum, Rheinland-Pfalz, Germany. She had nine sisters and brothers. Each of her parents had an eighth-grade education, and her father worked as a retail grocer.

She went to Catholic grade school in Tipton, Kansas, and then attended Nazareth Academy in Concordia, Kansas. In 1910 she entered the Nazareth Convent, and she professed her first vows in 1912. She and two other sisters joined the Sisters of St. Joseph of Concordia. Her oldest sister Elizabeth, who died at age 29, became Sister Mary Modesta. Her sister Mary became Sister Mary Domitilla (not to be confused with mathematician Mary Domitilla Thuener), and taught biology at the same college where Mary Nicholas Arnoldy would spend her mathematics career. There was also a sister Cleophas Arnoldy, who may have also been a relative.

She taught in Kansas for 17 years before beginning doctoral studies, working at Kansas schools in Antonino and Emmeram (1912)--both near one another—and then traveling three hours away to Manhattan, Kansas (1925). Between the first two and Manhattan she taught in Schoenchen. The sisters had sent a group to open a parochial school there in 1904, and Arnoldy went there in 1917. While teaching she attended undergraduate school. From 1921 to 1923 she was a student at the Fort Hays Kansas State Normal School (now Fort Hays State University). In 1923–24 she broke a barrier at the Jesuits' Creighton University in Omaha, Nebraska, by becoming one of the first women to study education there. In the winters she went to New York City to study music, once course at a time, at Manhattanville College of the Sacred Heart, in its Pius X School of Liturgical Music. After this somewhat patchwork of education and employment, in 1929 she finally received her bachelor's degree from Kansas State Agricultural College (now Kansas State University).

That same graduation year, 1929, she went to Washington, DC to study at Catholic University of America, earning a master's degree in mathematics in 1930. Then in 1933 she earned a Ph.D. there (minoring in physics and education) with the dissertation, The Reality of the Double Tangents of the Rational Symmetric Quartic Curve, under Aubrey Edward Landry.

== Mathematics career ==
After her doctorate she returned to Kansas to join the faculty at Marymount College (now closed). It was founded by her congregation in 1921, a year after women could vote, and was the first four-year liberal arts college in Kansas to admit women. She became a member of the American Mathematical Society. Some of her algebra courses were televised in the early 1960s on KCKT-TV Channel 2. She became chair of the department of mathematics, and sometimes served as registrar. One of her papers was “Reality of the double tangent contact parameters of the rational symmetric quartic curve” (Mathematical Association of America, 1934). She retired in 1966.

== Legacy and death ==
After retirement from Marymount College, she taught mathematics at Sacred Heart High School in Salina, Kansas, and also at Notre Dame High School in Concordia. She also worked at Central Catholic High School in Grand Island, Nebraska.

She retired fully at age 80, moving to the Medaille Center in Salina, Kansas, that later became the site of St. John's Hospital. She was a master tatter, and an avid gardener, and pursued them both more fully. Ten years later she returned to the Nazareth Motherhouse in Concordia. She died two years later, at age 92, in 1985, in her 76th year of religious life. She is buried in Nazareth Convent Cemetery, Concordia, Cloud County, Kansas.
