= Mother of Mercy High School (Cincinnati, Ohio) =

Location
- 3036 Werk Road; Cincinnati, (Hamilton County), Ohio 45211-7042; United States; 39°8′28″N 84°36′6″W

Information
- Type: Private, All-Girls
- Motto: Be Inspired
- Religious affiliation: Roman Catholic
- Opened: 1915; 111 years ago
- Closed: May 30, 2018; 8 years ago
- Grades: 9-12
- Enrollment: 531 (2015–16)
- Colors: Blue and white
- Athletics conference: Girls Greater Cincinnati League
- Mascot: Bobcat
- Accreditation: North Central Association of Colleges and Schools, Ohio Catholic Schools Accrediting Association
- Tuition: $9,250
- Affiliation: Sisters of Mercy
- Website: www.motherofmercy.org

Mother of Mercy High School was an all-girls Catholic, private high school in Cincinnati, Ohio. It was one of almost 40 Sisters of Mercy secondary schools in the United States and also a Blue Ribbon School. It opened in 1915 and in 2018 merged with another Sisters of Mercy school, McAuley High School, due to lacking enrollment numbers at both schools. The merged school, Mercy McAuley High School, opened at what was the McAuley campus in fall 2018.

In 2018, the closed school was sold to Cincinnati Public Schools for the price of $2.85 million. Gamble Montessori High School uses the former Mother of Mercy building.

== Notable people ==
M. Henrietta Reilly, R. S. M., Ph.D., mathematics teacher.

== Ohio High School Athletic Association State Championships ==
- Girls Volleyball – 1977, 1980, 1982, 2007
