= Mary de Lellis Gough =

Irish-American mathematician

- Born: Mary de Lellis; February 15, 1892; Kilmore, County Wexford
- Died: April 7, 1983 (aged 91)
- Education: Catholic University of America
- Occupations: Nun and teacher
- Employer: Incarnate Word College
- Organization: Sisters of Charity of the Incarnate Word

Sister Mary de Lellis Gough (15 February 1892 – 7 April 1983) was an Irish nun who spent most of her life in the USA. She is notable for being the earliest known Irish woman to earn a doctorate in mathematics.

== Life ==
She was born in Kilmore, County Wexford, Ireland. Her parents were Ellen Dunne and Walter Gough. She attended the local St John of God's primary school. She emigrated to Texas in 1909 with a group of young Irish women, and joined the Sisters of Charity of the Incarnate Word, taking vows as Mary de Lellis in 1911.

== Career ==
While working as a high school teacher, she studied at the Catholic University of America. She graduated in 1920, earned a master's degree in 1923, and completed her PhD from the same university in 1931. Her PhD dissertation was entitled On the condition for the existence of triangles in and circumscribed to certain types of the rational quartic curve and having a common side and supervised by Aubrey E. Landry.

She taught mathematics at Incarnate Word College from 1920 to 1943. In 1953, she coined the term "mathephobia" based on her observations of her students.

In 1944, she left teaching due to health issues and returned to Texas where she worked as an accountant at a local hospital in Fort Worth. She retired in 1964.
