= M. Henrietta Reilly =

Roman Catholic nun and mathematician (1895–1964)

Sister M. Henrietta Reilly R.S.M.
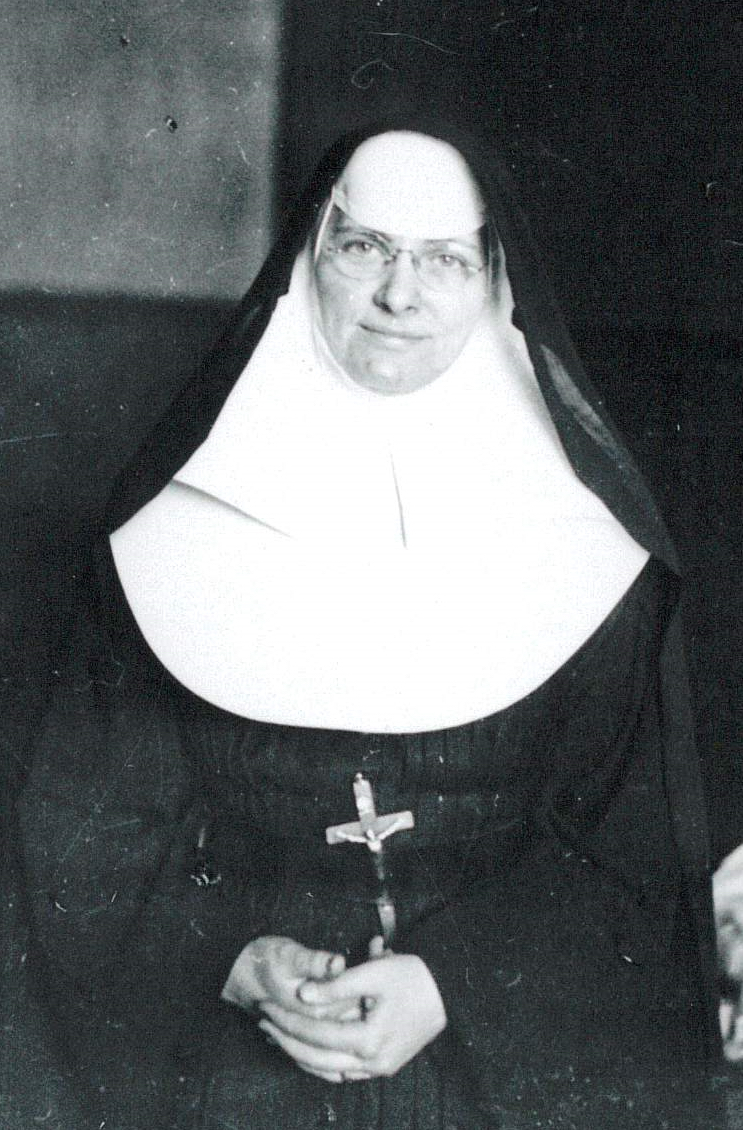

Personal life
- Born: February 14, 1895 Chicago, Illinois, US
- Died: April 21, 1964 (aged 69) Hamilton, Ohio, US

Religious life
- Religion: Roman Catholic

Mary Henrietta Reilly (born Margaret Reilly; February 14 1895 – April 21, 1964) was an American Roman Catholic nun and mathematician. She was one of 240 women who earned a mathematics doctorate before 1940.

== Early life and education ==
Reilly was born on February 14, 1895, in Chicago, to Agnes Finn Reilly and Michael Reilly. Her birth name was Margaret Reilly. Her mother was a homemaker, and her father was a public works employee. She had two siblings. She graduated from Mother of Mercy High School in Cincinnati in June 1914, and immediately entered the congregation of the Religious Sisters of Mercy of Cincinnati. Some sources say Our Lady of Mercy High School (Ohio), but Mother of Mercy seems more likely because it was run by the Sisters of Mercy. She was perpetually vowed in August 1917.

She was a teacher in Cincinnati before and during college, teaching music and English in all grades from 1914 to 1928 at St. Edward School, St. Andrew School, Our Lady of Mercy Academy, Elder High School and Mother of Mercy Academy. During this period she earned a B. A. on June 18, 1923, from St. Xavier College (now Xavier University) in Cincinnati, Ohio, and an M. A. in 1925 with a major in sociology and a minor in philosophy. Although Xavier was a Jesuit college for men, she and other sisters from a number of regional congregations were allowed to attend special classes at nights and on weekends. She earned a PhD in 1936 from the Catholic University of America in Washington, DC. She was in residence in Washington off and on, sometimes both studying and teaching at the Teachers' College of the Athenaeum of Ohio. Her dissertation was Self-Symmetric Quadrilaterals In-and-Circumscribed to the Plane Rational Quartic Curve with a Line of Symmetry, directed by Dr. Aubrey E. Landry. In it she cites the mathematic work of other nuns, including Sister Felice Vaudreuil, Sister Helen Sullivan, Sister Laetitia Hill, Sister Domitilla Thuener, Sister Leonarda Burke, and Sister Mary Nicholas Arnoldy. Their inclusion at the opening of the thesis makes it clear she thought of their work as interconnected, and this could form the basis of more research on these sister-mathematicians.

== Mathematics career ==
She returned to Cincinnati to stay, also returning to the Teachers' College of the Athenaeum of Ohio in the Corryville neighborhood of Cincinnati, to teach mathematics. "She could have quit teaching," a former student recalled, "but she felt we needed her, and she was right." She headed the math department from 1939 to 1949, and remained on its faculty until 1953, when the Teachers' College ended. From 1953, she taught math, English, religion, history, chemistry, and Latin in high schools, including a high school in Piqua, Ohio, 1953–55, and at Cincinnati's Our Lady of Mercy High School from 1955 to 1956. During the last eight years of her life she taught at Mother of Mercy High School (Cincinnati, Ohio). She died on April 21, 1964, aged 69, in Mercy Hospital, in Hamilton, Ohio.
