= Mercy McAuley High School =

Location
- 6000 Oakwood Avenue; Cincinnati, (Hamilton County), Ohio 45224-2334; United States
- 39°12′2″N 84°33′12″W

Information
- Type: Private, All-Female
- Established: 1915
- Oversight: Sisters of Mercy of the Americas
- NCES School ID: 01056675
- President: Vacant
- Principal: Connie Kampschmidt
- Grades: 9-12
- Enrollment: 462 (2017–18)
- Colors: Orange and Gray
- Athletics conference: Girls Greater Cincinnati League
- Team name: Wolves
- Accreditation: North Central Association of Colleges and Schools, Ohio Catholic School Accrediting Association
- Tuition: $11,600 plus $600 for the annual technology fee
- Affiliation: Roman Catholic Archdiocese of Cincinnati
- Website: www.mercymcauley.org

Mercy McAuley High School is an all-girls Catholic high school in the College Hill neighborhood of Cincinnati, Ohio, United States. Sponsored by the Sisters of Mercy of the Americas, it is one of five all-girls high schools in the Roman Catholic Archdiocese of Cincinnati, enrolling young women from all over the Cincinnati area and parts of Indiana. It is designated a National Blue Ribbon School by the United States Department of Education. Mercy McAuley formed from the 2018 merger of Mother of Mercy High School and McAuley High School and is located at the former McAuley campus.

== History ==
Mercy McAuley High School formed from the 2018 merger of Mother of Mercy High School and McAuley High School. Mother of Mercy, the older of the two, had been founded in 1915.

The McAuley High School tradition, which began in Ireland in 1831, is rooted in the ideals of the foundress of the Sisters of Mercy, Catherine McAuley, who believed in the importance of the education of women. In 1958, Archbishop Karl J. Alter chose the Sisters of Mercy to establish a new high school in College Hill. The Archbishop donated 15 acres of land and handed over the responsibility of constructing the school to the Sisters of Mercy. The Sisters of Mercy broke ground on August 28, 1958, and in 1960 the school opened with an enrollment of 200 young women (freshmen only). A class was added in each of the next three years. The first graduating class was in 1964. The original building still stands today. In 2002, seven new science labs, a fitness room, two music rooms, a conference room, and an expanded gymnasium and cafeteria were added to better accommodate the growing needs of the students. In 2008, the school completed a renovation of the original 1,000-seat auditorium. On March 2, 2017, it was announced that in 2018, McAuley would merge with Mother of Mercy High School due to lacking enrollment numbers. McAuley held a closing mass on May 27, 2018. In August that same year, the merged school, Mercy McAuley High School, opened at McAuley's original campus.

=== Academics ===
In compliance with the State of Ohio Minimum Standards, 24 credits are required for graduation. The credit requirements for graduation include 4 Theology, 4 English, 3.5 Social Studies, 3 Science, 0.5 Physical Education, 0.5 Health, 1 Fine Arts, 4 Mathematics, 0.5 Computer Literacy, and 2 Foreign Language. Students must take a minimum of six credits per year and be scheduled for at least six courses per semester. The school year is divided into 2 semesters and exams are administered at the end of each semester (before Christmas break and before summer break).

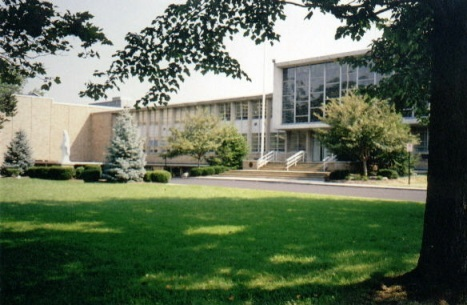
McAuley High School

Mercy McAuley utilizes a progressive schedule that allows for longer class time. The schedule is based on a four-day rotation. Each day, a student will have two 80-minute classes and four 50-minute classes. Each student will have a total of eight scheduled classes with only six classes occurring each day. Out of a four-day rotation, each one of a student's classes will meet three out of four days. On day five, the four-day rotation begins again.

== Awards and recognition ==
During the 1999-2000 school year, McAuley High School was recognized with the Blue Ribbon School Award of Excellence by the United States Department of Education, the highest award an American school can receive.

A joint vocal ensemble from McAuley and LaSalle High Schools won the Overall Grand Champion Award at the 2006 Nashville Music Festival in April.

== Ohio High School Athletic Association State Championships ==
- Girls Volleyball - 2023
- Girls Individual Golf - 2022 - Kylee Heidemann
