= Pioneering Women in American Mathematics =

Book by Judy Green and Jeanne LaDuke

- Author: Judy Green and Jeanne LaDuke
- Language: English
- Publisher: American Mathematical Society
- Publication date: 16 December 2008
- ISBN: 978-0821843765

Pioneering Women in American Mathematics: The Pre-1940 PhD's is a book on women in mathematics. It was written by Judy Green and Jeanne LaDuke, based on a long study beginning in 1978, and was published in 2009 by the American Mathematical Society and London Mathematical Society as volume 34 in their joint History of Mathematics series. Unlike many previous works on the topic, it aims at encyclopedic coverage of women in mathematics in the pre-World War II United States, rather than focusing only on the biographies of individual women or on collecting stories of only the most famous women in mathematics. The Basic Library List Committee of the Mathematical Association of America has strongly recommended its inclusion in undergraduate mathematics libraries.

== Topics ==
The first part of the book discusses the institutions that granted doctorates to women in mathematics before 1940, and the milieu in which they operated, including typical practices of the time of that demanded that women resign on marriage, that forbade institutions from hiring wives or other relatives of their male faculty, or in some cases prevented women who had done all the work for a graduate degree from being granted one. It also discusses the patterns the authors' found in these women's lives, including the discovery that their life expectancies were higher than typical for their time. Its eight chapters include material on the family background of the subjects, their undergraduate and graduate education, hiring and careers, and their contributions to mathematics.

The second part of the book provides biographical profiles of every woman that the authors could identify as having earned a doctorate in mathematics in the US before 1940, as well as four American women who earned doctorates abroad, giving 228 in all. The typical biography in this section is approximately 2/3 of a page to a page in length, with information drawn from reference works, review journals, and archival material as well as interviews with the subjects still living at the time of the study. The 1940 cutoff for the biographies in the book represents both a time of "a precipitous drop in enrollment" for women in mathematics, and the starting time for two previous studies on women in mathematics and science by Margaret A. M. Murray and Margaret W. Rossiter. The rate of doctorates given to women in the period covered by the book, approximately 14%, would not be reached again until the 1980s.

A companion web site provides additional information on the subjects of the book, and can be considered as a third and "potentially most valuable" section of the book itself.

== Audience and reception ==
This book is readable by a general audience, but reviewer Charles Ashbacher writes that "only people deeply interested in the history of mathematics, particularly in the role of women, will find it a critical read", and suggests that the second half should be used as reference material rather than reading it through. Reviewer Amy Shell-Gellasch agrees, writing "It is intended as a reference, not necessarily as a book to sit down and read." Reviewer Silke Göbel adds that, beyond mathematics, the book will also be of interests to sociologists.

Ashbacher rates the book as "an excellent resource for information in this area". Despite calling it "a labor of love" and "an important contribution", Shell-Gellasch writes that she was "disappointed by the lack of references" in the book, although significantly more references can be found in the companion web site. In contrast, reviewer Andrea Blunck calls the book "really fascinating", writing that she was "surprised to learn how numerous" these women were, "and how different yet how similar their lives and careers were". And reviewer Margaret A. M. Murray calls the book "spectacular" and "a stunning historical achievement", writing that because of it "we now know more about this first cohort of American women mathematicians than we know about any cohort of mathematicians, male or female."

== Notable mentions ==
- Mary Nicholas Arnoldy
- Grace Hopper
- M. Henrietta Reilly
