= Fabian Franklin =

American mathematician, engineer and journalist 1853 - 1939

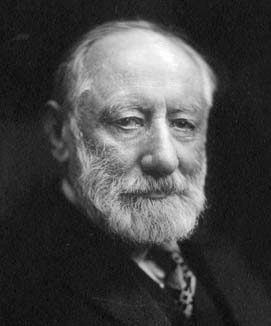
- Born: January 18, 1853; Eger, Kingdom of Hungary
- Died: January 9, 1939 (aged 85); New York City
- Resting place: Ferncliff Cemetery; 41°01′39″N 73°49′56″W
- Education: Columbian College; Johns Hopkins University
- Spouse: Christine Ladd-Franklin
- Scientific career
- Fields: Mathematics, Engineering, Journalism
- Workplaces: Baltimore City Council; Johns Hopkins University; New York Post
- Thesis: Bipunctual Coordinates (1880)
- Doctoral advisor: James Joseph Sylvester
- Notable students: Henry A. Bumstead

Fabian Franklin (1853–1939) was a Hungarian-born American engineer, mathematician and journalist, husband of Christine Ladd-Franklin.

== Life and work ==
The Franklin family (his parents were born in Poland) migrated from Hungary to Philadelphia (United States) when Fabian Franklin was four years old and they afterwards moved to Washington, D.C. in 1861. He was educated at Columbian College (now George Washington University) where he graduated Ph.B. in 1869. Franklin worked the following seven years as surveyor and engineer for the Baltimore City Council.

When Johns Hopkins University was founded in 1876, he had the opportunity to study mathematics, his true passion. He was awarded a doctorate in 1880 and he was the assistant of James Joseph Sylvester till his return to England in 1883, applying the new calculational techniques to compute binary forms. In 1882 he married Christine Ladd-Franklin; the marriage was a marriage of equals, based on their shared concerns, both social and intellectual. They both studied with Charles Sanders Peirce. During his short university period, some fifteen years, he published thirty papers, most of which appeared in the American Journal of Mathematics.

In 1895 he left the university to begin a new career as journalist and writer. First as editor of Baltimore News (from 1895 to 1908) and afterward as associate editor of New York Evening Post (from 1909 to 1919). He wrote some remarkable books on social, economic and political issues like Cost of living (1915), What Prohibition Has Done to America (1922) and Plain Talks on Economics: Leading Principles and Their Application to the Issues of Today (1924) among others. He collaborated in the launching of The Weekly Review (1919–1922), a journal devoted to the Consideration of Politics, of Social and Economic Tendencies, of History, Literature, and the Arts. He also wrote a biography of the founding president of Johns Hopkins University, The Life of Daniel Coit Gilman (1910).

== Bibliography ==
- Murnaghan, F.D. (1939). "Obituary". Science. 89 (2309): 283. doi:10.1126/science.89.2309.282. ISSN 1095-9203.
- Parshall, Karen Hunger; Rowe, David E. (1994). The Emergence of the American Mathematical Research Community, 1876–1900. American Mathematical Society. ISBN 978-0-8218-9004-2.
- Rauchway, Eric (2001). "The High Cost of Living in the Progressives' Economy". Journal of American History. 88 (3): 898–924. doi:10.2307/2700392. ISSN 0021-8723. JSTOR 2700392.
- Walton, Andrea (2014). "More Valuable Than Even Radium: Christine Ladd-Franklin's Perspective on Intellect and the Life of the Mind". In Linda C. Morice; Laurel Puchner (eds.). Life Stories: Exploring Issues in Educational History Through Biography. Information Age Publishing. pp. 155–176. ISBN 978-1-62396-490-0.
