= Wang Zhenyi (astronomer) =

Chinese astronomer (1768–1797)

- 王贞仪
- Born: 1768
- Died: 1797 (c. aged 29)
- Other names: Jinling Lady Historian, Jiangning Lady Historian
- Occupation: Scientist
- Era: Qing dynasty
- Known for: Contributions to astronomy, mathematics and poetry.

Wang Zhenyi (simplified Chinese: 王贞仪; traditional Chinese: 王貞儀; pinyin: Wáng Zhēnyí; 1768–1797; styled Deqing (德卿)), also known as the Jinling and Jiangning Lady Historian (金陵女史), was a Chinese scientist from the Qing Dynasty. Described as "an extraordinary woman of 18th Century China," she pursued education in several subjects and is known for her contributions to astronomy, mathematics, and poetry.

== Biography ==
Wang's ancestral home was located in the Anhui province. Her grandfather's family later moved to Jiangning (now known as Nanjing).

She was raised by her grandparents and father. Her grandfather Wang Zhefu (王者辅) was a governor of the Fengcheng County and the Xuanhua District. He was an avid reader who maintained a large book collection. Her father, Wang Xichen, failed the imperial examination and turned to studying medical science. He recorded his findings in a four-volume collection titled Yifang Yanchao (Collection of Medical Prescriptions). Wang's grandfather taught her astronomy, her grandmother taught her poetry; whilst her father taught her medicine, geography and mathematics.

From the age of nine, she was taught to write poetry and essays, focusing on the human condition. Her grandfather, Wang Zhefu, died in 1782 and the family traveled to Jilin (close to the Great Wall) for his funeral. Wang, along with grandmother and father, went to mourn outside the Great Wall and lived there for four years, where she studied under the Lady of Bu Qianyao. Here, Zhenyi gained knowledge from reading her grandfather's collection of books, as well as learning equestrian skills, archery, and martial arts from the wife of a Mongolian general named Aa. She lived in Xuanhua Prefecture for five years. Later, she traveled with her grandmother and father to various places, including Beijing, Shaanxi, Hubei, Guangdong, and Anhui. During these journeys, she visited numerous historical sites, gaining extensive experiences and exposure to various aspects of society.

At the age of 16, Wang traveled to the south of the Yangtze river with her father before moving back to the capital. When she was 18, she made friends with female scholars in Jiangning through her poetry and began focusing on her studies in astronomy and mathematics, most of which were self-taught. At age 25, she married Zhan Mei from Xuancheng in Anhui province. After her marriage, she became more well known for her poetry and knowledge of mathematics and astronomy, including teaching some male students. Wang Zhenyi died at 29 years of age and had no children.

== Academic achievements ==
Although she only lived to be 29, Wang Zhenyi contributed to the academic study of astronomy and mathematics. One of her notable works involved outlining her observations on celestial phenomena in her paper Dispute of the Procession of the Equinoxes. She explained how equinoxes move and how to calculate their movements. She commented on the number of stars; the revolving direction of the sun, the moon, and the planets Venus, Jupiter, Mars, Mercury, and Saturn; as well as describing the relationship between lunar and solar eclipses. Wang Zhenyi studied both earlier astronomical texts and carried out her own research. At that time, there were few successors in the field of new astronomical calendrical knowledge. Women also faced strict restrictions on studying calendrical astronomy as it was considered inappropriate for them to pursue such studies in seclusion. Within this restrictive context, she studied both Chinese and Western astronomy and authored several works on the subject. Of her works, only about ten papers, amongst them Explanation of Lunar Eclipses and Explanation of the Starry Sky, have survived.

Her paper The Explanation of the Pythagorean Theorem and Trigonometry focuses on foundational geometric principles, including the Pythagorean theorem.

She admired the mathematician Mei Wending (1633–1721), famous in the early Qing dynasty. Wang Zhenyi became a master of his book, Principles of Calculation, rewriting it with simpler language and making it available to others under the title The Musts of Calculation. She simplified multiplication and division to make learning mathematics easier for beginners. At the age of 24, she wrote a book called The Simple Principles of Calculation.

Wang Zhenyi's Explanation of Lunar Eclipses analyzes the causes of lunar eclipses with theories consistent with modern astronomical principles. In her work, she summarized various astronomical theories from Yu Xi to Guo Shoujing and aligned them with Islamic, Western, and modern calendars. One of her experiments during this study included placing a round table in a garden pavilion, acting as a globe, and a crystal lamp hung on a cord from the ceiling beams, representing the sun. Then, on one side of the table, she placed a round mirror acting as the moon. She moved these three objects as if they were the sun, earth, and moon according to astronomical principles. She addressed misunderstandings about celestial mechanics and discussed the gradual shift in stellar positions.

Wang Zhenyi also clarified concepts of calendrical epochs and methods, differentiating between the starting point of calendar creation and the methods of calculation, including arithmetic, diagrams, and instruments. She argued that changes in calendars across dynasties were about epochs, not methods.

In Theory of the Earth's Roundness, Wang Zhenyi refuted the thousand-year-old concept of a flat earth with a round sky, applying astronomical and geographical terms to advocate for the concept of a spherical Earth and revealing the idea of relative spatial positions.

Wang Zhenyi's contributions to medicine, although not encapsulated in a specific book, are evident in her prefaces to her father's medical works and her practical medical knowledge. She emphasized diagnostic precision, preventive medicine, and bespoke treatment strategies.

== Poetry ==
Her travel experiences, as well as her academic research influenced the content and themes of her poetry. She left thirteen volumes of Ci (poetry), prose, prefaces and postscripts written for other works. Qing dynasty scholar Yuan Mei remarked that Wang's poetry "had the flavor of a great pen, not of a female poet". Her poetry was noted for its direct style, in contrast to the ornamental language then often associated with women's writing. Her poetry included her understanding of classics and history, as well as her experiences during her travels, such as sceneries and the lives of commoners with whom she made acquaintances.

Some examples of her work are:

“Transiting Tong Pass”

So important is the doorway,
occupying the throat of the mountain
Looking down from the heaven,
The sun sees Yellow river streaming

“Climbing Tai Mountain”

Clouds overcast the hills,
The sun bathes in the sea.

Some of her poems addressed the lives of working-class individuals, particularly laboring women, as seen in works such as “Woman Breeder of Silkworm” and “Clothes Washing.” In addition, she portrayed corruption and the polar contrast between the lives of the rich and poor in poems like “A Poem of Eight Lines,” which contained:

Village is empty of cooking smoke,
Rich families let grains stored decay;
In wormwood strewed pitiful starved bodies,
Greedy officials yet push farm levying.

Her poetry has been noted for its straightforward style and engagement with contemporary social themes. Her verses often reflect social realities, shedding light on the conditions and sentiments of her time. She utilized poetry as a medium to express her thoughts on various themes, including the status of women in society, the value of education, and her love for scientific inquiry. Her work is notable for its blend of traditional literary forms with progressive ideas, making her a unique voice in Qing dynasty literature. Though only partially preserved, her poetry offers insight into her intellectual interests and the social concerns of her time.

== Death ==
In the second year of the Jiaqing era (1797), Wang Zhenyi suffered a relapse of malaria and became gravely ill. During her illness, she and her husband, Zhan Quan, reviewed her writings, destroying a significant portion and preserving only 20–30% of her work. Before her death, she entrusted her remaining manuscripts to her husband with instructions to deliver them to Madam Kuai, expressing her wish to be remembered after her death. Her husband, Zhan Quan, died unexpectedly a few years later. As they had no children, Wang entrusted her writing to a trusted friend.

Wang Zhenyi died in 1797 at the age of 29. The exact cause of her death is unknown but most likely due to her illness. Aware of her impending death, she entrusted her works and manuscripts to her close friend Madam Kuai (1763–1827), who later passed them on to her nephew, Qian Yiji (1783–1850), a prominent scholar of the Qing dynasty. Qian Yiji compiled her writings into Shusuan Jiancun (Simple Principles of Calculation) and described Wang Zhenyi as "the number one female scholar after Ban Zhao".

== Legacy ==
During the Qing dynasty, women faced significant barriers to education, particularly in specialised disciplines such as astronomy, mathematics, and medicine. Female scholars in scientific fields, such as Wang Zhenyi, were uncommon in the context of Qing-era society. In the preface to Shusuan Jiancun, Qing scholar Qian Yiji likened her to Ban Zhao, a prominent female scholar of ancient China, praising her intellectual achievements. In addition to her work in the natural sciences, Wang Zhenyi supported women's education and placed strong value on lifelong learning. She expressed concern over the limited educational opportunities available to women and questioned social norms that restricted their academic participation.

Her travels with her father broadened her horizons and deepened her intellectual curiosity, leading her to believe that "one's pursuit of learning knows no bounds, and every moment is precious." Some of her contemporaries, including family members, reportedly dismissed or questioned her scientific interests. Most of her scientific writings have been lost, with only a few general readership works surviving. Wang Zhenyi was known as a multidisciplinary scholar, with interests spanning literature, history, poetry, and astronomy. Much of her education was self-directed. Later scholars have described her as a versatile figure, noting her engagement with both literary and martial arts, as well as her familiarity with Chinese and Western scientific thought.

Wang Zhenyi believed in equality and equal opportunity for both men and women. She wrote in one of her poems:

It's made to believe,
Women are the same as Men;
Are you not convinced,
Daughters can also be heroic?

(Original quote: 始信须眉等巾帼，谁言儿女不英雄)

She believed social feudal values were inappropriate: "when talking about learning and sciences, people thought of no women," she said that "women should only do cooking and sewing, and that they should not be bothered about writing articles for publication, studying history, composing poetry or doing calligraphy." [Men and women] "are all people, who have the same reason for studying."

In 1994, the International Astronomical Union's (IAU) Working Group for Planetary System Nomenclature approved naming a crater on Venus Wang Zhenyi after her.

== See also ==
- Timeline of women in science

== Other sources ==
- "The Preliminary Collection of Defeng Pavilion" by Wang Zhenyi
- The History of the Qing Dynasty, the 508th vol.: The Biography of Wang Zhenyi
- The Biographies of 700 Noted Personages of the Qing Dynasty, Book Four, the biography of Wang Zhenyi by Cai Guanluo
- The Supplementary Collection of Biographies on Stone Tablets: the 509th vol.: The Biography of Wang Zhenyi by Min Erchang
- "The Third Edition of the Biographies, seventh vol., by Zhu Kebao
- "The Preliminary Collection of the Classified Readings of the Dynasty," the 228th vol.
- Textual Research into Works by Women Writers in History, seventh vol., by Hu Wenkai
