= Marymount College (Kansas) =

Former liberal arts college in Salina, Kansas

- Active: 1922–1989
- Affiliations: Sisters of St. Joseph
- Religious affiliation: Roman Catholic
- Location: Salina, Kansas; 38.840836°N 97.576145°W
- Nickname: Trojans
- Sporting affiliations: NCAA Division III – KCAC

Marymount College was a four-year liberal arts college located in Salina, Kansas, that opened in 1922 as a women's college. It was operated by the Sisters of St. Joseph of Concordia, Kansas, and closed in 1989.

== History ==
The college opened in 1922 as a women's college by the Sisters of St. Joseph of Concordia, Kansas. The original college was a three-story building that overlooked the Smoky Hill River. The single building on its 30-acre (12 ha) campus dominated the eastern edge of the city.

The school was accredited by the Higher Learning Commission in 1932. In the 1950s and 1960s, two dormitories and a Fine Arts building were erected. The three dormitories on campus housed 350 resident students. Marymount became coeducational in 1968, which met with mixed reactions from students and faculty. A multi-purpose physical education building was erected in 1971. Basketball coach Ken Cochran was hired for the 1970-71 year and two years after Marymount had begun to admit male full-time students.

Cochran developed a women's program in physical education and built the school into a NAIA powerhouse, racking up a record of 285–56 in eleven seasons. The Marymount team enjoyed a streak of 106 straight home court wins, reached a national ranking in 10 years, and won a third place finale in 1976.

Marymount closed in June 1989, in a year that had an enrollment of 653 students.

The Marymount records and student transcripts have been housed at several institutions since the closure. The student records are now stored at Kansas Wesleyan University. Earlier locations for records included St. Mary of the Plains College and Fort Hays State University in Hays, Kansas.

== Campus use ==
The campus is now used as the Kansas Highway Patrol Training Center and the patrol's statewide dispatch center. The training center had formerly been based at the Salina Municipal Airport.

== Notable people ==
Alumni

- Tyrees Allen - Television and Broadway actor
- Mona Pasquil - Former Lieutenant Governor of California
- Kevin Willmott - Writer and film director

Faculty

- Mary Nicholas Arnoldy, PhD, CSJ - Mathematics professor.
