= Euphemia Haynes =

American mathematician (1890–1980)

Euphemia Lofton Haynes
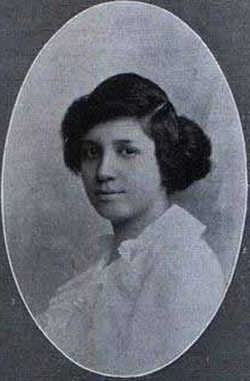
- Born: September 11, 1890; Washington, D.C., United States
- Died: July 25, 1980 (aged 89); Washington, D.C., United States
- Education: University of the District of Columbia, Smith College, University of Chicago, The Catholic University of America
- Scientific career
- Fields: Mathematics
- Thesis: Determination of Sets of Independent Conditions Characterizing Certain Special Cases of Symmetric Correspondences (1943)
- Doctoral advisor: Aubrey Edward Landry

Martha Euphemia Lofton Haynes (September 11, 1890 – July 25, 1980) was an American mathematician and educator. She was the first African American woman to earn a PhD in mathematics, which she earned from the Catholic University of America in 1943.

== Life ==
Euphemia Lofton was the first child and only daughter of William S. Lofton, a dentist and financier, and Lavinia Day Lofton, a kindergarten teacher. She was the valedictorian of M Street High School in 1907 and then graduated from Normal School for Colored Girls, now known as University of the District of Columbia, with distinction and a degree in education in 1909. She went on to earn an undergraduate mathematics major (and psychology minor) from Smith College in 1914. In 1917 she married Harold Appo Haynes, a teacher. The couple had no children. She gained a master's degree in education from the University of Chicago in 1930. In 1943, she gained her PhD from The Catholic University of America with a dissertation, supervised by Aubrey E. Landry, entitled The Determination of Sets of Independent Conditions Characterizing Certain Special Cases of Symmetric Correspondences.

According to archivist and professor Maria Mazzenga, Haynes "contributed quite grandly to the educational system of the District of Columbia." She taught in the public schools of Washington, D.C., for 47 years and in 1966 became the first woman to chair the DC Board of Education, on which she served through 1967. While on the DC Board of Education, she was an outspoken critic of the "track system", which she argued discriminated against African American students by assigning them to tracks that left them unprepared for college. This work contributed towards the filing of Hobson v. Hansen (1967) which led to the end of the track system in DC. She taught first grade at Garrison and Garfield Schools, and mathematics at Armstrong High School. She taught mathematics and served as chair of the Math Department at Dunbar High School. Haynes was a professor of mathematics at the University of the District of Columbia where she was chair of the Division of Mathematics and Business Education, a department she created dedicated to training African American teachers.

She retired in 1959 from the public school system, but went on to establish the mathematics department at the University of the District of Columbia. She also occasionally taught part-time at Howard University. Haynes was involved in many community activities. She served as first vice president of the Archdiocesan Council of Catholic Women, chair of the advisory board of Fides Neighborhood House, on the Committee of International Social Welfare, on the executive committee of the National Social Welfare Assembly, secretary and member of the executive committee of the DC Health and Welfare Council, on the local and national committees of the United Service Organization, a member of the National Conference of Christians and Jews, Catholic Interracial Council of Washington, the National Urban League, NAACP, League of Women Voters, and the American Association of University Women.

== Recognition ==
Pope John XXIII awarded her the Papal Decoration of Honor, Pro Ecclesia et Pontifice, in 1959. She was named a Fellow of the American Association for the Advancement of Science in 1998.

Martha Euphemia Lofton Haynes received numerous accolades throughout her distinguished career, reflecting her groundbreaking contributions to mathematics and education. In addition to the Papal Decoration of Honor, Pro Ecclesia et Pontifice, awarded by Pope John XXIII in 1959, and her recognition as a Fellow of the American Association for the Advancement of Science in 1998, her legacy continues to be celebrated through various honors:

- Honorary Doctorate of Science: In 1975, the University of the District of Columbia awarded Haynes an Honorary Doctorate of Science, acknowledging her exceptional contributions to education and her pioneering role in mathematics.
- Euphemia Lofton Haynes Mathematics Prize: Smith College established this prize in 1996 to honor Haynes' legacy. The prize is awarded annually to a graduating senior who demonstrates excellence in mathematics and a commitment to community service.
- Mathematical Educator Award: In 2001, the American Mathematical Society recognized Haynes with this award, celebrating her significant influence on mathematics education.
- Martha Euphemia Lofton Haynes Fellowship: Initiated in 2010 by the National Association of Mathematicians, this fellowship supports graduate students from underrepresented groups pursuing advanced degrees in mathematics, continuing Haynes' legacy of mentorship and advocacy.

== Legacy ==
Haynes died of a heart attack on July 25, 1980, in her hometown, Washington, D.C. She had set up a trust fund to support a professorial chair and student loan fund in the School of Education, giving $700,000 to Catholic University. Her family papers are housed in the Catholic University archives.

In 2004, the E.L. Haynes Public Charter School in Washington, DC was named in her honor. The Catholic University of America established the Euphemia Lofton Haynes Award to recognize outstanding junior mathematics majors who have demonstrated excellence and promise in their study of mathematics. Her efforts laid the groundwork for more equitable educational practices in the district, ensuring that all students, regardless of race, had the opportunity to pursue academic excellence.

In 2024, Smith College renamed the residential house formerly known as Wilder House to Haynes House to honor its alum.

== Published works ==
- Euphemia Lofton Haynes. The Historical Development of Tests in Elementary and Secondary Mathematics. University of Chicago, Department of Education (1930).
- Euphemia Lofton Haynes. Determination of Sets of Independent Conditions Characterizing Certain Special Cases of Symmetric Correspondences. Catholic University of America Press (1943). 34 pp.

== See also ==
- List of African-American pioneers in desegregation of higher education
