= Amy Shell-Gellasch =

Mathematician

Amy Shell-Gellasch is a mathematician, historian of mathematics, and book author. She has written or edited the books

- Algebra in Context: Introductory Algebra from Origins to Applications (with J. B. Thoo, Johns Hopkins University Press, 2015)
- In Service to Mathematics: The Life and Work of Mina Rees (Docent Press, 2011)
- Mathematical Time Capsules: Historical Modules for the Mathematics Classroom (ed. with Dick Jardine, MAA Notes 77, Mathematical Association of America, 2010)
- Hands on History: A Resource for Teaching Mathematics (ed., MAA Notes 72, Mathematical Association of America, 2007)
- From Calculus to Computers: Using the Last 200 Years of Mathematics History in the Classroom (ed. with Dick Jardine, MAA Notes 68, Mathematical Association of America, 2005)

Her article "The Spirograph & mathematical models from 19th-century Germany" (Math. Horizons 2015) was selected for inclusion in The Best Writing on Mathematics 2016.

Shell-Gellasch earned a doctorate (D.A.) from the University of Illinois at Chicago in 2000, with a dissertation that became her book on Mina Rees. Formerly an associate professor of mathematics at Montgomery College in Maryland, she subsequently became a lecturer in mathematics in the University of Michigan Comprehensive Studies Program.
