= Mary Domitilla Thuener =

American nun and mathematician (1880–1977)

- Born: October 25, 1880; Allegheny, Pennsylvania, U.S.
- Died: September 29, 1977 (aged 96); Covington, Kentucky, U.S.
- Other name: Sister Mary Domitilla
- Education: St. Xavier College; Catholic University of America
- Known for: First dean of Thomas More College

Mary Domitilla Thuener OSB (Eleanor Margaret Thuener, 1880–1977) was a nun and mathematician who served as the first head of Villa Madonna College. She was one of a few women who earned their PhD in math in the U.S. before World War II.

== Early life and education ==
Thuener was born on October 25, 1880, in Allegheny, Pennsylvania to Josephine and August Thuener. Her father was an immigrant from Germany who married an American; they had seven children but only three survived. Eleanor was the oldest. She completed her studies at St. Mary’s Academy in Monroe, Michigan in 1905, took orders as a Benedictine nun, and entered the St. Waldburg convent in Covington, Kentucky, taking the name Mary Domitilla. There she came to work as a teacher in two local Catholic schools.

By taking evening classes at St. Xavier College, Thuener completed a bachelor's degree in 1920. At the time, the Jesuit college for men in Cincinnati, Ohio, did not permit women to study during regular class hours, but nuns from neighboring congregations were allowed to take special extension classes, scheduled for late afternoons, Saturdays, and summers, and in this way, Sister Mary Domitilla earned her bachelor's degree. She went on to complete her master's degree in 1923, at the women's college associated with the Catholic University of America in Washington, D.C.

In 1929, she left her work at Thomas More College for additional study at the Catholic University of America, completing a PhD in 1932 in mathematics and education. Her dissertation, supervised by Aubrey E. Landry, was On the Number and Reality of the Self-Symmetric Quadrilaterals In-and-Circumscribed to the Triangular-Symmetric Rational Quartic.

== Leadership ==
In 1921, the Benedictines of Covington founded Villa Madonna College, later to become Thomas More College. Thuener became its first dean, and also taught mathematics there. In 1929 she left to earn her doctorate. She then returned to Villa Madonna as a mathematics and physics instructor.

In 1943, Sister M. Domitilla was elected by her community to serve as the Prioress of St. Walburg Convent. While she served in that capacity for two successive terms as administrator and religious leader, she also sat on the board of trustees of Villa Madonna College. She directed her community to enter hospital work and took over the administration of a hospital in Kentucky and began staffing a hospital in Colorado. Sister Domitilla was a mentor and facilitator in the education of Sister Elizabeth Frisch, O.S.B., who also obtained a PhD in 1940 from Catholic University and became the head of the mathematics department at Villa Madonna College.

Thuener died at Villa Madonna in Covington, Kentucky, on September 29, 1977.
