= Jeanne LaDuke =

American mathematician (born 1938)

- Born: June 27, 1938 (age 87)
- Education: DePauw University; University of Oregon (PhD)
- Occupation: Mathematician

Alice Jeanne LaDuke (born June 27, 1938) is an American mathematician who specialized in mathematical analysis and the history of mathematics. She was also a child actress who appeared in one film (The Green Promise).

== Early life and film career ==
LaDuke was raised on a farm in Posey County, in southwest Indiana. Her parents were college-educated and an aunt who taught mathematics in Chicago frequently visited, bringing mathematics puzzles for LaDuke.

As a child, she was cast from a field of 12,000 4-H members to play a small part in The Green Promise (1948) as farm girl Jessie Wexford, the sister of Natalie Wood's character's love interest. Wood and LaDuke shared a tutor who taught them both string games as well as their school curriculum.

== Education ==
LaDuke studied mathematics at DePauw University in the 1950s, and roomed with another mathematics major from Oregon, who showed her the state on summer camping trips.

She earned a master's degree in mathematics, but was unable to obtain a teaching position with it because the schools she applied to only hired men. She returned to Oregon in 1966 as a doctoral student at the University of Oregon, and completed her Ph.D. in 1969 with a dissertation in mathematical analysis supervised by Kenneth A. Ross on E_{p} Space: Essentially a Product of C_{p} Spaces.

== Mathematics career ==
After completing her doctorate, LaDuke spent the following thirty years as a faculty member of the department of mathematical sciences at DePaul University. She retired in 2003.

With Judy Green, she is the author of Pioneering Women in American Mathematics: The Pre-1940 PhD’s (American Mathematical Society and London Mathematical Society, 2009). An annual lecture series on Women in Mathematics, Science, and Technology at DePaul is named after her.
