= Judy Green (mathematician) =

American mathematician

- Born: 1943

Academic background
- Education: Cornell University, Yale University
- Alma mater: University of Maryland, College Park
- Thesis: Consistency Properties for Uncountable Finite-Quantifier Languages (1972)
- Doctoral advisor: Carol Karp

Academic work
- Discipline: Mathematics
- Institutions: Rutgers University, Marymount University
- Main interests: Women in mathematics
- Notable works: Women in American Mathematics: The Pre-1940 PhD’s

Judith (Judy) Green (born 1943) is an American logician and historian of mathematics who studies women in mathematics. She is a founding member of the Association for Women in Mathematics; she has also served as its vice president, and as the vice president of the American Association of University Professors.

== Education and career ==
Green earned her bachelor's degree at Cornell University. She completed a master's degree at Yale University, and a Ph.D. at the University of Maryland, College Park. Her dissertation, supervised by Carol Karp and finished in 1972, was Consistency Properties for Uncountable Finite-Quantifier Languages.

Green was elected an AMS Member at Large in 1975 and served for three years until 1977. She belonged to the faculty of Rutgers University before moving to Marymount University in 1989. After retiring from Marymount in 2007, she became a volunteer at the National Museum of American History.

== Book ==
With Jeanne LaDuke, she wrote Pioneering Women in American Mathematics: The Pre-1940 PhD’s (American Mathematical Society and London Mathematical Society, 2009). This was a biographical study of the first women in the U.S. to earn doctorates in mathematics.

== Recognition ==
She is part of the 2019 class of fellows of the Association for Women in Mathematics.
