= List of African-American women in STEM fields =

The following is a list of notable African-American women who have made contributions to the fields of science, technology, engineering, and mathematics.

An excerpt from a 1998 issue of Black Issues in Higher Education by Juliane Malveaux reads: "There are other reasons to be concerned about the paucity of African-American women in science, especially as scientific occupations are among the most pivotal and highly compensated in the occupational spectrum. Yet, both leaks in the pipeline and gender stereotyping contribute to the under-representation of African-American women in the sciences.

There are organizations that offer scholarships in STEM in the hopes of attracting more women and minority candidates, like Ralph W. Turner Foundation and UNCF STEM Scholarships for undergraduate education, however many students remain unaware of their availability. The US National Science Foundation also makes efforts to support women in STEM.

== A ==
Image	Name	Field(s)	Dates	Notes	Ref.
	Kandis Leslie Abdul-Aziz	chemical engineer and environmental engineer		Developer of technologies that turn agricultural waste into a filtration system for water	
	Rediet Abebe	computer scientist	1991–	First female computer scientist to be appointed to the Harvard Society of Fellows	
	Lilia Ann Abron	chemical engineering and environmental engineering	1945–	First African-American woman to earn a PhD in chemical engineering	
	Stephanie G. Adams	engineer and academic administrator		Dean of the Erik Jonsson School of Engineering and Computer Science at the University of Texas at Dallas since 2019	
	Lucile Adams-Campbell	epidemiology	1953–	First African-American woman to receive a PhD in epidemiology in the United States. Serves as the Professor of Oncology at Lombardi Comprehensive Cancer Center and associate director for Minority Health at the Georgetown University Medical Center.	
	Javaune Adams-Gaston	psychologist and academic administrator		President of Norfolk State University since 2019.	
	Paris Adkins-Jackson	epidemiology		Assistant Professor of Epidemiology and Sociomedical Sciences in the Mailman School of Public Health at Columbia University in New York.	
	Modupe Akinola	organizational scholar and social psychologist	1974–	Researches the science of stress, creativity, and how to maximize human potential in diverse organizations.	
	Jacqueline Akinpelu	applied mathematician, operations researcher	1953–	Research manager at the Applied Physics Laboratory of Johns Hopkins University, and developed a pipeline for students from Morgan State University to mentor them into careers in STEM fields.	
	Delores P. Aldridge	sociologist	1941–	First African-American woman faculty member of Emory University and founding director of the first African-American and African-Studies degree-granting program in the South.	
	Claudia Alexander	geophysics, planetary science	1959–2015	Project manager for NASA's Galileo mission and Rosetta mission	
	Beverly Anderson	mathematician	1943–	Emeritus professor at the University of the District of Columbia, and in the 1990s, worked at the National Academy of Sciences as Director of Minority Programs for the Mathematical Sciences Education Board	
	Cheryl Anderson	epidemiologist		Professor at and founding Dean of the University of California San Diego Herbert Wertheim School of Public Health and Human Longevity Science	
	Giovonnae Anderson	electrical engineering		First African-American women to earn a PhD in electrical engineering at the University of California, Davis (1979): Giovonnae Anderson	
	Gloria Long Anderson	chemistry	1938–	Pioneer of nuclear magnetic resonance spectroscopy, known for work with fluorine-19 and solid rocket propellants	
	Ayana Holloway Arce	physicist and professor		Associate professor of Duke University who works on particle physics, using data from the Large Hadron Collider to understand phenomena beyond the Standard Model	
	Treena Livingston Arinzeh	biomedical engineering	1970–	Researcher of adult stem-cell therapy	
	Ludmilla Aristilde	engineer		Professor at Northwestern University whose research considers environmental biochemistry and bioengineering	
	Elayne Arrington	mathematician and engineer	1940–	First African-American woman to graduate with a bachelor's degree from the School of Engineering at the University of Pittsburgh	
	Valerie Ashby	chemist		Chemist and university professor currently serving as president of the University of Maryland, Baltimore County	
	Estella Atekwana	Biogeophysics; tectonphysics	1961–	In August 2021 began tenure as dean of the largest college of the University of California, Davis: UC Davis College of Letters and Science	
	Balanda Atis	cosmetic science		Cosmetic chemist at L'Oréal USA who expanded range of cosmetics available for people of color	
	Donna Auguste	businesswoman, computer scientist	1958–	Senior engineering manager for the Newton personal digital assistant (PDA)	
	Wanda Austin	aerospace engineering	1954–	Former president and CEO of The Aerospace Corporation	

== B ==
Image	Name	Field(s)	Dates	Notes	Ref.
	Aziza Baccouche	physicist and science filmmaker	1972–2021	American Association for the Advancement of Science (AAAS) Mass Media Science and Engineering fellow at CNN and founder and CEO of media company Aziza Productions	
	Erica Baker	software engineer	1980–	Chief Technology Officer for the Democratic Congressional Campaign Committee	
	Janet Emerson Bashen	entrepreneur, business consultant, and software inventor	1957–	First African-American woman to earn a web-based software patent	
	June Bacon-Bercey	meteorology	1928–2019	Believed to be the first African-American woman to gain a degree in meteorology and known to be the first African-American woman to be a televised meteorologist.	
	Erica Baker	software engineer		Engineer and engineering manager in the San Francisco Bay Area, known for her outspoken support of diversity and inclusion.	
	Alice Augusta Ball	chemistry	1892–1916	First woman and African-American to receive a master's degree from the University of Hawaiʻi	
	Martha Banks	clinical psychologist	1951–	Expert on issues involving women, race, trauma, disability, religion, and their intersectionality. Banks is a research neuropsychologist and computer programmer at ABackans DCP Inc.	
	Nina Banks	economist		Associate professor of economics at Bucknell University and former president of the National Economic Association (NEA)	
	Gilda Barabino	biomedical engineer and chemical engineer	1956–	Professor of biomedical and chemical engineering, Barabino served as the second president of Olin College of Engineering from 2020 to 2025	
	Patricia Bath	ophthalmologist, inventor	1942–2019	Pioneered laser surgery to remove cataracts	
	Scarlett Bellamy	mathematician		Chair and Professor of Biostatistics at Boston University School of Public Health	
	Regina Benjamin	physician	1956–	18th Surgeon General of the United States (2009–2013)	
	Emma Benn	biostatistician		Associate professor in the Department of Population Health Science, affiliated with the Center for Biostatistics and the associate dean of faculty well-being and development, and the founding director of the Center for Scientific Diversity at the Icahn School of Medicine at Mount Sinai	
	Adia Benton	anthropologist	1977–	Associate professor of anthropology and African Studies at Northwestern University	
	Angela Benton	internet entrepreneur	1981–	Founder of NewME, Streamlytics, and Black Web 2.0	
	Joanne Berger-Sweeney	neuroscientist	1958–	First woman and the first African American to lead Trinity College (Connecticut)	
	Marie Bernard	physician and researcher		Previously, NIH senior geriatrician, overseeing research focused on aging and Alzheimer's disease	
	Carlotta Berry	electrical engineer, professor, roboticist		Professor of electrical and computer engineering at Rose-Hulman Institute of Technology and textbook author	
	Matilene Berryman	oceanographer, lawyer	1920–2003	Professor of marine science at the University of the District of Columbia and textbook author	
	Sarah Boone	inventor	1832–1904	Second African-American woman to attain a U.S. patent	
	Katie Booth	biomedical chemist and civil rights activist	1907–2006	Worked in the Department of Pharmacology at the Chicago Medical School (part of Rosalind Franklin University of Medicine and Science), specializing in preventative health measures, children's health, prenatal care, and treatments for sickle cell anemia	
	Maudelle Bousfield	educator	1885–1971	First African-American woman to graduate from the University of Illinois Urbana-Champaign (graduated with honors in three years with degrees in astronomy and mathematics)	
	Aisha Bowe	aerospace engineer and STEM advocate	1986–	Founder and CEO of STEMBoard, a technology company, and LINGO, an educational tech company featuring tutorials and online resources featuring NASCAR driver Bubba Wallace.	
	Jasmine Bowers	computer scientist		In 2020 the first African-American woman to earn a PhD in computer science from the University of Florida.	
	Sylvia D. Trimble Bozeman	mathematician	1947–	Researcher of functional analysis and image processing, member of Obama's Presidential Committee on the National Medal of Science, founder of Enhancing Diversity in Graduate Education	
	Lillian K. Bradley	mathematician and mathematics educator	1921–1995	First African-American woman to earn a doctorate in any subject (mathematics education) at the University of Texas at Austin	
	Khalia Braswell	computer scientist	2014–present	Computer scientist, educator, and technologist. Founder and Former Executive Director of INTech Camp for Girls	
	Carolyn Brooks	microbiologist	1946–	Researcher in immunology, nutrition, and crop productivity	
	Meredith Broussard	data journalism professor		Researcher focused on the role of artificial intelligence (AI) in journalism	
	Beth A. Brown	astrophysicist	1969–2008	NASA astrophysicist with a research focus on X-ray observations of elliptical galaxies and black holes. She earned a PhD in Astronomy from the University of Michigan in 1998, becoming the first African-American woman to do so.	
	Deborah Washington Brown	computer scientist and speech recognition	1952–2020	First African-American woman to earn a doctorate in computer science (then a part of their applied math program) at Harvard University	
	Dorothy Lavinia Brown	surgeon	1919–2004	First African-American female appointed to a general surgery residency in the racially segregated South.	
	Jeannette Brown	organic medicinal chemist, historian, and author	1934–	First African-American woman to achieve a master's degree from the University of Minnesota in organic chemistry	
	Quincy K. Brown	computer scientist		Director of Engagement and Research at AnitaB.org, a global nonprofit organization whose primary aim is to recruit, retain, and advance women in technology. Senior Fellow at Federation of American Scientists. Formerly Senior Policy Advisor in the White House Office of Science and Technology Policy.	
	Marjorie Lee Browne	mathematician	1914–1979	Third African-American woman to receive a PhD in mathematics	
	Amanda Bryant-Friedrich	chemist		Dean of the graduate school and a professor in the college of pharmacy and health sciences at Wayne State University	
	Kimberly Bryant	electrical engineer	1967–	Founder of Black Girls Code	
	Joy Buolamwini	computer scientist	1989–	Founder of Algorithmic Justice League; Rhodes Scholar, Fulbright fellow, Stamps Scholar, Astronaut Scholar and Anita Borg Institute scholar	
	Ursula Burns	engineer, CEO	1958–	CEO of Xerox; first Black woman to be a CEO of a Fortune 500 company and the first woman to succeed another as head of a Fortune 500 company	
	Angle Bush	CEO		CEO Black Women In Artificial Intelligence; Founded by Angle Bush in August 2020 Black Women In AI™ is a professional membership organization dedicated to the vision of Educating, Engaging, Embracing and Empowering Black Women In the Artificial Intelligence sector. With members on 5 continents BWIAI™ is providng access and opportunity to a global community.	

== C ==
Image	Name	Field(s)	Dates	Notes	Ref.
	Naiomi Cameron	mathematician and combinatorics		Associate professor at Spelman College as well as the vice president of National Association of Mathematicians	
	Alexa Canady	neuroscience	1950–	First Black woman to become a neurosurgeon (1981)	
	Carolyn Cannon-Alfred	pharmacologist	1934–1987	Professor and co-author of Medical Handbook for the Layman in 1969	
	Peggy G. Carr	developmental psychology and statistics		First African American to be appointed Commissioner of the National Center for Education Statistics	
	April Carson	epidemiologist		Associate professor of epidemiology and associate dean for diversity, equity, and inclusion at the University of Alabama at Birmingham School of Public Health	
	Majora Carter	developer, activist	1966–	Founder of Sustainable South Bronx	
	Hattie Carwell	physicist	1948–	Former scientist with the United States Department of Energy and the International Atomic Energy Agency	
	Etosha Cave	mechanical engineering		Co-founder and Chief Scientific Officer of Twelve, a startup that recycles carbon dioxide	
	Sherita Ceasar	mechanical engineering		First African-American president of the Society of Women Engineers (SWE)	
	Karen Chin	paleontologist and taphonomist		Considered one of the world's leading experts in coprolites	
	May Edward Chinn	physician	1896–1980	First African-American woman to graduate from University and Bellevue Hospital Medical College, the first African-American woman to intern at Harlem Hospital; she promoted cancer-screening methods at the Strang Cancer Clinic for 29 years	
	Gloria Chisum	experimental psychologist	1930–	Developed eye protection for pilots; first African-American woman to join the University of Pennsylvania Board of Trustees	
	Juanita Christensen	government official and electronics engineer		First African-American woman from Redstone Arsenal, Alabama to join the Senior Executive Service SES.	
	Mamie Phipps Clark	social psychologist	1917–1983	Researched self-esteem and self-concept in African-American children, which was used in 1954 civil rights case Brown v. Board of Education of Topeka Kansas	
	Yvonne Clark	engineer	1929–2019	First woman to get a Bachelor of Science degree in mechanical engineering at Howard University, the first woman to earn a Master's Degree in Engineering management from Vanderbilt University, and the first woman to serve as a faculty member in the College of Engineering and Technology at Tennessee State University	
	Jewel Plummer Cobb	biologist, professor	1924–2017	Elected to the Institute of Medicine in the National Academy of Sciences in 1974 in recognition for her research achievements	
	Anna Coble	biophysicist	1936–2009	First black woman to earn a doctorate in biophysics, and the first black woman to be hired at Howard University	
	Robin Coger	biomedical engineer and academic administrator		Formerly the provost and senior vice chancellor for academic affairs at East Carolina University. Her research as a biomedical engineer has focused on artificial organs and particularly on liver support systems	
	Johnnetta Cole	anthropologist, educator and museum director	1936–	Spelman College's seventh president and the first Black woman to lead the institution	
	Rebecca Cole	physician	1846–1922	Second African-American woman physician	
	Bessie Coleman	aviator	1896–1926	First African American and Native American woman to hold a pilot license	
	Betty Collette	veterinary pathologist	1930–2017	Sole African-American pathology researcher at Georgetown University School of Medicine in the 1950s	
	Margaret S. Collins	zoologist	1922–1996	First African-American female entomologist and the third African-American female zoologist	
	Kizzmekia Corbett	viral immunologist	1986–	Assistant Professor of Immunology and Infectious Diseases at Harvard T.H. Chan School of Public Health and the Shutzer Assistant Professor at the Harvard Radcliffe Institute since June 2021	
	Carol Blanche Cotton	psychologist	1904–1971	Researched cognitive ability in children diagnosed with spastic paralysis	
	Carla Cotwright-Williams	mathematician	1973–	Second African-American woman to earn a doctorate in mathematics at the University of Mississippi	
	Patricia S. Cowings	aerospace psychophysiologist	1948–	First African-American woman scientist to be trained as an astronaut by NASA	
	Marian Croak	engineer	1955–	Engineer known for her Voice over IP (VoIP) related inventions. In 2022, she was inducted into the National Inventors Hall of Fame for her work with VoIP	
	Monica Cox	engineering education		First African-American woman to earn tenure in engineering at Purdue University	
	Rebecca Lee Crumpler	physician	1831–1895	First African-American woman to become a physician in the United States	
	Lesia L. Crumpton-Young	engineer and academic administrator		Served as the 13th president of Texas Southern University from 2021 to 2023. Previously provost and chief academic officer of Morgan State University	

== D ==
Image	Name	Field(s)	Dates	Notes	Ref.
	Shaundra Daily	electrical engineer and computer science	1979–	American professor and author known for her work in the field of human-centered computing and broadening participation in STEM. She is a professor in the Department of Electrical and Computer Engineering and Computer Science at Duke University.	
	Marie Maynard Daly	biochemist	1921–2003	First African-American woman to earn a PhD in chemistry	
	Theda Daniels-Race	nanoengineering, electronic engineering		Michael B. Voorhies Distinguished Professor in the Division of Electrical and Computer Engineering at Louisiana State University, 19th African-American woman to obtain a PhD in a physics-related field in the US	
	Christine Darden	aerospace engineer	1942–	Researcher at NASA who pioneered the design of supersonic aircraft	
	Geraldine Claudette Darden	mathematician	1936–????	14th African-American woman to earn a PhD in mathematics	
	Jane Eleanor Datcher	botanist	1868–1934	First known African-American woman to earn an undergraduate degree from Cornell University and the first African-American woman in the U.S. to earn a degree in botany (1890)	
	Felecia Davis	architect, engineer and educator		Principal of FELECIA DAVIS STUDIO where she bridges art, engineering, design and architecture. Davis is known for her work in computational textiles.	
	Mary Deconge	mathematician	1933–2025	15th African-American woman to earn her PhD in mathematics	
	Giovonnae Dennis	electrical engineer		One of the first African-American women to earn a PhD in electrical engineering, and one of the few at a primarily white institution rather than a historically Black institution (HBCU); Founded Software Tailoring	
	Elaine Denniston	Keypunch operator, lawyer	1939–	Supported the Apollo program as a keypunch operator	
	Helen Octavia Dickens	physician	1909–2001	First African-American woman to be admitted to the American College of Surgeons (1950)	
	Tawanna Dillahunt	computer scientist and information scientist		Researcher whose research has been cited over 6,000 times, according to Google Scholar	
	Darlene Dixon	veterinary scientist and toxicologic pathologist		Researches the pathogenesis/carcinogenesis of tumors	
	Tabbetha Dobbins	physicist		Investigates the relationship between structure and dynamics in composite materials using neutron and X-ray scattering with applications to modern engineering problems in carbon nanotubes, gold nanoparticles, the hydrogen fuel economy and polymer self-assembly	
	Oluwami Dosunmu-Ogunbi	roboticist, engineer, and educator		In 2024, first African-American woman to earn a PhD in Robotics from the University of Michigan	
	Tracy Drain	flight systems engineer	1954–	Deputy chief engineer for NASA's JUNO mission, which arrived at Jupiter in June 2016	
	Georgia Mae Dunston	Human Geneticist	1944–	Professor at Howard University and founding director of the National Human Genome Center	
	Lisa Dyson	scientist, physicist, and entrepreneur		Founder and CEO of Air Protein, a food tech company, reinventing how food is produced using elements of the air	

== E ==
Image	Name	Field(s)	Dates	Notes	Ref.
	Annie Easley	mathematician and rocket scientist	1933–2011	Leading member of the software development team for the Centaur rocket stage, and one of the first African Americans to work at NASA	
	Ranthony Edmonds	mathematician		Postdoctoral fellow in the department of mathematics at the Ohio State University specializing in commutative ring theory, factorization theory, and applied algebraic topology	
	Cecile H. Edwards	nutritionist	1926–2005	Researcher focused on improving nutrition and well-being of disadvantaged people	
	Joycelyn Elders	pediatrician	1933–	Second woman, second person of color, and first African American to serve as Surgeon General	
	Lola Eniola-Adefeso	chemical engineer		Co-founder and chief scientific officer of Asalyxa Bio, researcher of biocompatible functional particles for targeted drug delivery	
	Anna Epps	microbiologist	1930–	First female dean of the School of Medicine at Meharry Medical College, possibly the first African-American woman with a PhD to lead a medical school	
	Jeanette J. Epps	astronaut and aerospace engineer	1970–	Second woman and first African-American woman to have participated in CAVES	
	Aprille Ericsson-Jackson	aerospace engineer	1963–	First African-American woman to receive a PhD in mechanical engineering from Howard University and the first African-American woman to receive a PhD in Engineering at the National Aeronautics and Space Administration (NASA) Goddard Space Flight Center	
	Carol Espy-Wilson	electrical engineer	c. 1957–	First African-American woman to get a PhD in Electrical Engineering from Massachusetts Institute of Technology (MIT), first African-American faculty to have tenure in the Department of Electrical and Computer Engineering at the University of Maryland in 2001, and first African-American full professor in Electrical and Computer Engineering in 2007.	
	Jessica Esquivel	physicist and science communicator		Works at the Muon g-2 particle physics experiment at Fermilab	
	Christina Eubanks-Turner	mathematics education		Research includes graph theory, commutative algebra, mathematics education, and mathematical sciences diversification	
	Brittney Exline	software engineer		Youngest African-American female to be accepted into an Ivy League school, at 15; United States' youngest African-American engineer	
	Cassandra Extavour	evolutionary biologist		Director of EDEN, a national research collaborative encouraging use of non- Drosophila model organisms	

== F ==
Image	Name	Field(s)	Dates	Notes	Ref.
	Etta Zuber Falconer	mathematician	1933–2002	One of the earlier African-American women to receive a PhD in mathematics	
	Angella D. Ferguson	pediatrician	1925–2026	Pioneer researcher of sickle cell disease, created the blood test which is still used as the standard for sickle cell detection at birth	
	Evelyn J. Fields	oceanographer	1949–????	Fields was the first woman, and first African American to head the NOAA Corps, first woman and first African American to command a NOAA ship, and the first woman to command a ship in the United States uniformed services for an extended assignment	
	Stacey Finley	chemical engineering and materials science		Nichole A. and Thuan Q. Pham Professor and professor of biomedical engineering, chemical engineering and materials science, and quantitative biology and computational biology at the University of Southern California	
	Njema Frazier	nuclear physicist	1974–????	Nuclear physicist at the National Nuclear Security Administration, former staff member for the Committee on Science at the U.S. House of Representatives	
	A. Oveta Fuller	virologist	1955–2022	Researcher who significantly advanced knowledge of Herpes simplex virus	

== G ==
Image	Name	Field(s)	Dates	Notes	Ref.
	Annie Marie Garraway	mathematician and philanthropist	1940–	After earning a Ph.D. in mathematics, Garraway enjoyed a successful career at AT&T Labs and its spinoff company, Lucent Technologies	
	Sadie Gasaway	mathematician	1916–1976	Fifth African-American woman to earn a Ph.D. in mathematics, and the first African American to earn a Ph.D. in mathematics from Cornell University.	
	Florence S. Gaynor	nurse and hospital administrator	1920–1993	First African-American woman to head a major teaching hospital in the United States	
	Timnit Gebru	computer scientist	1983–	Founder of the Distributed Artificial Intelligence Research Institute (DAIR), researcher of algorithmic bias and data mining	
	Lisa Gelobter	computer scientist	1971–	Credited with developing the animation technology used to create GIFs. Chief Digital Service Officer for the United States Department of Education during President Barack Obama's administration.	
	Gloria Ford Gilmer	mathematician	1928–2021	First African-American woman to publish a non-PhD thesis	
	Martha Gilmore	planetary geologist	1972–	George I. Seney Professor of Geology and Director of Graduate Studies at Wesleyan University	
	Sherita Hill Golden	physician, scientist		Researcher of endocrine risk factors associated with the development of diabetes and cardiovascular disease	
	Sarah E. Goode	inventor	1855–1905	One of the first known African-American women to receive a United States patent	
	Loney Gordon	chemist	1915–1999	Bacteriological virulence researcher that led to a pertussis vaccine in 1942, an effective protection against whooping cough developed in Grand Rapids, Michigan, with doctors Pearl Kendrick and Grace Eldering	
	Christine Grant	chemical engineer		2022 President of the American Institute of Chemical Engineers and the Associate Dean of Faculty Advancement at North Carolina State University	
	Evelyn Boyd Granville	mathematician, computer science	1924–2023	Performed pioneering work in the field of computing	
	Michelle Gray	neuroscientist		Professor of neurology and neurobiology at the University of Alabama Birmingham researching the biological basis of Huntington's disease (HD)	
	Hadiyah-Nicole Green	medical physicist	1981–	Known for the development of a method using laser-activated nanoparticles as a potential cancer treatment.	
	Bettye Washington Greene	chemist	1935–1995	First African-American female PhD chemist to work in a professional position at the Dow Chemical Company, considered an early African American pioneer in science	
	Willetta Greene-Johnson	physics and chemistry lecturer	1957–	One of the first African-American women to complete a PhD degree in theoretical physics and a Grammy award-winning musician for her song "Saved" (2004)	
	Eliza Ann Grier	physician	1864–1902	First African American woman licensed to practice medicine in the U.S. state of Georgia	
	Margaret Grigsby	physician	1923–2009	First African American woman to become a fellow of the American College of Physicians and the first woman to preside over a major medical division at Howard University Hospital	
	Bessie Blount Griffin	physical therapist, inventor	1914–2009	Holder of multiple patents for assistive devices for amputees, including the first electric device for self-feeding	
	Theanne Griffith	neuroscientist and children's book author		Assistant professor of Physiology and Membrane Biology at the University of California, Davis	

== H ==
Image	Name	Field(s)	Dates	Notes	Ref.
	Sossina M. Haile	materials scientist	1966–	Developed the first solid acid fuel cells	
	Clara W. Hall	chemist	1930–2014	Research chemist at the National Institutes of Health from 1959 to 1999	
	Cynthia Hall	nuclear scientist	1922/3? – ?	Worked on the Manhattan Project at the Argonne National Laboratory, where she was one of the few female African American scientists assigned to the project.	
	Paula T. Hammond	Chemical Engineer	1963–	Koch Professor of Engineering, Department Head of Chemical Engineering, Koch Institute of Integrative Cancer Research, MIT	
	Evelynn M. Hammonds	History of science	1953–	In 2008, first African-American and the first woman to be appointed dean of Harvard College and was the 4th black woman to receive tenure within the Faculty of Arts and Sciences at Harvard University	
	Betty Harris	chemist	1940–	Patented a spot test for detecting TATB in the field, still used by the Federal Department of Homeland Security to screen for nitroaromatic explosives	
	Mary Styles Harris	geneticist	1949–	one of the first African Americans to enroll at Miami Jackson High School; one of the first women to enroll at Lincoln University; founder of BioTechnical Communications	
	J'Tia Hart	nuclear engineer and television personality	1981–	Chief Science Officer for National and Homeland Security at the Idaho National Laboratory and competed on Survivor: Cagayan	
	Alma Levant Hayden	chemist	1927–1967	one of the first African-American women to gain a scientist position at a science agency (The NIH) in Washington, D.C.; may have been the first African-American scientist at the FDA; led the team that exposed the common substance in Krebiozen	
	Linda B. Hayden	mathematics education and applications of mathematics in geoscience	1949–	Professor and associate dean of mathematics and computer science at Elizabeth City State University	
	Euphemia Lofton Haynes	mathematician	1890–1980	First African-American woman to earn a PhD in Mathematics	
	Ruby Puryear Hearn	biophysicist	1940–	Researcher and advocate for maternal, infant, and child health; AIDS; substance abuse; and minority medical education	
	Gloria Conyers Hewitt	mathematician	1935–	4th African-American woman to receive a PhD in mathematics; first African American woman to chair a math department in the United States	
	Joan Higginbotham	electrical engineer and former NASA astronaut	1964–	Third African-American woman to go into space, after Mae Jemison and Stephanie Wilson	
	Raegan Higgins	mathematician		Co-director of the EDGE program for Women Also one of the co-founders of the website Mathematically Gifted & Black, which highlights the accomplishments of Black mathematicians	
	Mary Elliott Hill	chemist	1907–1969	Believed to be one of the first African-American women to be awarded with a master's degree in chemistry	
	Felicia Hill-Briggs	social scientist and behavioral scientist	1965–2023	Diabetes behavioral scientist who was diagnosed with type 1 diabetes at age 9	
	Jane Hinton	veterinarian	1919–2003	pioneer in the study of bacterial antibiotic resistance and one of the first two African-American women to gain the degree of Doctor of Veterinary Medicine; co-developed the Mueller–Hinton agar	
	Brenda Swann Holmes	chemist		Appointed to the National Research Council to perform chemical research at the U. S. Naval Research Laboratory (NRL) studying nuclear magnetic resonance techniques	
	Dorothy Evans Holmes	psychoanalyst and psychotherapist	1943–	Psychoanalytic thinker known for her work on racial and cultural trauma	
	Esther A. H. Hopkins	chemist, lawyer	1926–2021	Best known for her career as a biophysicist and research chemist at American Cyanamid along with research in the Polaroid Corp Emulsion Coating and Analysis Laboratory	
	K. Renee Horton	physicist		First African American to receive a PhD in material science and engineering with a concentration in physics at the University of Alabama	
	Ayanna Howard	roboticist	1972–	The first woman to lead the Ohio State University College of Engineering	
	Ruth Winifred Howard	psychologist	1900–1997	One of the first African American women to earn a PhD in Psychology	
	Rebecca Hubbard	biostatistician		Research interests include observational studies and the use of electronic health record data in public health analysis and decision-making, accounting for the errors in this type of data	
	Jacqueline Hughes-Oliver	statistician		Retired professor of the Statistics Department of North Carolina State University (NCSU)	
	Fern Hunt	mathematician	1948–	Leader in applied mathematics and mathematical biology research	
	Louise Stokes Hunter	mathematics educator	−1988	First African-American woman to earn a degree at the University of Virginia (1953)	
	Yasmin Hurd	neuroscientist		Researcher of neurological effects of cannabis and heroin	
	Nola Hylton	oncologist	1957–	Pioneered the usage of magnetic resonance imaging for the detection, diagnosis, and staging of breast cancer by using MRIs to locate tumors and characterize the surrounding tissue	

== I ==
Image	Name	Field(s)	Dates	Notes	Ref.
	Folami Ideraabdullah	geneticist		Associate professor in the Department of Genetics and the Department of Nutrition at the Gillings School of Global Public Health at the University of North Carolina at Chapel Hill	
	Nia Imara	astrophysicist and artist		First African-American woman to earn a PhD in astrophysics at the University of California, Berkeley	
	Tasha Inniss	mathematician		Vice provost for research at Spelman College	
	Jedidah Isler	astrophysicist		First African-American woman to complete her PhD in astrophysics at Yale University (2014); member of Joe Biden's presidential transition Agency Review Team; founder of Vanguard: Conversations with Women of Color in STEM (VanguardSTEM)	

== J ==
Image	Name	Field(s)	Dates	Notes	Ref.
	Deborah J. Jackson	aeronautical engineer		First African American woman to receive a PhD in physics from Stanford University	
	Fatimah Jackson	biological anthropologist		Researcher of human-plant co-evolution and anthropological genetics; first African-American to receive the Charles R. Darwin Lifetime Achievement Award	
	Lisa P. Jackson	chemical engineer	1962–	Served as the administrator of the United States Environmental Protection Agency (EPA) from 2009 to 2013. She was the first African American to hold that position	
	Mary Jackson	mathematician and aerospace engineer	1921–2005	Mathematician and aerospace engineer at the National Advisory Committee for Aeronautics (NACA), which in 1958 was succeeded by the National Aeronautics and Space Administration (NASA)	
	Monica C. Jackson	statistician and academic administrator		Deputy provost and dean of faculty at American University. Her research focuses on spatial statistics and disease monitoring	
	Shirley Ann Jackson	physicist	1946–	President of Rensselaer Polytechnic Institute; first African-American woman to have earned a doctorate at MIT; second African-American woman in the United States to earn a doctorate in physics	
	Trachette Jackson	mathematician	1972–	Professor of mathematics at the University of Michigan and is known for work in mathematical oncology	
	Chavonda Jacobs-Young	paper scientist	1967–	First African-American woman to earn a PhD in paper science	
	Mary James	physicist and educator		Dean for Institutional Diversity and the A. A. Knowlton Professor of Physics at Reed College; Specializes in particle physics and accelerators	
	Mae Jemison	astronaut and physician	1956–	First African American woman to travel in space	
	Allene Johnson	chemist	1933–	Educational advisor for the New Jersey American Chemical Society	
	Ashanti Johnson	geochemist and oceanographer		First African American to earn a doctoral degree in oceanography from Texas A&M University	
	Ayana Elizabeth Johnson	marine biologist	1980 or 1981–	Co-founder of Urban Ocean Lab, a think tank for ocean-climate policy in coastal cities, and the Roux Distinguished Scholar at Bowdoin College.	
	Katherine Johnson	mathematician	1918–2020	calculated the trajectories for many NASA missions, including Apollo 11; one of the first African-American women to work as a NASA scientist	
	Marian Johnson-Thompson	virologist	1946–	Formerly professor at the University of the District of Columbia. She was elected Fellow of the American Association for the Advancement of Science (AAAS)	
	Sandra Johnson	electrical engineering		First African-American woman to earn a doctorate in electrical engineering at Rice University	
	Tracy L. Johnson	molecular and cell biologist		Researcher of gene regulation, chromatin modification, RNA splicing	
	Anna Johnson Julian	sociologist	1903–1994	First African-American woman awarded a PhD in sociology by the University of Pennsylvania	
	Angie Jones	computer scientist, software engineer and automation architect		Software engineer with 26 patents in the United States and China	
	Chonnettia Jones	geneticist and developmental biologist		Served as the executive director of the non-profit Addgene since 2022. Jones was previously the vice president of research at the Michael Smith Foundation for Health Research and the director of Insight & Analysis at the non-profit Wellcome Trust	
	Eleanor Jones	mathematician	1929–2021	One of the first African-American women to achieve a PhD in mathematics, and encouraged women and minorities to pursue careers in science and mathematics	
	Elva Jones	computer scientist		Professor and founding chair of the Department of Computer Science at Winston-Salem State University (WSSU), a position she has held since 1991	
	Lataisia Jones	neuroscientist		Scientific Research Officer (SRO) in the Scientific Review Branch (SRB) at the National Institute of Neurological Disorders and Stroke (NINDS)	
	Shelly M. Jones	mathematics educator	1964–	Associate professor of mathematics education at Central Connecticut State University	
	Stacey Franklin Jones	computer scientist and academic administrator		Fifth chancellor of Elizabeth City State University from 2014 to 2015	
	Lynda Marie Jordan	biochemist	1956–	Third Black woman to receive a PhD from the Massachusetts Institute of Technology	

== K ==
Image	Name	Field(s)	Dates	Notes	Ref.
	Sinah Estelle Kelley	chemist	1916–1982	Worked on mass production of penicillin	
	Mary Beatrice Davidson Kenner	inventor	1912–2006	Holder of five patents, including the adjustable sanitary belt	
	Chawne Kimber	mathematician	1971–	Vice president for academic affairs and dean of faculty at Pitzer College	
	Angie Turner King	chemist, mathematician, and educator	1905–2004	First African-American woman to earn a PhD in mathematics education (University of Pittsburgh, 1955) and professor of chemistry and mathematics at West Virginia State College	
	Emeline King	automotive designer	1957–	Former automotive designer for Ford Motor Company (1983–2008), author	
	Karen D. King	mathematics educator	1971–2019	Mathematics educator, program director at National Science Foundation and a 2012 AWM/MAA Falconer Lecturer	
	Reatha King	chemistry	1938–	Former vice president of the General Mills Corporation; the former president, executive director, and chairman of the board of trustees of the General Mills Foundation	
	Ruth G. King	Educational psychologist	1933–	First woman president of the Association of Black Psychologists	
	Valencia Koomson	electrical engineer		Principal investigator for the Advanced Integrated Circuits and Systems Lab at Tufts University	
	Ariangela Kozik	microbiologist, computational biologist, and science communicator		Co-founder and vice president of the Black Microbiologists Association and serves as an assistant professor in the Department of Molecular, Cellular, and Developmental Biology at the University of Michigan	
	Shiriki Kumanyika	obesity researcher		Emeritus professor of biostatistics and epidemiology at the Perelman School of Medicine at the University of Pennsylvania and co-chair of the International Association for the Study of Obesity International Obesity Task Force	

== L ==
Image	Name	Field(s)	Dates	Notes	Ref.
	Blanche J. Lawrence	biochemist	1920–1989	Research assistant in the Health Division of the University of Chicago's Metallurgical Laboratory during the Manhattan Project	
	Margaret Morgan Lawrence	pediatric psychiatrist	1914–2019	Researched negative psychological effects of segregation on Black children	
	Janez Lawson	chemical engineer	1930–1990	A NASA human computer. The first African-American hired into a technical position at Jet Propulsion Laboratory (JPL). She programmed the IBM 701.	
	Katheryn Emanuel Lawson	radiochemist	1926–2008	One of the first few female African American chemists who worked in Sandia National Laboratories	
	Danielle N. Lee	biologist	19??–	Assistant professor of biology at Southern Illinois University Edwardsville, best known for her science blogging and outreach efforts focused on increasing minority participation in STEM fields.	
	Lillian Burwell Lewis	zoolologist	1904–1987	First African-American woman to receive a doctorate degree from the University of Chicago	
	Chekesha Liddell	material science and engineering		Researcher of colloidal materials, and the relationship between micron and submicron length scales	
	Ruth Smith Lloyd	anatomist	1917–1995	First African-American to earn a PhD in anatomy	
	Irene Long	aerospace medicine	1951–2020	First female chief medical officer at the Kennedy Space Center	
	Michelle Lollie	quantum optics and laser systems physicist	1982–	First African-American woman to graduate with a PhD in physics from the Louisiana State University in 2016	
	Dawn Lott	applied mathematician	1965–	Researches numerical partial differential equations in solid mechanics, fluid mechanics, and biomechanics	
	Farah Lubin	Neuroscientist		Prominent researcher of epigenetic mechanisms underlying cognition	
	Sophie Lutterlough	entomologist	1910–2009	Restored hundreds of thousands of insects, classifying thousands at the Smithsonian National Museum of Natural History	
	Ruthie D. Lyle	electrical engineer		First African-American woman to earn a PhD in electrical engineering from Polytechnic University and Principal Technical Patent Architect at NVIDIA	
	Kennda Lynch	astrobiologist and geomicrobiologist		Primarily affiliated with NASA, Lynch identifies environments on Earth with characteristics that may be similar to environments on other planets	
	Beebe Steven Lynk	chemist	1872–1948	Professor of medical Latin botany and materia medica at the University of West Tennessee	

== M ==
Image	Name	Field(s)	Dates	Notes	Ref.
	Iris Mack	mathematician, speaker, and writer	1956–2022	Second black woman to receive a doctorate in applied mathematics from Harvard University and first black woman to teach applied mathematics at the MIT Sloan School of Management	
	Kelly Mack	mathematician		Vice President at the Association of American Colleges and Universities and executive director of Project Kaleidoscope	
	Arlene Maclin	physicist and academic administrator	1945–	In 2011, appointed as the executive director of the MAC-CAE Program and adjunct professor of physics at Morgan State University	
	Carolyn Mahoney	mathematician	1946–	Served as president of Lincoln University of Missouri Researched combinatorics, graph theory, and matroids	
	Shirley M. Malcom	zoologist	1946-	Senior Advisor and Director of SEA Change at the American Association for the Advancement of Science (AAAS)	
	Vivienne Malone-Mayes	mathematician and professor	1932–1995	Studied properties of functions, as well as methods of teaching mathematics. She was the fifth African-American woman to gain a PhD in mathematics in the United States, and the first African-American member of the faculty of Baylor University	
	Miriam D. Mann	mathematician and human computer	1907–1967	One of the first Black female computers for the National Advisory Committee for Aeronautics (NACA)	
	Karla-Sue Marriott	forensic scientist		Professor in the School of Justice Studies at Roger Williams University and the director for the RWU Forensic Science program	
	Brandeis Marshall	data science, computer science and education	19??-	Data scientist, CEO of DataedX Group, a data ethics and strategy management agency.	
	Jessica O. Matthews	inventor and venture capitalist	1988–	Co-founder of Uncharted, which made Soccket, a soccer ball that can be used as a portable power generator	
	Shirley McBay	mathematician	1935–2021	Founder and president of the Quality Education for Minorities (QEM) Network, a nonprofit dedicated to improving minority education	
	Worta McCaskill-Stevens	physician-scientist and medical oncologist	1949–2023	Specialized in cancer disparities research, management of comorbidities within clinical trials, and molecular research for cancer prevention interventions	
	Sharon Caples McDougle	spacesuit technician and crew chief		First African American crew chief and manager of the NASA Space Shuttle Crew Escape Equipment (CEE) Processing department	
	Earyn McGee	herpetologist and science communicator		American Association for the Advancement of Science (AAAS) IF/THEN Ambassador and a 2020 AAAS Mass Media Science & Engineering Fellow. In response to the racism faced by Black birdwatcher Christian Cooper in the Central Park birdwatching incident, McGee co-organized Black Birders Week to celebrate Black birders	
	Camille McKayle	mathematician and provost	1964–	Provost of the University of the Virgin Islands (UVI)	
	Marta Dark McNeese	physicist		First African-American woman to receive a bachelor's degree in physics from the University of Virginia	
	Linda C. Meade-Tollin	biochemist and cancer researcher	1944–	At the University of Arizona, studied DNA damage, angiogenesis, and cancer invasion & metastasis; directed the Office of Women in Science and Engineering there; and was the first female chairperson of the National Organization for the Professional Advancement of Black Chemists and Chemical Engineers (NOBCChE)	
	Juanita Merchant	gastroenterologist and physiology researcher		Studies gastric response to chronic inflammation and is chief of the University of Arizona Division of Gastroenterology and Hepatology	
	Yeshimabeit Milner	Information technologist and activist		Executive director and co-founder of Data for Black Lives	
	Reneé H. Moore	biostatistician		Professor of research in the Drexel University Department of Epidemiology and Biostatistics, and Associate Dean for Diversity, Equity, Inclusion, and Belonging in Drexel's Dornsife School of Public Health	
	Ruth Ella Moore	microbiologist and bacteriologist	1903–1994	First African-American woman to be awarded a PhD in a natural science, and a professor of bacteriology at Howard University	
	Tanya Moore	biostatistics		Activist advocating for women in mathematics and science	
	Tiara Moore	marine science		Leader in organizing the Black in Marine Science week and pursuing social activism	
	Willie Hobbs Moore	physicist and engineer		First African-American woman to earn a PhD in physics	
	Lenora Moragne	nutritionist	1931–2020	Headed the Division of Nutrition Education and Training at the Food and Nutrition Service of the U.S. Department of Agriculture from 1972 to 1977	
	Melba Roy Mouton	mathematician	1959 - 1973	Mathematician who served as Assistant Chief of Research Programs at NASA's Trajectory and Geodynamics Division in the 1960s and headed a group of NASA mathematicians called "computers". She served as Head Mathematician for Echo Satellites 1 and 2 before becoming Head Computer Programmer and then Program Production Section Chief at Goddard Space Flight Center.	
	Diane Powell Murray	software engineer and program manager		In 2006 received Computerworld's Premier 100 Technology Leadership Award, and in 1982 the Candace Award from the National Coalition of 100 Black Women	

== N ==
Image	Name	Field(s)	Dates	Notes	Ref.
	Shelia Nash-Stevenson	Physicist, integration engineer		integration engineer for the Planetary Programs Missions Office at Marshall Space Flight Center	
	Felecia M. Nave	chemical engineer and academic administrator		20th president of Alcorn State University and the first female to serve in the position	
	Ann T. Nelms	nuclear physicist	1929–	Studied persistence of nuclear radioactivity which was cited in reports on nuclear fallout and human health	
	Virginia Newell	politician, mathematics educator and author	1917–2025	Founder of the computer science program at Winston-Salem State University	
	Lyda D. Newman	Inventor	1885–	Patented novel durable hairbrush with synthetic bristles which is still used today	
	Corina Newsome	ornithologist, birder, and science communicator		Newsome and Earyn McGee co-organised Black Birders Week, a weeklong series celebrating Black birders and Black nature enthusiasts on social media	
	Jennifer Ngadiuba	particle physicist, AI expert		alalyzes data from high energy particle collisions using AI to seek patterns	
	Evelyn Nicol	immunologist and microbiologist	1930–2020	First scientist to isolate the herpes zoster virus, and is one of the few African American women to receive a patent in molecular biology, for a new production method of urokinase	
	Victoria Chibuogu Nneji	computer scientist, design and innovation strategist, and a lecturing fellow		Researcher on robotics, automation, human-centered design, and autonomous transportation	
	Dara Norman	astronomer		First African-American woman to earn her PhD in astronomy at the University of Washington	

== O ==
Image	Name	Field(s)	Dates	Notes	Ref.
	Grace O'Connell	biomechanical engineer		Research interests include biomechanics of the human spine and degeneration and regeneration of spinal tissue	
	Bisola Ojikutu	physician, infectious disease specialist, public health leader and health equity researcher		Executive Director of the Boston Public Health Commission and named a STEM Innovator by COLOR Magazine (2022)	
	Wendy Okolo	aerospace research engineer		First African-American woman to obtain a PhD degree in aerospace engineering from University of Texas at Arlington and aerospace research engineer in the Intelligent Systems Division at NASA Ames Research Center	
	Melanie Harrison Okoro	environmental scientist	2009–present	Okoro is known for her efforts in promoting diversity in STEM fields, and she has held multiple positions in several organizations related to diversity and inclusion. Okoro has served on the council of the American Geophysical Union as an early career scientist and was the Diversity & Inclusion task-force chair.	
	Janis Oldham	mathematician	1956–2021	Mathematician specializing in differential geometry and mathematics education and known for her efforts in mentoring mathematics students, especially those from disadvantaged backgrounds	
	Yewande Olubummo	mathematician	1960–present	Research interests include functional analysis and dynamical systems	
	Omayra Ortega	mathematician and mathematical epidemiology		Associate professor of mathematics & statistics at Sonoma State University in Sonoma County, California, and the president of the National Association of Mathematicians (NAM)	
	Ida Stephens Owens	physiology and biochemistry		One of the first two African Americans to receive a doctorate from Duke University and known for her work with drug-detoxifying enzymes.	
	Joan Murrell Owens	marine biologist	1933–2011	Described a new genus and three new species of button corals	

== P ==
Image	Name	Field(s)	Dates	Notes	Ref.
	Dina N. Paltoo	epidemiologist		Epidemiologist specializing in open science, data science, and public access. In 2024 Paltoo was named Acting Deputy Director of Policy and External Affairs, National Library of Medicine	
	Andrea Grimes Parker	computer scientist, researcher, and associate professor		Known for interdisciplinary study of human computer interaction (HCI) and personal health informatics	
	Carolyn Parker	mathematician, physicist	1917–1966	worked on the Dayton Project, the plutonium research and development arm of the Manhattan Project first African-American woman known to have gained a postgraduate degree in physics	
	Jennie Patrick	chemical engineering	1949–	one of the first African American women in the United States to earn a doctorate in traditional chemical engineering; pioneer in supercritical fluid extraction	
	Kathryn Peddrew	mathematician, engineer, and scientist	1922–2012	played a crucial role in the National Advisory Committee for Aeronautics (NACA) and the National Aeronautics and Space Administration (NASA). She was one of the African-American women who worked as a "human computer" at NACA's Langley Research Center in the 1940s and 1950s	
	Audrey S. Penn	neurologist and professor	1934–	first African-American woman to serve as an (acting) director of an Institute of the National Institutes of Health (NIH)	
	Thelma Perry	microbiologist and mycologist	1941–1998	working at the U.S. Forest Service, her research focused on the study of symbiotic relationships between bark beetles and fungi, particularly those associated with the southern pine beetle (Dendroctonus frontalis) and other forest insects	
	Hattie Scott Peterson	civil engineer	1913–1993	believed to be the first African-American woman to gain a bachelor's degree in civil engineering	
	Clarice Phelps	nuclear chemist		first African-American woman to help discover a chemical element (tennessine)	
	Dorothy J. Phillips	chemist	1945-	2025 President of the American Chemical Society In 1967, Phillips was the first African-American woman to complete a bachelor's degree at Vanderbilt University In 1974, Phillips was the first African-American woman in Cincinnati to earn a PhD in biochemistry at the University of Cincinnati	
	Deena Pierott	social entrepreneur, public speaker, and educator		Founder of iUrban Teen, a White House recognized STEM+ Arts educational program for youth of color	
	Vivian W. Pinn	pathologist	1941–	Director of the Office of Research on Women's Health at the National Institutes of Health (NIH)	
	Amina Pollard	limnologist and ecologist		Pollard leads the U.S. Environmental Protection Agency (EPA) National Lakes Assessment, which seeks to provide information on the health of lakes, ponds, and reservoirs across the United States	
	Julianne Pollard-Larkin	medical physicist		Assistant professor at MD Anderson Cancer Center in Houston, Texas, and also the interim Physics Service Chief for the Thoracic service of MD Anderson's Division of Radiation Oncology	
	Keshia Pollack Porter	injury epidemiologist and policy researcher		Bloomberg Centennial Professor at the Johns Hopkins Bloomberg School of Public Health who specializes in health equity and promoting safe environments	
	Chanda Prescod-Weinstein	theoretical physicist, astrophysicist, cosmologist, writer	1982 –	possibly first African-American woman to hold a faculty position in theoretical cosmology	
	Candice Renee Price	mathematician		co-founder of the website Mathematically Gifted & Black	
	Dionne Price	statistician	1971–2024	first African-American president of the American Statistical Association (ASA), the world's largest professional body representing statisticians	
	Jessie Isabelle Price	veterinary microbiologist	1930–2015	isolated and reproduced the cause of the most common life-threatening disease in duck farming in the 1950s	
	LeShawndra Price	psychologist, mental health, and health disparities		Director of the office of research training and special programs at the National Institute of Allergy and Infectious Diseases	
	Sian Proctor	African American explorer, scientist, STEM communicator, and aspiring astronaut		geology, sustainability and planetary science professor	
	Inez Beverly Prosser	psychologist, teacher, and school administrator	c. 1895–1934	One of the first African-American women to earn a PhD in psychology	
	Johnnie Hines Watts Prothro	chemist	1922–2009	One of the first African-American nutritionists and food scientists	

== Q ==
Image	Name	Field(s)	Dates	Notes	Ref.
	Lynnae Quick	planetary scientist, planetary geophysicist	1984 -	Ocean worlds Planetary Scientist at NASA Goddard Space Flight Center; fifth African-American woman to receive a PhD in planetary science; first African-American staff scientist in the history of the Smithsonian Institution's Center for Earth and Planetary Studies, where she worked from 2017 to 2019; Asteroid 2001 SV 291 was renamed Asteroid 37349 Lynnaequick in honor of her work modeling cryovolcanic eruptions and faculae formation on Ceres. First African American to receive the American Astronomical Society's Harold C. Urey Prize which is the highest honor for young planetary scientists and recognizes outstanding achievement in the field of planetary science by an early career researcher.	

== R ==
Image	Name	Field(s)	Dates	Notes	Ref.
	LaVerne E. Ragster	marine biologist and academic administrator	1951–	served as the fourth president of the University of the Virgin Islands from 2002 to 2009	
	Patricia Ramsey	biologist and academic administrator		sixth president of Medgar Evers College since 2021, and the first woman and scientist to serve in this position	
	Kristen Ransom	computer engineer and social entrepreneur		CTO and co-founder of IncluDe Web Design and Development, a web design firm offering affordable services to women- and minority-owned organizations	
	Mary Logan Reddick	neuroembryologist, biologist	1914–1966	possibly the first African-American woman scientist to receive a fellowship to study abroad, and the first female biology instructor at Morehouse College	
	Rosalie A. Reed	veterinarian	1945–	in 1973 Reed became the first woman to work as a veterinarian at a major American zoo (Los Angeles Zoo)	
	Eslanda Goode Robeson	chemist	1896–1965	first Black head histological chemist of Surgical Pathology at New York-Presbyterian Hospital	
	Renã A. S. Robinson	Analytical chemistry, Proteomics		Professor of Chemistry, Dorothy J. Wingfield Phillips Chair Vanderbilt University	
	Antoinette Rodez Schiesler	chemist	1934–1996	Director of research at Villanova University	
	Stephanie J. Rowley	developmental psychologist and academic administrator		Dean of University of Virginia's School of Education and Human Development	
	Gladys W. Royal	chemist	1926–2002	One of the early African-American biochemists; part of one of the few African-American husband-and-wife teams in science	

== S ==
Image	Name	Field(s)	Dates	Notes	Ref.
	Michelle Samuel-Foo	biologist, entomologist		First African American to win a major entomological award, when she was awarded the Entomological Society of America Founders' Memorial Recognition	
	Bonita V. Saunders	mathematical visualization		contributes to the Digital Library of Mathematical Functions as the Visualization Editor of the National Institute of Standards and Technology	
	Antoinette Rodez Schiesler	chemist	1934–1996	director of research at Villanova University	
	Jeanette Scissum	mathematician, space scientist, and diversity advocate	1939 -	joined NASA and put forward techniques for improved forecasting of sunspot cycles	
	Jessica A. Scoffield	microbiologist		Assistant professor in the Department of Microbiology at the University of Alabama at Birmingham School of Medicine	
	Lyndsey Scott	computer programmer	1984–	lead iOS software engineer at NGO fundraiser Rallybound; first African American to sign an exclusive runway contract with Calvin Klein	
	Ruthmae Sears	mathematics educator		focused on systemic inequities that impede student understanding of mathematics	
	Alberta Jones Seaton	embryologist, biologist	1924–2014	One of the first African-American women awarded a doctorate in zoology, in Belgium in 1949.	
	Kimberly Sellers	statistician		head of the statistics department at North Carolina State University since 2023, where she is the first Black woman in the university's history to lead a science department	
	Nashlie Sephus	Artificial intelligence engineer		AI engineer, CTO of startup Partpic (acquired by Amazon) PhD from Georgia Institute of Technology, 2019 Ada Lovelace Award	
	Bridgette Shannon	chemist		first African-American woman to complete a doctoral degree from the chemistry department at the University of Arkansas, and is the current president of the National Organization for the Professional Advancement of Black Chemists and Chemical Engineers (NOBCChE)	
	Cheryl L. Shavers	semiconductor engineering and management	1953–	first African-American Undersecretary of Commerce for Science and Technology	
	Aomawa Shields	physics and astronomy		Associate professor of physics and astronomy at UC Irvine. Explores the climate and habitability of small exoplanets, using data from observatories including NASA's Kepler space telescope	
	Stella James Sims	science professor	1875–1963	In 1897, first African-American woman to graduate from Bates College	
	Daphne L. Smith	mathematician		First African-American woman to earn a Ph.D. in mathematics at the Massachusetts Institute of Technology (MIT)	
	Sonya T. Smith	computational fluid dynamics and thermal management of electronics		Professor at Howard University, the director of the atmospheric sciences program at Howard University, and the 2020–2021 president of Sigma Xi	
	Tonya Smith-Jackson	human factors engineer and academic administrator		Chancellor of Rutgers University–Newark	
	Window Snyder	computer security	1975–	Co-author of Threat Modeling, a standard manual on application security and a security officer at multiple corporations	
	Dolores Richard Spikes	mathematician and university administrator	1936–2015	First African-American woman to earn a Ph.D. in mathematics from Louisiana State University (1971)	
	Mabel Keaton Staupers	Nursing administrator	1890–1989	Instrumental in implementing the desegregation of the U.S. Army Nurse Corps during WWII	
	G. Gabrielle Starr	literary scholar, neuroscientist, and academic administrator	1974–	First woman and first African-American president of Pomona College	
	Alisa Stephens-Shields	biostatistician		Associate professor of biostatistics in the Perelman School of Medicine at the University of Pennsylvania	
	Susan McKinney Steward	pediatrician, homeopath	1847–1918	the third African-American woman to earn a medical degree, and the first in New York.	
	Adrienne Stiff-Roberts	electrical engineer		Researching synthetic organic-inorganic materials	
	Moogega Cooper Stricker	Planetary protection engineer	1985-20??	NASA engineer working on Mars 2020 rover.	
	Marilyn Suiter	geologist	??-2025	Director of education and human resources for the American Geological Institute (AGI)	
	Louise Nixon Sutton	mathematician	1925–2006	First African-American woman to be awarded a PhD in mathematics education by New York University (1962)	
	Thyrsa Frazier Svager	mathematician	1930–1999	The first African-American woman to earn a PhD in mathematics from Ohio State University (1965)	
	Latanya Sweeney	computer scientist		computer scientist best known for work on k-anonymity	

== T ==
Image	Name	Field(s)	Dates	Notes	Ref.
	Dasia Taylor	inventor, scientist	2004–	Invented medical sutures that indicate infection by changing color	
	Kishana Taylor	Virologist and academic		Co-founder and president of the Black Microbiologists Association	
	Marie Taylor	botanist	1911–1990	First woman to earn a science doctorate at Fordham University, and the Head of the Botany Department at Howard University from 1947 to her retirement in 1976	
	Valerie Taylor	computer scientist	1963–	Director of the Mathematics and Computer Science Division of Argonne National Laboratory	
	Jakita O. Thomas	computer science, engineering		Philpott Westpoint Stevens associate professor of computer science and software engineering at Auburn University	
	Valerie Thomas	physicist and inventor	1943–	Inventor of the Illusion Transmitter; Overseer of NASA's Landsat program, international expert in Landsat data products	
	Maria Thompson	scientist and academic administrator		First woman president of Coppin State University	
	Sabrina Thompson	aerospace engineer	1985–	Flight Dynamics Lead Analyst at the NASA Goddard Space Flight Center in Maryland	
Lisette Titre-Montgomery	Lisette Titre-Montgomery	Game Developer	1998–	Art Director and Game Developer . Lisette has contributed to some of the industry's highest profile games, including Tiger Woods Golf, The Simpsons, Dante's Inferno, Dance Central 3, SIMS 4, South Park, and Transformers Age Of Extinction for Android and iOS. Her most recent project is Psychonauts 2 with Double Fine Productions.	
	Margaret E. M. Tolbert	chemist and science administrator	1943–	the first African American and the first woman in charge of a Department of Energy lab	
	Rubye Prigmore Torrey	chemist	1926–2017	Known for developing a mechanism to decompose hydrogen sulfide, which earned her a place in Sigma Xi	
	Renetta Garrison Tull	electrical engineer and global policy strategist		Vice Chancellor of Diversity, Equity, and Inclusion at University of California, Davis	
	Ella Tyree	medical researcher	1920–1989	Investigated effects of radiation poisoning in animals and potential treatments	

== V ==
Image	Name	Field(s)	Dates	Notes	Ref.
	Jami Valentine	physicist and electrical engineer	1974–	First African-American woman to graduate with a PhD in physics from Johns Hopkins University	
	Powtawche Valerino	mechanical engineer		First Native American to earn a PhD in engineering at Rice University	
	Dorothy Vaughan	Fortran Computer Specialist	1910–2008	One of the first female coders in the field who knew how to code FORTRAN and the first African-American Manager at NASA	
	Argelia Velez-Rodriguez	mathematician and educator	1936–	Fourth African-American woman to earn a Ph.D. in mathematics (University of Havana)	

== W ==
Image	Name	Field(s)	Dates	Notes	Ref.
	Ashley Walker	astrochemist, science communicator, and activist		Co-organized #BlackinChem, #BlackInAstro, and #BlackInPhysics to highlight and amplify the voices of Black researchers and scholars in these fields	
	Erica N. Walker	mathematician	1971 –	Clifford Brewster Upton Professor of Mathematics Education at Teachers College, Columbia University	
	Chelsea Walton	mathematician	1983 –	Professor at Rice University and named a Sloan Research Fellow in 2017	
	Dawn Ward	synthetic chemist	1973 –	Chemist creating molecules active against Hepatitis C virus	
	Jessica Ware	evolutionary biologist, entomologist.		Work on phylogenomics of insect evolution	
	Alicia Nicki Washington	computer scientist, author, and professor		First Black woman to earn a Doctor of Philosophy degree in Computer Science from North Carolina State University in 2005	
	Talitha Washington	mathematician	1974–	in 2023, became the 26th president of the Association for Women in Mathematics	
	Bevlee Watford	engineer and academic administrator	1958–	First African-American woman president of the American Society for Engineering Education, associate dean for equity and engagement and professor of engineering education at the Virginia Tech College of Engineering	
	Ola B. Watford	geophysicist	1927–1997	Chief of the Space Management and Design branch of the NOAA in Rockville, Maryland	
	Alfreda Johnson Webb	veterinarian	1923–1992	First African-American woman licensed to practice veterinary medicine in the United States	
	Jennifer Webster-Cyriaque	dentist and immunologist		Deputy director of the National Institute of Dental and Craniofacial Research	
	Suzanne Weekes	mathematician		chief executive officer of the Society for Industrial and Applied Mathematics. and professor of Mathematical sciences at Worcester Polytechnic Institute (WPI)	
	Kimberly Weems	statistician		in 2020, one of the first three African-American women to complete her PhD in applied mathematics at the University of Maryland, College Park	
	Rosemarie Wesson	chemical engineering		first African-American woman to receive a PhD in chemical engineering from the University of Michigan in 2023, City University of New York appointed her associate vice chancellor and university vice provost for research	
	Gladys West	mathematician	1930 –	work on satellite geodesy models used in GPS	
	Lisa White	micropaleontology		geologist and director of Education and Outreach at the University of California Museum of Paleontology	
	Renée T. White	sociologist and academic administrator		Provost and executive vice president for academic affairs at The New School, where she is also a tenured professor of sociology	
	Jalonne White-Newsome	environmental health sciences		in 2022 named Senior Director for Environmental Justice by the White House	
	Desiré Whitmore	laser physicist, science communicator	1980–	work on attosecond X-ray laser systems, senior physics educator at the Exploratorium	
	Barbara A. Williams	radio astronomer		First African-American woman to earn a PhD in astronomy (University of Maryland, College Park, 1981)	
	LaNell Williams	physicist and virologist	1993–	Third African-American woman to receive a PhD in physics from Harvard University	
	Marguerite Williams	geologist	1895–1991	the first African American to earn a doctorate in geology in the United States	
	Marsha Rhea Williams	educator and researcher	1948–	First African-American woman to earn a PhD in computer science	
	Reva Williams	theoretical astrophysicist		First person to successfully work out the Penrose process using Einstein's Theory of Relativity to extract energy from black holes	
	Roselyn E. Williams	mathematician	1950 –	co-founded the Alliance for the Production of African American PhDs in the Mathematical Sciences, which is now known as the National Alliance for Doctoral Studies in the Mathematical Sciences	
	Tanisha Williams	botanist		Founder of #BlackBotanistsWeek as an initiative to promote Black botanists and to share their work and life experiences on social media	
	Stephanie Wilson	engineer and NASA astronaut	1966 –	second African-American woman to go into space after Mae Jemison. As of 2025, her 43 days in space are the second most of any female African-American astronaut	
	Ulrica Wilson	mathematician, noncommutative rings and combinatorics of matrices		associate professor at Morehouse College and associate director of diversity and outreach at the Institute for Computational and Experimental Research in Mathematics (ICERM)	
	Karen Winkfield	radiation oncologist, physician-scientist, and implementation scientist	1970–	Ingram Professor of Cancer Research at Vanderbilt University School of Medicine	
	Danielle Wood	aerospace engineering and technology policy		Assistant professor in the MIT Media Lab, where she directs the research group Space Enabled and Wood is the first African-American woman professor at the MIT Media Lab	
	Geraldine Pittman Woods	science administrator	1921–1999	known for her lifelong dedication to community service and for establishing programs that promote minorities in STEM fields, scientific research, and basic research	
	Dawn Wright	oceanographer, geographer	1961–	expert in seafloor mapping, marine geographic information systems	
	Jane C. Wright	cancer researcher, surgeon	1919–2013	pioneering cancer researcher and surgeon noted for her contributions to chemotherapy	
	Vanessa E. Wyche	engineer and civil servant		since 2025, acting associate administrator of NASA and served previously as Director of NASA's Johnson Space Center (JSC)	

== Y ==
Image	Name	Field(s)	Dates	Notes	Ref.
	Josephine Silone Yates	chemist	1859–1912	one of the first Black professors hired at Lincoln University; first Black woman to head a college science department; may have been the first Black woman to hold a full professorship at any U.S. college or university	
	Roger Arliner Young	zoology	1889-1964	first Black woman to earn a PhD in Zoology	

== See also ==
- List of Women in Technology International Hall of Fame inductees
- STEM pipeline
- National Society of Black Engineers
- African American women in computer science
- List of African-American women in medicine
