= Njema Frazier =

American nuclear physicist

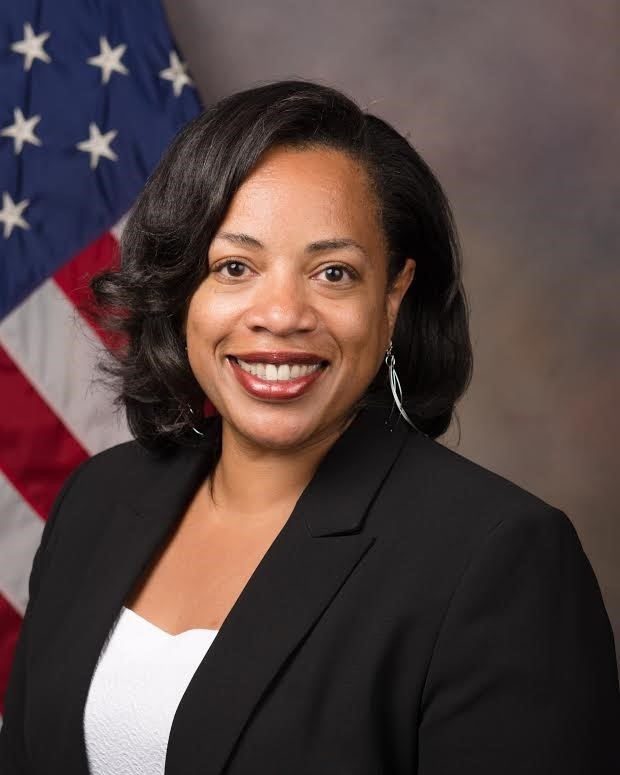
- Born: March 13, 1974 (age 52); San Francisco, California
- Education: Carnegie Mellon, Michigan State University
- Awards: Alumni Achievement Award Spotlight from Carnegie Mellon University, The Black Engineer of the Year, Department of Defense Joint Civilian Service Commendation Award, Award for Distinguished Service to the National Nuclear Security Administration, Science Spectrum's Trailblazer Award
- Scientific career
- Fields: Nuclear physics
- Workplaces: Department of Energy, National Nuclear Security Administration

Njema Frazier (born in San Francisco, California on March 13, 1974) is a nuclear physicist at the Department of Energy's National Nuclear Security Administration (NNSA) in Washington, D.C.

Frazier has a bachelor's degree in physics from Carnegie Mellon University and a PhD in nuclear physics from Michigan State University.

She is a member of the National Society of Black Engineers (NSBE).

== Early life and education ==
Dr. Frazier was born and raised in San Francisco, CA. She had an early interest in math, but it was not until attending a summer program that she discovered her aptitude for both math and science. About that summer, she has said, "I loved it so much that I became a student mentor after I aged out of the program." She attended Carnegie Mellon University where she received a B.S. in 1992. After finishing her undergraduate degree, she went on to receive both an M.S. in physics and a Ph.D. in theoretical nuclear physics from Michigan State University (MSU), the top-ranked US nuclear physics program according to U.S. News & World Report. While at MSU, she worked at the National Superconducting Cyclotron Lab (NSCL) focusing on "Properties of Shell-Model Wavefunctions at High Excitation Energies."

== Career ==
After receiving her Ph.D., she worked as a professional staff member for the Committee on Science at the U.S. House of Representatives for four years. Dr. Frasier then started her career at the NNSA, working as a nuclear physicist from 2001 to 2016. She has also been an active member of the National Society of Black Engineers and served as National Alumni Chair in 2008 and National Leadership Institute Chairperson from 2010 to 2012. Dr. Frazier has also held leadership roles in two Department of Energy (DOE) programs, the OneDOE Campaign and the Minorities in Energy Initiative. She is also the co-founder of the POWER (Professional Opportunities for Women at Energy Realized) Employee Resource Group for women at the DOE. POWER supports women at the DOE professionally and personally as well as working to reach out to and inspire young women to enter STEM. Additionally, she has worked to expand Google's #IamRemarkable initiative to younger populations, including high school girls and other groups that are underrepresented in STEM.

At the NNSA, Dr. Frazier has held multiple positions, such as the acting director of the International Program Management Division, Acting Deputy Director of the Advanced Simulation and Computing (ASC) Division, and acting director of the Office of Inertial Confinement Fusion (ICF). In these divisions, she has worked on improving scientific knowledge for high energy density physics (HEDP) in relation to weapons. Dr. Frazier has helped ensure the continued safe maintenance of nuclear weapon stockpiles.

As a senior scientist in the Defense Science Division, Dr. Njema Frazier leads the upkeep and organization of weapons-related science activities without needing to conduct explosive nuclear testing at Los Alamos, Lawrence Livermore, and Sandia National Laboratories.

While working in the NNSA, Dr. Frazier has also served as a visiting professor at the National Defense University and created her own consulting company: Diversity Science, to create connections between science subject matter experts with those hiring in the public and private sector in order to get a more diverse applicant pool.

== Awards and honors ==
- 2018 Alumni Achievement Award Spotlight from CMU
- The Grio's List of 100 History Makers in the Making
- The Essence Power List
- The EBONY Power 100 List
- The Black Engineer of the Year

== See also ==
- List of African American women in STEM fields
