= Carol Blanche Cotton =

American psychologist

- Born: 20 August 1904; Henderson, North Carolina
- Died: 22 November 1971; Elyria, Ohio
- Other names: Carol C. Bowie, Mrs. William T. Bowie
- Education: Oberlin College
- Alma mater: Columbia University and University of Chicago
- Parent(s): John Adams Cotton; Maude (Brooks) Cotton
- Scientific career
- Fields: Psychology
- Thesis: A Study of the Reactions of Spastic Children to Certain Test Situations (1939)

Carol Blanche Cotton (Carol C. Bowie) (August 20, 1904 – November 22, 1971) was an American psychologist.

She was born in the city of Henderson, North Carolina, the only child of John Adams Cotton and Maude (Brooks) Cotton.

Carol Cotton received her bachelor's degree from Oberlin College, her master's from Columbia University in 1927, and her Ph.D. from Department of Psychology, University of Chicago in 1939. She was elected to the scientific honor society Sigma Xi.

Her dissertation "A study of the reactions of spastic children to certain test situations" studied how children with the condition spastic paralysis performed in cognitive tests compared to matched children who matched similarly by sex, age, and mental age. The study found that spastic children had different test responses such as "bizarre or fantastic responses", more concrete than abstract, and more stereotypical compared to normal children. Their resulting hypothesis suggests that these tendencies are most likely due to cortical injuries from spastic children. A neurological diagnosis would be necessary to confirm this study's hypothesis.

== Professional career ==
Carol Cotton Bowie first taught at Bennett College and Tuskegee University before being appointed to the position of professor in the Psychology Department of what is now North Carolina Central University in Durham, North Carolina. She served as head of the department before her retirement in 1962.

== Personal life ==
Cotton's great-grandmother was Rebecca Harris, a domestic worker in Michigan. After Harris' oldest child was denied admission to the seminary where Harris worked due to her race, she moved her husband and four children to Oberlin so that the children could go to college there. Rebecca Harris was also one of the "few voting women delegates at an Emigration Convention in Cleveland in 1854". Cotton was the daughter of the Reverend John Adams Cotton, a Presbyterian minister who served as the president of the Henderson Normal Institute (1903–43); he would later serve as president of Knoxville College. and the former Miss Maude R. Brooks, who also graduated from Oberlin College (1896). Mrs. Cotton was also an educator as well as a musician and author; she wrote the words and the music to the song "We Are Lifting As We Climb."

On July 9, 1943, Carol Cotton married William T. Bowie in Chicago, Illinois, with whom she had a daughter. They would subsequently divorce.

In her later years, Bowie lived in Oberlin, Ohio.

She was a member of Alpha Kappa Alpha.

== Honors ==
She was elected in 1951 a Fellow of the American Association for the Advancement of Science.
