= Stephanie J. Rowley =

American developmental psychologist

Stephanie Rowley
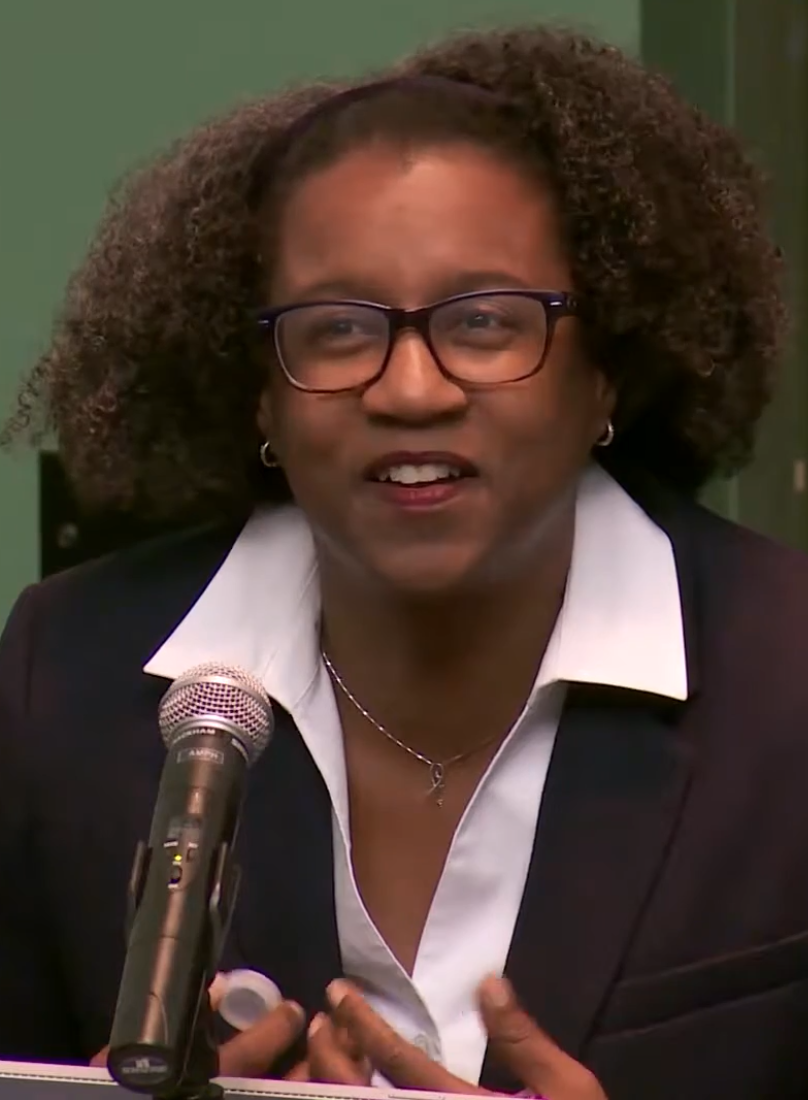
- Rowley in 2016

Academic background
- Education: University of Michigan (BA); University of Virginia (MA, PhD)

Academic work
- Institutions: Teachers College, Columbia University

Stephanie Johnson Rowley is an American developmental psychologist and academic administrator known for her work on racial identity and parental socialization of race and ethnicity. She is the dean of University of Virginia's School of Education and Human Development.

Rowley was previously the provost, dean, and vice president for academic affairs, and a professor of psychology and education at Teachers College, Columbia University. She is a member of the Governing Council of the Society for Research in Child Development.

== Biography ==
Rowley attended the University of Michigan, where she received her B.A degree in Honors Psychology and African American Studies in 1992. She later attended the University of Virginia (UVA), where she obtained her M.A in 1995 and Ph.D. in 1997 in Developmental Psychology. Her dissertation was titled "Racial identity, school engagement, and educational utility in African-American high school students." While at the University of Virginia, Rowley was supported by a Ford Foundation Fellowship and was a Carter G. Woodson Predoctoral Fellow. Her mentor was Robert M. Sellers.

After graduating, she was hired as an assistant professor of psychology at the University of North Carolina at Chapel Hill. In 2000, she moved to the Department of Psychology at the University of Michigan where she was affiliated with the Center for Human Growth and Development. At Michigan, Rowley received the Rackham Distinguished Graduate Mentor Award in 2015 and the Cornerstone Award in 2018 in recognition of her efforts in supporting the academic and social development of African-American students. Rowley served as Associate Chair in the Department of Psychology, Chair of the Combined Program in Education and Psychology, and Associate Vice President for Research at the University of Michigan before moving to Teachers College, Columbia University in 2019.

Rowley has received grant support for her research from the National Science Foundation.

In September 2022, Rowley was appointed dean of the UVA School of Education and Human Development.

== Research ==
Rowley's research program focuses on development of children's racial and gender identities and their attitudes and beliefs about race and gender. Her interdisciplinary field of study encompasses developmental psychology, Black studies, and education. She has participated in multiple high impact studies which led to the development of a multidimensional model of racial identity. This model examines racial identity in two distinct ways, by exploring universal properties associated with ethnic and racial identities and documenting the qualitative meaning of being African American. Some key findings from this model are four dimensions of African American racial identity: salience, centrality, regard, and ideology. Rowley has also contributed to research aimed at understanding parental influences on children's school-related development in the early years, gender stereotypes about mathematics and science, and children's self-perceptions of ability in late childhood and early adolescence. One key finding from this research is that when boys believe that adults hold more traditional stereotypes, they correspondingly tend to hold beliefs that girls are relatively less capable or that boys are more capable in mathematics and science. These results provide support for social status and experiential theories of development.

== Representative publications ==
- Rowley, S. J. (2000). Profiles of African American college students' educational utility and performance: A cluster analysis. Journal of Black Psychology, 26(1), 3-26.
- Rowley, S. J., Burchinal, M. R., Roberts, J. E., & Zeisel, S. A. (2008). Racial identity, social context, and race-related social cognition in African Americans during middle childhood. Developmental Psychology, 44(6), 1537–1546.
- Rowley, S. J., Kurtz‐Costes, B., Mistry, R., & Feagans, L. (2007). Social status as a predictor of race and gender stereotypes in late childhood and early adolescence. Social Development, 16(1), 150–168.
- Rowley, S. J., Sellers, R. M., Chavous, T. M., & Smith, M. A. (1998). The relationship between racial identity and self-esteem in African American college and high school students. Journal of Personality and Social Psychology, 74(3), 715–724.
- Sellers, R. M., Rowley, S. A., Chavous, T. M., Shelton, J. N., & Smith, M. A. (1997). Multidimensional Inventory of Black Identity: A preliminary investigation of reliability and construct validity. Journal of Personality and Social Psychology, 73(4), 805–815.
- Taylor, L. C., Clayton, J. D., & Rowley, S. J. (2004). Academic socialization: Understanding parental influences on children's school-related development in the early years. Review of General Psychology, 8 (3), 163–178.
