= Martha Banks =

Research neuropsychologist

- Born: July 1951 (age 75)
- Citizenship: United States
- Occupations: Research neuropsychologist, ABackans DCP
- Awards: Society for the Psychology of Women: Sue Rosenberg Zalk Award for Distinguished Service (2003); Committee on Women in Psychology Distinguished Leadership Award (2012)

Academic background
- Education: Brown University; University of Rhode Island

Martha E. Banks (born July 1951) is a retired clinical psychologist known her expertise on issues involving women, race, trauma, disability, religion, and their intersectionality. She is a research neuropsychologist and computer programmer at ABackans DCP Inc.

Banks was a founder of the Society for the Psychological Study of Ethnic Minority Issues, which became the Society for the Psychological Study of Culture, Ethnicity and Race, American Psychological Association (APA), Division 45. She served as President of the Society for the Psychology of Women (APA, Division 35) from 2008 to 2009 and as their Division Representative to the APA Council in 2012. She was the 1997 Chair of the APA Committee on Women, and served on the APA Board for the Advancement of Psychology in the Public Interest.

== Biography ==
Banks was born in Washington D.C in 1951 and grew up in Newport, Rhode Island. As both of her parents were graduates of Brown University, Banks had a very different life when it came to education as compared to other African American girls growing up in the 1960s.

Banks received her B.S. degree at Brown University in 1973. She then attended graduate school at the University of Rhode Island where she obtained a M.A. in 1978 and a PhD in clinical psychology in 1980. Her dissertation was titled "Emotions and Music: A Correlational Study." Banks worked as a psychologist at the Brecksville Veterans Administration Hospital from 1983 to 1996. She was on the faculty of the College of Wooster from 1989 to 1991 and from 2003 to 2005. She also served as a Part-Time Leave Replacement Adjunct Professor at Kent State University from February to May in 2012, where she taught Development of Gender Role & Identity.

Banks's research and clinical work has focused on women with disabilities, including their elevated risk for physical and psychological abuse. Several of her studies have looked specifically at the traumatic brain injuries sustained by victims of domestic violence. With Rosalie Ackerman, Banks developed the Ackerman-Banks Neuropsychological Battery, which was one of the first assessments to include an ethnic minority normative sample, and the Post-Assault Traumatic Brain Injury Interview and Checklist. As a part of Society of Rehabilitation Psychology, Banks advocated for people with visible and invisible disabilities.

== Awards ==
Banks received the Sue Rosenberg Zalk Award for Distinguished Service to the Society for the Psychology of Women in 2003. The APA gave her a Presidential Citation for Leadership in 2008, citing leadership in the areas of women and psychology, ethnic-minority affairs and rehabilitation psychology. In 2012, the APA Committee on Women in Psychology honored Banks with a Distinguished Leadership Award, with her award citation stating, "She has been a pioneer in the effective integration of feminist theory with the issues experienced by women with disabilities, and has advanced psychology's understanding of the intersection of gender, race, and disability."

As an alumnus of the University of Rhode Island (URI), Banks was honored with the President's Distinguished Achievement Award in 2010 and the University Diversity Award for Lifetime Achievement in 2013.

== Books ==
- Banks, M. E., Gover, M. S., Kendall, E., & Marshall, C. A. (Eds.). (2009). Disabilities: Insights from across fields and around the world [3 volumes]. ABC-CLIO. ISBN 978-0-313-34605-7.
- Banks, M. E., & Kaschak, E. (2003). Women with visible and invisible disabilities: Multiple intersections, multiple issues, multiple therapies. Haworth Press.
- Banks, M. E., Kendall, E., Marshall, C. A., Gover, R. M., & Bornemann, T. (Eds.) (2009). Disabilities. insights from across fields and around the world. Praeger.
