= Melanie Harrison Okoro =

Marine environmental scientist (born 1982)

- Born: Melanie Denise Harrison; November 22, 1982 (age 43); Cocoa Beach, Florida, U.S.
- Education: Johnson C. Smith University (BS); University of Maryland (Ph.D)
- Scientific career
- Fields: Environmental science

Melanie Harrison Okoro (born 1982) is an American marine estuarine and environmental scientist. She is the founder, CEO, and principal of Eco-Alpha Environmental & Engineering Services. Okoro focuses on environmental aquatic biogeochemistry, professional natural resource management, and STEM diversity initiatives. She is the first African-American women early-career scientist to serve on the Council of the American Geophysical Union (AGU).

== Early life and education ==
Melanie Harrison Okoro was born in Cocoa Beach, Florida. Her family moved to Tuskegee, Alabama, where she grew up. Okoro first discovered her interest in environmental science through swimming and fishing with her great-grandmother and twin sister in Lake Martin, Alabama. She attended Johnson C. Smith University in Charlotte, North Carolina. She graduated in 2005 with a Bachelor of Science in biology, and finished her education when she received her Doctor of Philosophy degree in Marine Estuarine and Environmental Science from the University of Maryland, Baltimore County in 2011.

== Career and research ==
Okoro is CEO of Eco-Alpha Environmental and Engineering Services, Inc and its partner companies. Before founding Eco-Alpha, Okoro worked for the National Oceanic & Atmospheric Administration. Okoro specializes in marine estuaries.

Okoro was featured by Grist Magazine as one of 8 black leaders who are reshaping the climate movement in 2017.

== Public engagement ==
Okoro has promoted diversity in STEM fields, and held positions in organizations related to diversity and inclusion. She served on the council of the American Geophysical Union as an early career scientist and was the Diversity & Inclusion task-force chair. She was a member of the Earth Science Women's Network's Leadership Board, and a member of Minorities Striving and Pursuing Higher Degrees of Success in Earth and Space Science's leadership board. Okoro is on the board of trustees of Sacramento Splash. Okoro is an appointed representative for the Sacramento Black Chamber of Commerce on the High Speed Rail Business Advisory Council.

== Awards and honors ==
- 2008-2009 Cary Institute of Ecosystems Studies Graduate Fellow
- 2011 Invited session speaker, Society for Advancing Chicano and Native Americans in Science (SACNAS)
- 2012 Invited session speaker, Society of Freshwater Science
- 2016 Baltimore Ecosystem Studies Distinguished Alumni Award
- 2017 Fisheries Employee of the Year Award, National Oceanic & Atmospheric Administration
- 2020 High Speed Rail Small Business Partner Spotlight
- 2021 National Educator's Virtual Conference keynote speaker, JASON learning
- 2022 40 Under 40, Comstock's Magazine
- 2023 GRIT-X featured speaker, University of Maryland Baltimore County

== Selected publications ==
- Harrison, Melanie D.; Miller, Andrew J.; Groffman, Peter M.; Mayer, Paul M.; Kaushal, Sujay S. (2014). "Hydrologic Controls on Nitrogen and Phosphorous Dynamics in Relict Oxbow Wetlands Adjacent to an Urban Restored Stream". Jawra Journal of the American Water Resources Association. 50 (6): 1365–1382. doi:10.1111/jawr.12193. hdl:11603/42106. S2CID 129911392.
- Harrison, Melanie D.; Groffman, Peter M.; Mayer, Paul M.; Kaushal, Sujay S. (2012). "Nitrate removal in two relict oxbow urban wetlands: A 15N mass-balance approach". Biogeochemistry. 111 (1–3): 647–660. Bibcode:2012AGUFM.B43H0532H. doi:10.1007/s10533-012-9708-1. S2CID 98668753.
- Harrison, Melanie D.; Groffman, Peter M.; Mayer, Paul M.; Kaushal, Sujay S. (2012). "Microbial biomass and activity in geomorphic features in forested and urban restored and degraded streams". Ecological Engineering. 38: 1–10. doi:10.1016/j.ecoleng.2011.09.001.
- Harrison, Melanie; Stanwyck, Elizabeth; Beckingham, Barbara; Starry, Olyssa; Hanlon, Bernadette; Newcomer, Justin (2012). "Smart growth and the septic tank: Wastewater treatment and growth management in the Baltimore region". Land Use Policy. 29 (3): 483–492. doi:10.1016/j.landusepol.2011.08.007.
- Harrison, Melanie D.; Groffman, Peter M.; Mayer, Paul M.; Kaushal, Sujay S.; Newcomer, Tamara A. (2011). "Denitrification in Alluvial Wetlands in an Urban Landscape". Journal of Environmental Quality. 40 (2): 634–646. Bibcode:2011JEnvQ..40..634H. doi:10.2134/jeq2010.0335. PMID 21520770.
- Johnson, Ashanti; Harrison, Melanie (March–April 2015). "The Increasing Problem of Nutrient Runoff on the Coast". American Scientist. 103 (2). ProQuest 1664136233.
