= Jennifer Ngadiuba =

Particle Physicist

- Known for: Use of Artificial Intelligence and Machine Learning to analyse particle physics data at CERN
- Awards: Early Career Scientist Prize in Particle Physics; U.S. Department of Energy's AI4HEP award
- Scientific career
- Fields: Particle Physics; Machine Learning; Artificial Intelligence
- Institutions: Fermilab; Caltech; CERN

Jennifer Ngadiuba is a particle physicist and AI expert currently working as an associate scientist at the Fermi National Accelerator Laboratory. Her most notable work is the application of Artificial intelligence and Machine learning to address high-energy particle physics at ultrafast speeds in real-time through anomaly detection. Since 2013, she has worked with at the Large Hadron Collider at CERN.

== Education ==
Ngadiuba claims she has known she wanted to study physics since in high school. She completed her bachelor's and master's degrees at the University of Milano-Bicocca where she became interested in particle physics and undertook opportunities to work with CERN through young scientist mentoring program. Following her masters degree, Ngadiuba completed her PhD in Physics at the University of Zurich working on Compact Muon Solenoid (CMS) data analyses. After a postdoctoral fellowship position at Caltech, Ngadiuba worked as a CERN fellow for three years. Since 2021, Ngadiuba has maintained the Wilson fellowship at Fermilab, considered a tenure-track position.

== Career and research ==
Ngadiuba’s expertise is in analyzing the large amounts of data produced by high energy particle collisions through machine learning. She started her career by building and testing CMS detectors, but made the switch to machine learning during a postdoc at CERN in 2017. Her current work aims to improve the amount of data obtained from particle collisions through real-time AI inferences, in order to determine if they align with the Standard Model of particle physics. AI can use patterns in the data from millions of collisions to find rare insights, through detection of anomalies. Her team has partnered with Google to minimise their computing footprint.

She is a member of the CMS collaboration and co-founded the fast machine learning organisation.

As of March 2025, Ngadiuba has over 1000 publications and has been cited over 140,000 times.

== Personal life ==
During the COVID-19 pandemic, Ngadiuba worked from home with her husband, also a particle physicist. The pandemic delayed her visiting CERN following her appointment as a Caltech fellow.

== Awards ==
In 2024, Ngadiuba was awarded the 2024 Early Career Scientist Prize in Particle Physics by the International Union of Pure and Applied Physics at the International Conference on High Energy Physics in Prague.

In 2023, Ngadiuba’s work in AI applications to CMS physics earned her the United States Department of Energy AI4HEP award.

Additionally, in 2022, she was selected for the Schmidt Sciences Further AI2050 Early Career Fellowship
