= Kandis Leslie Abdul-Aziz =

American engineer

Kandis Leslie Gillard-Abdul-Aziz
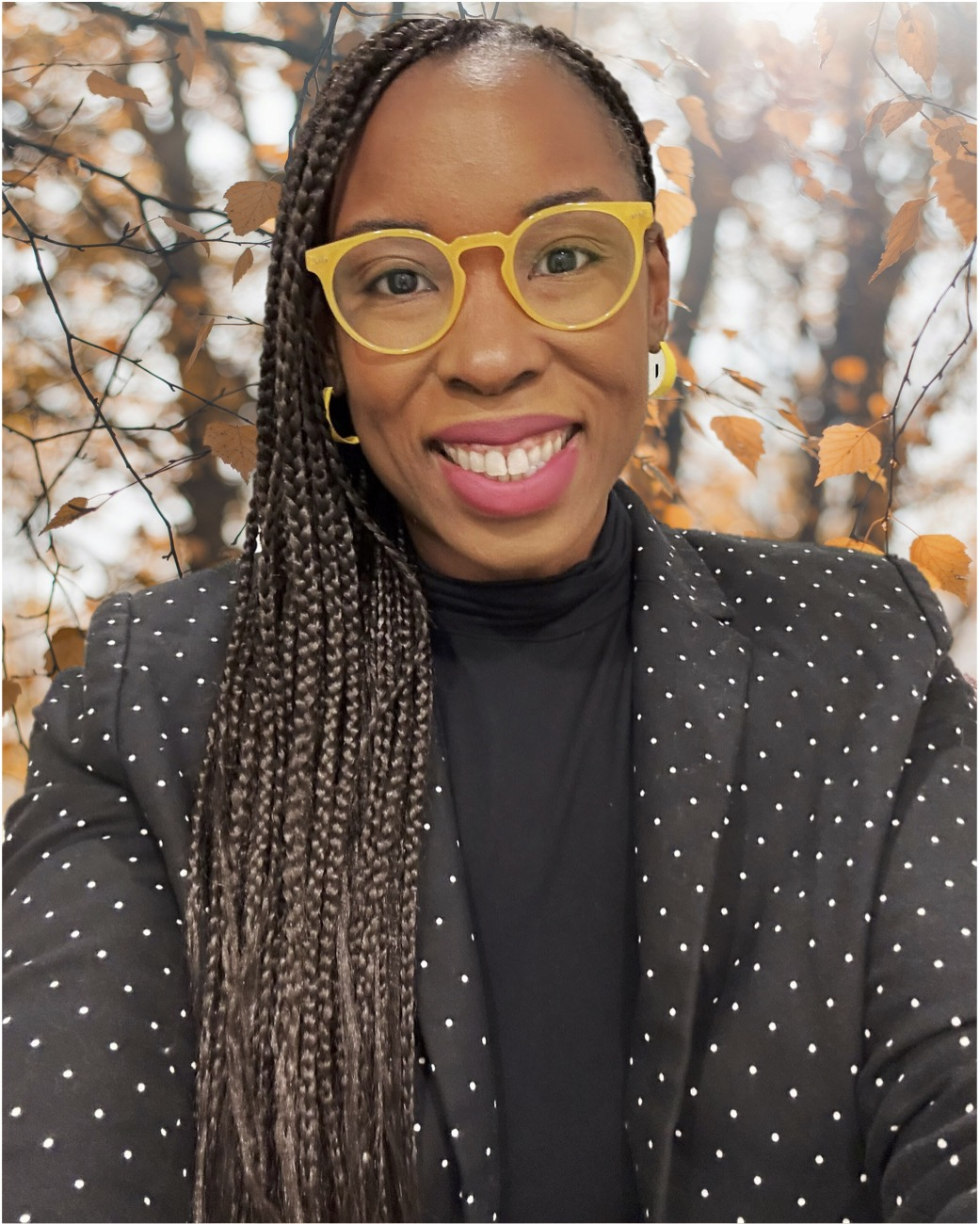
- Born: Charleston, South Carolina Philadelphia, Pennsylvania
- Education: Temple University University of Illinois, Urbana-Champaign
- Scientific career
- Fields: Chemical and environment engineering
- Workplaces: University of Southern California
- Website: https://www.the-sustainable-lab.com/prof-gilliard-abdulaziz.html

Kandis Leslie Gillard-Abdul Aziz is an American chemical and environmental engineer known for the development of technologies that turn agricultural waste into a filtration system for water. She worked as an assistant professor in the Chemical and Environmental Engineering Department at the University of California, Riverside. Before joining the University of Southern California, she directed the Sustainable Lab, a diagnostic center for repurposing waste materials into innovative products that offer benefits to society. Her research focuses on combining chemistry, materials science, and engineering to create new ways to isolate and harness CO2.

== Career and research ==
After obtaining her Bachelor's in chemistry in 2007 from Temple University, she secured a role testing the refinery's waste-water and examining refined petroleum goods such as phenol and acetone at a refinery located near the Schuylkill River in South Philadelphia. Gillard-AbdulAziz later worked for the Philadelphia Police Department as a refinery chemist at Sunoco Chemicals specializing in forensic science from 2009-2011. As a forensic chemist she worked in the Philadelphia police department, analyzing and confirming the composition of suspected drugs obtained by police during arrests. She latter contributed toward pioneering the protocol for analyzing synthetic marijuana when it first made an appearance. She then branched out to entrepreneurship and founded her own company called Nardo Technology in 2016, named after Leonardo Da Vinci. While she founded her company she simultaneously furthered her education by pursuing a Ph.D. in Chemistry at the University of Illinois, Urbana-Champaign. In the following year, 2017, Abdul-Aziz became a Provost postdoctoral fellow at the University of Pennsylvania, where she focused on developing new methods for synthesizing heterogeneous catalysts. After completing her Doctorate, Gillard-AbdulAziz became an assistant professor at the University of California, Riverside in 2018, working in the Chemical and Environmental Engineering department. In 2020, she received a $30,000 Hellman Fellowship to support her development of expandable technology in plastic waste repurposing. Additionally in 2020, a paper she helped cowrite on ways to turn Lignin into fuel was published.

Gillard-AbdulAziz was recognized as one of the top up-and-coming minds in the 2022 issue of the Popular Science magazine "The Brilliant 10." Gillard-AbdulAziz focuses on repurposing waste materials such as corn stover and citrus peels into activated carbon filters for environmental cleanup. She also explores converting plastic trash and developing absorbent materials to capture and reuse carbon dioxide emissions, aiming to create practical recycling solutions for a more sustainable circular economy.

Gillard-AbdulAziz holds the Pasqual and Adelina Early Career Chair in Civil and Environmental Engineering department at the University of Southern California. She leads the Sustainable Catalysis and Materials Laboratory, focusing on transforming waste materials like carbon dioxide, citrus peel and plastic into valuable products through catalysis. Her work, recently recognized with a 2024 Alfred P. Sloan Research Fellowship in Chemistry, aims to create recyclable products and mitigate global warming by developing innovative reuse processes. Gillard-AbdulAziz's approach involves integrating sustainability and economic viability, with a focus on practical solutions for industry and policymakers.

In addition to her scientific contributions, Gillard-AbdulAziz has helped advocate for equitable access to STEM pathways. She frequently partners with academic associations, federal agencies, and sustainability-focused organizations to advise on emerging technologies for carbon upcycling and waste valorization. Her commitment to mentorship and community engagement is reflected in her leadership roles within national engineering networks, where she works to increase representation of women and historically underrepresented groups in environmental engineering and catalysis research.

Her work further centers around innovational approaches to waste management, as sustainable catalysis has garnered much recognition. Dr. Kandis Leslie Gillard-AbdulAziz received a $538,000 National Science Foundation CAREER Award in 2021 for her research on converting greenhouse gas into energy chemicals at the University of California Riverside. Her research has also been pivotal in advancing sustainable chemical processes for low-carbon chemical production. Notably, her development of carbon sequestration technologies for direct methanation in an integrated CO2 capture and utilization process represents a significant step towards enhancing the efficiency and sustainability of CO2 conversion technologies. Abdul-Aziz work furthers her passion in capturing CO2 and methane into effecient fuels and other industrial chemicals, she says to the University of Illinois, "The approach developed in this project will provide a route to optimize material properties and CO_{2} utilization for both lab and process scales.”

Beyond research, the National Science Foundation CAREER Award also supports her commitment to increasing access to sustainability-focused research opportunities for women at various academic levels. With her outstanding efforts and contributions to her field she was awarded with the National Science Foundation Career Award in 2022. Continuing with her career she has initiated an annual graduate preparation retreat for first-year graduate women in engineering, undergraduate research opportunities, and hands-on engineering activities for K-18 girls.

As of 2024, She held the position of WiSE Gabilan Assistant Professor of Civil and Environmental Engineering at the University of Southern California. Also in the year 2024 she was selected for the Alfred P. Sloan Research Fellow in Chemistry which is one of the top research facilities in Canada and the US

In 2025, Gillard-AbdulAziz co-authored a review in Chemical Reviews examining the use of in situ and operando Raman spectroscopy to study electrode and electrolyte materials in solid oxide electrochemical cells, with the goal of improving understanding of the chemical processes that affect energy-conversion performance and durability.

== Awards ==
- 2024 Alfred P. Sloan Sloan Research Fellow
- 2023 Department of Energy Early Career Award (Materials Chemistry)
- 2022 National Science Foundation Career Award (CBET - Catalysis)
- 2022 Material Science of Extreme Environments Young Investigator Award
- 2021 Frontiers of Engineering Fellow hosted by the National Academy of Engineers
