= Ann T. Nelms =

African American nuclear physicist

- Born: 1929 (age 96–97); Waycross, Georgia
- Scientific career
- Fields: Nuclear physics
- Workplaces: National Bureau of Standards

Ann T. Nelms (born 1929) is a prominent African American nuclear physicist. Her research, which involved the study of the persistence of nuclear radioactivity, was cited in reports on nuclear fallout and human health.

== Life and career ==
Nelms was born in 1929 in Waycross, Georgia.

She worked as a nuclear physicist for National Bureau of Standards in the 1950s. She collaborated in her nuclear research with Ugo Fano, an Italian-born academician who joined the National Bureau of Standards as the bureau's first theoretical physicist after a stint at Aberdeen Proving Grounds. She also collaborated with J W Cooper, a senior research fellow with the National Bureau of Standards.

As of January 1954, she lived in the Washington, D.C., area with her husband and one-year-old child.

== Publications ==
- "Graphs of the Compton Energy-Angle Relationship and the Klein-Nishina formula from 10 Kev to 500 Mev", published in 1953, 89 pp, US Government Printing Office.
- "Energy Loss and Range of Electrons and Positrons", published in the Circular of the National Bureau of Standards, Issue 577, 1956, 30 pp, US Government Printing Office.
- "An Approximate Expression of Gamma Ray Degradation Spectra", co-authored with U Fano, published in the Journal of Research, National Bureau of Standards, Vol 59, July–December 1957, pg 122.
- "U235 Fission Product Decay Spectra at Various Times After Fission", co-authored with J W Cooper, published in Health Physics, volume 1, pg 427, 1959. It is cited extensively in "Fallout Phenomena Symposium, April 12-14, 1966, published in the proceedings of the US Naval Radiological Laboratory, USNRDL-R&L-177, June 9, 1966. It also is referenced in A Compendium of Information for Use in Controlling Radiation Emergencies, Including Lecture Notes from a Training Session at Idaho Falls, Idaho February 12-14, 1958, published September 1, 1960, by the Office of Health and Safety, Atomic Energy Commission, under sponsorship of the US Department of Energy.
- "Data on the Atomic form Factor: computation and Survey," co-authored with Irwin Oppenheim, published in Journal of Research of the National Bureau of Standards, Vol. 55, No. 1, July 1955, research Paper 2604.
