= Matilene Berryman =

American oceanographer (1920–2003)

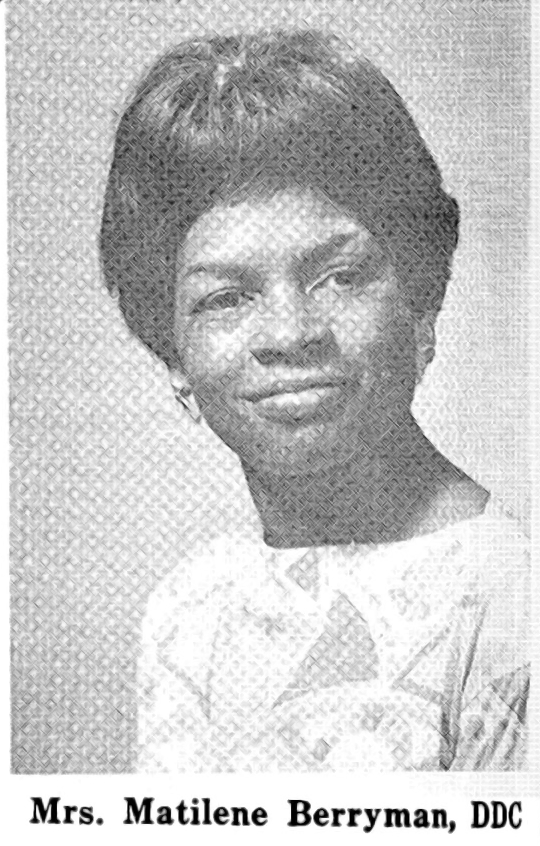
- Born: 8 December 1926; Prince Edward County
- Died: 6 May 2003 (aged 76)
- Alma mater: Howard University
- Occupation: Lawyer; oceanographer; environmentalist
- Academic career
- Institutions: University of the District of Columbia; Naval Oceanographic Office

Matilene Spencer Berryman (December 8, 1920 – May 6, 2003) was an American oceanographer and attorney. Originally from Prince Edward County, Virginia.

== Early life ==
Berryman was born in Darlington Heights, Prince Edward County, Virginia, to parents Mary and Charles Spencer. She was the fifth of nine children.

== Education and career ==
Berryman earned a baccalaureate degree in mathematics from American University and a Master's in marine affairs, concentrating in oceanography and sonar engineering from the University of Rhode Island. Berryman often found herself in the position of being the only woman in her school or place of work, with observers noting that Berryman “was the lone representative of her sex in a sonar engineering class of 46 students at Penn State University.”

In 1957, she joined the U.S. Naval Oceanographic Office in Maryland and taught courses on statistics and dynamics of the ocean and underwater sound to US and foreign naval reserve officers. Berryman was a professor of marine science at the University of the District of Columbia in Washington, D.C., and served as Chair of the Department of Environmental Sciences from 1970 to 1981.

Berryman was a major advocate of education, which led to her appointment as Physical Science Administrator in the Executive Office of the President of the National Council on Marine Research and Development. Through this appointment, she served on an ad hoc committee to develop job opportunities for minorities in the marine science and oceanography fields. Berryman was also appointed a council position at the Defense Documentation Center (DDC) where she served as the only woman on the council. Berryman was well known for her work ethic among her peers, with accounts stating, "she barely had time to organize her desk, win first place for needlework in the Centre's Home Show, and submit her first beneficial suggestion when the letter arrived". Berryman's appointment was a large part of her effort to uplift youth and minorities in the fields of oceanography and science, fields which she was passionate about.

One of Berryman's fundamental criticisms of oceanographic science institutions, in particular of 2- and 4-year universities, was a falling pace of available public education in the fields of oceanography in relation to the rapid expansion of the field. Berryman was quoted in one of her papers as saying, "In our concern for the benefits of a benevolent universe and the three E's of Environment, Energy, and Economics, we have minimized the importance of the biggest issue - the E of Education". Berryman believed that education "is the key that could truly spell the difference between abject poverty and the extreme wealth of that one percent of the population", and was passionate about expanding opportunities for public education She continued her own education by earning a law degree from Howard University.

=== Legal career ===
Berryman was admitted to the District of Columbia Bar on January 10, 1975. Shortly after, she established a legal practice in civil, environmental, and marine law. According to the National Association for Personal Injury Lawyers, she began practicing full-time as a solo practitioner in 1983. She specialized in probate law but also worked in personal injury law. Berryman was disbarred from practicing law in 2000 for commingling estate funds with her own and failing to fulfill the legal duties due to her client.

=== Publications ===
Berryman authored Lecture Notes on Underwater Sound in 1965 and Summary of Tides and Currents in 1967, both of which were published by the United States Naval Oceanographic Office. Berryman wrote a textbook entitled Science of Man's Environment: principles of science and technology for environmental, marine, engineering, and ocean science technology, which was published in 1986. Also in 1986, Berryman reorganized part of Science of Man's Environment to publish Impact of Man on the Environment: Pollution and Radiation, which is about environmental law. In 1978, Berryman published Education--The Bridge to Ocean Exploration detailing the Marine Science Technology program at the University of the District of Columbia. Berryman wrote a paper called Tidal Energy and the Energy Crisis--An Assessment of Technology and the Interrelationship in 1979, discussing the energy crisis with a focus on tidal energy.

== Family ==
Berryman had two daughters with Samuel T. Berryman, Dr. Sherrill Berryman Johnson and D'Michelle Berryman. Dr. Sherrill Berryman Johnson (1947–2010) had a career as a professor at Howard University teaching dance, established Howard University's first degree program in dance, and acted as a cultural activist by teaching and researching international dance. D'Michelle Berryman (1957–1995) worked in the marine field, was a lawyer, and an engineer. Berryman was involved with both of her children's practices and was also involved with the community through the Shiloh Baptist Church of Washington, DC.

== Death ==
She died on May 6, 2003, in Washington D.C. Her personal papers were donated to the Moorland-Spingarn Research Center in 2010.
