= Deena Pierott =

American social entrepreneur

Deena Pierott is an American social entrepreneur, public speaker, and educator who has dedicated her career to promoting diversity and creating equal opportunities for underrepresented communities. She is most well known for being the founder of iUrban Teen, a White House recognized STEM+ Arts educational program for youth of color.

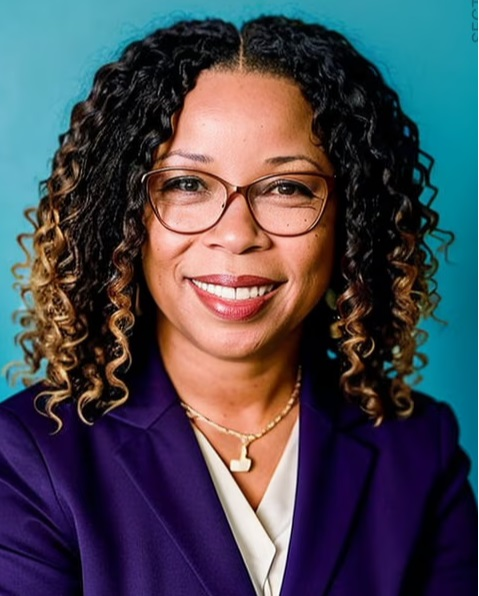
Deena Pierott

== iUrban Teen ==
In 2011, Deena Pierott created iUrban Teen to expose and inspire young underrepresented students ages 13 to 18 through a career-focused education. After observing a rising high school dropout rate while serving on the Commission on African Affairs in Washington State as a governor-appointed role, she decided to take action and create the program. Although the target demographic is Latino, Indigenous and Pacific Islanders, and African Americans, it is open to all underrepresented youth who fulfill the Non-Traditional STEM learners category. Through hands-on workshops, collaborative learning models, and exposure to careers through tours in leading businesses, the program aims to encourage students to pursue education in the STEM field and provide them with the opportunity to become leaders in today's society.

The program is based upon three pillars, of iEngage, iLearn, and iSucceed. iEngage involves engaging the youth to tech immersion events where they can gain leadership skills, discover the world of technology, and gain awareness of different career options. iLearn involves training camps and programs, which consists of learning excursions that will further their exposure to different STEM opportunities and getting them excited for secondary education. iSucceed involves implementing their knowledge through internship and mentorship opportunities, to give them a chance to showcase their skills in the real world.

== Impact ==
Through her efforts, iUrban Teen has impacted a community of over 15,000 students throughout the U.S. and Canada, and has gained recognition across institutions and industries. As seen through the program's impact report in 2021, it reports that “iUrban Teen exceeds the National Science and Technology Council’s Top five best practices for diversity and inclusion in STEM education and research.” Even then, Pierott continues to make an effort to create strong and positive diverse change through the development of new programs, locations, and partnerships. For example, Pierott is also co-founder of Black Women in Stem 2.0, an organization aiming to support black women in high-tech careers by creating inclusive workspaces. Pierott is also founder and president of Mosaic Blueprint, a recruiting, consulting, outplacement, and communications services firm that is also based upon the concepts of cultural inclusion and diversity: the main goal is to help clients create a “blueprint” for success.

== Awards and honors ==
Deena Pierott's work has led her to be nationally recognized, and has received numerous awards and honors throughout her career: Essence Magazine Top 50 Black Female Founders (2018), Essence Magazine Top Black Women in STEM (2017), Clark College Iris Award (2017), Washington State African American Achievement Award (2017), Alpha Kappa Alpha Global Impact Award (2016), Whitney M. Young Award (2015), Black Enterprise Magazine Innovator (2013), White House Champion of Change (2013), Ebony Magazine Power 100 List (2013), Rockefeller Innovation Award Nominee (2013), Business Journal Orchid Award (2013), The Delta's Woman of Excellence (2011), MED Week Minority Business of the Year (2010). She has also been featured in many publications including Government Technology, Forbes, Inc Magazine, Essence Magazine, Working Mother Magazine, Black Enterprise, Ebony Magazine, Deliver magazine, Portland Business Journal, Geekwire, Colors of Influence, Neurology Now, the Chicago Tribune and on NPR.
