= Maria Thompson =

American scientist and academic administrator

Maria Thompson is an American scientist and academic administrator who served as the 7th president of Coppin State University. She was the first female president.

== Early life and education ==
Maria Thompson is from Nashville, Tennessee. She completed a bachelor's degree at Tennessee State University (TSU). She earned a Master of Science in textiles at Ohio State University. Thompson completed a doctorate in textile science and textile economics at the University of Tennessee.

== Career ==
Thompson held research administration positions at TSU for 13 years. She was the TSU vice president for research and sponsored programs before transferring to the State University of New York at Oneonta to serve as provost and vice president for academic affairs for 4 years.

Thompson became the 7th president of Coppin State University on July 1, 2015. She is the female president of the university. After recovering from cancer, she resigned from her position in June 2019.

== Personal life ==
Thompson is a cancer survivor. She married her long-term partner, Joseph Perry, in December 2018. She resides in Nashville.

== See also ==
- List of women presidents or chancellors of co-ed colleges and universities
