= Mary James (scientist) =

Professor of physics

- Education: Hampshire College (BA); Stanford University (PhD)
- Scientific career
- Workplaces: Reed College; University of Maryland, College Park; SLAC National Accelerator Laboratory
- Thesis: Production of high intensity electron bunches for the SLAC Linear Collider (1987)

Mary B. James is an American physicist and educator. She is the Dean for Institutional Diversity and the A. A. Knowlton Professor of Physics at Reed College. James specializes in particle physics and accelerators.

== Early life and education ==
James' father was one of the Tuskegee Airmen. She earned a bachelor's in physics at Hampshire College in 1976. She completed a PhD in accelerator physics at Stanford University in 1986. She worked at SLAC National Accelerator Laboratory, designing high current electron injectors for the linear collider. She studied the longitudinal bunching of transrelativistic electron beams in high space charge forces and longitudinal wake fields. At SLAC National Accelerator Laboratory she also contributed to the polarized electron injector (PEGGY).

== Research and career ==
In 1977 James worked with Dr. R. H. Miller to design a new focusing system for SLAC's position source. In 1987 James joined University of Maryland, College Park as an assistant professor in electrical engineering. Soon thereafter she moved to Portland, Oregon, to join the faculty of the department of physics at Reed College, where she has been a faculty member since in 1988. At Reed, James has taught broadly across the physics curriculum. In 1991 she was in Stanford, California working for Stanford Linear Accelerator Center (SLAC), on a Special Projects Group.

James has been an advocate for women and minority students throughout her career. In 2013 James was announced as Dean for Institutional Diversity at Reed College. She is on the leadership team of the Liberal Arts Diversity Officers consortium. The consortium looks at how faculty can navigate incidents of bias, and develops ways to change the structure and allow them to thrive. James contains a hard core belief that the physics department should adopt a more welcoming environment for people of color, specifically African Americans in order grow the diversity in the physics community. She has served as a member and chair for the American Physical Society committee on Minorities in Physics.

She established Reed College's Center for Teaching and Learning, which looks to attract and retain women, first generation students and people of color in STEM majors. She is concerned that underrepresented minority students feel isolated on campus, and that faculty of colour invest time in mentoring for minority students which distract from the tenure process. When classes at Reed College were cancelled due to student protests over a curriculum that was "too white, male and Eurocentric", Reed appeared on public radio and national media emphasizing the need for inclusive pedagogy. As a teacher, she creates an active learning environment which makes students recognize physics does not only need straight A students.

Working with the American Institute of Physics she launched TEAM UP in April 2018, a Task Force to Elevate African American Representation in Undergraduate Physics & Astronomy. The program involved a survey, site visits and evidence-based recommendations with pilot schools. The report from the Task Force appeared in spring 2020 and identifies a number of the factors responsible for the success of African American students in physics and astronomy along with research-based recommendations for faculty and institutions to increase the representation of African Americans in these fields. The key barriers cited in the report included financial burdens, departmental culture and 'physics identity' and belonging. Comments and updates on the results of this task force have recently been published.

== Recognition ==
James was named a Fellow of the American Physical Society (APS) in 2021, after a nomination from the APS Forum on Physics and Society, "for outstanding contributions to improving access, inclusion, equity, and mentorship in physics, including as co-chair of the TEAM-UP Task Force, speaking at CUWiP conferences, and as Dean for Institutional Diversity at Reed College".
