= Desiré Whitmore =

American physicist

Desiré Delia Whitmore
- Born: 1980 (age 45–46)
- Education: Antelope Valley College (AS); University of California, Los Angeles (BS); University of California, Irvine (MS, PhD)
- Scientific career
- Doctoral advisor: Eric Potma
- Website: www.laserchick.net

Desiré Delia Whitmore (born September 8, 1980) is an American laser physicist, science communicator, and physics educator at the Exploratorium in San Francisco.

== Early life and education ==
Whitmore was raised in Southern California by her Black father, Gene, and Latina mother, Delia, alongside her full sister, before her parents separated and each had three more children, leaving her the eldest of eight siblings whom she helped raise. Whitmore developed an interest in science, technology, engineering, and mathematics (STEM) at an early age. She attended Antelope Valley College, where she earned an Associate of Science degree in physical sciences. She then transferred to the University of California, Los Angeles (UCLA), where she became active in the campus chapters of the Society of Hispanic Professional Engineers (SHPE) and the National Society of Black Engineers (NSBE) before earning her Bachelor of Science degree in chemical engineering. Whitmore went on to earn her Master of Science and Doctor of Philosophy degrees in chemical and material physics from the University of California, Irvine.

== Career ==
Whitmore's research focuses on laser spectroscopy and the development of ultrafast laser systems. Her PhD research focused on the development of very fast laser systems to study the vibrations of single molecules, electrons traveling across metal surfaces, and the fluorescence of semiconducting quantum dots. She conducted postdoctoral research at the University of California, Berkeley, where she designed and built tabletop attosecond X-ray laser systems, which produce the fastest laser pulses ever measured.

Whitmore has taught physics and laser technology courses at Irvine Valley College, and helped develop the photonics initiative at the Advanced Technology & Education Park (ATEP). She has also worked as a science curriculum specialist and developer at the Lawrence Hall of Science, where she created a science curriculum and learning materials for K–8 students. As of 2024, Whitmore is a senior physics educator at the Exploratorium, where she leads professional development workshops for middle and high school teachers.
