= Center for Earth and Planetary Studies =

Research institute at the Smithsonian Institution

The Center for Earth and Planetary Studies (CEPS) is a research center affiliated with the Smithsonian Institution. Based in Washington, DC, the Center, which was founded in 1972, conducts scientific research related to planetary science, geophysics and the biophysical environment. As a Regional Planetary Image Facility, the Center hosts NASA data including images and maps of the planets and their satellites. It also houses images taken by the Space Shuttle. These data collections are accessible to outside researchers. The Center, which is located at the National Air and Space Museum, curates one of its galleries, Exploring the Planets, as well as contributing elsewhere in the museum.

== Research ==
Among other research, the Center is studying the tectonic history of the planet Mercury, developing geological maps of Venus, researching geomorphology on Earth, studying geological processes on the icy moons of the giant planets, and exploring terrain formation on Mars.
