= Allene Johnson =

American chemist (1933–2025)

Allene Johnson (April 20, 1933 – November 2, 2025) was an American chemical educator who taught in the Summit, New Jersey school system for over 40 years.

== Life and career ==
Johnson was one of six children and grew up in the segregated American South. She attended Brunswick County, North Carolina High School and graduated from North Carolina Central University in 1954 with her B.S. degree in Chemistry. According to the book African American Women Chemists, she "..bought her chemicals and equipment from the drug store" to improvise labs for her first position as a high school teacher in Shallotte, North Carolina. She later moved to New Jersey, after a Master's degree program at Ohio State University, in 1963, where she taught in the Summit system until retiring in 1997.

Johnson died in Wilmington, North Carolina on November 2, 2025, at the age of 92.

== Championing diversity ==
The Delta Sigma Theta sorority founded the Delta Academy for maths and science, and Johnson volunteers with the New Jersey chapter which focuses on minority middle-school girls. She conducts “Chemistry for Kids” workshops to enhance the education on minority students. Johnson is also a member of the American Chemical Society Project SEED committee, where she visits schools to encourage minority students to participate in Project SEED. Johnson also provides workshops and training for minority teachers in the Newark school district. Johnson served as a judge for several science awards, notably the 2003 Chemagination awards, and has served as an educational advisor for the New Jersey ACS section for many years.

== Awards and honors ==
- 2006 - American Chemical Society Stanley Israel Award for increasing Diversity in the Chemical Sciences
- 2005 - ChemLuminary Award
- 2005 - Citation Scroll, NJSTA
- 1977 - Fellow of the New Jersey Science Teacher's Association
- Presidential Award in Science & Mathematics Teaching
- Honored with a named chemistry scholarship at Summit High School (New Jersey)
