= Rosalie A. Reed =

American veterinarian

Dr. Rosalie A. Reed
- Born: 1945 (age 80–81)
- Education: Tuskegee University
- Years active: 1973-
- Known for: First Black person to become a veterinarian at a major US zoo First woman to work as a veterinarian at the Los Angeles Zoo
- Medical career
- Profession: Veterinarian
- Institutions: Los Angeles Zoo
- Sub-specialties: Exotic animals

Rosalie A. Reed (born 1945) is an American veterinarian. In 1973, Reed became the first woman to work as a veterinarian at the Los Angeles Zoo. She was also the first African American to become a veterinarian at a major United States zoo.

== Early life ==
Reed was born in 1945 in Mount Vernon, New York, the daughter of George Reed and Rosa Lee Reed. As a young girl, she brought home stray animals and "mothered" pets, and her mother has described being unable to remember a time when Reed wasn't helping an injured animal.

== Education ==
Reed Attended Tuskegee University and worked on campus during the academic year. During the summers, she returned to New York City and worked multiple jobs in different parts of town. She was also a member of the rifle club at Tuskegee.

During college, Reed decided to specialize in exotic animals. She graduated in 1972 with a Doctor of Veterinary Medicine degree.

== Career ==
Not long after graduating, Reed applied for a veterinarian position at the Los Angeles Zoo. She completed and passed written and oral examinations, flew to Los Angeles for an interview, and was hired soon after. She was the first woman to work as a veterinarian at the Los Angeles Zoo and the first Black person to be permanently employed at a major zoo in the United States.

Reed's responsibilities at the Los Angeles Zoo included ensuring their health, monitoring their dietary needs, quarantining animals new to the zoo, and performing surgery. She earned an annual salary of $16,000 working five days a week and remaining on call for emergencies. She was responsible for 2,635 zoo animals, including a California condor she helped rehabilitate, and was assisted by Dr. William Hulsinger.

To overcome her fear of spiders, while working at the zoo Reed kept a Mexican tarantula in a glass cage on her desk.

As of April 1975, Reed was working in a private zoo.
