= Renée T. White =

American sociologist and academic administrator

- Education: Brown University; Yale University
- Scientific career
- Fields: Sociology, Black feminism, public health, social policy
- Workplaces: Purdue University; Fairfield University; Simmons University; Wheaton College; The New School

Renée T. White is an American sociologist and academic administrator serving as the provost and executive vice president for academic affairs at The New School, where she is also a tenured professor of sociology. She has held academic leadership roles at institutions including Wheaton College, Simmons University, Fairfield University, and Purdue University, and her research has addressed topics such as Black feminist theory, public health, and social policy.

== Education ==
White earned a B.A. with honors from Brown University. She completed a M.A. and a Ph.D. in sociology at Yale University, where she was awarded an Andrew W. Mellon Foundation doctoral fellowship.

== Career ==
White held a joint appointment in the department of sociology and the African American studies research center at Purdue University. At Fairfield University, she was a professor of sociology and Black studies and served as the university's first academic coordinator for diversity and global citizenship. While at Fairfield, she helped establish Service for Justice, a residential community for sophomores focused on diversity and social justice.

From 2011 to 2016, White served as dean of the College of Arts and Sciences at Simmons University, overseeing undergraduate and graduate programs. In 2016, she was appointed provost and professor of sociology at Wheaton College in Massachusetts.

On August 1, 2021, White became the provost and executive vice president for academic affairs at The New School, where she also holds a tenured position as professor of sociology at The New School for Social Research. Her responsibilities include oversight of curriculum, research, academic planning, and related services.

White is the author of Putting Risk in Perspective: Black Teenage Lives in the Era of AIDS and the co-author of Spoils of War: Women of Color, Cultures, and Revolutions. She has edited works such as Afrofuturism in Black Panther: Gender, Identity, and the Re-Making of Blackness. Additionally, she has served as editor of the Journal of HIV/AIDS Prevention in Children and Youth and as editorial advisor to the Journal of HIV/AIDS and Social Services.

Her professional activities have included a National Endowment for the Humanities Fellowship in Black film studies and participation as a Wye Faculty Fellow at the Aspen Institute. She has served on the Vision 2020 National Leadership Circle and the Chief Academic Officers Task Force of the Council of Independent Colleges from 2019 to 2021.
