= Reneé H. Moore =

American biostatistician

Reneé Helene Moore is an American biostatistician. She is a professor of research in the Drexel University Department of Epidemiology and Biostatistics, and Associate Dean for Diversity, Equity, Inclusion, and Belonging in Drexel's Dornsife School of Public Health. Her research has concerned longitudinal data, clinical trials, the biostatistics of obesity, and the science of sleep.

== Education and career ==
Moore is African American, and became a student at Bennett College, a historically black college. She graduated in 1999 with a bachelor's degree in mathematics through Bennett's secondary mathematics education program. Her interest in biostatistics began there, through participation in a Harvard Summer Program in Biostatistics and through funding from a United Negro College Fund Mellon Mays Undergraduate Fellowship. She returned to graduate study in biostatistics at Emory University in 2003, received a master's degree in 2005, and completed her Ph.D. in 2006.

She joined the Perelman School of Medicine at the University of Pennsylvania in 2006 as an assistant professor of biostatistics, in the Department of Biostatistics and Epidemiology. She moved in 2012 to North Carolina State University as an associate professor of teaching in the Department of Statistics, and in 2015 she returned to Emory University as an associate professor of research in the Department of Biostatistics and Bioinformatics, and as director of the Biostatistics Collaboration Core. She took her present position at Drexel as professor of research and director of the Biostatistics Scientific Collaboration Center in 2021, and became Associate Dean for Diversity, Equity, Inclusion, and Belonging in 2023.

Moore chaired the Committee on Minorities in Statistics of the American Statistical Association from 2013 to 2018. She was the 2024 president of the Eastern North American Region of the International Biometric Society.

== Recognition ==
Moore was named as a Fellow of the American Statistical Association in 2017.
