= Marilyn Suiter =

Geologist

- Education: Franklin and Marshall; Wesleyan University
- Awards: Geological Society of America Bromery Award; AAAS fellow
- Scientific career
- Workplaces: American Geosciences Institute; National Science Foundation

Marilyn J. Suiter was a geologist whose professional career has spanned teaching, working the oil and gas industry and public services. In her leadership roles at both the American Geosciences Institute and the National Science Foundation, Suiter worked over decades to increase the ethnic diversity of the geosciences. She died in August 2025.

== Background ==
Suiter started her undergraduate studies at Franklin & Marshall College as a Physics major and switched to geosciences because she found the interdisciplinary nature of geology more challenging and satisfying. After earning her BS degree, Suiter taught sciences for grades 5–12 in the Philadelphia public school system (1970-1977). She worked for the United States Geological Survey for four years before starting her MS studies at Wesleyan University. After earning her MS in earth science in 1981, Suiter worked in the oil and gas industry for Cities Service Oil and Gas in the early 1980s.

During the oil price crash of the mid 1980s, Suiter decided to leave the oil and gas industry. From 1987 to 1997, Suiter held several positions within the American Geosciences Institute, including director of Special Education Programs, director of Education and Human Resources, and director of Human Resources and Career Development. At the American Geosciences Institute, Suiter also led the Minority Participation Program, which was created to address the lack of ethnic diversity in the geosciences and which awards scholarships to under-represented American geoscience students every year.

Since Suiter started working for the National Science Foundation in 1998, she has led several programs within NSF that foster geosciences education and diversity. Suiter currently serves as a program director in NSF's Division of Human Resource Development.

== Service to the Discipline of Geosciences ==
Over her career, Suiter has served on numerous committees and panels of the Association for Women Geoscientists, the American Geosciences Institute, the American Association for the Advancement of Science, the American Geophysical Union, the National Science Foundation, the American Institute of Physics, the Association for Women in Science, the National Science Teaching Association, the National Association of Black Geologists and Geophysicists, and the American Educational Research Association.

Suiter's conference presentations and peer-reviewed papers address issues of geosciences education as well as diversity and inclusion within the geosciences. These include:

- Suiter, Marilyn J. (1991-03-01). "Understanding #7: Helping Pre-college Students Explore Career Options in Earth-Systems Science". Science Activities. 28 (1): 34–36. doi:10.1080/00368121.1991.9958092. ISSN 0036-8121.
- Suiter, Marilyn (1991-03-01). "The Association of Woman Geoscientists and Geoscience Education". Journal of Geological Education. 39 (2): 106–108. doi:10.5408/0022-1368-39.2.106. ISSN 0022-1368.
- Suiter, Marilyn J.; Patino, Lina C. (2012). "Geoscience Workforce for 21st Century Challenges". AAPG Datapages: 623–627.

== Honors ==
- 2018 Geological Society of America Distinguished Service Award
- 2018 American Geosciences Institute Explorer Award
- 2010 Geological Society of America Bromery Award
- 2007 Fellow of the American Association for the Advancement of Science
- 1994 Association of Women Geoscientists Distinguished Service Award
- 1988 President of the Association for Women Geoscientists
- Fellow of the Geological Society of America
- Fellow of the Association for Women in Science
