= Amanda Bryant-Friedrich =

American chemist

Amanda C. Bryant-Friedrich
- Born: Enfield, North Carolina
- Education: North Carolina Central University (BS); Duke University (MS); Heidelberg University (PhD)
- Awards: Fellow of the: American Association for the Advancement of Science (2019); American Chemical Society (2018)
- Scientific career
- Workplaces: University of Toledo; Oakland University; Wayne State University
- Thesis: Synthesen und Eigenschaften von alkinylsubstituierten 1 (1997)
- Doctoral advisor: Richard Neidlein

Amanda Cordelia Bryant-Friedrich is the dean of the graduate school and a professor in the college of pharmacy and health sciences at Wayne State University. She was awarded the 2014 American Chemical Society Stanley C. Israel Regional Award for Advancing Diversity in the Chemical Sciences and is a Fellow of the American Association for the Advancement of Science and the American Chemical Society. Her research considers modified nucleic acids and biomarkers of disease.

== Early life and education ==
Bryant-Friedrich was born in Enfield, North Carolina. She is the daughter of a farmer and, alongside her education in the Halifax County School system, worked on the family farm. She graduated high school as Valedictorian and moved on to attend university. Whilst she was offered a full academic scholarship at Duke University, she was encouraged by her guidance counsellor to attend North Carolina Central University. She eventually earned her bachelor's degree in chemistry at North Carolina Central University, where she worked in the laboratory of John Meyers. She became increasingly interested in scientific research and spent a summer holiday as an intern at Dow Chemical Company. She eventually graduated magna cum laude with a bachelor's degree in chemistry. She moved to Duke University for her graduate studies, and spent two years trying to prove to the department that she would be able to complete a PhD. She eventually earned a master's degree in the department of chemistry and began her doctoral research with Richard Polniaszek. Six months after starting, Polniaszek left the university, leaving Byrant-Friedrich to find a new project. In 1993, after several weeks of German lessons, Byrant-Friedrich moved to Heidelberg University for her doctoral research. She worked on organic chemistry under the supervision of Richard Neidlein and completed her PhD in 1997. Her doctoral research involved the synthesis of complex aromatic compounds.

== Research and career ==
In 1997 Byrant-Friedrich joined the research laboratory of Bernd Giese at the University of Basel as a postdoctoral fellow. Here, she became interested in the use of organic chemistry as a means to study biological mechanisms. After spending two years in Switzerland, Byrant-Friedrich moved back to the United States. Shortly after returning, Bryant-Friedrich worked at Wayne State University, but when it became obvious that she would not be awarded a tenure-track position, she looked for other options.

Byrant-Friedrich joined Oakland University as an assistant professor in 2000. She was awarded a National Science Foundation CAREER Award in 2003, which allowed her to study the chemical processes that damage DNA and RNA. She moved to the University of Toledo in 2007.

Bryant-Friedrich was elected to serve as a 2022 chair in the American Chemical Society Medical Division of Medicinal Chemistry (ACS MEDI).

She studies the mechanisms by which small molecules interact with nucleic acid. Her research involves the synthesis of modified nucleosides and nucleotides, monitoring the intercalation of small aromatic systems into DNA via the design of novel chromophores and the creation of probes that contain nucleic acids to study events that occur around DNA. She has studied the protection of small nuclear RNA (snRNAs) from oxidative damage, which typically damages cells. As snRNA is essential for the function of spliceosome, this type of damage can impact the structure and function of the spliceosome.

=== Academic service ===
In 2016 it was announced that Byrant-Friedrich would become the dean of the college of graduate studies at the University of Toledo. She holds various honorary positions, including commissioner for the Lake Erie Commission. She has simultaneously held leadership roles in the American Chemical Society Division of Toxicology and Medicinal Chemistry. Alongside her research and administrative duties, Byrant-Friedrich works to support women and minority scientists.

In 2020, Bryant-Friedrich was named the dean of the graduate school at Wayne State University. Additionally, she was hired to teach at Wayne State's College of Pharmacy and Health Sciences, where she would run a laboratory to conduct research.

=== Awards and honours ===
Her awards and honours include:

- 2015 University of Toledo University Women's Commission
- 2018 Elected a Fellow of the American Chemical Society
- 2019 Girl Scouts of Western Ohio Women of Distinction
- 2019 Fellow of the American Association for the Advancement of Science
- 2020 YWCA Northwest Ohio Milestone Award for science

=== Personal life ===
Byrant-Friedrich was profiled in African American Women Chemists in the Modern Era. Oxford University Press. 8 August 2018. ISBN 9780190615185. She is married to Klaus Friedrich with whom she has two children.
