= Rubye Prigmore Torrey =

African American chemist and educator

Rubye Mayette Prigmore Torrey (February 18, 1926 – October 26, 2017) was a notable African American female chemist and educator. She earned her bachelor's and master's degree at Tennessee State University and her PhD from Syracuse University. Her main research interests included food chemistry, the electroanalysis of drinking water and human hair, and research ethics. She is known for developing a mechanism to decompose hydrogen sulfide, which earned her a place in Sigma Xi.

She is well known for her influence and work as a student, professor, and researcher at Tennessee State University, where she established a chemistry research laboratory and founded “Research Day,” which is now a week long annual event. Torrey was an active participant in the American Society for the Advancement of Science and was an important member of the Women Chemist Committee and Committee on Safety for the American Chemical Society, where she retains Emeritus membership.

== Early life and education ==
Rubye Prigmore Torrey, the last of three girls, was born in Sweetwater, Tennessee to parents Olivia Lee Mayette Prigmore and Professor C. Claiborne. Torrey's father died when she was an infant, so she was primarily raised by her mother and grandfather. Her grandfather played a very influential role in her and her sisters lives. From early on, he encouraged her interests in science and inspired her love of nature through his job as a farmer.

She was encouraged to study chemistry by her high school chemistry teacher in Sweetwater. Her higher education began at Swift Memorial Junior College, a Presbyterian school in Rogersville, Tennessee. She attended the small boarding school for two years before transferring to Tennessee State University (then the Tennessee Agricultural and Industrial State University). In 1946, Torrey earned her Bachelor's of Science with high honors, majoring in chemistry. She was awarded a scholarship, allowing her to extend her studies at Tennessee State University. In 1948, she achieved her Master's degree—graduating with honors again. For her masters project, Torrey completed sponsored research concerning domestic fruits and vegetables for the Tennessee Valley Authority.

Torrey later became the first African American female to earn a PhD in radiation-electroanalytical chemistry from Syracuse University in 1968. Her thesis focused on research concerning unknown material and was titled “A Mechanism for the Alpha Radiolysis of Gaseous Hydrogen Sulfide”. On the 50th anniversary of her graduation, her achievement was commemorated with a plaque dedication ceremony at the University of Syracuse.

== Research and career ==
=== Research during education ===
Torrey's research in radiation and electroanalytical chemistry began through her work for her master's thesis. She described this research in the publication, Sisters in Science: Conversations with Black Women about Race, Gender, and Their Passion for Science, by author Diann Jordan stating, “I developed a chemical method for quantitative determination of incipient spoilage of fruits and vegetables indigenous to the state of Tennessee. It was an aeration method that measured the quantity of volatile reducing substances in fruits and vegetables at different stages of maturity."

Before earning her PhD from Syracuse, Torrey began her work at Tennessee State University, where she was an assistant professor in chemistry (1948-1963). While attending Syracuse, she worked as a chemistry instructor to fund her schooling (1963-1968). Her doctorate research was concentrated on alpha radiolysis of gaseous hydrogen sulfide, which was unknown at the time and inspired her postdoctoral interests. Her research at Syracuse led to her induction into the universities Research Honor Society of Sigma Xi.

=== Career after education ===
Dr. Torrey worked as a professor of chemistry at Tennessee State University from 1969 to 1970. Torrey's next step in her research was at Brookhaven National Laboratory. In the mass spectrometry sector, Torrey achieved funding for her work in this position through a postdoctoral collaborative research grant from the Atomic Energy Commission. Holding this research position from 1970-1974, Torrey and her team conducted revolutionary studies that had yet to be investigated in the realm of applying mass spectrometry to analyze specific noble gasses patterns of gaseous formation.

==== Research Week ====
During her professorship and research status at Tennessee State University, Torrey was an extreme advocate for the advancement of student research. She served on the University Research Committee, and further used her funding from the Atomic Energy Commission to bring together the Committee of the College of Arts and Sciences. Through this committee and the funding of her grant, she created “Research Day” in 1978. The “University-Wide Research Symposium” was enacted with the goal of providing students with research experience rather than solely professors and faculty. Past this, Torrey and her committee were looking to give students experience in presenting their research professionally beyond just experience in lab work. As the College of Arts and Sciences did not have the funds for such an event, Torrey approached the First American National Bank, Third National Bank, and Citizens Saving Bank, who all contributed towards the project. Prize money for the students was provided by the Committee members themselves. After the success of the first edition, Torrey applied for and received a grant from the National Science Foundation for the "Technologically Assisted Physical Science" program, with the aim of increasing the number of students graduating with chemistry, physics and mathematics degrees.

The program has since expanded to “Research Week” and is held yearly at the university. In 2005, Torrey also launched a successful Inaugural Student Research Day at Tennessee Technological University.

==== Work in ethics ====
After spending some time as a chemist for the National Institute of Standards and Technology (formerly known as the National Bureau of Standards), Torrey returned to the college realm as a chemistry professor and assistant vice president for research at Tennessee Technological University. Lacking a laboratory for her research at this institution, Torrey started the Ethics in Science and Technology Division of the Tennessee Academy of Science, where she held the role of research administrator and chair. According to Torrey, “This section is very concerned with ethics being made an intricate part of research training and making it a part of the scientific curriculum.” During this time, Dr. Torrey also developed proposals with the faculty, advised them on available funds compatible with their research interests, and organised proposal development workshops for the faculty and administrators. She was the Executive Officer for two federally regulated institutional committees: "The Use of Human Subjects in Research" and "The Use of Experimental Animals in Research". She was also granted funding for a state-wide conference on "Human Subjects in Research" that included internationally acclaimed speakers.

Torrey collaborated with her daughter on ethics research: at the one hundred tenth meeting of the Tennessee Academy of Sciences, they presented an abstract titled: "Concern or Orwellian Nightmare: Emerging Ethical Issues".

Under Dr. Torrey's guidance, the Sigma Xi Club on the Tennessee Technological University campus became a valid chapter.

For many years, Dr. Torrey was a reviewer for Federal government agencies, and evaluated proposals for the National Science Foundation and the Department of Education. Upon her retirement from academia, Torrey started a consulting business.

== Personal life ==
Torrey was an active Presbyterian throughout her life and was specifically very involved in the First Presbyterian Church of Nashville for forty plus years. She sang in the choir there for 45 years and served on a number of different committees as a deacon and an elder.

In September 1957, Rubye married husband Claude A. Torrey and later had two children, daughter Claudia O. Torrey and son Michael Torrey. Mr. Torrey was a biologist and biochemist, who had graduated from the school of Medical Technology of Meharry Medical School. Rubye credits him as an important and helpful influencer in her scientific career, stating, “We worked as a team. I feel like this is the only way one can balance a family and career in science, particularly in chemistry. Set your goals, make your plan, and work your plan”.

Torrey died on October 26, 2017, at the age of 91.

== Race and gender ==
In an interview published in Sisters in Science: Conversations with Black Women about Race, Gender, and Their Passion for Science, author and interviewer Diann Jordan questions Torrey about her intersectional status as an African American, female scientist. She expresses her struggles in identifying her equal access to opportunities, never knowing if she is withheld from access due to sexism and racism or if they were truly legitimate reasons. One of her most notable statements follows, “Our acceptance as scientists is what is needed. We do not need to be viewed as black scientists or Negro scientists or African American Scientists; we need to be simply accepted as scientists...This is the link that is missing and must be supplied of we and the generations that follow are to reach the level of being all we can be.” Torrey believes the key to bringing black women into the sciences is increased visibility through mentorship by those already in the field.
