= Giovonnae Anderson =

American electrical engineer

- Born: Giovonnae Dennis
- Occupation: Electrical Engineer
- Known for: One of the first African-American women to earn a Ph.D. in electrical engineering, and one of the few at a primarily white institution.
- Notable work: Software Tailoring
- Website: https://www.software-tailoring.com/

Giovonnae Anderson (formerly Giovonnae Dennis) is an American electrical engineer. Dr. Anderson started her own business called Software Tailoring. She graduated from Hampton University, Cornell University, and the University of California, Davis. Dr. Anderson also won awards through the years in school.

== Educational Background ==
Anderson obtained a bachelor's degree in physics at Hampton University, her master's in electrical engineering at Cornell University, and a doctorate at University of California, Davis. In 1979, she became one of the first African American women to earn a Ph.D. in electrical engineering and one of the few at a primarily white institution rather than a historically Black college or university (HBCU). Later, Dr. Anderson went back to school and got a certificate in fashion studies at Santa Rosa Junior College.

== Career ==
Anderson started out working on microprocessor designs at International Business Machines (IBM) from 1972-1979. Later, she went to work at Hewlett-Packard (1979-2002), where she designed microwave, RF, and optical test equipment. Anderson was a campus recruitment manager during this time (1991-2001) as well and was able to move UC Davis from #20 to #1 in schools who had students work for HP Inc. and Agilent Technologies. She is also an advocate for women and people of color in science and engineering. She also worked at Agilent Technologies as a development engineer handling custom satellite systems. Then she taught at the University of San Francisco, teaching about technology programs. After that, she went on to be an RF and microwave consultant at Clear Steam Technologies Custom Systems, helping with circuit designs from 2005 to 2010. In 2016, she founded her business, Software Tailoring, which uses 3D body scans to provide patterns for tailoring and custom clothing design.

== Awards ==
Dr. Anderson received many awards while at the University of California, Davis. These awards are the Distinguished Alumni Award (1997), the Citation for Excellence UC Davis Alumni Award (1997), the Outstanding Internship Sponsor Award (1999), and the Outstanding Minority Women "Women Who Make a Difference" Award from the National Women of Color Conference (2001).
