= LeShawndra Price =

American psychologist

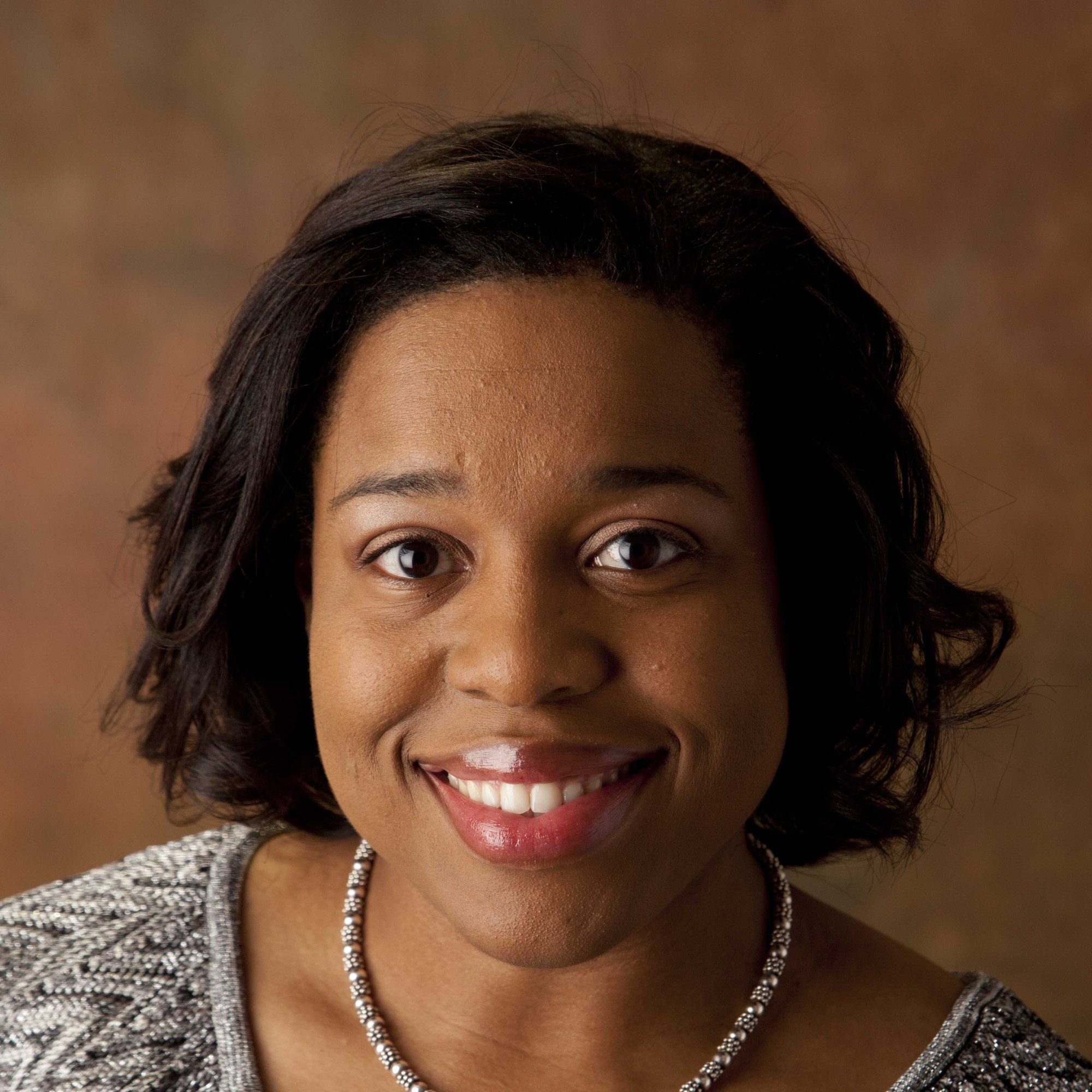
- Born: LeShawndra N. Price
- Education: Wake Forest University; University of North Carolina at Chapel Hill
- Scientific career
- Fields: Psychology, mental health, health disparities
- Workplaces: National Institutes of Health
- Thesis: Competence in Inner City and Rural African American Adolescents (2001)

LeShawndra N. Price is an American psychologist specialized in mental health and health disparities research. She is the director of the office of research training and special programs at the National Institute of Allergy and Infectious Diseases.

== Education ==
Price completed a B.A. in psychology from Wake Forest University and an M.A. and Ph.D. in developmental psychology from the University of North Carolina at Chapel Hill. Her 2001 dissertation was titled Competence in Inner City and Rural African American Adolescents.

== Career ==
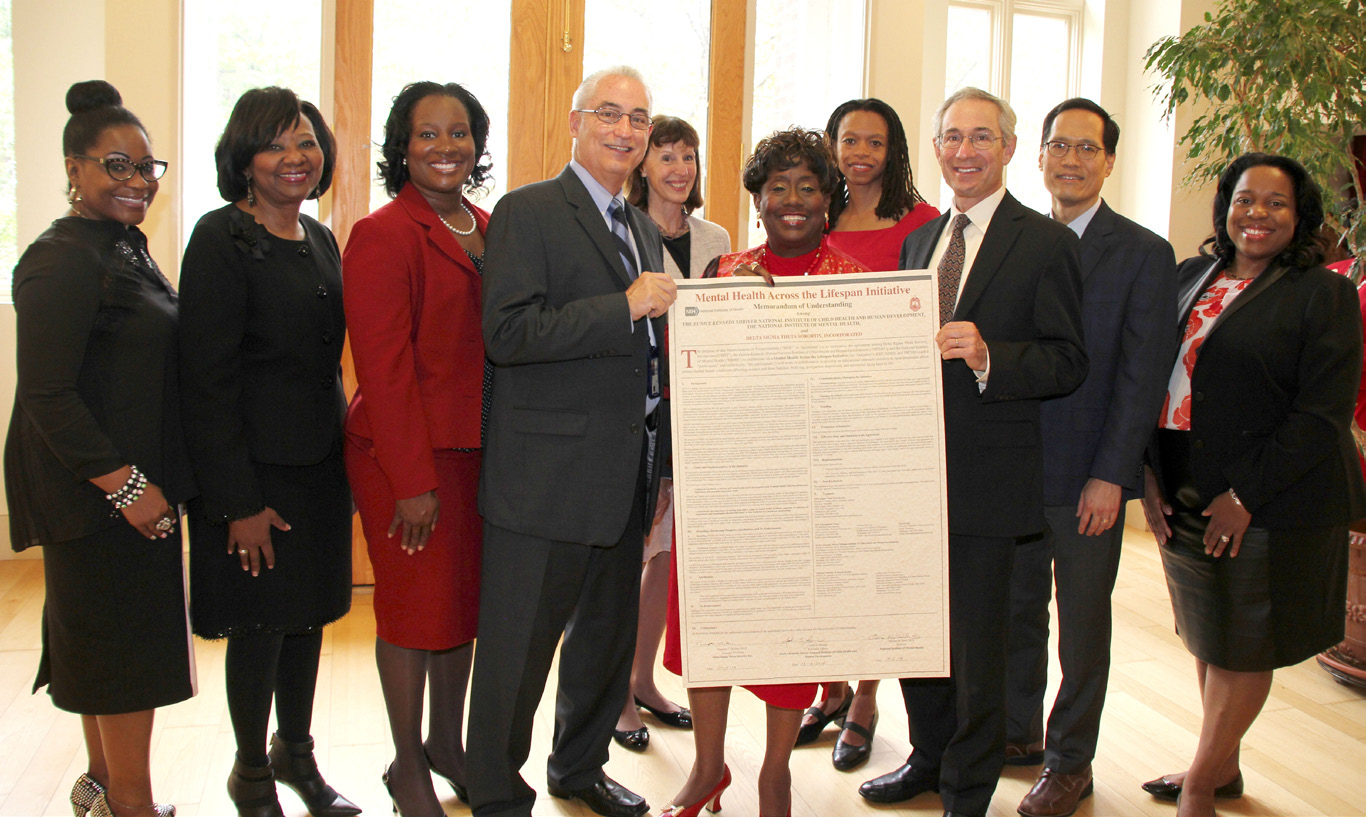
Mental Health Across the Lifespan Initiative by NIH and Delta Sigma Theta. Price far right.

Price held positions at the Carolina Power & Light Company, Burroughs-Wellcome, Research and Evaluation Associates, the University of North Carolina at Chapel Hill, Duke University, George Washington University, and North Carolina Central University.

Price served as a health scientist administrator at the National Institute on Drug Abuse where she managed federal grant funding related to health disparities, and family processes and early risks for drug use. She was later chief of the research scientist development program in the office for research on disparities and global mental health at the National Institute of Mental Health (NIMH). In this position, she managed research and research training programs and makes policy recommendations that focus on assuring increased emphasis on the mental health needs of women, racial and ethnic minority, rural, and underrepresented and underserved populations both within and outside of the United States. Price was the project scientist for an initiative designed to improve treatments and expand access to mental health care in more than 20 low- and middle-income countries, including Brazil, Peru, Nigeria, South Africa, Ghana, India, and Pakistan. She was also one of the NIHs coordinators of the Mental Health Across the Lifespan Initiative, a collaboration between the NIH and Delta Sigma Theta to raise awareness about mental health conditions affecting women and their families, including bullying, postpartum depression, and successful aging later in life.

Price is the director of the office of research training and special programs at the National Institute of Allergy and Infectious Diseases.

== Selected works ==
- Hahn, Robert; McGowan, Angela; Liberman, Akiva; Crosby, Alex; Fullilove, Mindy; Johnson, Robert; Moscicki, Eve; Price, LeShawndra; Snyder, Susan; Tuma, Farris; Lowy, Jessica (2007). "Effects on Violence of Laws and Policies Facilitating the Transfer of Youth from the Juvenile to the Adult Justice System: A Report on Recommendations of the Task Force on Community Preventive Services". Morbidity and Mortality Weekly Report: Recommendations and Reports. 56 (9): 1–11. ISSN 1057-5987. JSTOR 24842346.
- Hahn, Robert; Fuqua-Whitley, Dawna; Wethington, Holly; Lowy, Jessica; Crosby, Alex; Fullilove, Mindy; Johnson, Robert; Liberman, Akiva; Moscicki, Eve; Price, LeShawndra; Snyder, Susan (August 2007). "Effectiveness of Universal School-Based Programs to Prevent Violent and Aggressive Behavior". American Journal of Preventive Medicine. 33 (2): S114–S129. doi:10.1016/j.amepre.2007.04.012. PMID 17675013.
- Wethington, Holly R.; Hahn, Robert A.; Fuqua-Whitley, Dawna S.; Sipe, Theresa Ann; Crosby, Alex E.; Johnson, Robert L.; Liberman, Akiva M.; Mościcki, Eve; Price, LeShawndra N.; Tuma, Farris K.; Kalra, Geetika (September 2008). "The Effectiveness of Interventions to Reduce Psychological Harm from Traumatic Events Among Children and Adolescents". American Journal of Preventive Medicine. 35 (3): 287–313. doi:10.1016/j.amepre.2008.06.024. PMID 18692745.
