= African-American women in computer science =

African-American women in computer science were among early pioneers in computing in the United States, and there are notable African-American women working in computer science.

== History ==
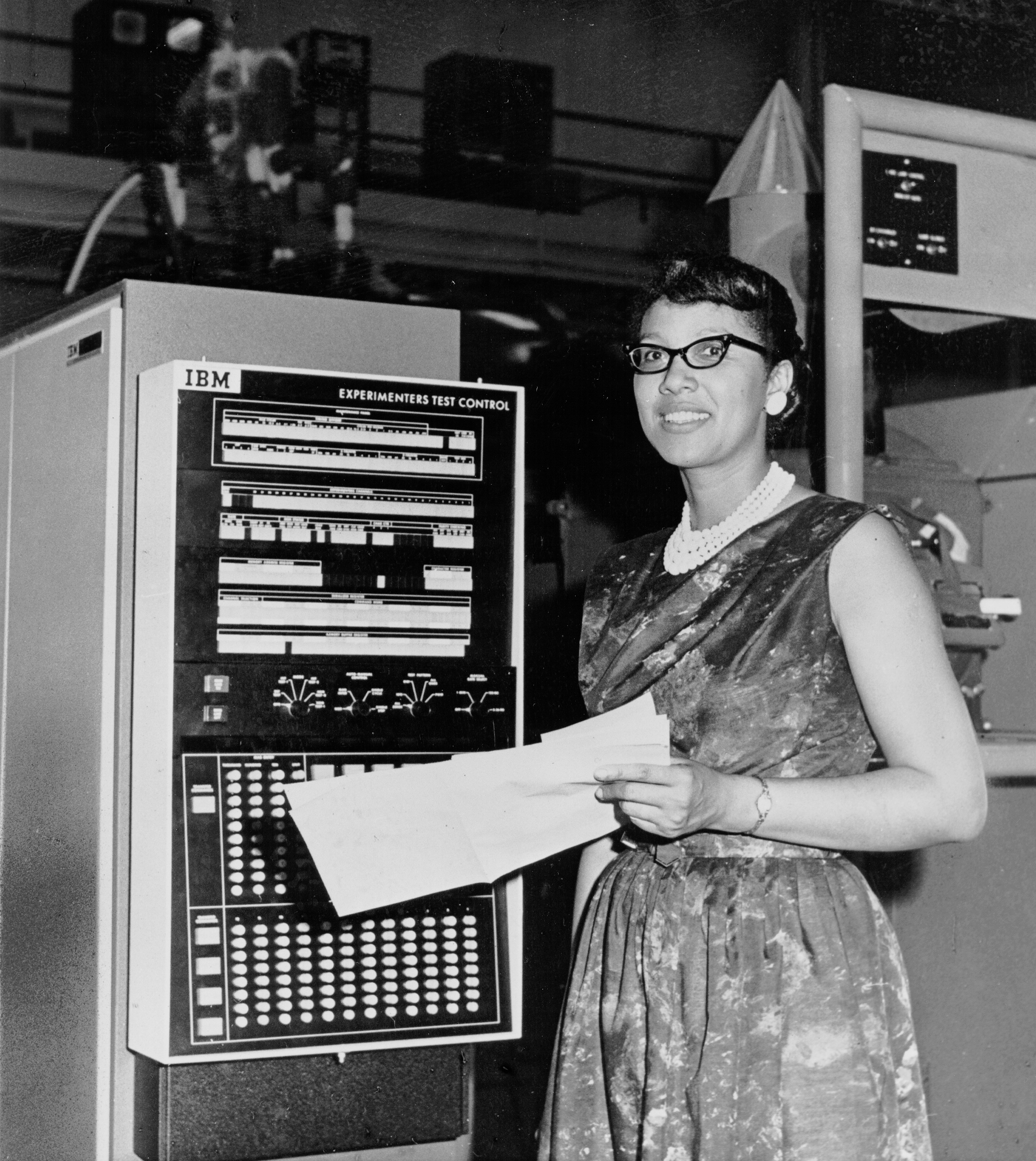
Melba Roy Mouton, an early programmer at NASA

African-American women were hired as mathematicians to do technical computing needed to support aeronautical and other research. They included such women as Katherine G. Johnson and Dorothy Vaughan, who had careers of decades at NASA. Among Johnson's projects was calculating the flight path for the United States' first mission into space in 1961. She is credited as co-author of 26 scientific papers. The practice in 1960 was to list only the head of the division as author. The crediting of Johnson as an author in a peer-reviewed NASA report is significant.

Black women were also among the ENIAC programmers, who programmed the first digital computer for the US Army. Their stories have not been documented. Given the dearth of information regarding the contributions of women in early computer science, it is likely that other Black women have made significant contributions to computer science and society.

The Association for Computing Machinery (ACM) was founded in 1947, but computer science developed later as an academic field. In 1969, Clarence "Skip" Ellis became the first Black man to earn a doctorate degree in computer science. In 1981, Deborah Washington Brown became the first Black woman to earn a doctorate degree in computer science (then part of the applied mathematics program) from Harvard University. A year later, in 1982 Marsha R. Williams further integrated the field when she earned her doctorate degree in computer science.

In the mid-1980s, the representation of women in computer science peaked at approximately 40%. The decline in the representation of women has been attributed by some analysts to the increased marketing of personal computers and video games to boys.

There has been a decline in women of all races in computing in the United States; the representation of Black women in the field has continued to be lower than that of white female peers. For example, in 1985 when the number of women in computing was at a high, 77% of the related degrees were earned by White women, while fewer than 8% were earned by Black women. In 2002, 1.3% of the computer science doctorate degrees earned were awarded to Black women. In 2017, two female computer scientists Timnit Gebru and Rediet Abebe founded the workshop Black in AI, in order to help increase the presence and inclusion of Black people in the field of artificial intelligence (AI).

== Statistics ==
The representation of black women in computer science has been historically low. The Integrated Postsecondary Education Data System (IPEDS) reports the following data:

Computer Science Degree Completion Rates for Black and White Women (from IPEDS Completion Survey by Race)
Year	Black Women (degrees)	White Women (degrees)
1977	139 (BS), 26 (MS), 0 (PhD)	1,275 (BS), 364 (MS), 18 (PhD)
1987	1,536 (BS), 81 (MS), 1 (PhD)	9,388 (BS), 1,488 (MS), 40 (PhD)
1997	1,179 (BS), 182 (MS), 1 (PhD)	3,599 (BS), 965 (MS), 66 (PhD)
2007	1,624 (BS), 345 (MS), 12 (PhD)	3,620 (BS), 1,141 (MS), 81 (PhD)

Between 1977 and 2013 (the years in which data has been recorded by the NCES), the greatest number of Black women to earn a doctorate degree in computer science in one year was 10 (2008).

In 2012, the Computing Research Association (CRA) Taulbee Survey reported there were "merely 56 Black/African American computer science tenure-track faculty members at PhD-granting institutions, which includes 12 (or 0.6%), 21 (or 1.4%), and 23 (or 3.0%) Full, Associate, and Assistant Professors, respectively."

== Notable persons ==
The following is a list of notable Black women in computer science, in alphabetical order by last name:

- Rediet Abebe
- Donna Auguste
- Erica Baker
- Carlotta Berry
- Aisha Bowe
- Khalia Braswell
- Meredith Broussard
- Deborah Washington Brown
- Quincy K. Brown
- Kimberly Bryant
- Joy Buolamwini
- Marian Croak
- Shaundra Daily
- Christine M. Darden
- Elaine Denniston
- Tawanna Dillahunt
- Annie Easley
- Carol Espy-Wilson
- Timnit Gebru
- Lisa Gelobter
- Evelyn Boyd Granville
- Ayanna Howard
- Mary Jackson
- Katherine Johnson
- Angie Jones
- Elva Jones
- Stacey Franklin Jones
- Janez Lawson
- Miriam D. Mann
- Brandeis Marshall
- Yeshimabeit Milner
- Melba Roy Mouton
- Virginia Newell
- Victoria Chibuogu Nneji
- Andrea Grimes Parker
- Kristen Ransom
- Lyndsey Scott
- Nashlie Sephus
- Window Snyder
- Latanya Sweeney
- Valerie Taylor
- Jakita O. Thomas
- Dorothy Vaughan
- Talitha Washington
- Alicia Nicki Washington
- Gladys West
- Ihudiya Finda Williams
- Marsha Rhea Williams

== Representation in other media ==
- Margot Lee Shetterly's 2016 book, Hidden Figures: The Story of the African-American Women Who Helped Win the Space Race recounts the achievements of Katherine Johnson, Christine M. Darden, and other African-American women at NASA. It was adapted as a feature film, Hidden Figures, released in 2016. It stars Taraji P. Henson as Katherine G. Johnson, Octavia Spencer as Dorothy Vaughan, and Janelle Monáe as Mary Jackson, an engineer. Kevin Costner has a supporting role.

== See also ==
- Black in AI
- Baddies in Tech
- Data for Black Lives
- List of computer scientists
- List of African American women in STEM fields
