= Kathryn Peddrew =

Scientist

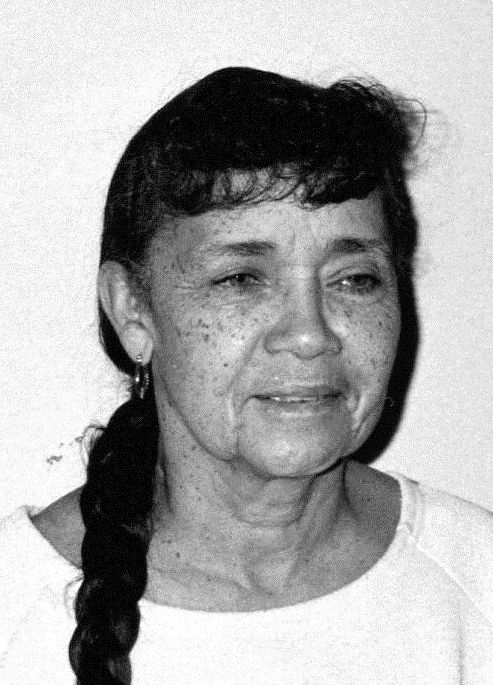
- Born: June 14, 1922; Martinsburg, WV
- Died: March 4, 2012 (aged 89)
- Education: Storer College

Kathryn Peddrew (June 14, 1922 – March 4, 2012) was an African-American mathematician, engineer, and scientist who played a crucial role in the National Advisory Committee for Aeronautics (NACA) and the National Aeronautics and Space Administration (NASA). She was one of the African-American women who worked as a "human computer" at NACA's Langley Research Center in the 1940s and 1950s.

== Early life and education ==
Peddrew was born on June 14, 1922 in Martinsburg, West Virginia. She attended Storer College in her home state of West Virginia. She focused her studies on chemistry and graduated with a chemistry degree in 1943. After college, she began looking for research opportunities. Her first choice was to travel with one of her former professors to New Guinea to study quinine deafness. Unfortunately, these plans fell through as the research program had made no plans for female housing.

== Career at NACA and NASA ==
Peddrew saw an advertisement from NACA (eventually known as NASA) saying that they were hiring chemists. At the time, there was a large increase in women being hired by NACA due to men going overseas to fight in WWII. She decided to apply for this position and was hired. However, when she arrived at the job, she was relocated to the West Area Computing Unit after it was discovered that she was African American. There she worked in the all-black West Building at NACA.

She and her colleagues were referred to as the “West Computers”, a group that consisted of Dorothy Vaughn, Mary Jackson, Miriam Daniel Mann, and Peddrew herself. Here she conducted aeronautical and aerospace research, doing the majority of her work in the Instrument Research Division. The unit was responsible for performing complex calculations that were critical to various aeronautical research projects. Despite facing racial segregation and discrimination, Peddrew and her colleagues persisted in their work and contributed to the development of supersonic flight, as well as the early stages of the space race, including Project Mercury and the Apollo missions. In addition to her role as a "human computer," Peddrew also worked as an aerospace technologist, conducting research on various projects at NACA and later, NASA.

Peddrew spent her entire 43-year career at NACA/NASA, ultimately retiring in 1986.

== Legacy and recognition ==
Peddrew's story, along with those of her colleagues Katherine Johnson, Dorothy Vaughan, and Mary Jackson, was brought to the public's attention through Margot Lee Shetterly's book "Hidden Figures: The American Dream and the Untold Story of the Black Women Mathematicians Who Helped Win the Space Race" in 2016. The book was adapted into the critically acclaimed film "Hidden Figures" the same year.

Peddrew and her fellow "human computers" have since been recognized for their groundbreaking work at NASA, inspiring future generations of scientists, engineers, and mathematicians, particularly women and people of color, to pursue careers in STEM fields.
