= Winta Zesu =

Ethiopian influencer (born 2000)

- Born: Winta Zesu; November 1, 2000 (age 25); Addis Ababa, Ethiopia
- Occupations: influencer; YouTuber

Instagram information
- Page: wintazesu
- Followers: 177,000 (April 9, 2025)

TikTok information
- Page: winta_zesu
- Followers: 921,000 (April 9, 2025)

YouTube information
- Channel: Winta Zesu
- Years active: 2019–present
- Subscribers: 238,000 (April 9, 2025)
- Views: 237 million (April 9, 2025)

Winta Zesu (born November 1, 2000) is an Ethiopian influencer and YouTuber. She rose to prominence through her satirical rage-bait content on TikTok and YouTube, where she portrays a comedic videos.

== Life and career ==
Zesu was on born on the 1st of November 2000, in Addis Adaba, Ethiopia and later moved to the United States in 2017 to pursue a college education and later graduated with a pre-medical degree. She first moved to Kentucky for undergraduate school but later relocated to New York City for a gap year before she graduate at school. During her gap year, she began posting content online.

Zesu began her YouTube channel and TikTok account in late 2019, her channel namely "wintazesu" has since reached around 238,000 subscribers and 237 million total views. On TikTok, she's gathered over 760,000 followers with outrage provoking skits for comedic effect. Zesu describes her work as satire, crafted to provoke strong emotional reactions rage-bait has become her trademark. In 2023, she earned approximately $150,000 from engagements and platform monetization. By 2025, she was one of the Top 50 content creators based in New York.

== Accolades ==
Year	Association	Category	Nominated works	Result	Ref.
2025	MEFeater Magazine & Baddies in Tech	Women To Watch Top 100 List	Herself	Honoured	
