= West Area Computers =

All-black female human computer group at the NACA Langley Research Center

West Area Computing Unit
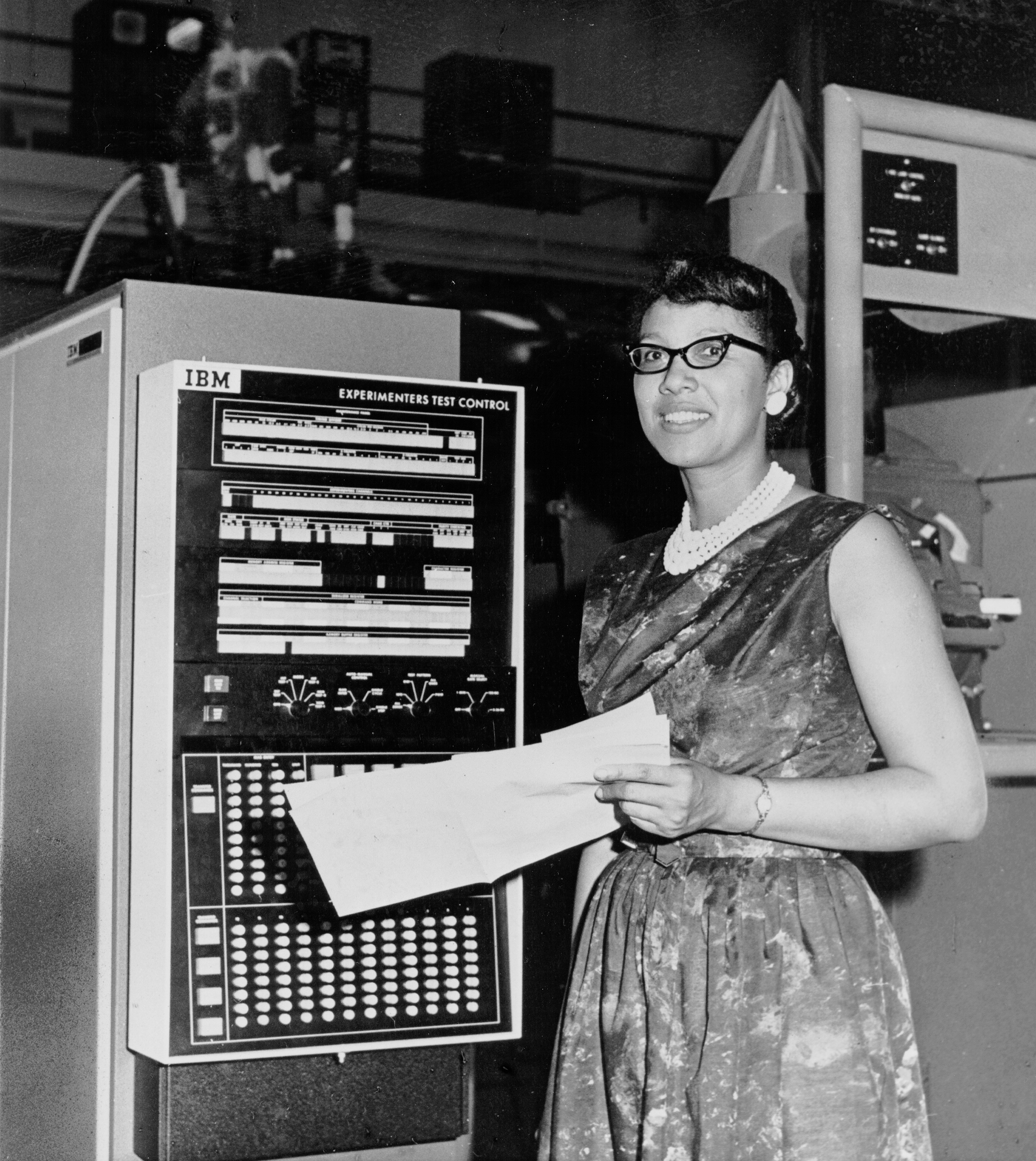
- Melba Roy
- Other names: West Computers, West Area Computers
- Occupation: human computers
- Years active: 1943–1958

The West Area Computers (short for West Area Computing Unit) were the African American women who worked as human computers at the Langley Research Center of NACA (predecessor of NASA) from 1943 through 1958. Most of their work involved reading, analyzing, and plotting data for aircraft testing, supersonic flight research, and, later, the space program. In the era before digital computers, they worked by hand, one-on-one with engineers or in computing sections.

== History ==
The West Area Computers were a subset of the hundreds of women who began careers in aeronautical research during World War II. As men joined the war effort, many U.S. organizations began recruiting and hiring more women and minorities. In 1935, five women worked as computers in the Langley Research Center; by 1946, about 400 did. All were discriminated against for their gender: although the women were as skilled as their male counterparts, they were hired as "subprofessionals" with starting pay of $1,440 annually (about $27,000 in 2025), while men held "professional" status and received starting pay of $2,600 annually (about $48,000 in 2025).

The West Computers were further discriminated against for their race. Although Executive Order 8802 had in principle outlawed discriminatory hiring practices in defense industries, Virginia's Jim Crow laws overpowered it and made it more difficult for African American women to be hired than white women. To become a human computer for NACA, all applicants had to pass a civil service exam, but only Black applicants were required to complete a chemistry course at the nearby Hampton Institute. Once they were hired, Black computers performed the same work as the white women, and sometimes in teams with them, but were required to use segregated work areas, bathrooms, and cafeterias. The West Computers got their name because they were required to work at Langley's West Area, while the white mathematicians worked in the East section. Some of the white computers were unaware of the West Computers, although black and white computers recalled that when computers from both groups were assigned to a project, "everyone worked well together", according to an unpublished study by Beverly E. Golemba.

=== Protesting segregation ===
Some of the West Computers engaged in small acts of protest against segregation at Langley. Many small protests occurred in the segregated dining room since colored women were forbidden to enter the white cafeteria. Miriam Mann repeatedly removed signs denoting where "coloured girls" could sit for their meals. Both Katherine Johnson and Mary Winston Jackson refused to use the segregated cafeterias and exclusively ate at their desks. Katherine Johnson also refused to use segregated restrooms since they were on the opposite side of the campus, so she used an unmarked restroom. After discovering that the men on her team were attending meetings to share important information about their tasks, Katherine Johnson began attending these meetings uninvited. She participated heavily during these meetings by frequently asking questions and engaging in discussions.

Christine Darden became an engineer after demonstrating that she possessed or exceeded all skills and qualifications male engineers had and asked to be moved to the engineering pool instead of continuing to be a computer.

In 1958, when the NACA became NASA, segregated facilities, including the West Computing office, were abolished.

=== Legacy ===
The West Area Computers are described in Hidden Figures, a nonfiction book by Margot Lee Shetterly published in 2016 by William Morrow and Company. A 2016 biographical drama film, Hidden Figures, is based on the book.

On November 8, 2019, the Congressional Gold Medal was awarded "In recognition of all the women who served as computers, mathematicians, and engineers at the National Advisory Committee for Aeronautics and the National Aeronautics and Space Administration (NASA) between the 1930s and the 1970s."

== Notable members ==
- Dorothy Vaughan, in charge since 1949 of supervising the West Computers was the first African American female manager at NASA. Vaughan worked at Langley from 1943 through her retirement in 1971. She later became a FORTRAN programmer, a computer programming language that suited to numeric computation and scientific computing.
- Mary Jackson was involved in fluid dynamics (air streams) and flight tests. Her job was to get relevant data from experiments and conduct tests.
- Katherine Johnson, who in 2015 was named a Presidential Medal of Freedom recipient, joined the West Area Computing group in 1953. She was subsequently reassigned to Langley's Flight Research Division, where she performed notable work including providing the trajectory analysis for astronaut John Glenn's MA-6 Project Mercury orbital spaceflight. Katherine started her career working with information from flight tests, but later on a portion of her math work and research were used in lectures called Notes on Space Technology and taught to many students. These talks were given by engineers that later shaped the Space Task Group, that helped with space travel. The work of all three women (Vaughan, Johnson, and Jackson) is featured in the 2016 film Hidden Figures.
- Kathaleen Land, the Sunday school teacher of Hidden Figures author Margot Lee Shetterly, who had retired from NASA. Land was one of the first people Shetterly interviewed when she began researching for the Hidden Figures book, and Land provided several of the names of the human computers who were featured in the book and film. She is described as "the inspiration behind, catalyst for, and gateway to Hidden Figures".

== See also ==
- Melba Roy Mouton
