= Vaughan (crater) =

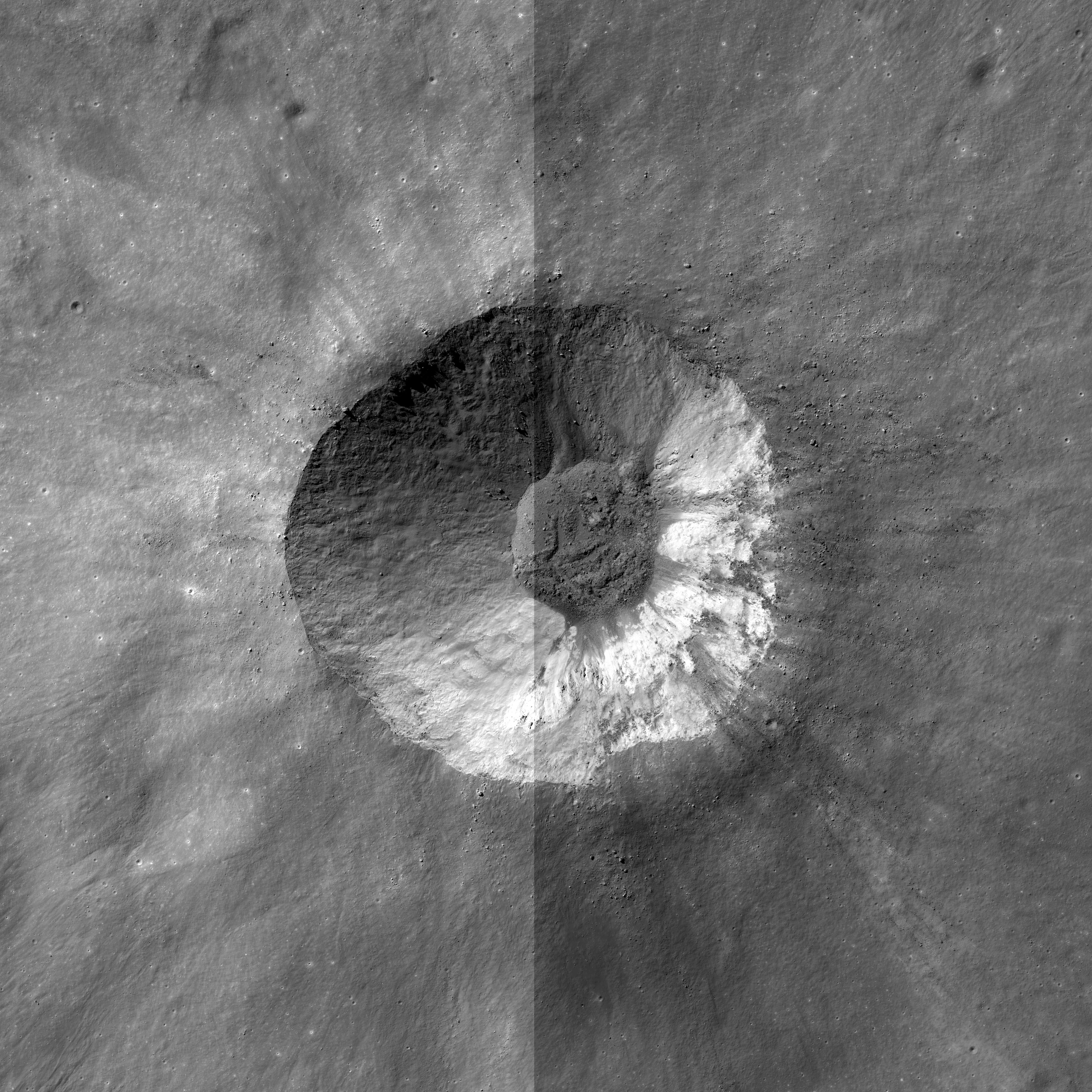
- LRO mosaic
- Coordinates: 41.41°S 171.85°W
- Diameter: 3 km
- Depth: Unknown
- Eponym: Dorothy Vaughan

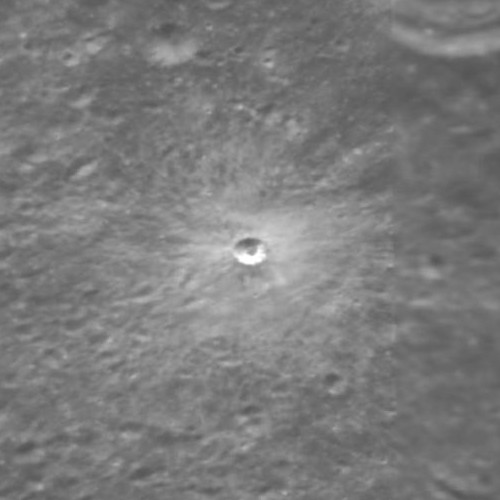
Clementine mosaic showing the ray system

Vaughan is a lunar impact crater that is located on the southern hemisphere on the far side of the Moon. It lies west of the crater Maksutov and north of Nishina. The crater has a bright system of rays and is thus young (Copernican age).

The crater's name was approved by the IAU on 16 October 2019. It is named after the American mathematician Dorothy Vaughan (1910-2008).
