= Quincy K. Brown =

American academic in the field of computer science

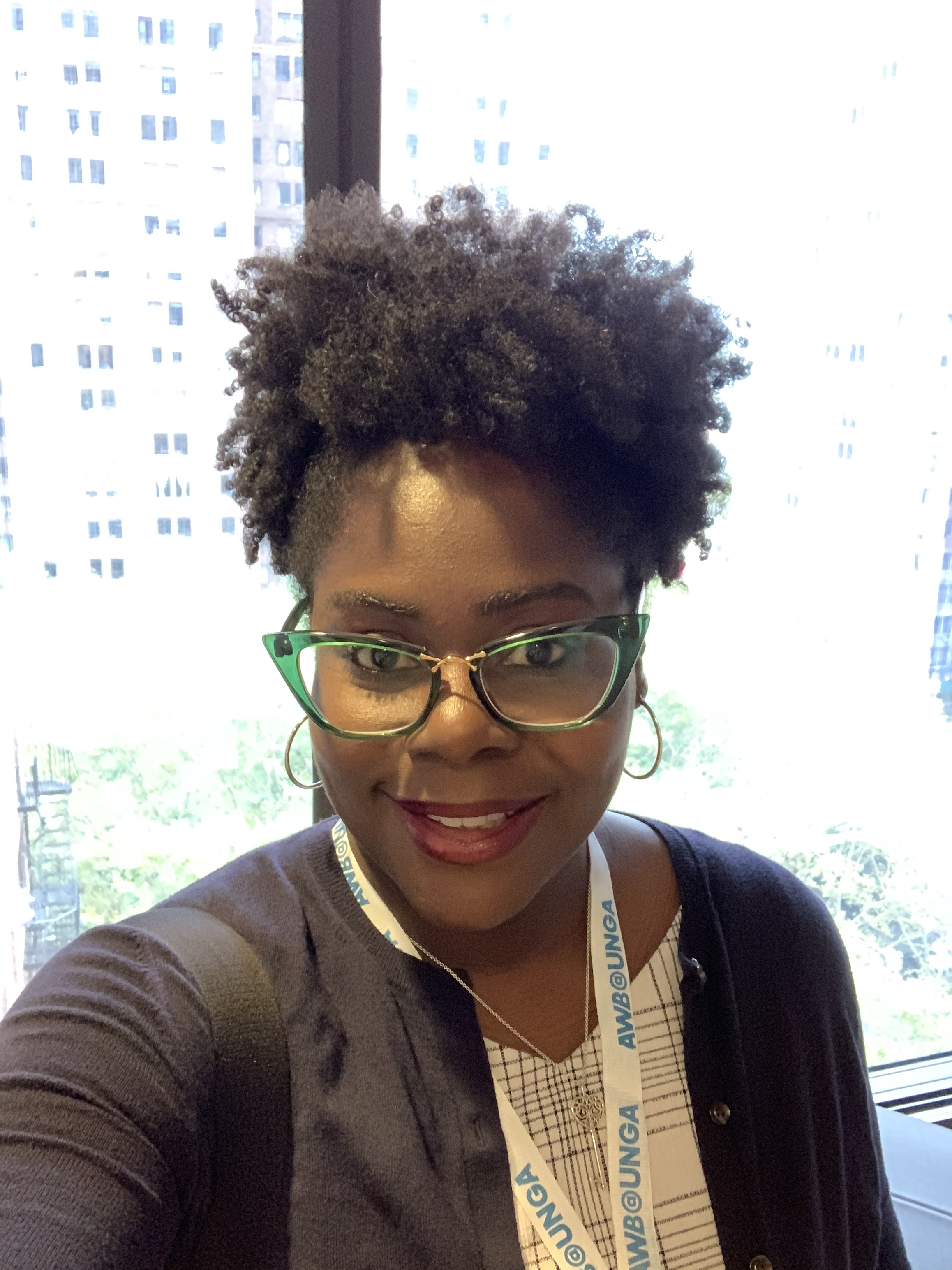
- Education: The Bronx High School of Science; North Carolina Agricultural & Technical State University; Drexel University
- Scientific career
- Fields: Mobile Technologies; Human Computer Interaction; Intelligent Tutoring Systems; Mobile Learning; Educational Game Design
- Workplaces: AnitaB.org; American Association for the Advancement of Science (AAAS); White House Office of Science and Technology Policy; National Science Foundation; Bowie State University
- Thesis: Mobile Intelligent Tutoring Systems: Moving Intelligent Tutoring Systems Off The Desktop

Quincy K. Brown is an American computer scientist and former Senior Policy Advisor in the White House Office of Science and Technology Policy. She is a published academic and co-founder of blackcomputeHER.org, NationOfMakers.org and Black In Computing. Brown is also a Senior Fellow at the Federation of American Scientists.

== Early life and education ==
Brown graduated from Bronx High School of Science and received a bachelor's degree in electrical engineering from North Carolina Agricultural & Technical State University in 1995. She earned a master of science degree (2007) and doctor of philosophy degree in computer science (2009) from Drexel University.

Brown's research focused on mobile Human Computer Interaction, Computer Science education, Intelligent Tutoring Systems, and Broadening Participation in Computing. Her work studied how children used touch and gesture on mobile devices for learning, how first responders used mobile devices in emergency situations, and inquiry behaviors for mobile devices.

== Career and research ==
Brown was an assistant professor at Bowie State University from 2010 to 2016. She left academia to pursue careers in the government and non-profit organizations after earning tenure.

Brown founded Girl Who Will, a summer program for middle and high school girls, in 2011.

Brown served as senior policy advisor for the White House Office of Science and Technology Policy in 2016 and program director for STEM Education Research at the American Association for the Advancement of Science (AAAS) from 2016 to 2019. In these roles, she worked on computer science education and broadening participation in STEM. Brown was one of 149 African Americans who served in the Obama administration to sign the June 26, 2019 Washington Post op-ed titled We are African Americans, we are patriots, and we refuse to sit idly by.

In 2020, Brown launched the organization blackcomputeHER.org with Jamika D. Burge and Jakita Thomas. The organization's mission is to support workforce development, computing education and technology education for Black women and girls through research, programs, and events. In the same year, Brown worked with colleagues to form Black In Computing, a nonprofit organization that supports its members in their pursuit to affect change in the computing community. She is also the co-founder of NationOfMakers.org, a non-profit organization to encourage an inclusive and diverse community of makers and Games+MobilePlay, Learn, Live Lab.

Brown is currently Director of Engagement and Research at AnitaB.org.

== Awards and Fellowships ==
In 2009, Brown received the National Science Foundation's Computing Community Consortium CI Fellows Postdoctoral Research Fellowship and GK-12 Fellow award. She was also a NSF Bridges to the Doctorate Fellow.

== Selected publications ==
- Brown, Q., R. G. Tull, L. Medina, M. Beadle-Holder, and Y. Medina. "Factoring Family Considerations into Female Faculty Choices for International Engagement in Engineering, IT, and Computer Science." In ASEE Annual Conference & Exposition, Seattle, Washington, vol. 10, p. 24093. 2015.
- Brown, Quincy, and Lisa Anthony. "Toward comparing the touchscreen interaction patterns of kids and adults." In SIGCHI EIST Workshop 2012. 2012.
- Brown, Quincy, and Jamika D. Burge. "MOTIVATE: Bringing out the fun with 3-D printing and e-textiles for middle-and high-school girls." In 2014 ASEE Annual Conference & Exposition, pp. 24–915. 2014.
- Brown, Quincy, Lisa Anthony, Jaye Nias, Berthel Tate, Robin Brewer, and Germaine Irwin. "Towards Designing Adaptive Touch-Based Interfaces." In Proceedings of the ACM SIGCHI 2013 Third Mobile Accessibility Workshop. 2013.
- Brewer, Robin, Lisa Anthony, Quincy Brown, Germaine Irwin, Jaye Nias, and Berthel Tate. "Using gamification to motivate children to complete empirical studies in lab environments." In Proceedings of the 12th international conference on interaction design and children, pp. 388–391. 2013.
- Anthony, Lisa, Quincy Brown, Berthel Tate, Jaye Nias, Robin Brewer, and Germaine Irwin. "Designing smarter touch-based interfaces for educational contexts." Personal and Ubiquitous Computing 18, no. 6 (2014): 1471-1483.
- Anthony, Lisa, Quincy Brown, Jaye Nias, Berthel Tate, and Shreya Mohan. "Interaction and recognition challenges in interpreting children's touch and gesture input on mobile devices." In Proceedings of the 2012 ACM international conference on Interactive tabletops and surfaces, pp. 225–234. 2012.
