= Marsha Rhea Williams =

African American educator and researcher

- Born: August 4, 1948 (age 78); Memphis, Tennessee, U.S.
- Education: Beloit College; University of Michigan; Vanderbilt University
- Known for: Being the first African American woman to earn a Ph.D. in computer science
- Scientific career
- Workplaces: University of Mississippi; Memphis State University; Fisk University; IBM; Tennessee State University
- Thesis: The Design of the Computer Assisted Query Language (CAQL) System (1982)

Marsha Rhea Williams (born 1948) is an American educator and researcher, she is known for being the first African American woman to earn a Ph.D. in computer science. She held many academic positions and was most recently a tenured professor at Tennessee State University. Additionally, she advocates for greater minority representation in STEM fields.

== Early life and education ==
Williams was born on August 4, 1948, in Memphis, Tennessee, to parents James Edward Williams and Velma Lee Williams. In 1969, she earned her B.S. in physics from Beloit College. Afterwards, in 1971, she earned her M.S. in physics from the University of Michigan.

After spending time in instructing positions, Williams arrived at Vanderbilt University to begin her doctoral studies. In 1976, she earned her M.S. in systems and information science at Vanderbilt. Then, in 1982, she earned her Ph.D. in computer science. In accomplishing this, she became the first African American woman to earn a Ph.D. in computer science. For her Ph.D., she wrote her dissertation, “The Design of the Computer Assisted Query Language (CAQL) System,” which “examined the emerging field of user experience in querying large databases.”

== Career ==
Williams has held faculty positions at the University of Mississippi, Memphis State University, and Fisk University. She has also worked for IBM and was an NSF fellow. She most recently was a tenured professor of computer science at Tennessee State University. Williams was among the first African American professors to hold teaching positions in engineering and computer science at both the University of Mississippi and Tennessee State University. She has published several academic articles and presented at conferences.

Williams is a member of several professional organizations, including the Association for Computing Machinery, the Association of Information Technology Professionals, and the Tennessee Academy of Science. She served on the board of the AITP's Data Processing Management Association. In addition to her research and education roles, Williams advocates for diversity in computer science and engineering. Williams advised the National Society of Black Engineering Students and founded the Association for Excellence in Computer Science, Math, and Physics. She has also directed Tennessee State's Project MISET (Minorities in Science, Engineering, and Technology). Her biography appears in several Who's Who publications. In addition, popular publications list her alongside other notable computer scientists such as Dorothy Vaughan and Melba Roy Mouton.

== Selected publications ==
- Williams, Marsha R. “The design of the computer assisted query language (caql) system.” Ph.D. Dissertation. 1982. Vanderbilt University, US.
- Williams, Marsha R. “Engineering Management and Technical Solutions to Human Problems: A Computer-Related Example.” Engineering Management International, vol. 1, no. 3, 1982, pp. 227–237., doi:10.1016/0167-5419(82)90022-9.
- Williams, Marsha R. “Information Technology Resources for Education in Developing Countries.” Capacity Building for IT in Education in Developing Countries, 1998, pp. 251–260., doi:10.1007/978-0-387-35195-7_27.
