= Alicia Nicki Washington =

Computer scientist, author

- Education: Johnson C. Smith University (BS); North Carolina State University (MS, PhD)
- Scientific career
- Fields: Computer Science
- Workplaces: Duke University
- Doctoral advisor: Harry Perros

Alicia Nicki Washington is an American computer scientist, author, and professor at Duke University. She is the author of the book Unapologetically Dope. She was the first Black woman to earn a Doctor of Philosophy in Computer Science from North Carolina State University in 2005.

== Early life and education ==
Washington learned how to code from her mother, who was a programmer at IBM, while growing up in Durham, North Carolina. BASIC and PASCAL are programming languages that Washington grew familiar with at this time.

Growing up Washington experienced the most diversity within her girl scout troop; and Washington said that it encouraged community between everyone outside of school, despite her growing up in a mostly black community and others in white communities.

Washington said that at 12, she was told by her teacher that she "gave blacks a bad rep." She has also highlighted racist student reviews of her collegiate teaching referring to her as "rude" or "disrespectful".

Washington attended undergraduate school at Johnson C. Smith University, obtaining a Bachelor of Science in mathematics in 2000. She earned her Master of Science in 2002 and her Doctor of Philosophy (PhD) in 2005 in Computer Science (CS) from North Carolina State University (NC State). Of the students who have graduated from this university, Washington was also the first Black woman to receive a computer science Ph.D.

== Career ==
=== 2006-2020 ===
In 2006, Washington became an assistant professor of CS at Howard University, where she was the first Black woman CS faculty. At Howard, Washington helped develop Google's "Google In Residence" program. Washington joined Winthrop University in 2015 as an associate professor of CS.

=== Duke University (2020-present) ===
Washington joined Duke University's faculty as a professor of CS in June 2020.

Washington founded the course "Race, Gender, Class, and Computing" during her first year of being a professor at Duke University in 2020.

Also in 2020, Washington was included in an article, Minding the Gaps, by Communications of the ACM, a well-known computer science organization. In this, she was quoted about her experiences joining the field of computer science, demonstrating her media presence.

Washington, along with Dr. Shaundra Daily and PhD candidate Cecilé Sadler, created the Cultural Competence in Computing (3C) Fellows Program.

In 2021, Washington and Daily were awarded a $10 million grant from the National Science Foundation to establish Duke University's Alliance for Identity-Inclusive Computing Education (AIICE).

In 2023, Washington was named a co-recipient of the ACM Karl V. Karlstrom Oustanding Educator Award, recognizing her work in developing identity-inclusive computing education and establishing the Cultural Competence in Computing (3C) Fellows program.

In 2025, Washington was elected an ACM Distinguished Member.

As of 2026, Washington is a professor of the Practice of African & African American Studies at the Trinity College of Arts & Sciences Department.

Washington has also contributed to efforts to increase diversity in technology fields, particularly through cybersecurity education and outreach programs.

Washington is also the leader of the Alliance for Interdisciplinary Innovation in Computing Education or (AAiiCE) that targets primary and secondary school students to get more involved in computer science.

== Selected publications ==
- Martin, Juil C.; Burge III, Legand L.; Gill, Joseph I.; Washington, Alicia N.; Alfred, Marcus (2010-01-01). "Modelling the spread of mobile malware". International Journal of Computer Aided Engineering and Technology. 2 (1): 3–14. doi:10.1504/IJCAET.2010.029592. ISSN 1757-2657.
- Washington, A. Nicki; Burge, Legand; Mejias, Marlon; Jean-Pierre, Ketly; Knox, Qi'Anne (2015-02-24). "Improving Undergraduate Student Performance in Computer Science at Historically Black Colleges and Universities (HBCUs) through Industry Partnerships". Proceedings of the 46th ACM Technical Symposium on Computer Science Education. SIGCSE '15. New York, NY, USA: Association for Computing Machinery. pp. 203–206. doi:10.1145/2676723.2677277. ISBN 978-1-4503-2966-8. S2CID 29968292.
- Washington, Alicia (2020-02-26). "When Twice as Good Isn't Enough: The Case for Cultural Competence in Computing": 213–219. doi:10.1145/3328778.3366792. S2CID 211519273.
- Washington, Alicia Nicki; Perros, Harry (2004-06-21). "Call blocking probabilities in a traffic-groomed tandem optical network". Computer Networks. In Memory of Olga Casals. 45 (3): 281–294. doi:10.1016/j.comnet.2004.03.008. ISSN 1389-1286.
- Washington, Nicki (20 October 2017). "Biddle, Brayboy and Bojangles: We Love Thee, Smith". The Root.
- Washington, A. Nicki (2018). Unapologetically dope : lessons for Black women and girls on surviving and thriving in the tech field. Charlotte, North Carolina. ISBN 978-0-9847467-9-8. OCLC 1080937560.
- Washington, Alicia Nicki, Cecilé Sadler, and Shaundra Daily. “Identity-Inclusive Computing: Paving the Path Forward.” In Proceedings of the 56th ACM Technical Symposium on Computer Science Education V. 2, 1730–1730. ACM, 2025. https://doi.org/10.1145/3641555.3705086.

== See also ==
- Timnit Gebru
- Khalia Braswell
- Deborah Raji
- Joy Buolamwini
