= Miriam D. Mann =

Human Computer, NACA/NASA

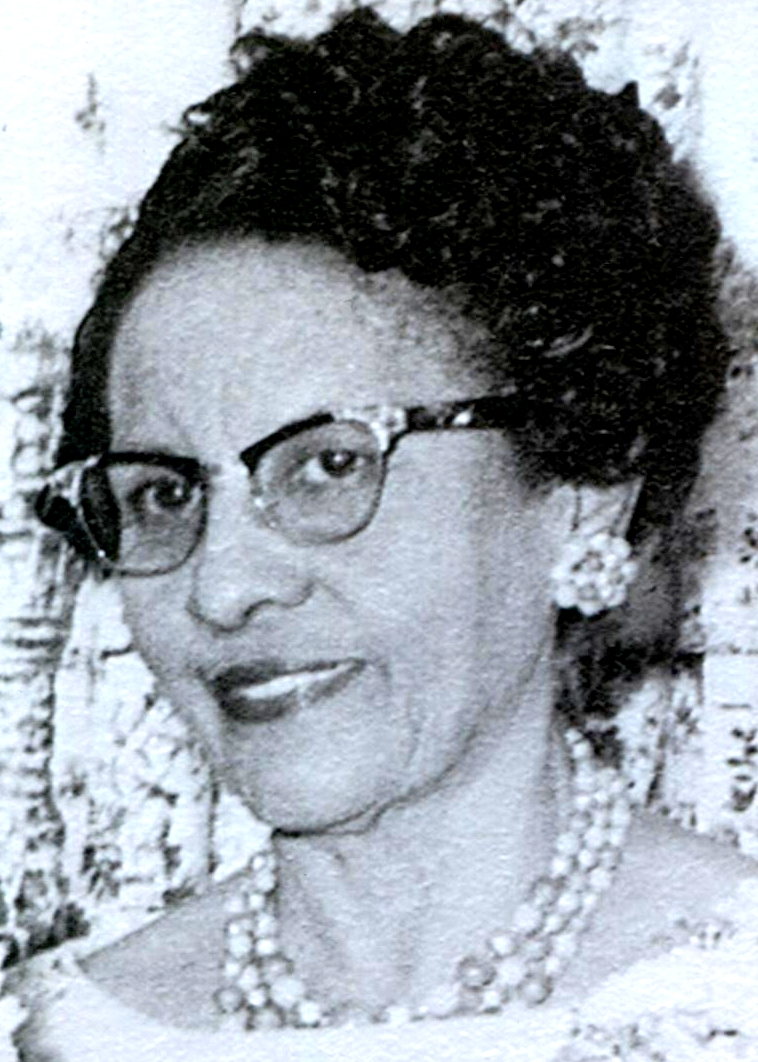
- Born: 1907; Covington, Georgia
- Died: 1967 (aged 59–60)
- Education: Talladega College

Miriam Daniel Mann (1907–1967) was one of the first Black female computers for the National Advisory Committee for Aeronautics (NACA).

== Biography ==
Mann was born in 1907, in Covington, Georgia. She attended Talladega College. She was married to Bill Mann, with whom she had three children. In 1943, in the wake of labor shortages caused by World War II, Mann responded to a recruitment drive for Black female mathematicians by the National Advisory Committee for Aeronautics (NACA). She subsequently attended a 10-week training course at Hampton Institute and was accepted for a position as a "human computer". At the time she was hired the state of Virginia was segregated, as was the NACA campus at Langley, Virginia. Mann repeatedly removed the "COLORED COMPUTERS" sign segregating the cafeteria. The sign was replaced each time until Mann removed it a final time and it was never replaced.

Mann worked for NACA (which became NASA in 1958) until her retirement in 1966. She died in 1967.

In 2017 Mann's granddaughter Duchess Harris co-authored a book with Sue Bradford Edwards entitled Hidden Human Computers: The Black Women of NASA. In 2018 the Virginia Capitol Foundation announced that Mann's name would be on the Virginia Women's Monument's glass Wall of Honor.

== See also ==
- West Area Computers
- African-American women in computer science
