= Donna Auguste =

African-American businesswoman, entrepreneur, philanthropist and engineer

- Born: 1958 (age 67–68); Texas
- Education: University of California, Berkeley, Carnegie Mellon University
- Occupations: Engineer, entrepreneur

Donna Auguste (born 1958) is an African-American businesswoman, entrepreneur, and philanthropist. She was the co-founder, along with colleague John Meier, and chief executive officer (CEO) of Freshwater Software from 1996 to 2000. Prior to founding Freshwater Software, Auguste was a senior engineering manager at Apple Computer who helped to coordinate the development of the Newton personal digital assistant (PDA). Additionally, she was the senior director for US West Advanced Technologies, whereabouts she met John Meier, and began seriously thinking about the creation of Freshwater Software.

In 2000, she sold Freshwater Software to Mercury Interactive Corp. for $147 million. In the same year, she was recognized as one of the "25 Women Who Are Making It Big in Small Business" by Fortune Magazine. She also won the 2001 Golden Torch Award for Outstanding Woman in Technology. After returning to academia for a Ph.D. with the University of Colorado Boulder, Auguste was awarded the "eminent engineer" designation from the nation's oldest engineering honor society, Tau Beta Pi.

== Early life and education ==
Donna Auguste was born in Texas but relocated to Louisiana and then to California where she attended college. She and her four sisters were raised by their mother. Since an early age, Auguste loved to tinker with household appliances. She would frequently take apart doorbells and disassemble other electrical appliances to understand the mechanics behind how they work. After graduating from high school, she enrolled in the electrical engineering and computer science (EECS) program at the University of California, Berkeley where she overcame many obstacles to earn her undergraduate Bachelor of Science degree in Electrical Engineering and Computer Science. Attending a program with a high concentration of male peers, Auguste was frequently ostracized and devalued by her colleagues.

Auguste went on to become the first African-American woman to attend the PhD program at Carnegie-Mellon University.

== Career ==
While conducting research in applied science and artificial intelligence at Carnegie-Mellon University, Auguste interned at Xerox Corporation's Palo Alto Research Center and met the future founders of IntelliCorp. Auguste was hired by IntelliCorp as a software engineer in 1986 to work on technology products that incorporated artificial intelligence. After spending four years at IntelliCorp, Auguste took a break from work for two months to bike through Japan's countryside. Upon her return, Auguste was hired by Apple Computer in 1990 to serve as lead software engineering manager for the Newton PDA development project. While at Apple Computer, Auguste was well-liked and won praises for her managerial skills as well as technical contributions (she held various patents for her work on the Newton PDA).

In 1996, Auguste relocated to Boulder, Colorado and joined U.S. West Advanced Technologies as senior director of multimedia systems engineering and development. While working on interactive television applications for the company's fiber-optic broadband network, Auguste foresaw the potential of the internet and later launched her own company: Freshwater Software Inc., a provider of software solutions for maintaining and monitoring business-critical web applications. Freshwater Software grew rapidly from a tiny start-up into a nationally recognized multimillion-dollar software provider which boasted Fortune 500 clients such as Alta Vista, IBM, Microsoft, Go.com, and Merrill Lynch. Freshwater Software was later purchased by Mercury Interactive Corp. of California for $147 million in 2001.

== Personal life ==
Upon retiring after the sale of Freshwater Software, Auguste founded the Leave a Little Room Foundation, LLC, a philanthropic organization that helps provide housing, electricity, and vaccinations to poor and underprivileged communities around the world.

In 2009, Auguste was awarded $750,000 from Santa Clara County as a settlement for winning a high-profile lawsuit stemming from questionable tactics used by the prosecutor from the district attorney's office in a criminal case where Auguste's Colorado home was searched in connection with her nephew Damon Auguste's rape conviction which was later overturned. She is a Catholic and a member of Cure d'Ars Parish in Denver.
