= Brandeis Marshall =

American data scientist

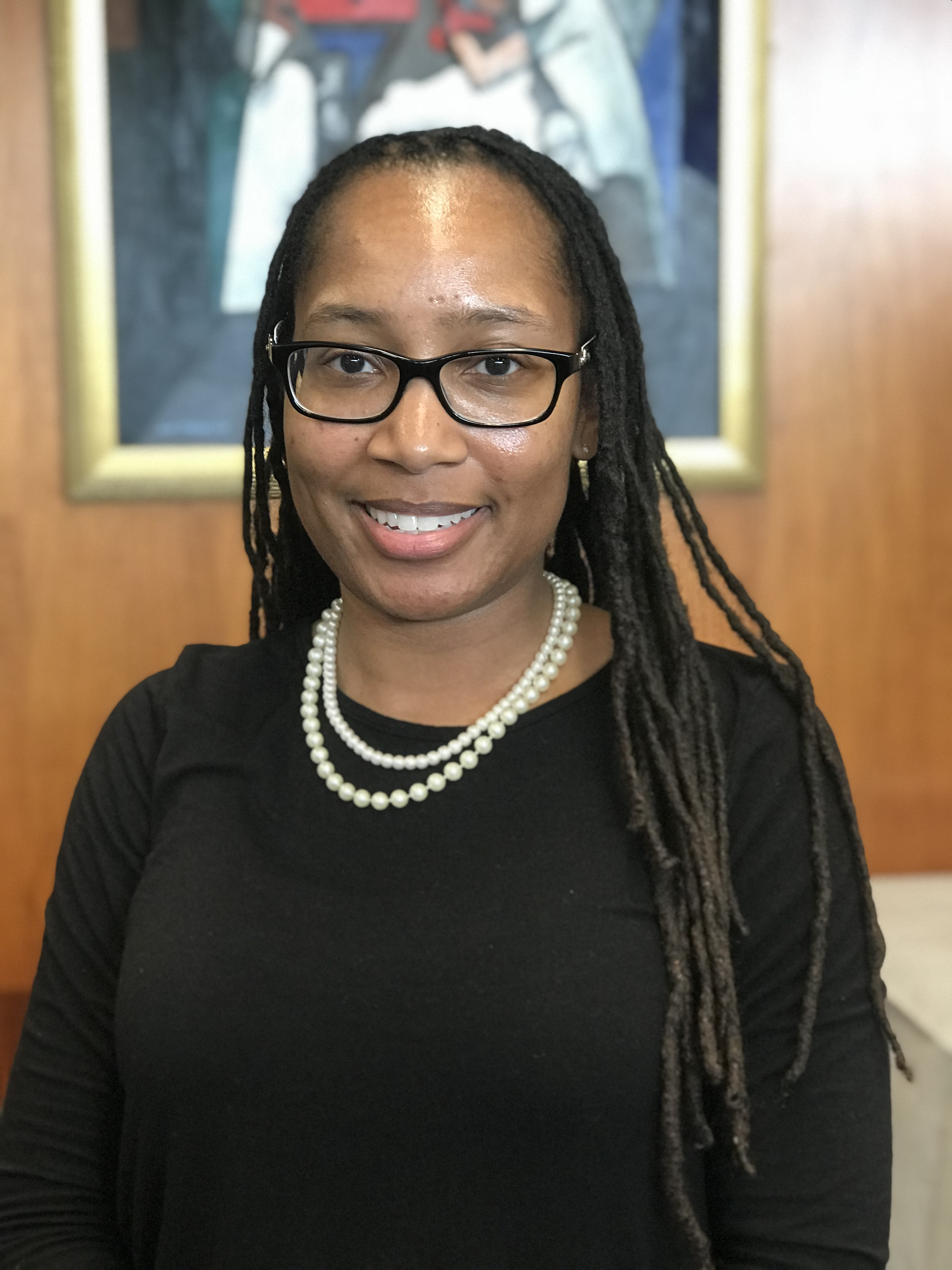
- Education: University of Rochester; Rensselaer Polytechnic Institute
- Known for: Broadening participation in data science
- Scientific career
- Fields: Data science; Computer science; Education
- Workplaces: Purdue University; Spelman College
- Website: brandeismarshall.com

Brandeis Marshall is an American data scientist, CEO of DataedX Group, a data ethics and strategy management agency. She's formerly a Full Professor of Computer Science at Spelman College (2019-2023), where she served as Chair of the Department of Computer and Information Sciences from 2016 to 2018 as an Associate Professor of Computer Science. Starting in September 2019, Marshall is a faculty associate at Berkman Klein Center for Internet & Society at Harvard University. Additionally, in 2021-2022, she was a Practitioner Fellow at the Stanford Program on AI and Civil Society (PACS). Marshall has also worked to broaden participation in the field of data science to increase representation of underrepresented minorities, including her effort 'Black Women in Data'. Marshall's 2022 book, Data Conscience: Algorithmic Siege on Our Humanity, explores the role of data in shaping social equality and examines how bias in software, algorithms, and data structures can reinforce discrimination. The book also calls for greater accountability and ethical considerations in data science, advocating for more inclusive and responsible technological practices.

== Education ==
Marshall received her bachelor's degree in Science in computer science with a minor in mathematics from the University of Rochester in 2000. She then received her master's degree and Ph.D. from Rensselaer Polytechnic Institute in Computer Science in 2007.

== Research and career ==
In 2008, Marshall became an assistant professor of computer and information technology in data management at Purdue University's College of Technology. She joined the faculty at Spelman College in 2014 as an associate professor of Computer Science in the Division of Natural Sciences and Mathematics and became Chair of the Computer and Information Sciences department in 2016. At Spelman, she is the Director of the Data Analytics and Exploration (da+e) Laboratory, which centers on more effectively characterizing complex networks of data to generate useful knowledge. Her research focuses on business intelligence and data analytics, social media, and cybersecurity.

=== #BlackTwitter Project ===
One of Marshall's research projects centers on the use of social media, and Twitter in particular, for advancing social movements across the black community through the use of the hashtag #BlackTwitter. Her team works with Twitter's application programming interface (API) to gather, analyze, and visualize trends in Twitter data to answer questions like who makes up Black Twitter, who are the influencers within the community, and what issues and topics are they responding to as a community. The project also took the form of a course for Spelman College's Interdisciplinary Big Questions Colloquia, exposing students to principles of data science through by collecting, storing, and analyzing social media data related to the #BlackGirlMagic hashtag. Analysis of the efficacy of the course itself was presented at the Institute of Electrical and Electronics Engineers' Frontiers in Education Conference as a way to teach data science concepts in a culturally relevant framework, since the course also wove in themes of black girlhood alongside computational approaches to data analysis.

=== Business Intelligence ===
Marshall has also contributed research to business intelligence, working to organize, integrate, represent, and analyze a diverse array of data to enable businesses to glean more knowledge and keep pace with the increasing rate of data generation. She has worked on a broad range of problems—from recommending more refined algorithms for music recommendations to designing cost-effective cybersecurity security measures to harnessing the power of eye tracking to better design products for consumers.

== Broadening participation in data science ==
In addition to her research interests, Marshall is involved in a number of efforts to increase representation of underrepresented groups in data science and increase data readiness across the workforce. She is the Principal Investigator (PI) of the Data Science eXtension (DSX) program, which is funded by a National Science Foundation grant. The program is an effort to train faculty at Spelman College and Morehouse College—both historically black colleges and universities (HBCUs) in Atlanta—on how they can infuse data science and analytics into their curricula. DSX seeks to highlight how data science connects to multiple disciplines, while increasing awareness of opportunities in data science to a student body that is currently underrepresented in the field. The project was informed by a 2016 NSF-funded workshop on "Planning a Dual Institution Research Center in Socially Relevant Computing."

Prior to the launch of DSX, Marshall was involved in similar programs geared at broadening participation of underrepresented groups. She was the co-PI of the Broadening Participation in Data Mining Workshop, which was first run in conjunction with the 2012 Society for Industrial and Applied Mathematics International Conference on Data Mining. She also served as the PI for the Computer Science for All Workshop in Atlanta, which was part of a larger national effort orchestrated by the Office of Science and Technology Policy—and led by the NSF and United States Department of Education—under President Barack Obama to build capacity in computer science across the country.

Marshall has also lent her expertise to furthering data science training at the undergraduate level, serving on the National Academy of Sciences' 2018 Roundtable on Data Science Postsecondary Education.
