= Shaundra Daily =

American professor and author (born 1979)

Shaundra B. Daily
- Born: May 29, 1979 (age 47); Nashville, Tennessee, U.S.
- Education: Florida State University, Florida Agricultural and Mechanical University, Massachusetts Institute of Technology
- Scientific career
- Fields: Human-Centered Computing, Affective Computing
- Workplaces: Duke University, University of Florida, Clemson University
- Doctoral advisor: Rosalind Picard

Shaundra Bryant Daily (born May 29, 1979) is an American professor and author known for her work in the field of human-centered computing and broadening participation in STEM. She is a professor in the Department of Electrical and Computer Engineering and Computer Science at Duke University.

== Early life and education ==
Growing up, Daily was interested in math and science and loved to dance and do gymnastics. Daily received her B.S. in Engineering from Florida State University in 2001, her M.S. from Florida Agricultural and Mechanical University in 2003, and her S.M. (2005) and Ph.D. (2010) from the Massachusetts Institute of Technology Media Lab. At the Media Lab, she worked with the Affective Computing and Future of Learning Groups.

== Career ==
After graduating from the Media Lab, Daily joined Clemson University's School of Computing in the Human-Centered Computing Division as an assistant professor. There she was promoted to associate professor and served as co-chair of the division.

In 2012, Daily was involved in a controversial project to measure galvanic skin response in classrooms using bracelets from startup Affectiva. The project was funded by the Bill and Melinda Gates Foundation and was criticized by Diane Ravitch of New York University.

Daily's work at Clemson focused on the use of dance to teach programming. Students used block programming to choreograph dances in a virtual environment. The aim of the research was to help bridge the gender gap in computer science and engineering.

In 2015, she joined the Department of Computing and Information Sciences at the University of Florida as an associate professor, before moving to Duke University where she serves as an associate professor in the Department of Electrical and Computer Engineering. As Faculty Director of Duke Technology Scholars Program, QuadEx lead Faculty Fellow, and faculty representative of the executive committee for the Pratt School of Engineering Diversity, Inclusion, Equity and Community Committee, Daily continues working for equity in education.

Daily's accomplishments have been documented in articles, web series and podcasts. She was featured in news sources for her work fusing dance and a virtual environment to teach computer programming as well as The Washington Post for her work exploring privacy and trust issues of affective computing in the classroom. Daily was featured alongside Neil deGrasse Tyson and Mayim Bialik on the PBS web series The Secret Life Of Scientists And Engineers.

== Honors and awards ==
- 2023 Association for Computing Machinery Karl V. Karlstrom Outstanding Educator Award (with A. Nicki Washington)
- 2022 Black STEM Leader, Governor Roy Cooper of North Carolina
- 2020 Undergraduate Mentor of the Year, Duke University
- 2015 Technology, Instruction, Cognition and Learning Early Career Research Award given by the American Education Research Association.
- 2015 Delta Alpha Pi, Extraordinary Educator Award for outstanding work which impacts students with disabilities.
- 2013 BDPA Most Promising Technologist Epsilon Award
- 2013 Diverse Issues and Higher Education, Emerging Scholar
