= Deborah Washington Brown =

American computer scientist (1952–2020)

- Born: Deborah Blanche Washington; June 3, 1952; Washington, D.C.
- Died: June 5, 2020 (aged 68); Atlanta, Georgia
- Education: Lowell Technological Institute, Harvard University
- Known for: Speech recognition research; Classical piano
- Spouse: Ruel Brown
- Children: 2
- Awards: first Black computer scientist to earn a Ph.D. in applied mathematics at Harvard
- Scientific career
- Fields: Computer science
- Thesis: The solution of difference equations describing array manipulation in program loops

Deborah Washington Brown (June 3, 1952 – June 5, 2020) was an American computer scientist who worked at AT&T Bell Labs in speech recognition research. She became the first black woman to earn a doctorate in computer science (then a part of their applied math program) at Harvard University in 1981, and was one of the first black female computer scientists to graduate from a US doctoral program.

== Early life and education ==
Born Deborah Blanche Washington on June 3, 1952, in Washington, D.C., Brown was the youngest of four children (with a twin brother, Melvin Charles Washington) of Edwin and Lola Washington. Brown's mother was a hairdresser and her father was a taxi cab driver. She attended high school at the National Cathedral School from 1966 to 1970. She was admitted to the New England Conservatory of Music in 1970 to pursue her dream of becoming a classical pianist, but left in 1971 for Lowell Technological Institute (now part of University of Massachusetts Lowell) after being dissuaded about her prospects. She received a bachelor's degree with honors in mathematics at Lowell in 1975.

Washington received a master's (1977) and a PhD (1981) in applied mathematics from the Harvard John A. Paulson School of Engineering and Applied Sciences at Harvard University, advised first by Harry R. Lewis and then by Tom Cheatham. Her thesis was titled "The solution of difference equations describing array manipulation in program loops". She was elected Commencement marshal at her graduation.

Brown also taught math for a time at several colleges in the state of Georgia.

== Computer science career ==
Brown's first job was at Norden Systems, developing software for missile defense technology. In the late 1980s, she joined AT&T Bell Labs as a Member of Technical Staff and later Principal Member of Technical Staff. Her speech technology career continued at Verizon Wireless and Speech-Soft Solutions.

Brown worked at the forefront of many applications of speech recognition during her career, and was named as an inventor on 11 patents. These include data collection methods using automatic speech recognition (ASR) instead of human agents, methods for correcting ASR errors in user ID recognition (numbers or names) over the phone using confusion matrices, innovations in grammar generation and pruning for ASR, methods for identifying prompt-specific caller responses, multiple methods to identify errors in recognition of user account numbers due to ASR issues using confusion matrices of possible answers, a natural language call router, and a system to bridge text chat interaction with a voice-enabled interactive voice response system.

== Personal life ==
Brown was an accomplished classical pianist, having earned a level 10 certification from The Royal Conservatory of Music. Throughout her career in computer science, Brown continued to study and teach piano, playing at Carnegie Hall and excelling in competitions. When asked by her daughter about what she would do if she knew she couldn't fail, Brown stated how she would "tour the world playing Rachmaninoff."

Brown married Ruel “Rula” Brown on May 26, 1979; they met while she was at Harvard and he was a mechanical engineering student at the Wentworth Institute of Technology. They had two daughters. She died in Atlanta on June 5, 2020, due to pancreatic cancer.

== See also ==
- Women in computing
