= Elaine Denniston =

American lawyer

Elaine K. M. Denniston
- Born: 1939 (age 86–87); Roxbury, Boston
- Education: Radcliffe College; Boston University Law School
- Occupation: Lawyer
- Known for: Work on the Apollo program

Elaine Denniston is an American lawyer who supported the Apollo program as a keypunch operator. She supported the Guidance, Navigation, and Control (GNC) team working on the software to control both the Apollo command and service module.

== Early life and education ==
Denniston was born in Roxbury, Boston in 1939. She graduated from Girls’ Latin School, a college preparatory high school located in Boston, in 1957.

== Apollo program ==
In 1965, Denniston was hired by Kelly Services, an employment agency. She was assigned to MIT Instrumentation Lab (now Draper Laboratory), and was hired directly by the lab within a few months of starting. Denniston joined the GNC team developing the software to approach and land on the surface of the moon. Denniston worked as a keypunch operator, taking the developed source code and entering it onto the keypunch cards. According to Denniston:

I punched the cards that eventually were turned into the program for the guidance system for the Apollo project. Punching cards is punching cards whether you’re in an insurance company or working on the Apollo project. The programmers would give me 11-inch by 17-inch sheets of paper. They would write the program in blocks. My job was to keypunch it onto the cards. Remember, direct access to computers didn’t happen back then.

Denniston was known for catching errors made by the programmers, such as a missing symbol or closing parentheses. At the time, the punchcards would be processed overnight, and an error could waste the entire run.

Denniston left MIT after two years due to lack of opportunity for advancement. She cited training someone who eventually became her boss in the department. She was told that they needed someone to come in for support, no matter the time of day. She was the mother of two at the time, and felt this was the reason she was overlooked for advancement: "I think looking back that was the only time I felt being a woman was against me, so to speak".

== Later career ==
Following her departure from the MIT Instrumentation Lab, Denniston returned to school and graduated from Radcliffe College in 1973. She went on to attend Boston University Law School. She has spent her career in the public sector, working for the district attorney's office as well as the city of Boston.

In 1981, Denniston helped found the group Massachusetts Black Women Attorneys, a nonprofit bar association dedicated to helping Black women attorneys.

Denniston retired in 2012.
