= Ihudiya Finda Williams =

Computer scientist

Ihudiya Finda Williams is a computer scientist who specializes in human–computer interaction (HCI). Her research is at the intersection of identity, culture, and computing. Specifically, she examines digital technology use among populations with low resources due to systemic injustices, and explores tech-enabled solutions to either highlight injustices or find future alternatives (i.e., anti-racist design). Currently, Williams is an assistant professor at Virginia Tech's Department of Computer Science. She is best known for being the founder of the Race in HCI Collective. She is the lead Principal Investigator for the Reimagining Equity and Accessibility in Computing for Humanity (REACH) Lab. She is also a member of the Center for Human-Computer Interaction (CHCI), Michigan ICTD, Michigan Interactive and Social Computing (MISC), and the Center for Critical Race & Digital Studies.

== Education ==
Ihudiya Finda Williams attended the Rochester Institute of Technology, where she obtained a Bachelor of Science in Information Technology in 2010. Then, Williams attended Harvard University, where she obtained a Master of Education (M.Ed.) in Technology, Innovation, and Education. In 2023, she obtained her Ph.D. from the School of Information at the University of Michigan, where her dissertation research was supported by multiple fellowships (including the Microsoft Research Dissertation Fellowship, GEM Fellowship, Generation Google Scholarship (formerly known as Google's Women Techmakers Scholars), and the Rackham Graduate School Merit Fellowship). Williams was advised by Kentaro Toyama.

== Virginia Tech ==
Ihudiya Finda Williams is leading the Reimagining Equity and Accessibility in Computing for Humanity (REACH) Lab at Virginia Tech. The lab's research focuses on technology access, digital equity, and community-centered computing, particularly in underserved and rural communities.

1. Rural Computer Science Education: Williams and her team study disparities in computer science education in rural areas of the United States. Specifically, how limited access to trained computer science teachers affects students' preparedness for postsecondary computing programs.
2. Environmental Awareness and Rural Communities: Another strand of Williams' work examines how rural communities access and interpret information about environmental and climate-related changes.
3. Technology Use in the Black Church: Williams conducts research on how church leaders and congregants of the Black Church adopt and engage with digital technologies.

== Professional and community leadership ==
From September 2011 to February 2014, Ihudiya Finda Williams was a Peace Corps volunteer, ICT Local Government Capacity Builder. She served as an Information and Communication Technology Local Government Capacity Building Volunteer in the southern African country of Botswana. She contributed to building the District AIDS Coordinating Office and the Lethakeng Community in information and communications technologies, working closely with the Senior Ministry of Local Government IT officials. In 2021, she received the UMSI Award for Impact in Diversity, Equity & Inclusion in recognition of her leadership in DEI and racial justice initiatives at UMSI, particularly as the founder and leader of Black\@SI. Since 2024, she has been the chair of the Futuring SIGCHI Committee.

== Media appearances ==
In January 2026, Ihudiya Finda Williams was featured on 1A (radio program) to discuss the state of Black academia. In the podcast episode, the impact of federal and state policies on diversity, equity, and inclusion (DEI) programs in higher education was discussed. The episode examined actions taken by the Trump administration to restrict DEI initiatives in schools and universities, as well as subsequent state legislation affecting diversity offices, cultural centers, and academic programming.
