= Carlotta Berry =

American academic in the field of engineering

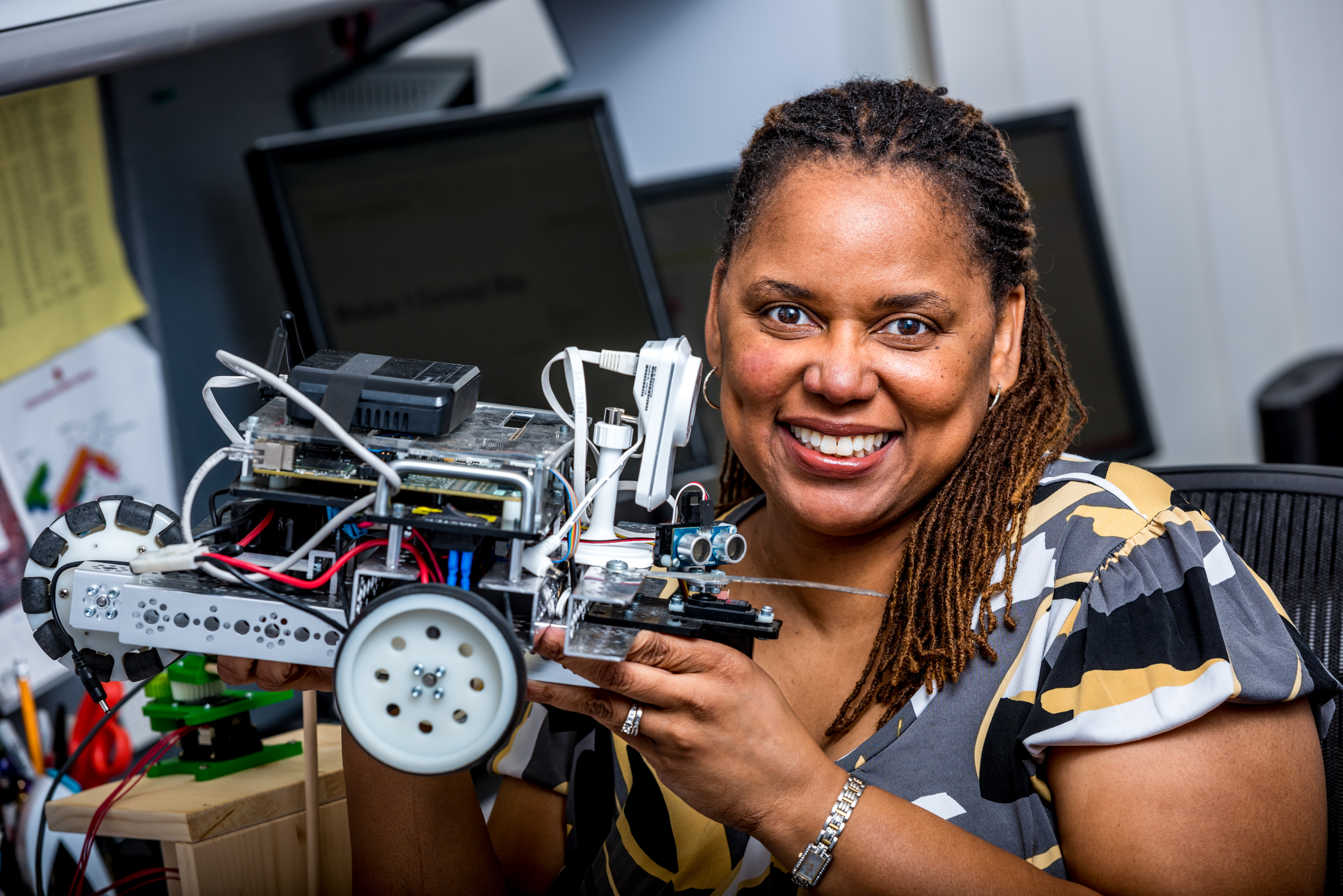
- Born: Nashville, Tennessee, U.S.
- Education: Spelman College (B.S.); Georgia Institute of Technology (B.S.); Wayne State University (M.S.); Vanderbilt University (Ph.D.)
- Scientific career
- Fields: Robotics; Education
- Workplaces: Rose-Hulman Institute of Technology; Tennessee State University

Carlotta Berry is an American academic in the field of engineering. She is a professor of electrical and computer engineering at Rose-Hulman Institute of Technology. She is co-director of the Rose Building Undergraduate Diversity (ROSE-BUD) program. She is a co-founder of Black In Engineering and a co-founder of Black In Robotics.

== Early life and education ==
Berry received bachelor's degrees in mathematics (1992) and electrical engineering (1993) through a dual degree program between Spelman College and Georgia Tech. At Georgia Tech she observed the scarcity of female and African-American students and faculty within the engineering program, which sparked her desire to become an engineering professor to encourage greater participation of underrepresented populations in the profession. After graduation, she worked in industry to repay her student loans while concurrently pursuing a masters degree at Wayne State University. She earned her masters in control systems from Wayne State University in 1996, and a year later left industry to pursue a doctoral degree at Vanderbilt University. Berry was part of the Vanderbilt University Intelligent Robotics Laboratory (IRL), and was advised by Kazuhiko Kawamura and Julie Adams. Her doctoral thesis was on human-robot interface development for a mobile robot, specifically the enhancement of the interface through graphical visualization of the robot's short-term memory.

== Career and research ==
Berry is a professor of electrical and computer engineering at Rose-Hulman Institute of Technology, where her academic interests include educational mobile robotics, human-robot interaction, and recruiting and retention of underrepresented populations in engineering. In 2008, Berry and her colleague Deborah Walter created the Rose Building Undergraduate Diversity (ROSE-BUD) program, which attracts talented female and underrepresented minority students in computer science and electrical, computer, and software engineering through scholarships and other program activities. Berry also worked with a cross-department team of faculty at Rose-Hulman to establish a multidisciplinary robotics minor degree program, for which she continues to serve as co-director. Berry has been a guest speaker at several Women in Engineering outreach events, and she has written articles for the New York Times and ASEE Prism magazine on her experiences as a professor from an underrepresented group.

Berry is the author of a children’s book series titled There’s a Robot!. Her goal is to introduce young people to STEM concepts.

== Awards and recognition ==
Berry has received several awards for her work increasing diversity in STEM fields including the Women and Hi Tech Leading Light award and the INSIGHT Into Diversity Inspiring Women in STEM award. In 2020, Berry was named Indiana FIRST Game Changer, One of 30 women in Robotics You need to Know about and Reinvented Magazine Interview of the Year award on Purpose and Passion. In 2021, Berry was named Dr. Lawrence J. Giacoletto Endowed Chair for Electrical and Computer Engineering. She was also awarded the TechPoint Foundation for Youth Bridge Builder award as part of the TechPoint Mira awards.^{,}^{,}

In June 2021, Berry was named Distinguished Fellow by the American Society for Engineering Education and IEEE Senior Fellow. In 2022, she earned multiple accolades and awards including 2023 IEEE Undergraduate Teaching Award, Society of Women Engineers 2022 Distinguished Engineering Educator Award, 2022 Distinguished Educator Award from the American Society of Engineering Education Electrical and Computer Engineering Division, and 2022 Open Source Hardware Trailblazer Fellow. In 2023, Berry was awarded the Abie Educational Innovation Award by AnitaB.org at the Grace Hopper Celebration in Orlando, FL. In 2024 she was named in the Forbes 50 Over 50 under the innovation list. Also in 2024, she was named the IEEE Education Society Distinguished Lecturer and the Children's Museum of Indianapolis Visiting Scientist.

== Selected publications ==
=== Books ===
- Berry, Carlotta A., and Brandeis Marshall. Mitigating Bias in Machine Learning. McGraw-Hill, October 2024. ISBN 9781264922710
- Berry, Carlotta A., What's the Matter with Orbit, Rebellion Lit, October 2024. ISBN 9798990893528
- Berry, Carlotta A., There's a Robot in my Troop, Rebellion Lit, July 2024. ISBN 9798990893511
- Berry, Carlotta A., There's a Robot in my Classroom, Rebellion Lit, June 2024. ISBN 9798990893504
- Berry, Carlotta A., There's a Robot at my Summer Camp, Rebellion Lit, May 2024. ISBN 9798218436025
- Berry, Carlotta A., There's a Robot at my Afterschool, Rebellion Lit, April, 2024. ISBN 9781736555293
- Berry, Carlotta A., There's a Robot in my Closet, Rebellion Lit, July 2023. ISBN 9781736555286
- Ardell, C. Breaking Point, Rebellion Lit, July 2023.
- Ardell, C. Elevated Inferno, Rebellion Lit, July 2022.

=== Papers ===
- Berry, C.A., Remy, S.L. and Rogers, T.E., “Robotics for All Ages: A Standard Robotics Curriculum for K-16,” IEEE Robotics & Automation Magazine, Institute of Electrical and Electronics Engineers, Vol. 23 (2), 40-46, June 2016. https://doi.org/10.1109/MRA.2016.2534240
- Berry, C.A., Mobile Robotics for Multidisciplinary Study: Synthesis Lectures on Control and Mechatronics, Morgan and Claypool, 2012. https://doi.org/10.2200/S00407ED1V01Y201203CRM004
- Berry, C.A., “Mobile Robotics: A tool for application-based integration of multidisciplinary undergraduate concepts and research”, Computers in Education Journal, Vol. 1, No. 3., pp. 102–111, 2010. https://peer.asee.org/15642
