= Elva Jones =

American computer scientist

Elva Johnson Jones is a professor and founding chair of the Department of Computer Science at Winston-Salem State University (WSSU), a position she has held since 1991.

== Early life and background ==
Elva Johnson Jones was born and raised on a tobacco farm in Louisburg, North Carolina. Her parents are Bettie and Sanford Jones and she has three siblings. She married Emory Jones, an alumnus and former WSSU faculty member; they had one son, Eugene who graduated from WSSU. Jones is a first-generation college student who came from a household which was supportive of her educational endeavors. Her parents did not have the opportunity to attend college, but they sacrificed the first harvest of every year's crop to pay tuition. She followed in the footsteps of her older sister to attend WSSU.

== Education ==
Jones earned her B.A. degree in business from Winston-Salem State University in 1970 before computer science was offered there. She then went on to the University of North Carolina at Greensboro where she earned her Master's in operations research. She went to Raleigh, North Carolina where she became the first African-American to obtain a doctorate in engineering and computer science from North Carolina State University.

== Career and research ==
Jones continued to work at WSSU while enrolled at UNCG as a Master's student. She was offered a job at NCSU after obtaining her PhD, which she declined. She returned to WSSU and later became the chair of the mathematics department. She founded the computer science department at WSSU.

Jones' interest in curriculum development came early on, before the Computer Science program has been established at WSSU. She would teach fellow students how to code during her lunch time. She led the University to develop a graduate program in data analytics. She helped WSSU add data science as a minor for undergraduate students.

As a grassroots organizer and educator, Jones became committed to mentoring the generations to come of minorities in STEM. She believes that female mentors are important to model careers in STEM for young girls and women to find their voice and potential.

Her research and studies have focused on acquiring funding to support programs and students. Since 2000, she has secured over $12 million for the computer science program at WSSU. In 2005, the university named the new computer science building in her honor. Her research interests include visualization, data retrieval (space science), multimedia systems, system design and development, human-computer interaction, and computer science education.

She published through SIGCSE (Special Interest Group on Computer Science Education) in 2018.

== Honors and achievements ==
Jones was a NASA JOVE Fellow at the Goddard Space Flight Center from 1994-1997. She was awarded the Outstanding Woman Leaders Award by the city of Winston-Salem in 2006. She was given the Ivory Dome Education Leadership Award in 2009 and was an honoree of Most Important African Americans in Technology in 2010. She was a Residence Fellow for Google Faculty in 2021. She was also Co-PI for the NSF Funded Grant: "Collaborative Research: CISE-MSI:RPEP: SaTC: HBCU Artificial Intelligence and Cybersecurity (AI-CyS) Research Partnership.”

== Professional organizations ==
Jones has been active in the Association of Computing Machinery, Institute of Electrical and Electronics Engineers, NSF National Canvasing Committee for CISE Directors Search, Big South Data Hub—Education Working Group, National Academics of Sciences, Engineering and Medicine: Best Practices for a Future Open Code Policy for NASA Space Science, and National Center for Women in Technology (NCWIT) Academic Alliance. She was appointed as commissioner and an evaluator for the ABET Computing Accreditation Commission for years 2010-1015 and 2022-2026. She joined the Board of Directors of the Association of Departments of Computer Science at Minority Institutions in 1996. She began actively serving for the NC Space Grant Consortium in 1997.
