= Khalia Braswell =

American computer scientist

Khalia Braswell is an American computer scientist, educator, and technologist. She is the founder and former executive director of INTech Camp for Girls, created to encourage girls of color to pursue learning about technology. Braswell earned a Doctor of Philosophy degree in education, focusing on math, science, and technology from Temple University in Philadelphia.

== Biography ==
Khalia Braswell was born in Rocky Mount, North Carolina, and moved to Charlotte when she was in the second grade. She earned her Bachelor of Science degree in computer science at North Carolina State University and her Master of Science degree in information technology at the University of North Carolina at Charlotte.

In 2014, Braswell created INTech Camp for Girls, a program that aims to inspire girls of color to pursue careers in technology. She moved to California after graduate school to work as an engineer at Apple. She resigned in 2018 and returned to Charlotte to run INTech full-time. Relinquishing her role as the executive director of INTech, Braswell began using her expertise as a researcher at Crunchbase.

== Awards ==
Braswell received the Walker's Legacy Women of Power award in 2018 and was included in The Root's 2018 list of 100 Most Influential African Americans.

== See also ==
- Alicia Nicki Washington
- Timnit Gebru
- Joy Buolamwini
