= Implicit data collection =

Implicit data collection refers to techniques in human–computer interaction and recommender systems that infer user preferences from observed behavior rather than explicit input.

== Overview ==
Implicit data are used to construct a user model from interaction traces such as clicks, purchases, or dwell time. These signals enable information filtering and personalization in recommender systems and search.

In recommender systems, implicit feedback is often modeled through techniques such as matrix factorization and pairwise ranking, which treat user interactions as positive-only or preference signals.

== Data sources ==
Implicit signals include behavioral and contextual data, such as:

- interaction logs (clicks, views, purchases)
- dwell time and browsing patterns
- contextual and device information
- multimodal signals (e.g., gaze, voice, or facial expression)

These signals are typically noisy and require modeling assumptions to distinguish preference from exposure.
