= Katherine Johnson =

American mathematician (1918–2020)

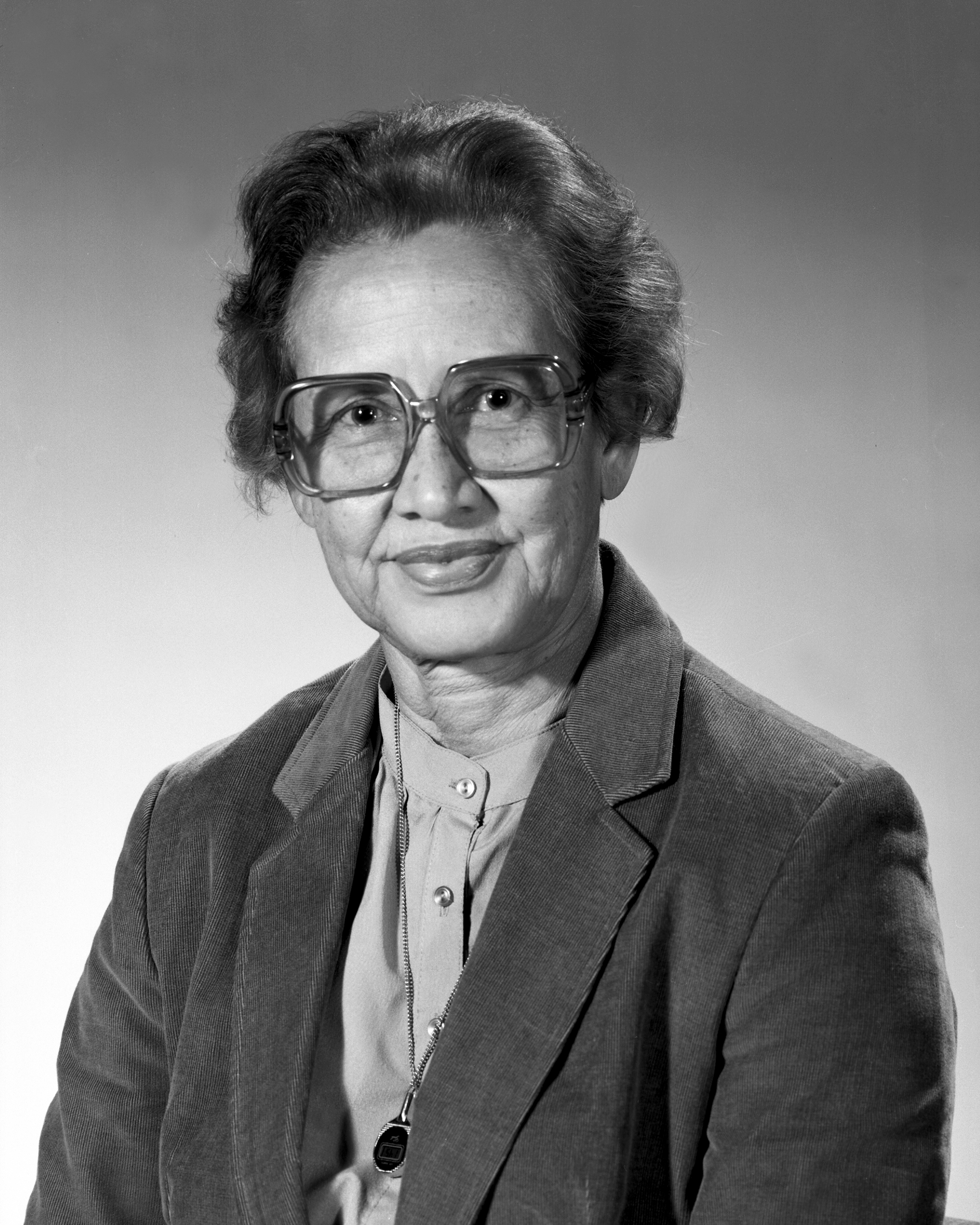
- Johnson in 1983
- Born: Creola Katherine Coleman; August 26, 1918; White Sulphur Springs, West Virginia, U.S.
- Died: February 24, 2020 (aged 101); Newport News, Virginia, U.S.
- Other name: Katherine Goble
- Education: West Virginia State University (BS)
- Occupations: Mathematician, human computer, computer programmer, mathematics teacher
- Employers: NACA; NASA (1953–1986)
- Known for: Calculating trajectories for NASA missions
- Spouses: James Goble (m. 1939; died 1956); Jim Johnson (m. 1959; died 2019)
- Children: 3
- Awards: Presidential Medal of Freedom (2015); Silver Snoopy Award (2016); NASA Group Achievement Award (2016); Congressional Gold Medal (2019)
- Website: katherinejohnson.net

Creola Katherine Johnson (née Coleman, previously Goble; August 26, 1918 – February 24, 2020) was an American mathematician and human computer whose calculations of orbital mechanics as a NASA employee were critical to the success of the first and subsequent U.S. crewed spaceflights. During her 33-year career at NASA and its predecessor, the National Advisory Committee for Aeronautics, she earned a reputation for mastering complex manual calculations and helped pioneer the use of computers to perform tasks previously requiring humans. The space agency noted her "historical role as one of the first African-American women to work as a NASA scientist".

Johnson's work included calculating trajectories, launch windows, and emergency return paths for Project Mercury spaceflights, including those for astronauts Alan Shepard (the first American in space) and John Glenn (the first American in orbit), and rendezvous paths for the Apollo Lunar Module and command module on flights to the Moon. Her calculations were also essential to the beginning of the Space Shuttle program, and she worked on plans for a human mission to Mars.

In 2015 President Barack Obama awarded Johnson the Presidential Medal of Freedom. In 2016, she received the Silver Snoopy Award from NASA astronaut Leland D. Melvin and a NASA Group Achievement Award. She was portrayed by Taraji P. Henson in the 2016 film Hidden Figures. In 2019, the United States Congress awarded Johnson the Congressional Gold Medal and NASA announced the establishment of the Katherine Johnson Independent Verification and Validation Facility in her home state of West Virginia. In 2021, she was posthumously inducted into the National Women's Hall of Fame.

== Early life ==
Katherine Johnson was born Creola Katherine Coleman on August 26, 1918, in White Sulphur Springs, West Virginia, to Joylette Roberta (née Lowe) and Joshua McKinley Coleman. She was the youngest of four children. Her mother was a teacher and her father was a lumberman, farmer, and handyman. He also worked at the Greenbrier Hotel.

Johnson showed strong mathematical ability from an early age. Because Greenbrier County did not offer public schooling for African-American students beyond eighth grade, the Colemans arranged for their children to attend a high school in Institute, West Virginia, on the West Virginia State College (WVSC) campus; Johnson enrolled when she was ten years old. The family split their time between Institute during the school year and White Sulphur Springs in the summer.

External videos
- Interview with West Virginia State University President Anthony Jenkins on Johnson's studies and career, October 21, 2019, C-SPAN

After graduating from high school at age 14, Johnson matriculated at WVSC, a historically black college. She took every mathematics course the college offered. Several professors mentored her, including the chemist and mathematician Angie Turner King, who had guided Coleman throughout high school, and W. W. Schieffelin Claytor, the third African-American to receive a doctorate in mathematics. Claytor added new courses just for Johnson. In 1937, at age 18, she graduated summa cum laude with degrees in mathematics and French. Johnson was a member of Alpha Kappa Alpha. She took a teaching job at a black public school in Marion, Virginia.

In 1939 after marrying her first husband, James Goble, she left her teaching job and enrolled in a graduate mathematics program. She quit at the end of the first session to focus on her family life. She was the first African-American woman to attend graduate school at West Virginia University in Morgantown, West Virginia. Through WVSC's president, John W. Davis, she became one of three African-American students, and the only woman, selected to integrate the graduate school after the 1938 United States Supreme Court ruling Missouri ex rel. Gaines v. Canada required states that provide public higher education to white students to also provide it to black students by establishing black colleges and universities or by admitting black students to formerly white-only universities.

== Career ==
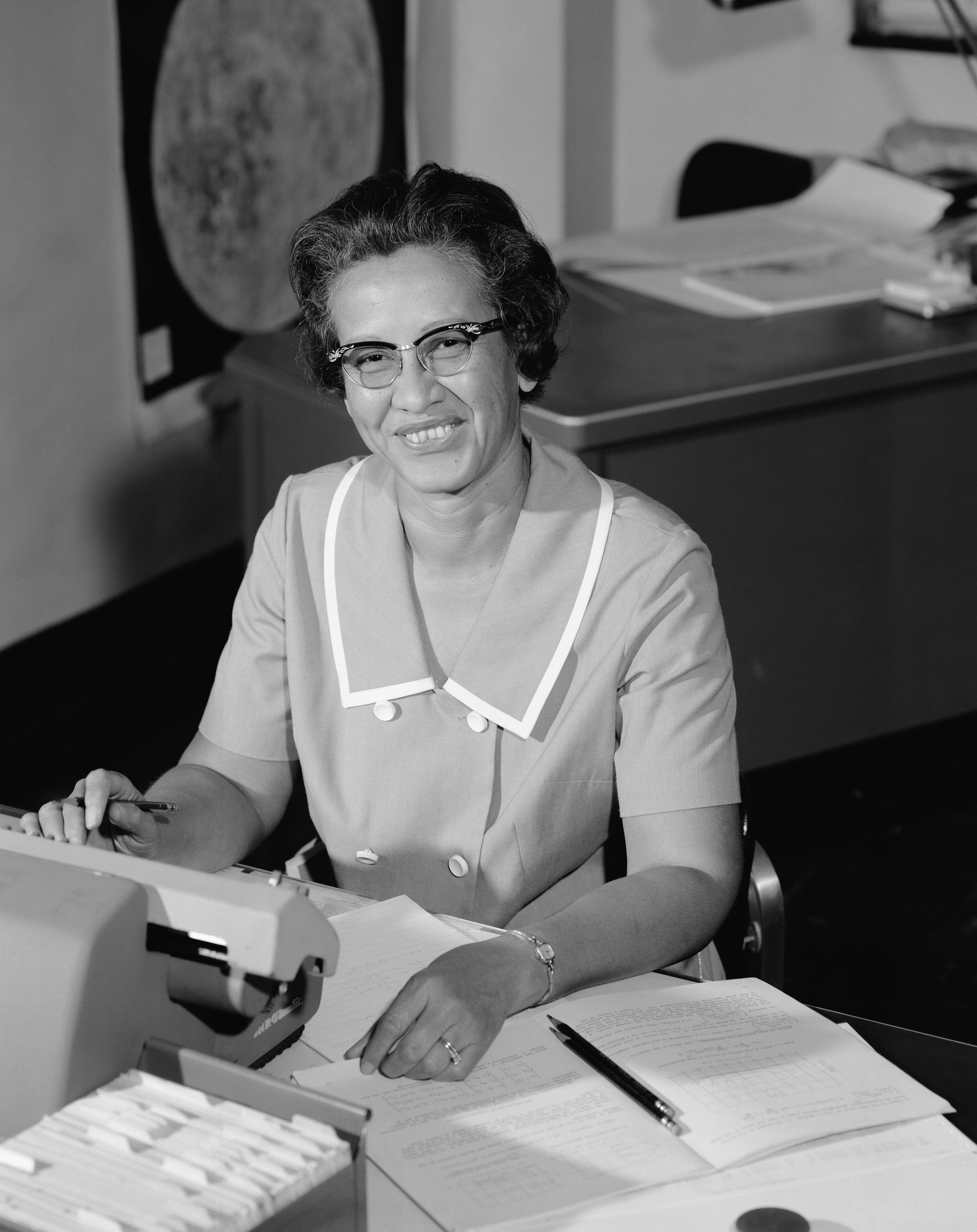
Johnson working at the Spacecraft Controls Branch of NASA in 1966.

After her daughters grew up, Johnson returned to teaching. In 1952, a relative mentioned that the National Advisory Committee for Aeronautics (NACA) was hiring for its West Area computing section. At the Langley Memorial Aeronautical Laboratory, based in Hampton, Virginia, near Langley Field, NACA hired African-American mathematicians as well as whites for their Guidance and Navigation Department. Johnson accepted a job offer from the agency in June 1953. For Johnson to take the job, her family moved to Newport News.

According to an oral history archived by the National Visionary Leadership Project:

At first she [Johnson] worked in a pool of women performing mathematical calculations. Katherine has referred to the women in the pool as virtual "computers who wore skirts". Their main job was to read the data from the plane's black boxes and carry out other precise mathematical tasks. Then one day, Katherine (and a colleague) were temporarily assigned to help the all-male flight research team. Katherine's knowledge of analytic geometry helped make quick allies of male bosses and colleagues to the extent that "they forgot to return me to the pool". While the racial and gender barriers were always there, Katherine ignored them. Katherine was assertive, asking to be included in editorial meetings (where no women had gone before). She simply told people she had done the work and that she belonged.

From 1953 to 1958 Johnson worked as a computer, performing calculations for topics like gust alleviation for aircraft. Originally assigned to the West Area Computers section supervised by Dorothy Vaughan, Johnson was reassigned to the Guidance and Control Division of Langley's Flight Research Division. It was staffed by white male engineers. In keeping with the State of Virginia's racial segregation laws and federal workplace segregation introduced under President Woodrow Wilson, Johnson and the other African-American women in the computing pool were required to work, eat, and use restrooms in separate facilities from those of their white colleagues. Their office was labeled "Colored Computers". In an interview with WHRO-TV, Johnson said she "didn't feel the segregation at NASA, because everybody there was doing research. You had a mission and you worked on it, and it was important to you to do your job [...] and play bridge at lunch." She added: "I didn't feel any segregation. I knew it was there, but I didn't feel it."

NACA disbanded the colored computing pool in 1958 when the agency was superseded by NASA, which adopted digital computers. Although the installation was desegregated, forms of discrimination were still pervasive. Johnson recalled:

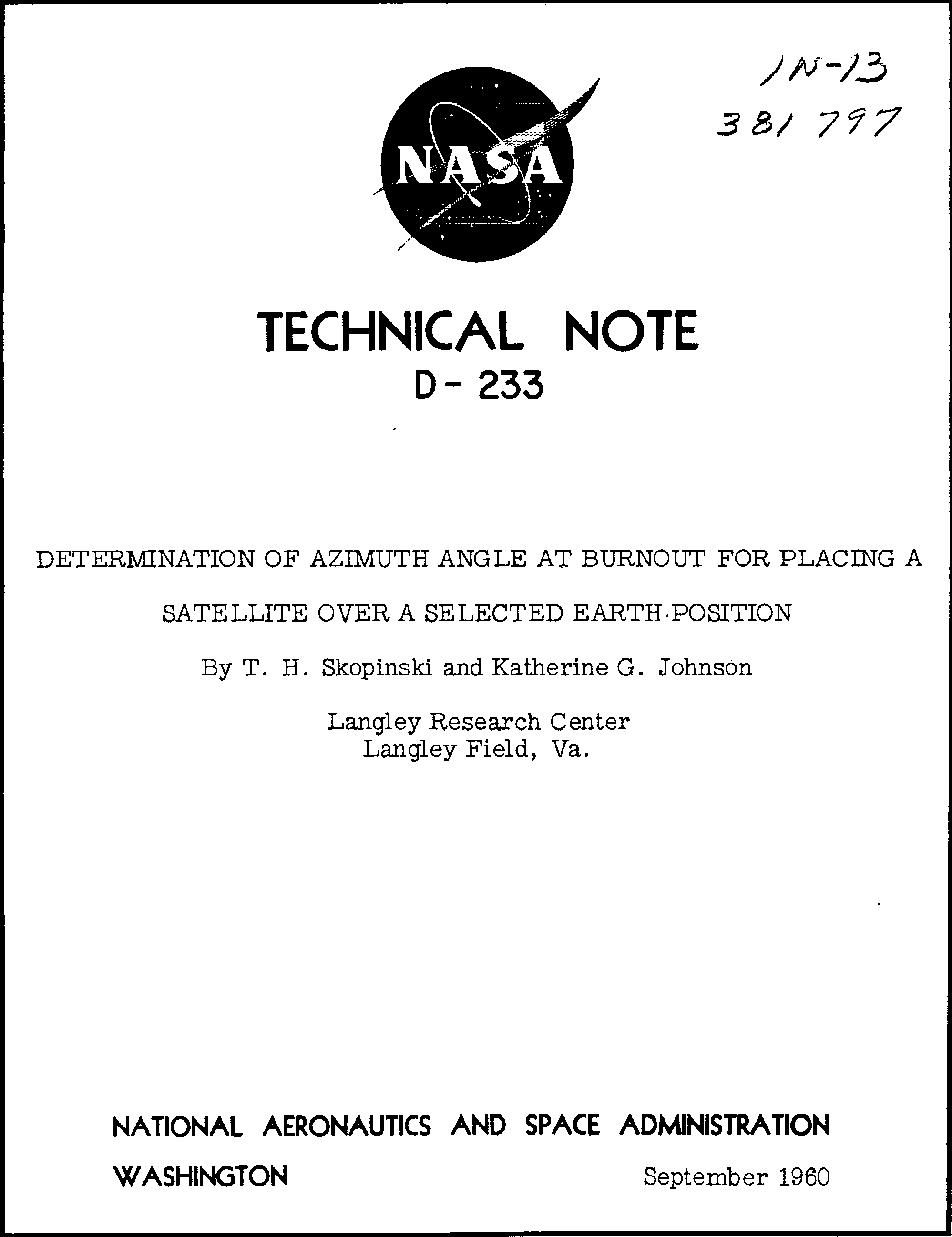
The first NASA report showing Johnson's name as co-author.

We needed to be assertive as women in that days—assertive and aggressive—and the degree to which we had to be that way depended on where you were. I had to be. In the early days of NASA women were not allowed to put their names on the reports—no woman in my division had had her name on a report. I was working with Ted Skopinski and he wanted to leave and go to Houston [...] but Henry Pearson, our supervisor—he was not a fan of women—kept pushing him to finish the report we were working on. Finally, Ted told him, "Katherine should finish the report, she's done most of the work anyway." So Ted left Pearson with no choice; I finished the report and my name went on it, and that was the first time a woman in our division had her name on something.

From 1958 until her retirement in 1986, Johnson worked as a computer for NACA's successor, the Spacecraft Controls Branch. She calculated the trajectory for the May 5, 1961, space flight of Alan Shepard, the first American in space. She also calculated the launch window for his 1961 Mercury mission. She plotted backup navigation charts for astronauts in case of electronic failures. When NASA used electronic computers for the first time to calculate John Glenn's orbit around earth, officials asked Johnson to verify the computer's numbers; Glenn had asked for her specifically and had refused to fly unless Johnson verified the calculations.

As a computer, she calculated the trajectory for Alan Shepard, the first American in space...John Glenn requested that she personally recheck the calculations...before his flight aboard Friendship 7...on which he became the first American to orbit the Earth.

Author Margot Lee Shetterly wrote, "So the astronaut who became a hero looked to this black woman in the still-segregated South at the time as one of the key parts of making sure his mission would be a success." She added that, in a time when computing was "women's work" and engineering was left to men, "it really does have to do with us over the course of time sort of not valuing that work that was done by women, however necessary, as much as we might. And it has taken history to get a perspective on that."

Johnson later worked directly with digital computers. Her ability and reputation for accuracy helped establish confidence in the new technology. In 1961, her work helped to ensure that Alan Shepard's Freedom 7 Mercury capsule was found quickly after landing, using the accurate trajectory that had been established.

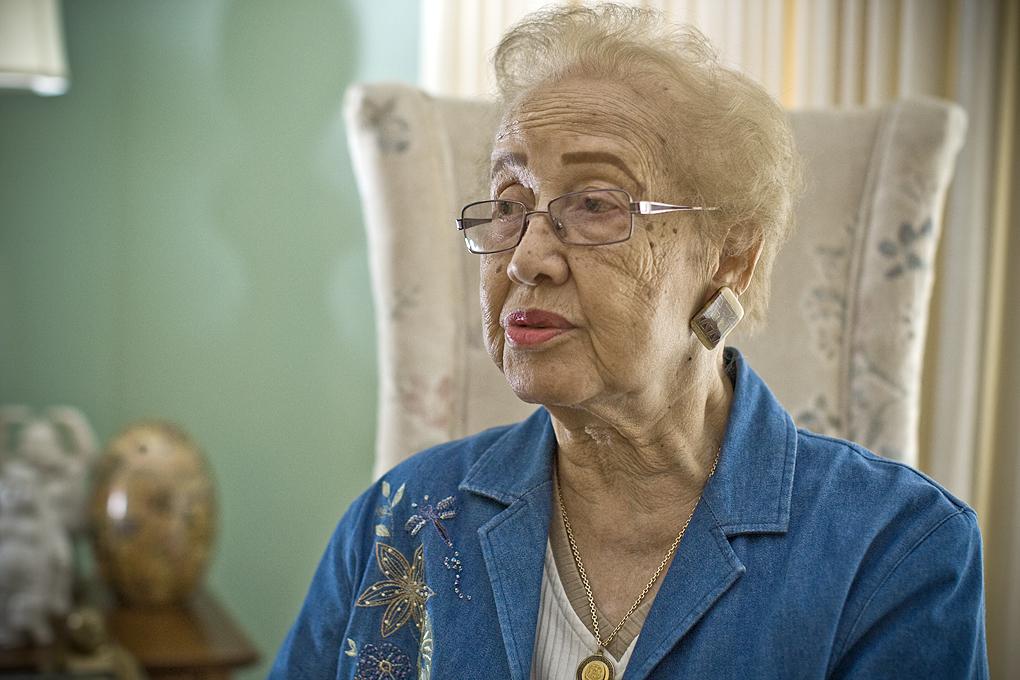
Johnson in 2008

She also helped to calculate the trajectory for the 1969 Apollo 11 flight to the Moon. During the Moon landing, Johnson was at a meeting in the Pocono Mountains. She and a few others crowded around a small television screen watching the first steps on the Moon. In 1970, Johnson worked on the Apollo 13 Moon mission. When the mission was aborted, her work on backup procedures and charts helped set a safe path for the crew's return to Earth, creating a one-star observation system to allow astronauts to determine their location accurately. In a 2010 interview, Johnson recalled, "Everybody was concerned about them getting there. We were concerned about them getting back." Later in her career, she worked on the Space Shuttle program, the Earth Resources Satellite, and on plans for a human mission to Mars.

Johnson spent her later years encouraging students to enter the fields of science, technology, engineering, and mathematics (STEM).

== Personal life and death ==
Katherine and James Francis Goble had three daughters. The family lived in Newport News, Virginia, from 1953. James died of an inoperable brain tumor in 1956 and in 1959 Katherine married James A. "Jim" Johnson, a United States Army officer and veteran of the Korean War; they were married for 60 years, until his death in 2019 at age 93. Johnson, who had six grandchildren and 11 great-grandchildren, lived in Hampton, Virginia. She encouraged her grandchildren and students to pursue careers in science and technology.

For 50 years Johnson was a member of Carver Memorial Presbyterian Church, where she sang as part of the choir.

Johnson died at a Newport News retirement home on February 24, 2020, at age 101. After her death, NASA administrator Jim Bridenstine called her "an American hero" and said "her pioneering legacy will never be forgotten."

== Legacy and honors ==
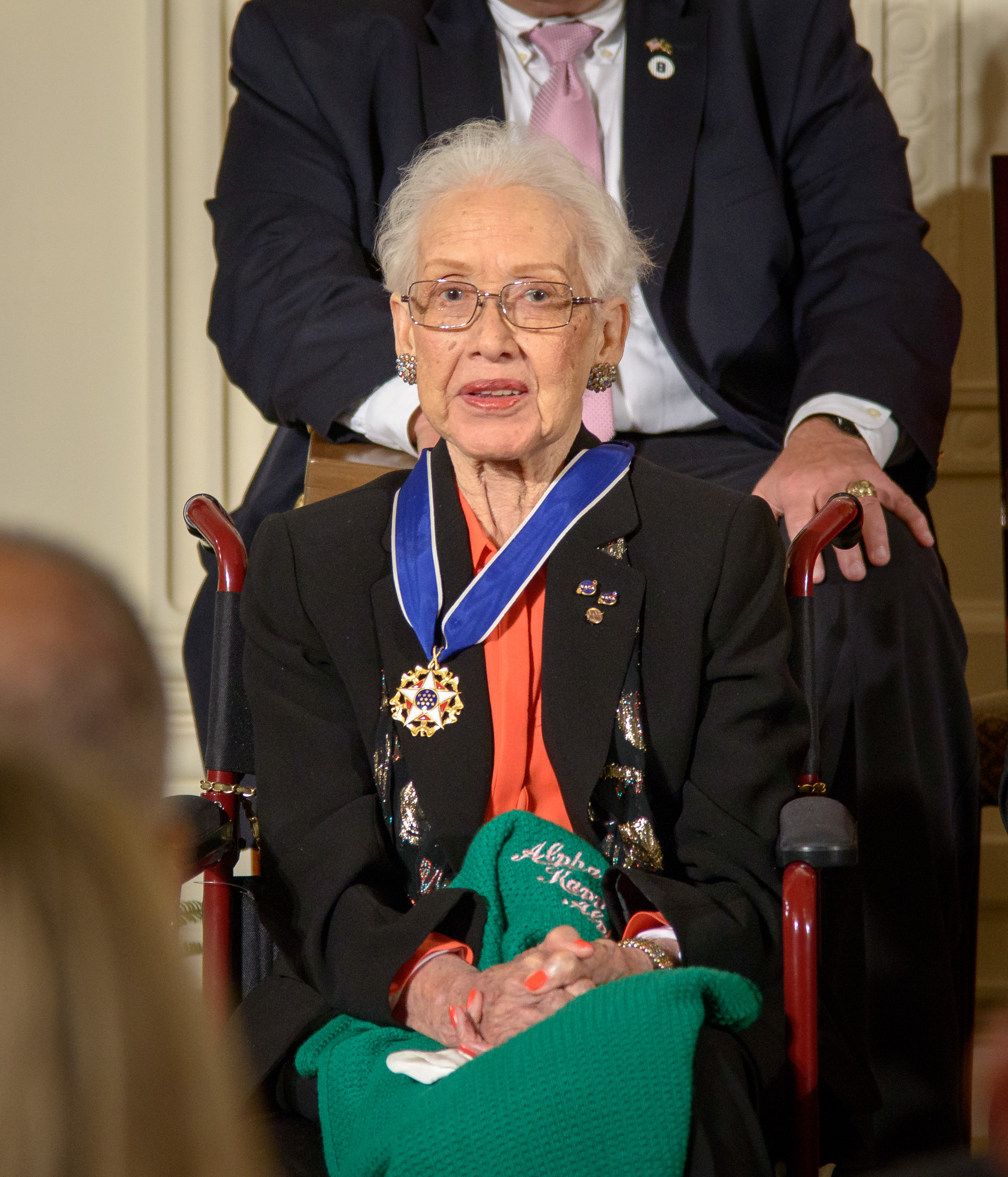
The Presidential Medal of Freedom was awarded to Johnson in 2015.

Johnson coauthored 26 scientific papers. Her social influence as a pioneer in space science and computing is demonstrated by the honors she received and her status as a role model for a life in science. Johnson was named West Virginia State College Outstanding Alumnus of the Year in 1999. On November 24, 2015, President Barack Obama presented her with the Presidential Medal of Freedom. She was cited as a pioneering example of African-American women in STEM. Obama said, "Katherine G. Johnson refused to be limited by society's expectations of her gender and race while expanding the boundaries of humanity's reach." NASA noted her "historical role as one of the first African-American women to work as a NASA scientist".

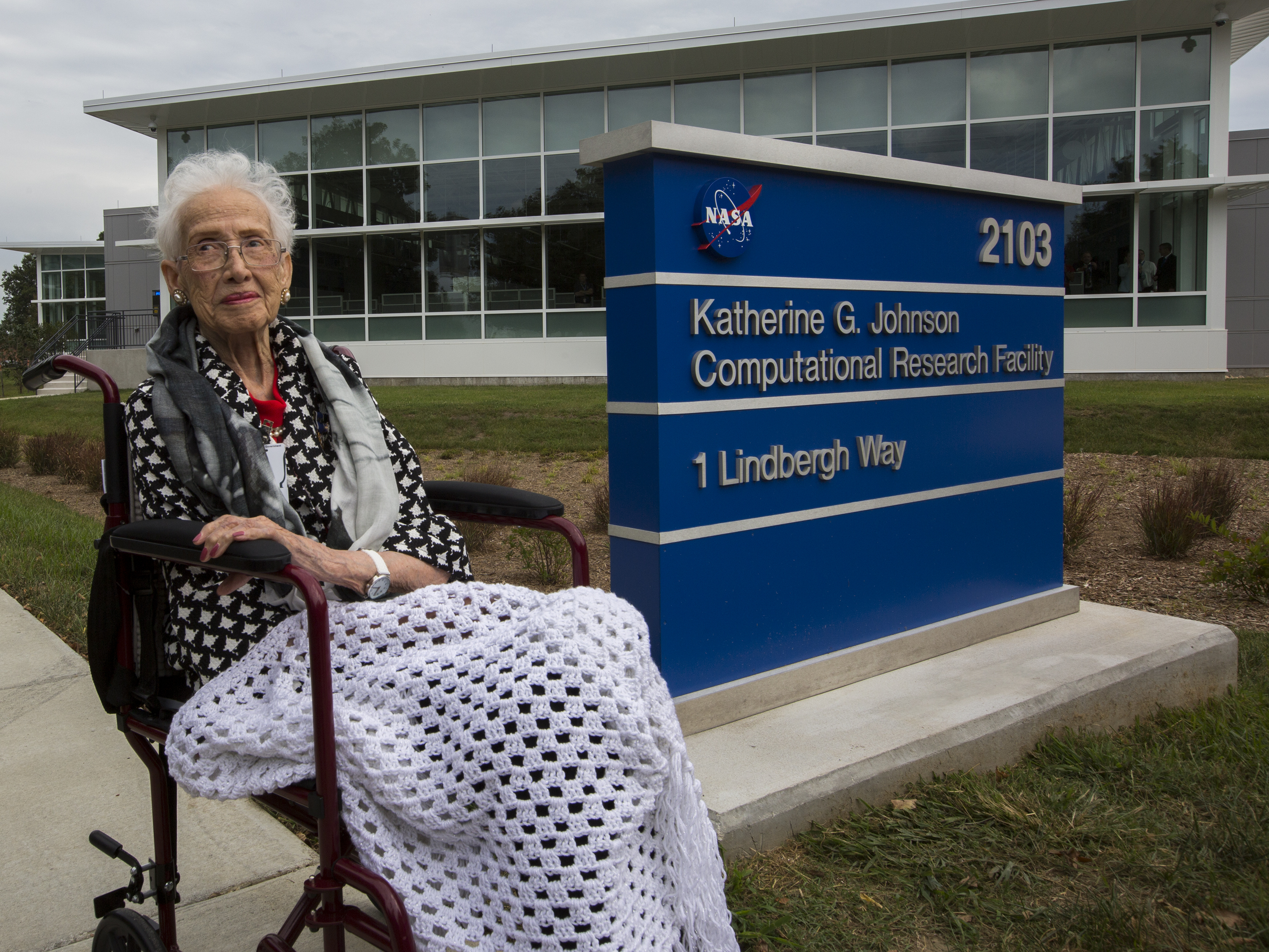
Johnson in front of the Computational Research Facility named for her.

Two NASA facilities have been named in her honor. On May 5, 2016, a new 40,000-square-foot (3,700 m^{2}) building was named the "Katherine G. Johnson Computational Research Facility" and formally dedicated at the agency's Langley Research Center in Hampton, Virginia. The facility opened on September 22, 2017. Johnson attended the event, which also marked the 55th anniversary of Shepard's historic rocket launch and splashdown, a success Johnson helped achieve. At the ceremony, deputy director Lewin said: "Millions of people around the world watched Shepard's flight, but what they didn't know at the time was that the calculations that got him into space and safely home were done by today's guest of honor, Katherine Johnson". During the event, Johnson also received a Silver Snoopy award, often called the astronaut's award. NASA said it is given to those "who have made outstanding contributions to flight safety and mission success". On February 22, 2019, NASA renamed the Independent Verification and Validation Facility in Fairmont, West Virginia, the Katherine Johnson Independent Verification and Validation Facility.

Johnson was included on the BBC's list of 100 Women of influence worldwide in 2016. In a 2016 video, NASA said, "Her calculations proved as critical to the success of the Apollo Moon landing program and the start of the Space Shuttle program as they did to those first steps on the country's journey into space."

External videos
- Presentation by Margot Lee Shetterly on Hidden Figures at the Hampton History Museum, September 8, 2016, C-SPAN
- Discussion with Shetterly on Hidden Figures at the National Book Festival, September 2, 2017, C-SPAN

Science writer Maia Weinstock developed a prototype Lego for Women of NASA in 2016 and included Johnson; she declined to have her likeness printed on the final product. On May 12, 2018, the College of William & Mary awarded Johnson an honorary doctorate. In August 2018, West Virginia State University established a STEM scholarship in Johnson's honor and erected a life-size statue of her on campus. In 2018, Mattel announced a Barbie doll in Johnson's likeness with a NASA identity badge. In 2019, Government Executive included Johnson in the inaugural class of its Government Hall of Fame.

In August 2018 the DeSoto Independent School District in DeSoto, Texas, opened the Katherine Johnson Technology Magnet Academy, a kindergarten through fifth-grade school offering a technology-based curriculum including robotics, coding, computer science, digital art, and music.

In June 2019 George Mason University named the most prominent building on its SciTech campus Katherine G. Johnson Hall.

In 2020 Bethel School District, Washington, named its newest school Katherine G. Johnson Elementary.

Also in 2020 the United States Space Force named the GPS 3 Space Vehicle 8 satellite Creola Katherine Johnson. It was launched into orbit on May 30, 2025.

On November 2, 2020 Fairfax County Public Schools—the largest school division in Virginia and 12th-largest school division in the U.S.—and the City of Fairfax, Virginia, announced that the Fairfax school board had voted to rename its middle school formerly named for Confederate soldier, poet, and musician Sidney Lanier Katherine Johnson Middle School (KJMS) after 85% of Fairfax residents voted to do so.

On November 6, 2020, a satellite named after Johnson (ÑuSat 15 or "Katherine", COSPAR 2020-079G) was launched into space. In February 2021, Northrop Grumman named its Cygnus NG-15 spacecraft to supply the International Space Station the SS Katherine Johnson.

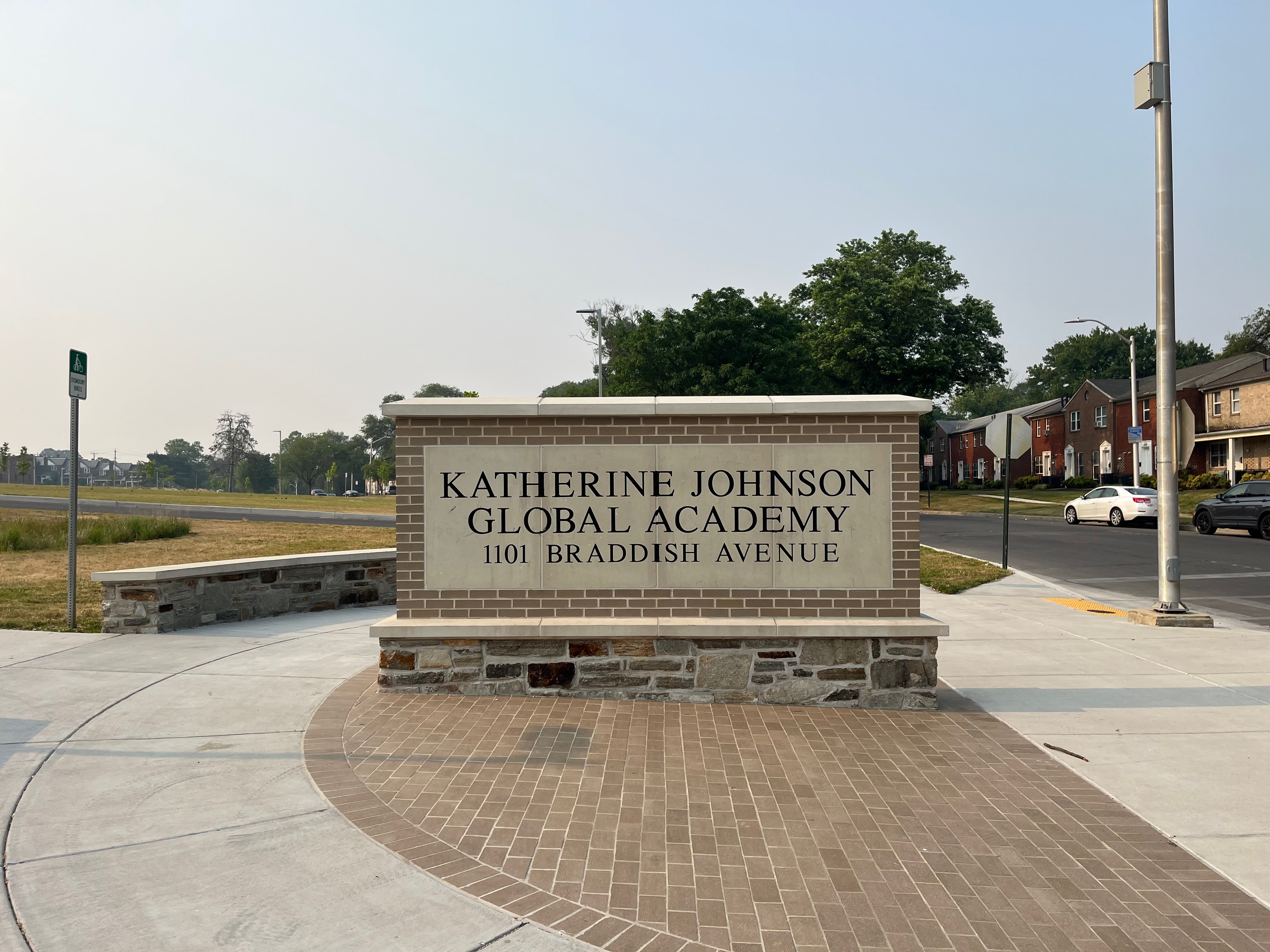
Sign of the Katherine Johnson Global Academy in Baltimore, Maryland

In 2021, San Juan Unified School District in Sacramento, California, named its newest school Katherine Johnson Middle School. Also in 2021, the Baltimore County Public Schools named one of its three new schools Katherine Johnson Global Academy.

== Depiction in media ==
The film Hidden Figures, released in December 2016, is based on Margot Lee Shetterly's nonfiction book of the same title, which was published earlier that year. It follows Johnson and the other African-American women, Mary Jackson and Dorothy Vaughan, who worked as computers at NASA. Taraji P. Henson plays Johnson. Appearing alongside Henson at the 89th Academy Awards, Johnson received a standing ovation from the audience. In an earlier interview, Johnson said of the movie: "It was well done. The three leading ladies did an excellent job portraying us." In the 2016 episode "Space Race" of the NBC series Timeless, Johnson is portrayed by Nadine Ellis.

== Awards ==
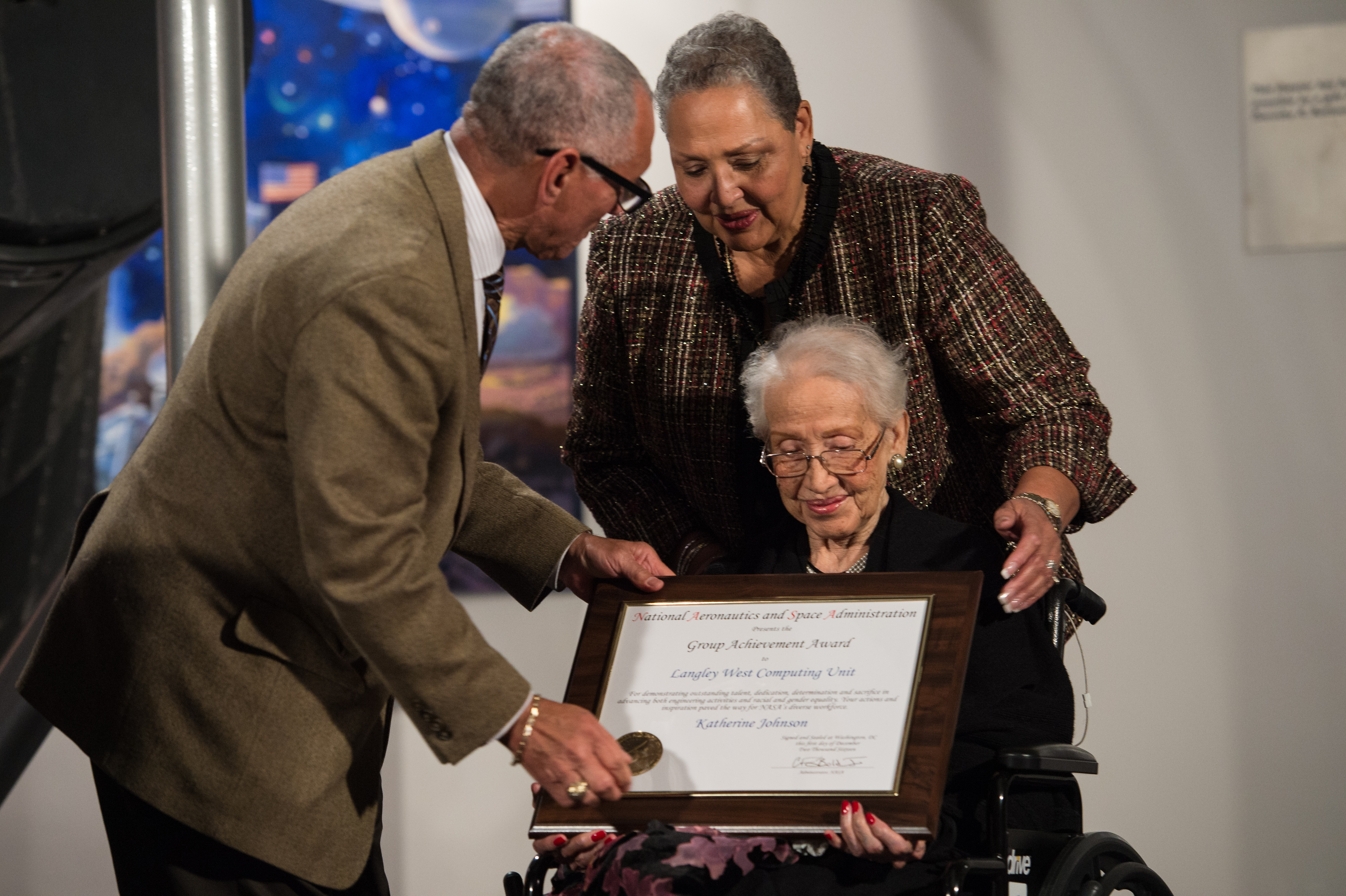
Johnson receiving a NASA Group Achievement Award

- 1971, 1980, 1984, 1985, 1986: NASA Langley Research Center Special Achievement award
- 1977, NASA Group Achievement Award presented to the Lunar Spacecraft and Operations team for pioneering work in the field of navigation supporting the spacecraft that orbited and mapped the Moon in preparation for the Apollo program
- 1998, Honorary Doctor of Laws, from SUNY Farmingdale
- 1999, West Virginia State College Outstanding Alumnus of the Year
- 2006, Honorary Doctor of Science by the Capitol College, Laurel, Maryland
- 2010, Honorary Doctorate of Science from Old Dominion University, Norfolk, Virginia
- 2014, De Pizan Honor from National Women's History Museum
- 2015, NCWIT Pioneer in Tech Award
- 2015, Presidential Medal of Freedom
- 2016, Silver Snoopy award from Leland Melvin
- 2016, Astronomical Society of the Pacific's Arthur B.C. Walker II Award
- 2016, Presidential Honorary Doctorate of Humane Letters from West Virginia University, Morgantown, West Virginia
- On December 1, 2016, Johnson received the Langley West Computing Unit NASA Group Achievement Award at a reception at the Virginia Air and Space Center. Other awardees included her colleagues Dorothy Vaughan and Mary Jackson.
- 2017, Daughters of the American Revolution (DAR) Medal of Honor
- 2017 Honorary Doctorate from Spelman College
- May 12, 2018, Honorary Doctorate of Science from the College of William & Mary, Williamsburg, Virginia
- On April 29, 2019, the University of Johannesburg and its Faculty of Science conferred Johnson with the degree of Philosophiae Doctor Honoris causa for her pioneering role at NASA.
- November 8, 2019, Congressional Gold Medal
- 2021, Induction into the National Women's Hall of Fame
- 2024, Induction into the National Aviation Hall of Fame

== See also ==
- List of African-American women in STEM fields
- List of West Virginia University alumni
- Mathematical Tables Project, pioneering human computer group
- Timeline of women in science
