= Jakita O. Thomas =

American computer scientist, computer engineer, educator

- Education: Spelman College; Georgia Institute of Technology
- Scientific career
- Fields: Computer science and engineering
- Workplaces: Auburn University

Jakita O. Thomas is a Philpott Westpoint Stevens Associate Professor of Computer Science and Software Engineering at Auburn University. Thomas is one of the co-founders of Pharaoh's Conclave, an organisation helping engage and prepare youth for careers and opportunities related to eSports. Thomas is also a founder of Black ComputeHer which is an organisation dedicated to supporting computing tech education and workforce development for Black women and girls.

Thomas graduated from Spelman College in 1999 with a Bachelor of Science degree in computer and information science, with a minor in mathematics. In 2006, she was granted a Ph.D. in computer science and focusing on the learning sciences and technology by the Georgia Institute of Technology in Atlanta, GA, where she was a Presidential Fellow, National Physical Science Consortium Fellow, tutor, mentor, and research assistant.

== Awards ==
Thomas received the National Science Foundation’s Faculty Early Career Development Award (2012 – 2019). She also received the Presidential Early Career Award for Scientists and Engineers (2016).

Thomas was named one of 1,000 inspiring black scientists in America by Cell Mentor.
