= Baddies in Tech =

American non-profit, technology education organization

Baddies in Tech is an American organization that provides a safe space for Black women in the technology sectors to network and grow their careers. The founding of Baddies in Tech in 2019 led to the creation of BaddieCon.

== History ==
Baddies in tech originated in 2019 as an Instagram hashtag created by Allie Joy Tsahey as she had felt isolated in the male dominated tech industry. The hashtag grew in popularity leading to the creation of the organization. In 2023 Baddies in Tech hosted its first BaddieCon event, which featured 38 speakers and 11 companies and vendors.

== Organization ==
Baddies in Tech is a nonprofit DAO headquartered in Brooklyn, NY founded by Allie Joy Tsahey in 2019. Baddies in Tech's mission is “to build a public good that empowers and uplifts Black and brown female technologists globally.” Baddies in Tech also provides a database of resources for those looking for employment opportunities. Furthermore, the Baddies in Tech organization hosts community events in NYC, D.C., and Atlanta and tech conferences geared toward providing women a safe place to come together. Baddies in Tech maintains a Discord server as a place of conversation for their community.
