= List of African-American inventors and scientists =

This list of African-American inventors and scientists documents many of the African-Americans who have invented a multitude of items or made discoveries in the course of their lives. These have ranged from practical everyday devices to applications and scientific discoveries in diverse fields, including physics, biology, math, and medicine.

== History ==
African-Americans have been the victims of oppression, discrimination and persecution throughout American history, with an impact on African-American innovation according to a 2014 study by economist Lisa D. Cook, which linked violence towards African-Americans and lack of legal protections over the period from 1870 to 1940 with lowered innovation. Despite this, many black innovators have been responsible for a large number of major inventions.

Among the earliest was George Washington Carver, whose reputation was based on his research into and promotion of alternative crops to cotton, which aided in nutrition for farm families. He wanted poor farmers to grow alternative crops both as a source of their own food and as a source of other products to improve their way of life. The most popular of his 44 practical bulletins for farmers contained 105 food recipes using peanuts. He also developed and promoted about 100 products made from peanuts that were useful for the house and farm. He received numerous honors for his work, including the Spingarn Medal of the NAACP.

A later renowned scientist was Percy Lavon Julian, a research chemist and a pioneer in the chemical synthesis of medicinal drugs from plants. He was the first to synthesize the natural product physostigmine, and a pioneer in the industrial large-scale chemical synthesis of the human hormones, steroids, progesterone, and testosterone, from plant sterols such as stigmasterol and sitosterol. His work would lay the foundation for the steroid drug industry's production of cortisone, other corticosteroids, and birth control pills.

A contemporary example of a modern-day inventor is Lonnie George Johnson, an engineer. Johnson invented the Super Soaker water gun, which was the top-selling toy in the United States from 1991 to 1992. In 1980 Johnson formed his own law firm and licensed the Super Soaker water gun to Larami Corporation. Two years later, the Super Soaker generated over $200 million in retail sales and became the best selling toy in North America. Larami Corporation was eventually purchased by Hasbro, the second-largest toy manufacturer in the world. Over the years, Super Soaker sales have totaled close to one billion dollars. Johnson reinvested a majority of his earnings from the Super Soaker into research and development for his energy technology companies – "It's who I am, it's what I do." As of 2019, Johnson holds over 120 patents, with more pending, and is the author of several publications on spacecraft power systems.

== List ==
Name	Years	Occupations	Inventions / accomplishments	References
Abebe, Rediet	1991-	computer scientist	First woman computer scientist to be appointed to the Harvard Society of Fellows	
Adams, Christopher		scientist, entrepreneur, and inventor	Founded and led (as chief executive officer) multiple biotechnology companies, including Mosaic Technologies and Andarix Pharmaceuticals	
Adkins, Rodney	1958–	Electrical engineer	First African-American to serve as a senior vice president at IBM, helped develop IBM ThinkPad	
Alcorn, George Edward Jr.	1940–2024	Physicist, inventor	Invented a method of fabricating an imaging X-ray spectrometer	
Alexander, Archie	1888–1958	Civil engineer	Responsible for the construction of many roads and bridges, including the Whitehurst Freeway, the Tidal Basin Bridge, and an extension to the Baltimore-Washington Parkway.	
Alexander, Claudia	1959–2015	geophysics and planetary science research scientist	Last project manager of NASA's Galileo mission to Jupiter and until the time of her death had served as project manager and scientist of NASA's role in the European-led Rosetta mission to study Comet Churyumov–Gerasimenko	
Ammons, Virgie	December 29, 1908 – July 12, 2000	Inventor	Filed the fireplace throat damper patent on August 6, 1974.	
Amos, Harold	1918–2003	Microbiologist	First African-American department chair at Harvard Medical School	
Bailey, Leonard C.	1825–1918	Inventor	Collapsible, folding bed: (For the cabinet folding bed, forerunner to the "Murphy bed", patented by Sarah E. Goode in 1885, see her entry at Goode, this page.)	
Ball, Alice Augusta	1892–1916	Chemist	Developed a technique to make chaulmoogra oil injectable and absorbable, for the first effective treatment of Hansen's disease (leprosy)	
Banneker, Benjamin	1731–1806	Almanac author; surveyor; farmer	Constructed wooden clock; astronomer; assisted in the survey of the original boundaries of the District of Columbia; authored a series of almanacs and ephemerides; naturalist: recorded observations on emergences of periodical cicadas and on the behavior of honey bees.	
Banyaga, Augustin	1947–	Mathematician	Work on diffeomorphisms and symplectomorphisms	
Bashen, Janet	1957–	Inventor, entrepreneur, professional consultant	First African-American woman to receive a patent for a web-based software invention, LinkLine, an Equal Employment Opportunity case management and tracking software	
Bath, Patricia	1942–2019	Ophthalmologist	First African-American female physician to receive a patent for a medical invention; inventions relate to cataract surgery and include the Laserphaco Probe, which revolutionized the industry in the 1980s, and an ultrasound technique for treatment	
Beard, Andrew	1849–1921	Farmer, carpenter, blacksmith, railroad worker, businessman, inventor	Janney coupler improvements; invented the car device #594,059 dated November 23, 1897; rotary engine patent #478,271 dated July 5, 1892	
Bell, Earl S.	1977–	Inventor, entrepreneur, architect, industrial designer	Invented chair with sliding skin (2004) and the quantitative display apparatus (2005)	
Benjamin, Miriam	1861–1947	Inventor, educator	Invented "Gong and Signal Chair for Hotels"; second African-American woman to receive a patent	
Berger-Sweeney, Joanne	1958-	neuroscientist	First woman and the first African American to lead Trinity College (Connecticut)	
Berry, Leonidas	1902–1995	Gastroenterologist	Gastroscope pioneer	
Bharucha-Reid, Albert T.	1927–1985	Mathematician, statistician	Probability theory and Markov chain theorist	
Black, Keith	1957–	Neurosurgeon	Brain tumor surgery and research	
Blackwell, David	1919–2010	Mathematician, statistician	First proposed the Blackwell channel model used in coding theory and information theory; one of the eponyms of the Rao–Blackwell theorem, which is a process that significantly improves crude statistical estimators	
Blair, Henry	1807–1860	Inventor	Second black inventor to issue a patent; invented seed planter and cotton planter.	
Boahen, Kwabena	1964–	Bioengineer	Silicon retina able to process images in the same manner as a living retina	
Boone, Sarah	1832–1905	Inventor	Ironing board allowing sleeves of women's garments to be ironed more easily	
Bouchet, Edward	1852–1918	Physicist	First African-American to receive a PhD in any subject; received physics doctorate from Yale University in 1876	
Bowman, James	1923–2011	Physician	Pathologist and geneticist; Professor Emeritus Pritzker School of Medicine; first tenured African-American professor at the University of Chicago Division of Biological Sciences	
Boykin, Otis	1920–1982	Inventor, engineer	Artificial heart pacemaker control unit	
Brady, St. Elmo	1884–1966	Chemist	Published three scholarly abstracts in Science; collaborated on a paper published in the Journal of Industrial and Engineering Chemistry	
Brannon, Horace Signor	1884–1970	Physician	World War I veteran, military physician who served in the 93rd Infantry Division	
Branson, Herman	1914–1995	Physicist, educator	Protein structure research	
Brooks, Charles	1865– ?	Inventor	Street sweeper truck and a type of paper punch	
Brown, Henry	1832– ?	Inventor	Invented fire safe	
Brown, Marie Van Brittan	1922–1999	Inventor	Invented the home security system	
Brown, Oscar E.	18xx– ?	Inventor	Received a patent for an improved horseshoe	
Burr, John Albert	18xx– ?	Inventor	Rotary-blade lawn mower patent	
Cannon, Thomas C.	1943–	Inventor	Led a group of engineers who developed the Tactical Optical Fiber Connector (TOFC), the first fiber optic connector deployed under battlefield conditions, and the ST Connector that helped make fiber optic communications affordable.	
Cardozo, William Warrick	1905–1962	Pediatrician	Sickle cell anemia studies; in October 1937 he published "Immunologic Studies in Sickle Cell Anemia" in the Archives of Internal Medicine; many of the findings are still valid today	
Carruthers, George	(1931–2020)	Astrophysicist	Invented ultraviolet camera/spectrograph, which was used by NASA when it launched Apollo 16 in 1972; in recognition of his contributions, the Carruthers Geocorona Observatory was named in his honor	
Carson, Ben	1951–	Pediatric neurosurgeon	Pediatric neurosurgery at Johns Hopkins University; first surgeon to successfully separate craniopagus twins	
Carver, George Washington	1865–1943	Botanical researcher	Discovered hundreds of uses for previously useless vegetables and fruits, principally the peanut	
Chandler, Edward Marion Augustus	1887–1973	Chemist	2nd African-American to obtain a PhD in chemistry in US and part of the founding faculty of Roosevelt College (now Roosevelt University)	
Chappelle, Charles W.	1872–1941	Electrician, construction, international businessman, and aviation pioneer	Designed long-distance flight airplane; the only African-American to invent and display the airplane at the 1911 First Industrial Air Show held in conjunction with the Auto Show at Grand Central Palace in Manhattan in New York City; president of the African Union Company, Inc.	
Chappelle, Emmett	1925–2019	Scientist and researcher	Inducted into the National Inventors Hall of Fame for his work on bioluminescence in 2007, and his work provided innovations and contributions to several fields: medicine, biology, food science, and astrochemistry	
Charles Orren Bailiff		Inventor	An African-American inventor known for developing a shampoo headrest in the late 19th century to improve the process of washing hair.	
Chin, Karen		Paleontologist	Considered one of the world's leading experts in coprolites	
Clark, Kenneth B.	1917–1983	Psychologist	First Black president of the American Psychological Association	
Clark, Mamie Phipps	1914–2005	Psychologist	Conducted 1940s experiments using dolls to study children's attitudes about race	
Collins, Margaret S.	1922–1996	Entomologist and zoologist	First African-American female entomologist and the third African-American female zoologist. Collins discovered a new species of termite called Neotermes luykxi, or the Florida damp wood termite, in 1989	
Cooke, Lloyd Miller	1916–2001	Researcher, industrial chemist	Specialized in cellulose and carbohydrate chemistry; awarded the William Procter Prize for Scientific Achievement (1971)	
Croak, Marian	1955-	Engineer	Engineer known for her Voice over IP (VoIP) related inventions. In 2022, she was inducted into the National Inventors Hall of Fame for her work with VoIP.	
Crosthwait, David Jr.	1892–1976	Research engineer	Heating, ventilation, and air conditioning; received 39 U.S. patents and 80 foreign patents relating to HVAC systems	
Curtis, James H. "Nick"	1935–	Researcher, chemist (electronics/specialty chemicals)	Organic ionogen for aluminum electrolytic capacitors, cationic dialdehyde polysaccharides for wet strength paper and others, US Patent Office US Pat #3609467 US Pat #3547423 and others	
Dabiri, John	1980–	Biophysicist	Expert on jellyfish hydrodynamics and designer of a vertical-axis wind farm adapted from schooling fish	
Daly, Marie Maynard	1921–2003	Biochemist	First Black American woman to earn a PhD in chemistry (Columbia University 1948)	
Davis, Chuck	? -2017	Inventor and electrical engineer	Inventor of the pROSHI neurofeedback device.	
Dean, Mark	1957–	Computer scientist	Led the team that developed the ISA bus, and led the design team responsible for creating the first one-gigahertz computer processor chip	
Drew, Charles	1904–1950	Medical researcher	Developed improved techniques for blood storage	
Easley, Annie	1933–2011	Computer scientist	Work at the Lewis Research Center of the National Aeronautics and Space Administration and its predecessor, the National Advisory Committee for Aeronautics	
Ellis, Clarence "Skip"	1943–2014	Computer scientist	First African-American with a PhD in computer science; software inventor including OfficeTalk at Xerox PARC	
Ezerioha, Bisi	1972–	Automotive engineer	Drag racing engineer and driver	
Ferguson, Lloyd Noel	1918–2011	Chemist, educator	Chemistry doctorate, first received (1943, University of California, Berkeley)	
Fitzhugh, Courtney		hematologist-oncologist and scientist	Clinical researcher and head of the laboratory of early sickle cell mortality prevention at the National Heart, Lung, and Blood Institute	
Fox, Brian J.	1959–	Computer scientist, programmer, technologist	Original author of bash, and developer of the first online banking website in the US.	
Fryer, Roland G. Jr.	1977–	Economist, social scientist, statistician	Professor of economics at Harvard University and the youngest African American to receive tenure at Harvard	
Gates, Sylvester James	1950–	Theoretical physicist	Work on supersymmetry, supergravity, and superstring theory	
Gilbert, Juan E.	1969–	Computer scientist	Awarded the first Presidential Endowed Chair at Clemson University in honor of his accomplishments	
Gipson, Mack	1931–1995	Geologist	First Black man to receive a Ph.D. in Geology (University of Chicago 1963)	
Golden, Sherita Hill		physician-scientist	Hugh P. McCormick Family Professor of Endocrinology and Metabolism at Johns Hopkins University and her research considers biological and systems influences on diabetes and its outcomes	
Goode, Sarah E.	1855–1905	Inventor	Folding "cabinet-bed", forerunner of the Murphy bed; first African-American woman to receive a patent in the United States	
Grant, Christine		Chemical engineer, professor	Associate Dean of Faculty Advancement at North Carolina State University. Her research considers surface and environmental science. Grant is the 2022 President of the American Institute of Chemical Engineers.	
Grant, George F.	1846–1910	Dentist, professor	The first African-American professor at Harvard, Boston dentist, and inventor of a wooden golf tee.	
Graves, Joseph L.	1955–	Evolutionary biologist	First African American to earn a Ph.D. in evolutionary biology	
Green, Lisa		Linguist	Specializes in syntax and the study of African-American English	
Greenaugh, Kevin	1956–2023	Nuclear engineer	Senior manager at the National Nuclear Security Administration (NNSA) in Washington, D.C. and involved in nuclear deterrent research and development	
Griffin, Bessie Blount	1914–2009	Physical therapist, inventor	Amputee self-feeding device	
Hall, Cynthia	1922/3–????	Nuclear scientist	Worked on the Manhattan Project at the Argonne National Laboratory, where she was one of the few female African-American scientists assigned	
Hall, Gregory		Physician	An internal medicine physician at University Hospitals in Ohio. Founded the National Institute for African American Health (NIAAH) and launched a multivitamin for African-Americans, GNetX Sequence. Notably, he authored Patient-Centered Clinical Care for African Americans: A Concise, Evidence-Based Guide to Important Differences and Better Outcomes (2020) which is the first book to broadly address best practices in the clinical care of African Americans.	
Hall, Lloyd	1894–1971	Chemist, inventor	Inducted into the National Inventors Hall of Fame for his more than 100 U.S. and foreign patents associated with preserving food	
Harewood, Ken R.		Molecular biologist	GlaxoSmithKline Distinguished Professor and Director of the North Carolina Central University (NCCU) Julius L. Chambers Biomedical/Biotechnology Research institute and recognized for his work in the fields of cancer biology and cancer drug discovery.	
Harper, Solomon	1895–1980	Inventor	Invented first electrically heated hair roller and 28 other inventions	
Harris, Betty	1940-	Chemist	At Los Alamos National Laboratory, developed a spot test for identifying explosives in a field environment in which she received a patent in 1986	
Harris, James A.	1932–2000	Radiochemist	Co-discovered Rutherfordium (element 104) and Dubnium (element 105) at Lawrence Livermore Laboratory	
Hawkins, Walter Lincoln	1911–1992	Scientist	Inventor at Bell Laboratories	
Hodge, John E.	1914–1996	Chemist	In 1973 published the mechanism for the Maillard reaction pathway	
Holley, Kerrie	1954–	Computer scientist	IBM's 1st black Distinguished Engineer and 2nd black IBM Fellow. Inventor of several software engineering techniques including system and methods for locating mobile devices using location and presence information	
Houze Jr., John	1934–	Entrepreneur, Inventor	Inventor of the retractable golf cart canopy to cover the rear area of the cart that is usually exposed.	
Ideraabdullah, Folami		Geneticist	Determined that maternal Vitamin D deficiencies can cause genome-wide changes in methylation patterns that persist for several generations and impact offspring health	
Imes, Elmer	1883–1941	Physicist	Second African-American to earn a Ph.D. in physics who demonstrated for the first time that quantum theory could be applied to the rotational energy states of molecules, as well as the vibration and electronic levels	
Jackson, John W. Jr.	1953–2007	Electrical engineer, inventor, 400 metres top sprinter	Co-inventor of imaging x-ray spectrometer. NASA engineer. United States of America Army Civilian Engineer.	
Jackson, Joseph N.	1937–2025	Innovator and inventor	Inventor of the programmable TV remote control	
Jackson, Mary	1921–2005	Mathematician, Aerospace engineer	NASA's first Black female engineer	
Jackson, Shirley	1946–	Physicist	Distinguished and pioneering scientific career, achieving several "firsts" as a woman and as an African-American	
Jackson, William	1936–	Laser chemist/photochemist, cometary astrochemist at Howard University and UC Davis	Research to unravel the key photochemical sinks of important molecules in planetary atmospheres, in our and other solar systems, around stars, and the interstellar medium.	
Jarvis, Erich	1965–	Neurobiologist	Duke University neuroscience bird songs studies	
Jeff, Janina	1985–	Geneticist	First African American to graduate with a Ph.D. in human genetics from Vanderbilt University	
Jefferson, Roland	1923–2020	Botanist	First African-American botanist to work at the United States National Arboretum; played important role in the preservation of Washington, D.C.'s famous flowering cherry trees.	
Jennings, Thomas L.	1791–1856	Inventor	First African-American to be granted a patent (for a dry cleaning process called dry scouring)	
Johnson, Isaac	18xx– ?	Inventor	Held patent for improvements to the bicycle frame, specifically so it could be taken apart for compact storage	
Johnson, Katherine	1918–2020	Physicist, mathematician	Made contributions to the United States' aeronautics and space programs with the early application of digital electronic computers at NASA	
Johnson, Lonnie	1949–	Mechanical engineer, nuclear engineer, inventor	Invented Super Soaker while researching thermal energy transfer engines; worked with NASA; holder of over 80 patents	
Jones, Frederick McKinley	1893–1961	Inventor	Invented refrigerated truck systems	
Julian, Percy	1899–1975	Chemist	First to synthesize the natural product physostigmine; earned 130 chemical patents; lauded for humanitarian achievements	
Just, Ernest	1883–1941	Woods Hole Marine Biology Institute biologist	Provided basic and initial descriptions of the structure–function–property relationship of the plasma membrane of biological cells	
Kenner, Mary	1912–2006	Inventor	Developed the adjustable sanitary belt and a bathroom tissue dispenser; awarded five patents	
Kittles, Rick	1967–	Geneticist	Work in tracing the ancestry of African-Americans via DNA testing	
Kountz, Samuel L.	1930–1981	Transplant surgeon, researcher	Organ transplantation pioneer, particularly renal transplant research and surgery; author or co-author of 172 articles in scientific publications	
Land, Adrian		Microbiologist	Researcher on Streptococcus pneumoniae and Staphylococcus aureus	
Latimer, Lewis	1848–1928	Inventor, draftsman, expert witness	Worked as a draftsman for both Alexander Graham Bell and Thomas Edison; invented the more durable filament, which made the incandescent light bulb last long enough to be useful; became a member of Edison's Pioneers and served as an expert witness in many light bulb litigation lawsuits; said to have invented the water closet.	
Lawson, Jerry	1940–2011	Computer engineer	Designer of Fairchild Channel F, the first programmable ROM cartridge-based video game console	
Lee, Joseph	1849–1908	entrepreneur, chef and inventor	Invented machines for bread	
Lee, Raphael Carl	1949–	Surgeon, biomedical engineer	Professor at Pritzker School of Medicine; discovered ways to improve injury repair mechanisms of living cells; holds patents related to scar treatment therapies, tissue engineered ligaments, brain trauma therapies, and protective garments	
Lynk, Beebe Steven	1872–1948	Chemist	Teacher at West Tennessee University	
Mahoney, Mary	1845–1926	Nurse	First African-American to study and work as a professionally trained nurse in the United States	
Martin, Thomas J.	1842–1872	Inventor	Awarded a patent in 1872 for improvements to the fire extinguisher	
Massie, Samuel P.	1919–2005	chemist	One of the African American scientists and technicians on the Manhattan Project to develop atomic bombs in World War II; Massie worked with uranium isotopes	
Matthews, Jessica O.	1988-	Inventor and venture capitalist	Co-founder of Uncharted, which made Soccket, a soccer ball that can be used as a portable power generator	
McBay, Henry	1914–1995	Chemist	His discoveries allowed chemists around the world to create inexpensive peroxide compounds	
McCaskill-Stevens, Worta	1949–2023	Physician-scientist and oncologist	Specialized in cancer disparities research, management of comorbidities within clinical trials, and molecular research for cancer prevention interventions	
McCoy, Elijah	1844–1929	Inventor	Invented the automatic lubricator for steam engines, McCoy learned a great deal of his skills from a mechanical apprenticeship when he was age fifteen.	
McKinney, Rosco Lewis	1900–1978	Anatomist	In 1930 first African American to earn a Ph.D. in anatomy.	
McLurkin, James	1972–	Roboticist and Inventor	Inventor of the world's smallest self-contained autonomous robots measuring a little over one inch on a side	
McNair, Ronald	1950–1986	Astronaut and Physicist	Employed by Hughes Research Laboratories as a research scientist and specialized in chemical and high-pressure laser physics prior to becoming an astronaut	
McWhorter, John	1965–	Linguist	Specializes in the study of creole language formation	
Mensah, Thomas	1950–2024	Inventor		
Miles, Alexander	1838–1918	Inventor	Invented electric elevator doors that automatically open and close	
Montgomery, Benjamin	1819–1877	Inventor	Designed a steam operated propeller to provide propulsion to boats in shallow water	
Moore, Willie Hobbs	1934–1994	Physicist	First African-American woman to earn a PhD in physics (University of Michigan Ann Arbor 1972) on vibrational analysis of secondary chlorides	
Morgan, Garrett	1877–1963	Inventor	Invented an early version of a gas mask called a smoke hood, and created the first traffic light that included a third "warning" position which is standard today. Morgan also developed a chemical that was used in hair products for hair-straightening.	
Newman, Lyda D.	1885-	Inventor	Patented novel durable hairbrush with synthetic bristles which is still used today.	
Nriagu, Jerome	1944–	Geochemist	Studies toxic metals in the environment; supporter of the lead poisoning thesis of the decline of the Roman Empire	
Owens, Ida Stephens	1939–2020	Physiology and Biochemistry	Researched drug-detoxifying enzymes. One of the first two African Americans to receive a doctorate from Duke University.	
Parker, Alice H.	1895–1920	Inventor	Furnace for Central Heating	
Petters, Arlie	1964–	Physicist	Work on the mathematical physics of gravitational lensing	
Poindexter, Hildrus	1901–1987	Bacteriologist, epidemiologist	Work on the epidemiology of tropical diseases, including malaria	
Quarterman, Lloyd Albert	1918–1982	Scientist, fluoride chemist	Manhattan Project, worked with Albert Einstein and Enrico Fermi	
Reddick, Mary Logan	1914–1966	neuroembryologist, biologist	Possibly the first African-American woman scientist to receive a fellowship to study abroad, and the first female biology instructor at Morehouse College.	
Reed, Judy W.	c. 1826 – c. 1905	Unknown	Considered the first African-American woman to receive a US patent. Patent No. 305,474 for a "Dough Kneader and Roller" was granted September 23, 1884. The patent was for an improved design of existing rollers with dough mixing more evenly while being kept covered and protected.	
Renfroe, Earl	1907–2000	Orthodontist		
Rillieux, Norbert	1806–1894	Engineer, inventor	Inventor of the multiple-effect evaporator	
Roberts, Louis W.	1913–1995	Microwave physicist	Among the highest ranking African-American space program staff at NASA while the Apollo program was underway.	
Robinson, Larry	1957–	Environmental chemist	Investigated possible role of arsenic in the death of Zachary Taylor; interim president of Florida A&M University	
Ross, Archia	Turn of 20th century	Inventor	A runner for stoops (1896), bag closure device (1898), a wrinkle-preventing trouser stretcher (1899), a garment-hanger (1903), and a holder for brooms and like articles.	
Russell, Jesse	1948–	Engineer, inventor	Wireless communications engineer	
Ruth, William Chester	1882–1971	Inventor, machinist	Combination baler feeder, self-lifting farm elevator	
Sammons, Walter	1890–1973	Inventor	Patent for hot comb	
Snyder, Window	1976–	Computer engineer	Security engineer at Microsoft, Mozilla, and Apple	
Sowell, Thomas	1930–	Economist, social scientist	Economist, social theorist and political philosopher	
Steele, Claude	1946–	Psychologist, social scientist	Stereotype threat studies	
Stiff, Lee	1941–	Mathematician	President of the National Council of Teachers of Mathematics from 2000 to 2002	
Temple, Lewis	1800–1854	Inventor, blacksmith, abolitionist	Inventor of the toggling whaling harpoon head	
Thomas, Valerie	1943–	Data analyst and inventor	Invented the illusion transmitter	
Thomas, Vivien	1910–1985	Surgical technician	Blue baby syndrome treatment in the 1940s	
Turner, Charles Henry	1867–1923	Zoologist	First person to prove that insects can hear and can distinguish pitch, that cockroaches can learn by trial and error, and that honeybees can see color; first African-American to receive a PhD from the University of Chicago	
Tyree, G. Bernadette	19xx–	Biochemist	Program Director, Division of Musculoskeletal Diseases, at National Institute of Arthritis and Musculoskeletal and Skin Diseases, National Institutes of Health	
Tyson, Neil deGrasse	1958–	Astronomer	Researcher and popular educator in astronomy and the sciences	
Valerino, Powtawche	1980–	Engineer	Worked for JPL and NASA at Langley Research Center	
Vaughan, Dorothy	1910–2008	Mathematician	Worked for NACA and NASA at Langley Research Center	
Walker, Arthur B. C. Jr.	1936–2001	Astronomer	Developed normal incidence multilayer XUV telescopes to photograph the solar corona	
Walker, C. J.	1867–1919	Inventor	Created black cosmetic products	
Ward, Dawn N.	1973–	Organic chemistry	Creates compounds to treat Hepatitis C	
Washington, Warren M.	1936–	Atmospheric scientist	Former chair of the National Science Board	
West, James E.	1931–	Acoustician, inventor	Co-developed the foil electret microphone	
White, Lisa		Paleontologist	Geologist and Director of Education and Outreach at the University of California Museum of Paleontology	
Wilkins, J. Ernest Jr.	1923–2011	Mathematician, engineer, nuclear scientist	Entered University of Chicago at age 13; PhD at 19; worked on the Manhattan Project; wrote more than 100 scientific papers; helped recruit minorities into the sciences	
Williams, Daniel	1856–1931	Surgeon	The first black person on record to have successfully performed pericardium (the sac surrounding the heart) surgery to repair a wound.	
Williams, Marguerite Thomas	1895–1991	Geologist	First black person to receive a Ph.D. in Geology	
Williams, Scott W.	1943–	Mathematician		
Williams, Walter E.	1936–2020	Economist, social scientist		
Winkfield, Karen	1970-	radiation oncologist, physician-scientist, and implementation scientist	Ingram Professor of Cancer Research at Vanderbilt University School of Medicine and in 2021, appointed by U.S. president Joe Biden to a six-year term on the National Cancer Advisory Board.	
Woods, Granville	1856–1910	Inventor	Invented the synchronous multiplex railway telegraph	
Wright, Jane C.	1919–2013	Cancer research and surgeon	Noted for her contributions to chemotherapy and for pioneering the use of the drug methotrexate to treat breast cancer and skin cancer	
Wright, Louis T.	1891–1952	Surgeon	Led team that first used Aureomycin as a treatment on humans	
Yaeger, Ivan	1967–	Inventor	Inventor of the Yaeger Prosthetic Arm	
Young, Roger Arliner	1899–1964	Zoologist	First African-American woman to receive a doctorate degree in zoology	

== See also ==
- Lists of African Americans
- List of inventors
- History of United States patent law
- Lemelson–MIT Prize
- NASA spinoff
- National Inventors Hall of Fame
- Science and technology in the United States
- Technological and industrial history of the United States
- Timeline of United States discoveries
- Timeline of United States inventions
- United States patent law
- United States Patent and Trademark Office
- Yankee ingenuity
- African-American women in computer science
- African-American women in medicine
- List of African-American women in STEM fields
- List of African-American mathematicians
- List of African scientists, inventors, and scholars
- African-American dance
- Asian Americans in science and technology
