= Mason Pearson Brushes =

British hairbrush manufacturer

Mason Pearson Brushes is a British company specialising in the manufacture of hairbrushes. In the mid-1860s a Yorkshireman called Mason Pearson came to work at the British Steam Brush Works, in the East End of London. In 1885 he invented the "pneumatic" rubber-cushion hairbrush which became the company's primary product and is still on sale, little changed from the original design. The "Junior" model, which has a mix of boar nylon bristles, has been called "the Ferrari of brushes".

Mason Pearson hairbrushes are sold worldwide. The family business is still passed down through generations and is currently run by the Pearson family in London.
