= Folami =

Folami is a given name and a surname. Notable people with the name include:

- Ben Folami (born 1999), Australian professional footballer
- Folami Ankoanda-Thompson, vocalist with the band Chic
- Folami Ideraabdullah, American geneticist
