= Thennamadevi =

Village in Tamil Nadu, India

Coordinates: 11°58′57″N 79°28′50″E

Thennamadevi or thennaven ma devi is a village in Tamil Nadu, India, not far from Viluppuram. In 2016, a group of teenaged women "took over" the village and enacted several civic improvements within two years.

The village is located among rice paddies, banana trees and sugar cane fields. There is a high level of alcoholism among men in this village, and it's been reported that most of the 150 men in the village engage in heavy drinking every day. The village has an extremely high percentage of widows and also high rates of human trafficking.

== Young girls' club ==
After a women's empowerment club called the "young girls' club" opened in Thennamadevi, approximately two dozen teenaged women decided to enact major changes in their village. Between 2016 and 2018, the group focused on making it safer for young people in the village to attend school. They installed street lights in the village's two unpaved streets, added a 150-book library and got local authorities to add a bus stop that goes into town. They convinced health officials to provide modern feminine sanitary products in the nearest clinic. They also started a campaign to install toilets in individual homes, to both prevent men from harassing women in the town's public toilet, and to address the health challenges associated with large public communal bathrooms. Club members have pledged to help girls who are married against their will before they are 18 (which is illegal in India, but not well enforced), and in meetings they teach each other about self-discipline, personal hygiene and menstrual issues. Kousalya Radakrishnan is the Thennamadevi girls club president and spokesperson, replacing the original president Says Sowmya.
