= Mary Kenner =

American inventor (1912–2006)

Mary Beatrice Davidson Kenner
- Born: May 17, 1912; Monroe, North Carolina, U.S.
- Died: January 13, 2006 (aged 93) Washington, D.C., U.S.
- Occupation: Florist
- Known for: singing, inventions
- Parent: Sidney Nathaniel Davidson
- Relatives: Mildred Davidson Austin Smith

Mary Beatrice Davidson Kenner (May 17, 1912 – January 13, 2006) was an African American inventor who created an adjustable sanitary belt. to keep menstrual pads securely in place. She has been granted five patents in between 1956 and 1987, one of the highest totals awarded to an African American female inventor. All of her inventions provided solutions to common household and personal care issues; including improving menstrual hygiene products.

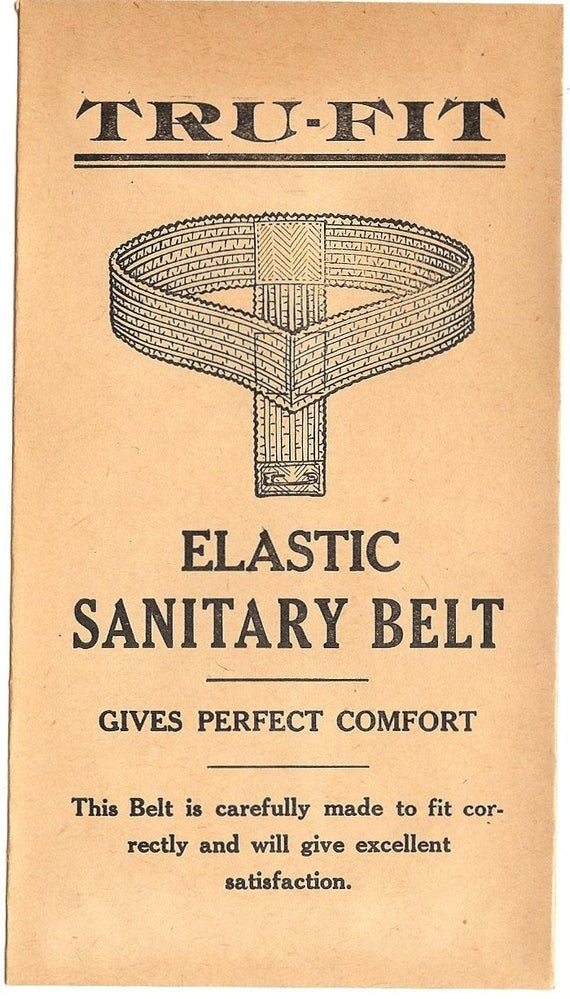
The Sanitary Belt

== Early life, Education, and Career ==
Kenner was born in Monroe, North Carolina. Her father, Sidney Nathaniel Davison, had patented a compact clothing presser in 1914. Her maternal grandfather, Robert Phromeberger, held patents for a tricolor light signals for trains and a wheeled ambulance stretcher. Her sister, Mildred Davidson Austin Smith would go on to hold a patent for a family board game in 1980. At age six Kenner tried to create a self oiling door hinge because every morning she heard the squeak of the front door. After moving to Washington, DC in 1924 Kenner became familiarized with the USPTO and the filing patent applications.

Kenner attended Dunbar High School in Washington, D.C. graduating in 1931. Kenner enrolled at Howard University however left after 18 months of schooling due to financial reasons. Kenner never earned a college degree nor formal education or training in her profession.

After leaving Howard University, Kenner worked various jobs before becoming unemployed by federal government during WWII. By 1950 Kenner became a professional florist and ran multiple flower shops in the Washington, D.C. area for around 20 years. During this time, she continued to develop new inventions.

== Inventions ==
Previous designs for managing menstruation included cloth pads and early disposable products. However, many of these designs lacked secure fasteners resulting in pad shifting and leakage. Disposable adhesive pads were not widely available until the 1970s. Initially, Kenner designed a sanitary belt in the 1920s however could not afford to apply for a patent. She filed for a patent in 1954 and it was approved in 1956. The device consisted of an adjustable waist band with straps attached to secure a sanitary pad to the user. This allowed users to move about while maintaining proper placement of the pad and lessened leakage and irritation caused by previous products. A subsequent revision modified the design to include a pocket resistant to moisture to minimize further leakage.

Sonn-Nap-Pack Co. contacted Kenner regarding potential licensing agreements for the sale of the product. When they learned that she was Black, they rescinded their offer. Kenner stated of the incident: "I was so jubilant... I saw houses, cars, and everything about to come my way. Sorry to say, when they found out I was Black, their interest dropped." Due to the fact that the patent expired and entered the public domain, Kenner lost all rights to profit off of the design.

In 1976, Kenner applied for and was granted a patent for an attachment to walkers and wheelchairs containing a hard surface tray and soft storage pocket. This invention was partially inspired by her sister Mildred being diagnosed with multiple scelerosis. Kenner co-patented a bathroom tissue holder with her sister in 1982. On September 29, 1987 Kenner was granted her last patent for a back washer that can be installed onto either a shower or bathtub wall.

== Legacy ==
Kenner's sanitary belt introduced adjustable securing mechanisms and moisture resistance into menstrual product design. The belt itself became obsolete following the widespread adoption of adhesive sanitary pads in the 1970s, however the core features it introduced; adjustability, secure pad placement, and moisture control were carried forward into modern menstrual products. Disposable pads with adhesive backing, which became the global standard for menstrual hygiene, reflect developments that Kenner's designs helped establish. Kenner received no formal awards or public recognition during her lifetime. She died on January 13, 2006 in Washington D.C. at the age of 93.

== See also ==
- List of African-American inventors and scientists
- Timeline of United States inventions
