= Alexander Miles =

African American govern

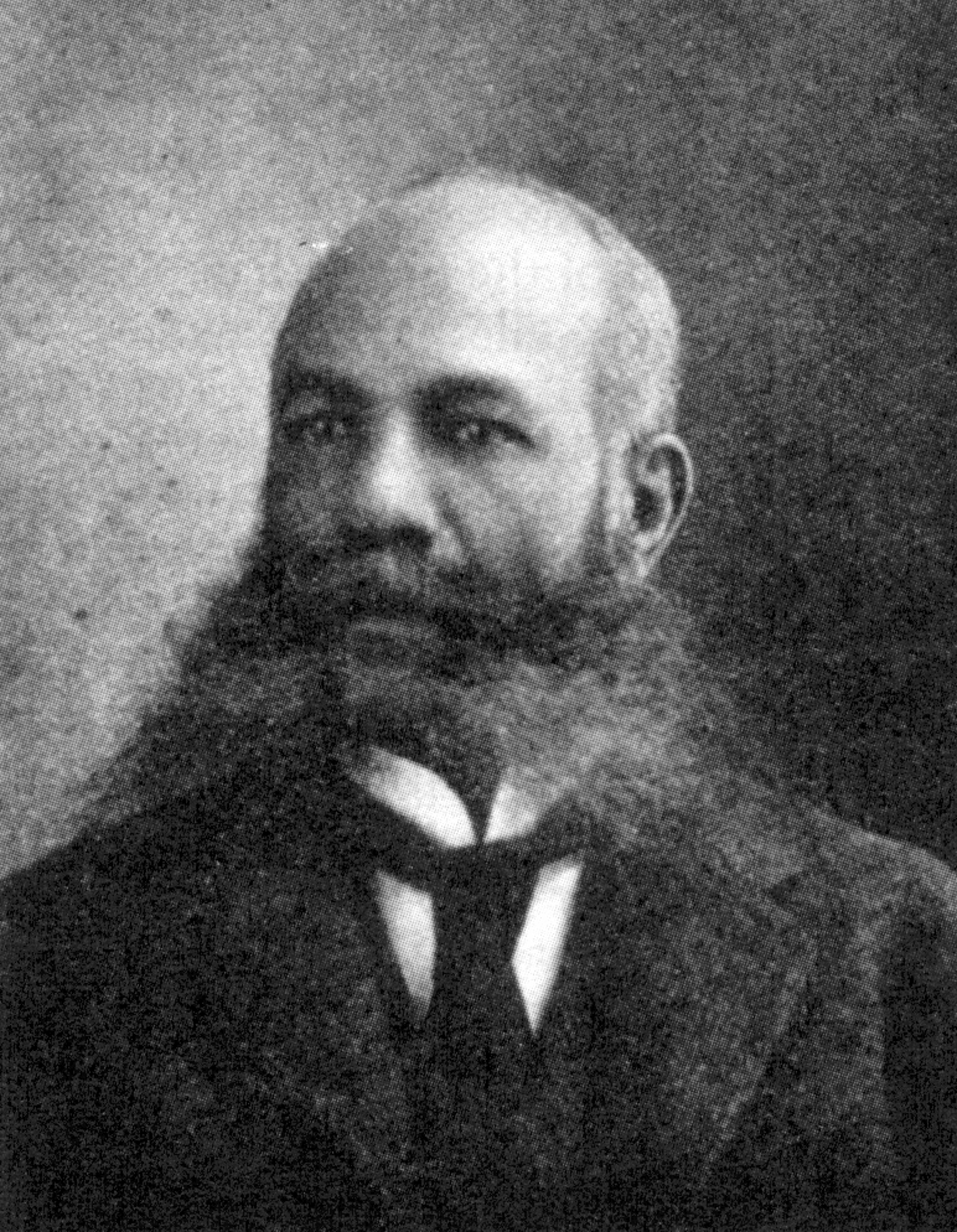
Alexander Miles, circa 1895

Alexander Miles (May 18, 1838 – May 7, 1918) was an African American inventor and businessman, known for being awarded a patent for automatically opening and closing elevator doors. He was awarded U.S. patent 371,207 on October 11, 1887.

== Biography ==
Alexander Miles was born on May 18, 1838 Pickaway County, Ohio, the son of Michael and Mary Miles. He was African-American. Miles may have resided in the nearby town of Chillicothe, Ohio, but subsequently moved to Waukesha, Wisconsin, where he earned a living as a barber. After a move to Winona, Minnesota, he met and married Mrs. Candace J. (Shedd) Dunlap, of La Porte, Indiana, a widow with two children, who was four years his senior and a native of New York. Together they had a daughter, born in 1876, named Grace. It is believed by some that Alexander got the idea for his elevator door mechanism after Grace accidentally fell down a shaft, almost ending her life. Shortly after her birth, the family relocated to Duluth, Minnesota. Here, Alexander became the first Black member of the Duluth Chamber of Commerce and operated a barber shop out of the St. Louis Hotel.

The family moved to Montgomery, Alabama by 1889, where Miles was listed in the city directories as a laborer. In 1899, he moved to Chicago where he founded The United Brotherhood as a life insurance company that would insure black people, who were often denied coverage at that time. Around 1903, they moved again, to Seattle, Washington, where he worked in a hotel as a barber.

Miles died in 1918, and was inducted into the National Inventors Hall of Fame in 2007.

== Elevator innovation ==
In this time, doors of the elevators had to be closed manually, often by dedicated operators. If the shaft was not closed, people could fall through it leading to some horrific accidents. Miles improved on this mechanism by designing a flexible belt attachment to the elevator cage, and drums positioned to indicate if the elevator has reached a floor. The belt allowed for automatic opening and closing when the elevator reached the drums on the respective floors, by means of levers and rollers.

Miles was granted a patent for this mechanism in 1887, thus greatly improving the safety and efficiency of elevators. John W. Meaker was granted a patent 13 years earlier for another related mechanism of automatic closing of elevator doors.

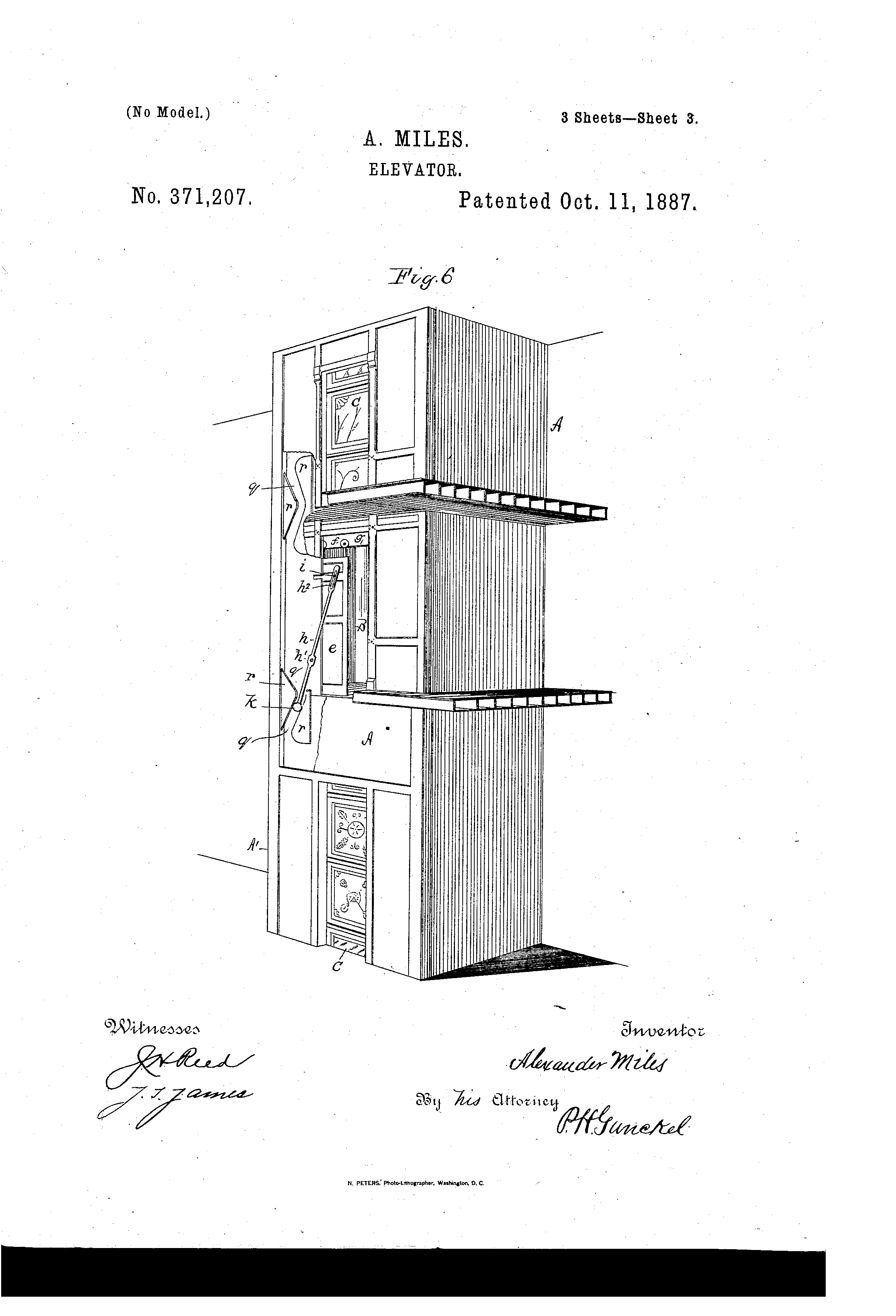

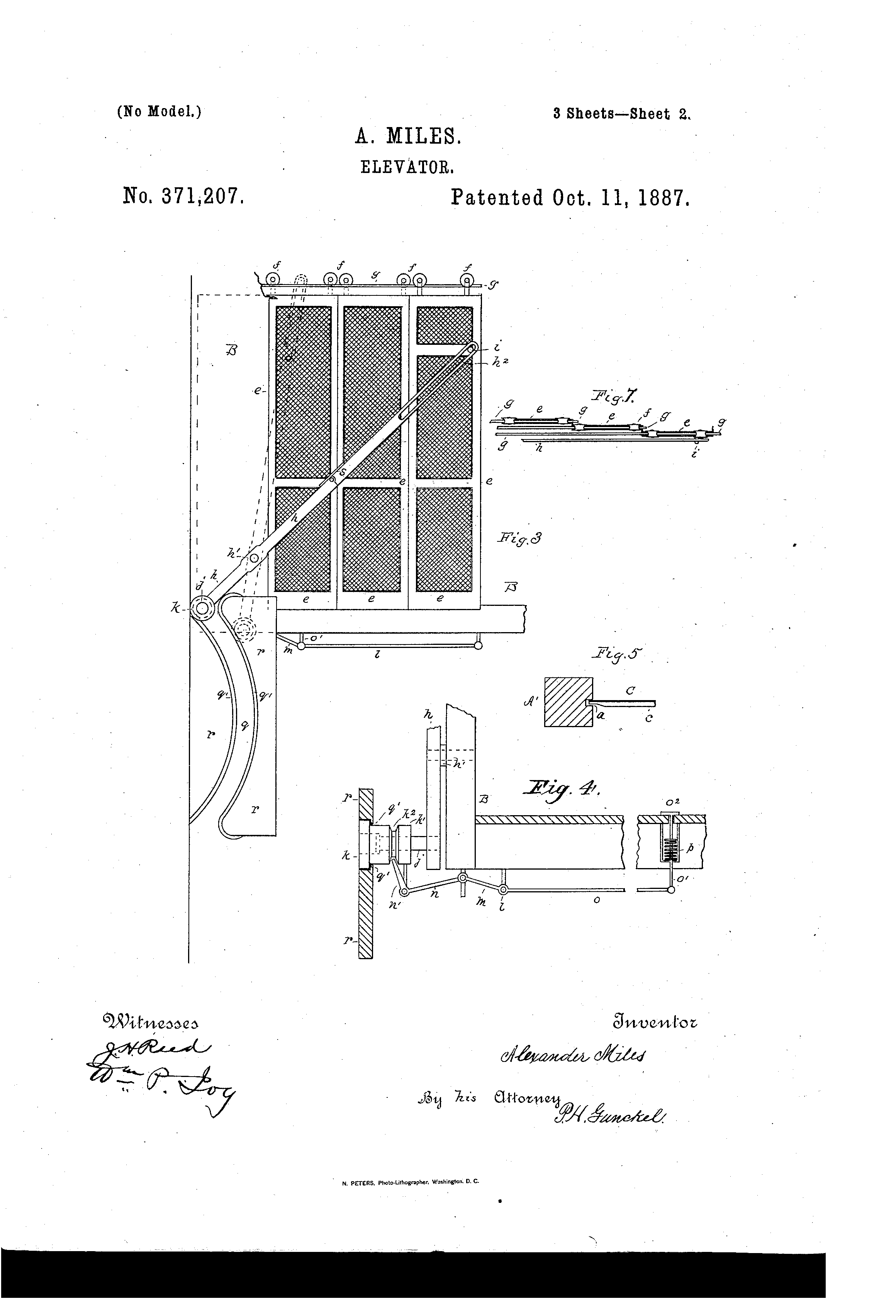

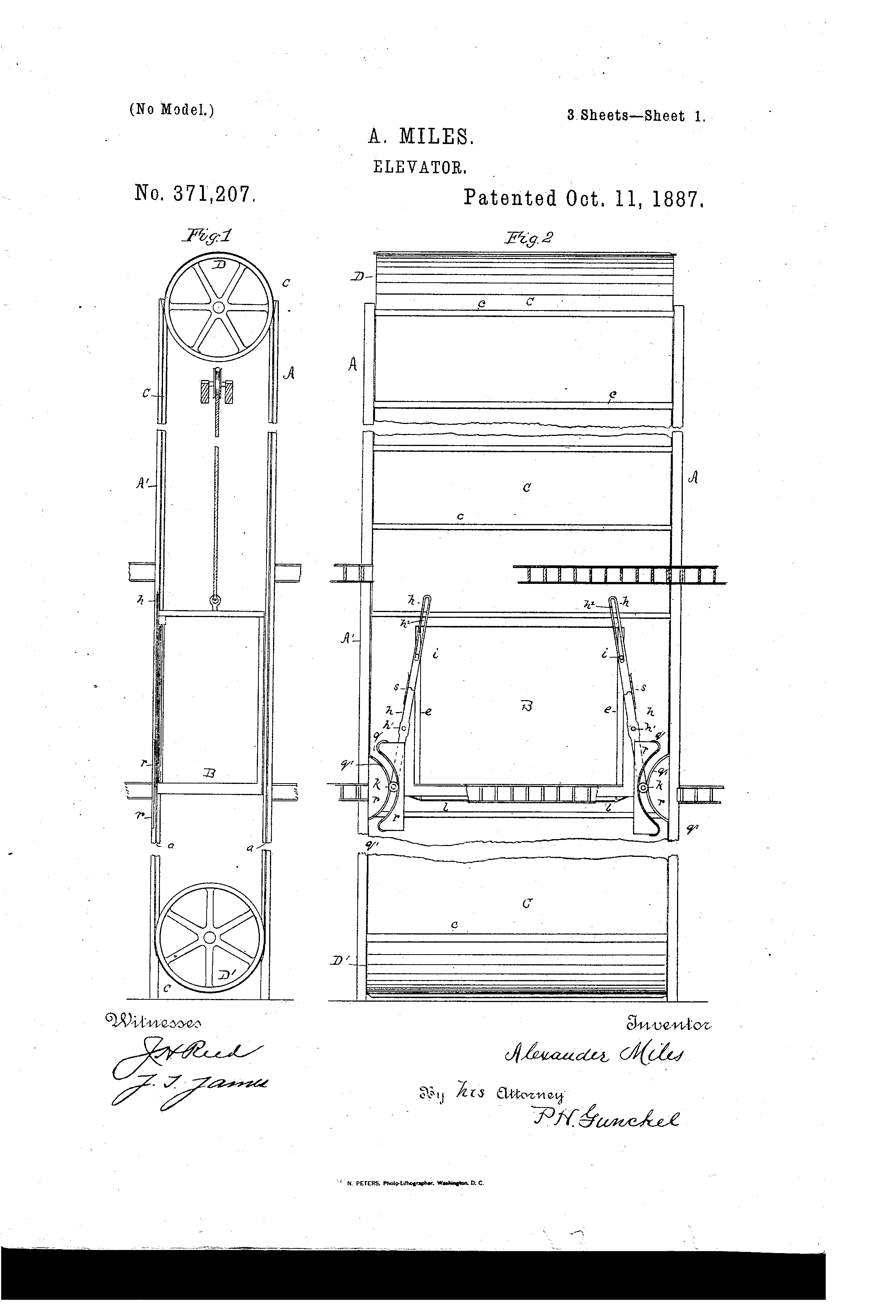

== See also ==
- List of African-American inventors and scientists
