= Ken R. Harewood =

American molecular biologist

Ken Harewood
- Born: Barbados
- Education: Lodge School, Barbados, New York University, City College of the City University of New York, New York Blood Center
- Occupation: scientist

Ken Harewood is a molecular biologist with a history of contributions to biomedical research.

Ken Harewood was formerly GlaxoSmithKline Distinguished Professor and Director of the North Carolina Central University (NCCU) Julius L. Chambers Biomedical/Biotechnology Research institute and is recognized for his work in the fields of cancer biology and cancer drug discovery. In 2008 he was appointed by Gov. Mike Easley to the N.C. Board of Science and Technology and served on the N.C. Biotechnology Center board of directors and is a member of the UNC Tomorrow Scholars' Council. Harewood has also served as Adjunct professor in the Department of Molecular Genetics and Microbiology at Duke University.

Harewood is a native of Barbados and received his secondary education there at the Lodge School. As a secondary student he excelled at soccer and became team captain of the Barbados National Soccer Team. Harewood came to the United States as an undergraduate to study biology at New York University. He then did graduate work at the City College of the City University of New York, where he earned his Master's and Doctoral degrees in Biochemistry. He next did post-doctoral research at the New York Blood Center.

After his training, Harewood accepted a laboratory position with Pfizer at its cancer research center in Maywood, New Jersey, later moving to Pfizer Central Research in Groton, Connecticut, where he founded the Department of Molecular Genetics and served as Project Leader and Principal Research Investigator. He and his team at Pfizer were the first to clone the gene for bovine calf rennin, leading to commercialization of the first food processing enzyme made using recombinant DNA technology. Harewood also contributed to discovery of the first human leukemia virus and HIV. His work on cancer resulted in novel cell-based methods for discovery of anti-cancer drugs.

Harewood has received a number of honors and awards, including: the Harlem YMCA Black Achievers in Industry Award, the National Consortium for Black Professional Development Health Sciences Award, the 1998 Barbados Charity Fund Pride and Industry Award, the 2006 North Carolina Central University Chancellor's Merit Award, the 2006 University of North Carolina Oliver Max Gardner Award; and the Barbados Barbados Gold Crown of Merit.

Harewood is author of Beyond My Wildest Dreams (Lulu.com, 2012, 350 pp.) and The Biotech Revolution: Impact on Science Education in America (Authorhouse, 2020, 112 pp.). Based on his experience with rennin Harewood co-authored an article for high school teachers describing lab exercises using this enzyme.
