= GNetX Sequence =

American vitamin brand

- Product type: Multivitamins
- Current owner: Vitacode, LLC
- Country: United States
- Introduced: 2020; 6 years ago
- Tagline: Precision multivitamins for African Americans
- Website: sequencemultivitamins.com

GNetX Sequence is an African American-owned, American vitamin brand founded in 2020 by Gregory Lafayette Hall. GNetX Sequence was launched operating as a brand of Vitacode, owned by Hall. As of November 2026, GNetX Sequence was manufacturing just two different types of multivitamins.

== History ==
Gregory Hall is an internal medicine physician at University Hospitals. In 2020, Hall founded Vitacode, LLC, or just known as Vitacode. The first offering by Hall was the Sequence Multivitamins, later known as GNet Sequence multivitamins, and now the current name of GNetX Sequence multivitamins inspired by the idea that he could create products to improve African American health. GNetX Sequence multivitamins launched with four initial formulas: "African American Men", "African American Women", "African American Men over 50" and "African American Women over 50". Each formulas was tailored to the minority and/or the appropriate age vitamin needs.

Per Hall vitamin E and selenium could increase the risk of lung cancer or prostate cancer, which are particular challenges of his target demographic. Thus, the multivitamin is notably absent in aforementioned vitamins. The multivitamin was developed with a specific focus on the appropriate amounts of the vitamins and minerals that African Americans need, such as vitamin D, vitamin C, magnesium, and potassium.

== Better Black Health Research ==
The GNetX Sequence multivitamin was tailored to the published research, like Better Black Health chapter "Understanding Black Health Disparities", specific to African American health to maximize the benefit while minimizing any risk.

== Works cited ==
Hall, MD, Gregory L. (September 15, 2025). Better Black Health: A Comprehensive Guide in the Age of Precision Medicine. Bloomington, IN: Archway Publishing. ISBN 9781665781015.
