= Menstrual pad =

Absorbent item worn in the underwear

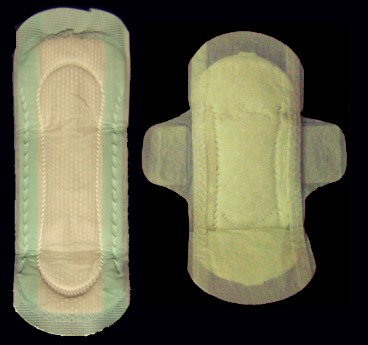
(left) pantyliner (right) Menstrual pad

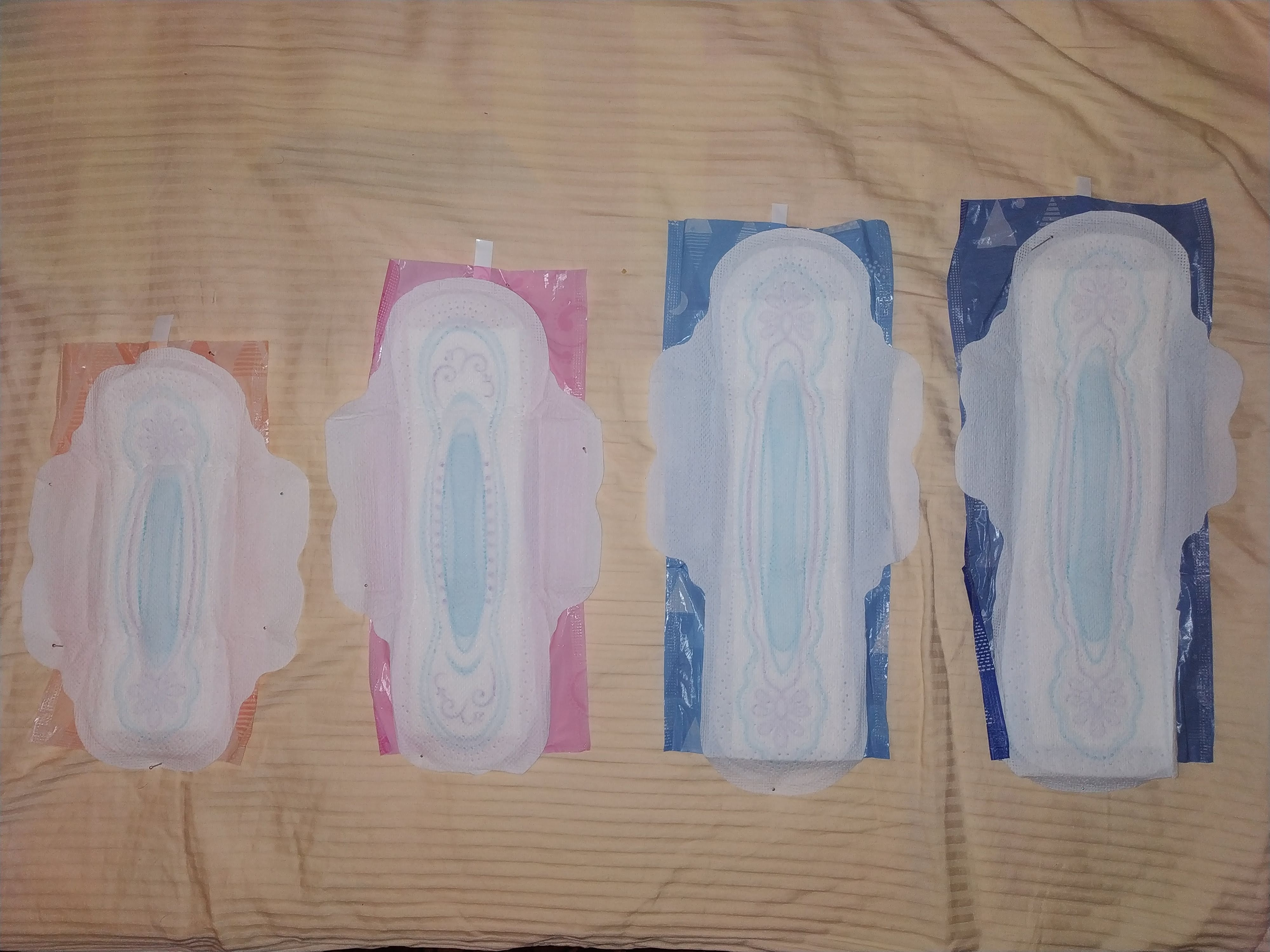
Different sized maxipads

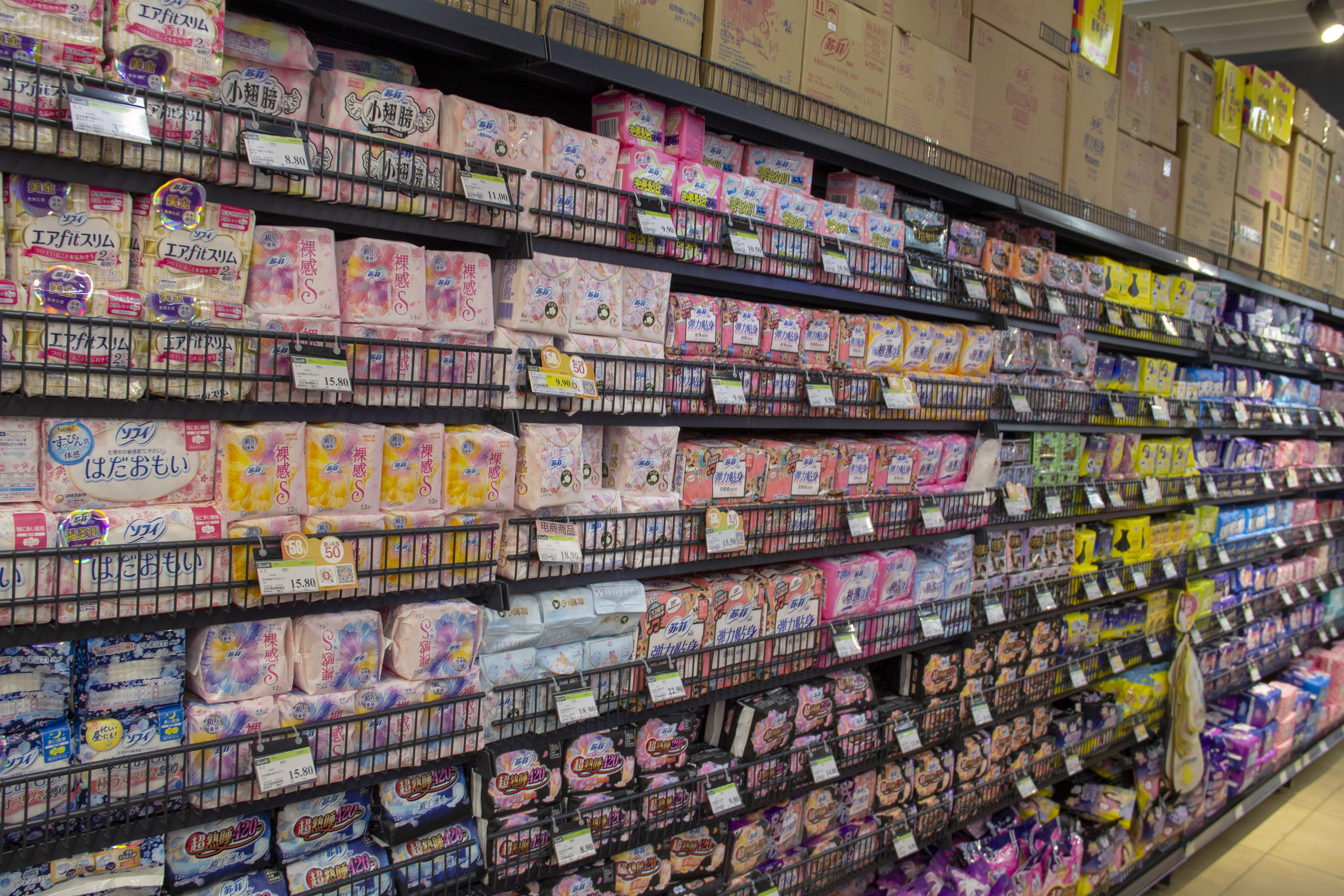
Different brands on a shelf in a Japanese-themed store aisle in China.

A menstrual pad (Note: Also known as a sanitary pad, sanitary towel, feminine pad, sanitary napkin, feminine napkin, or simply a pad.) is an absorbent item worn in the underwear when menstruating, bleeding after giving birth, recovering from gynecologic surgery, experiencing a miscarriage or abortion, or in any other situation where it is necessary to absorb a flow of blood from the vagina. A menstrual pad is a type of menstrual hygiene product that is worn externally, unlike tampons and menstrual cups, which are worn inside the vagina. Pads are generally changed by being stripped off the pants and panties, taking out the old pad, sticking the new one on the inside of the panties and pulling them back on. Pads are recommended to be changed every 3–4 hours to avoid certain bacteria that can fester in blood; this time also may differ depending on the kind worn, flow, and the time it is worn.

Menstrual pads are made from a range of materials, differing depending on style, country of origin, and brand. The pads are not the same as incontinence pads, which generally have higher absorbency and are worn by those who have urinary incontinence problems. Although menstrual pads are not made for this use, some use them for this purpose.

== Types ==
=== Disposable ===
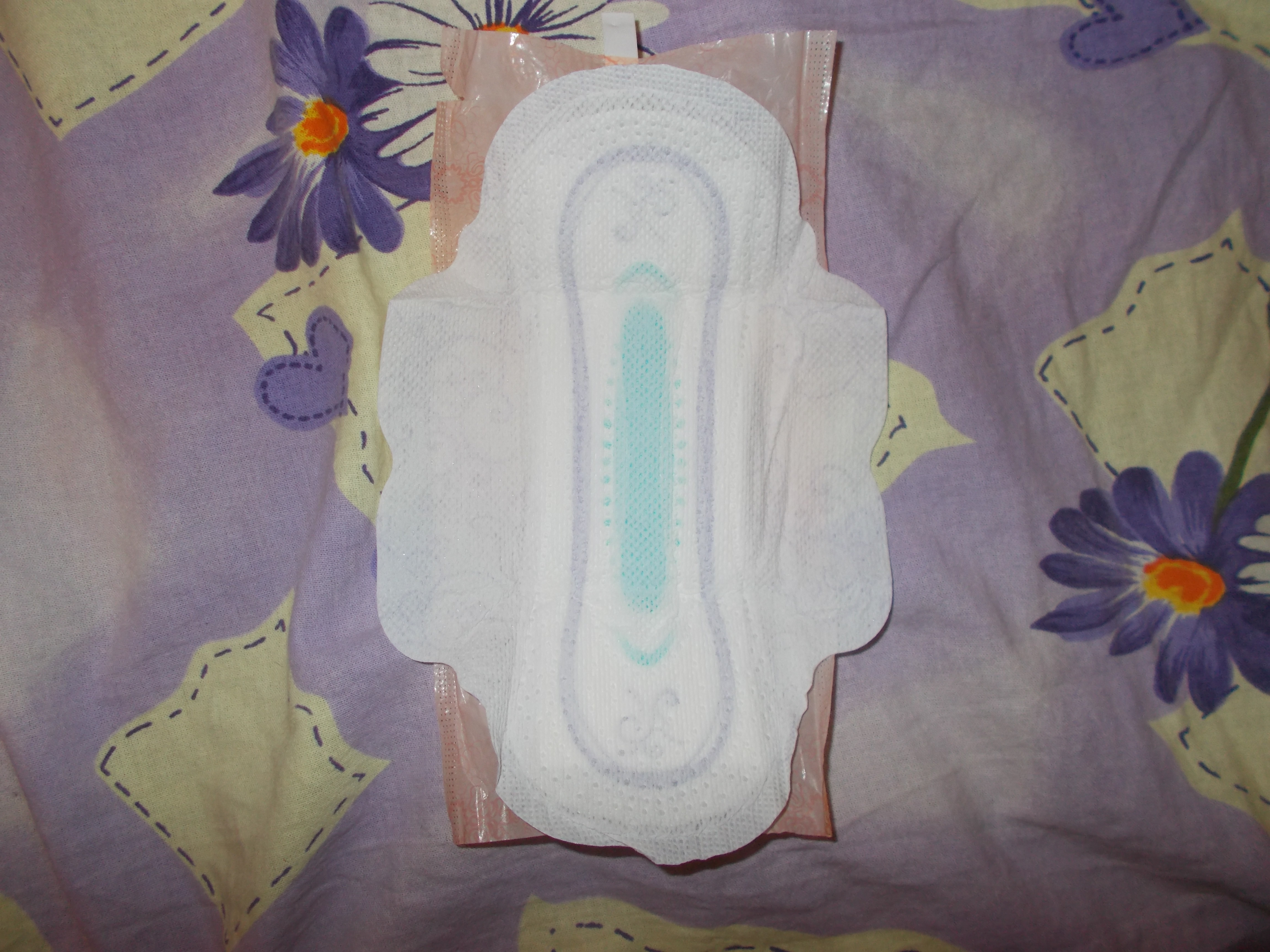
Platinum maxipad

Although producers are generally reluctant to reveal the exact composition of their products, the main materials of disposable menstrual pads are usually bleached rayon (cellulose made from wood pulp), cotton and plastics. In addition, fragrance and antibacterial agents can be included. The plastic parts are the backsheet and polymer powder as an additional powerful absorbent (superabsorbent polymers) that turns into a gel when moistened. Procter & Gamble advertise a proprietary material called Infinicel as the core of their napkins. In general, the layering is as follows: "an absorbent core material placed between a flexible liquid-pervious topsheet and a liquid-impervious plastic backsheet that has an adhesive on the outside for attaching the napkin to an undergarment". As is the case with disposable tampons and diapers, recycling is difficult and rarely done due to cost reasons, although proof-of-principle solutions appear to exist. When not dumped in a landfill where the non-biodegradable parts may persist for thousands of years, conventional hygiene products can at best be "thermally recycled" (incinerated).

There are several different types of disposable menstrual pads:

- Panty liner: Designed to absorb daily vaginal discharge, light menstrual flow, spotting, slight urinary incontinence, or as a backup for tampon or menstrual cup use.
- Ultra-thin: A very compact pad which may be as absorbent as a Regular or Maxi/Super pad but with less bulk.
- Regular: A middle range absorbency pad.
- Maxi/Super: A larger absorbency pad, useful for the start of the menstrual cycle, when menstruation is often heaviest.
- Overnight: A longer pad to allow for more protection while the wearer is lying down, with an absorbency suitable for overnight use.
- Maternity: A pad that is usually slightly longer than a maxi/Super pad, is designed to be worn to absorb lochia (bleeding that occurs after childbirth), and also is able to absorb urine.

The shape, absorbency and lengths may vary depending on manufacturer, but usually range from the short slender panty liner to the larger and longer overnight. Long pads are offered for extra protection, for heavy flows and/or overnight use.

Pads often include wings that wrap around the sides of underwear to add additional leak protection and help secure the pad in place. Some pads are scented to hide menstrual odour, but these scents can irritate the skin of the vulva. There are panty liners specifically designed to be worn with a thong/G-string.

=== Reusable (cloth) ===
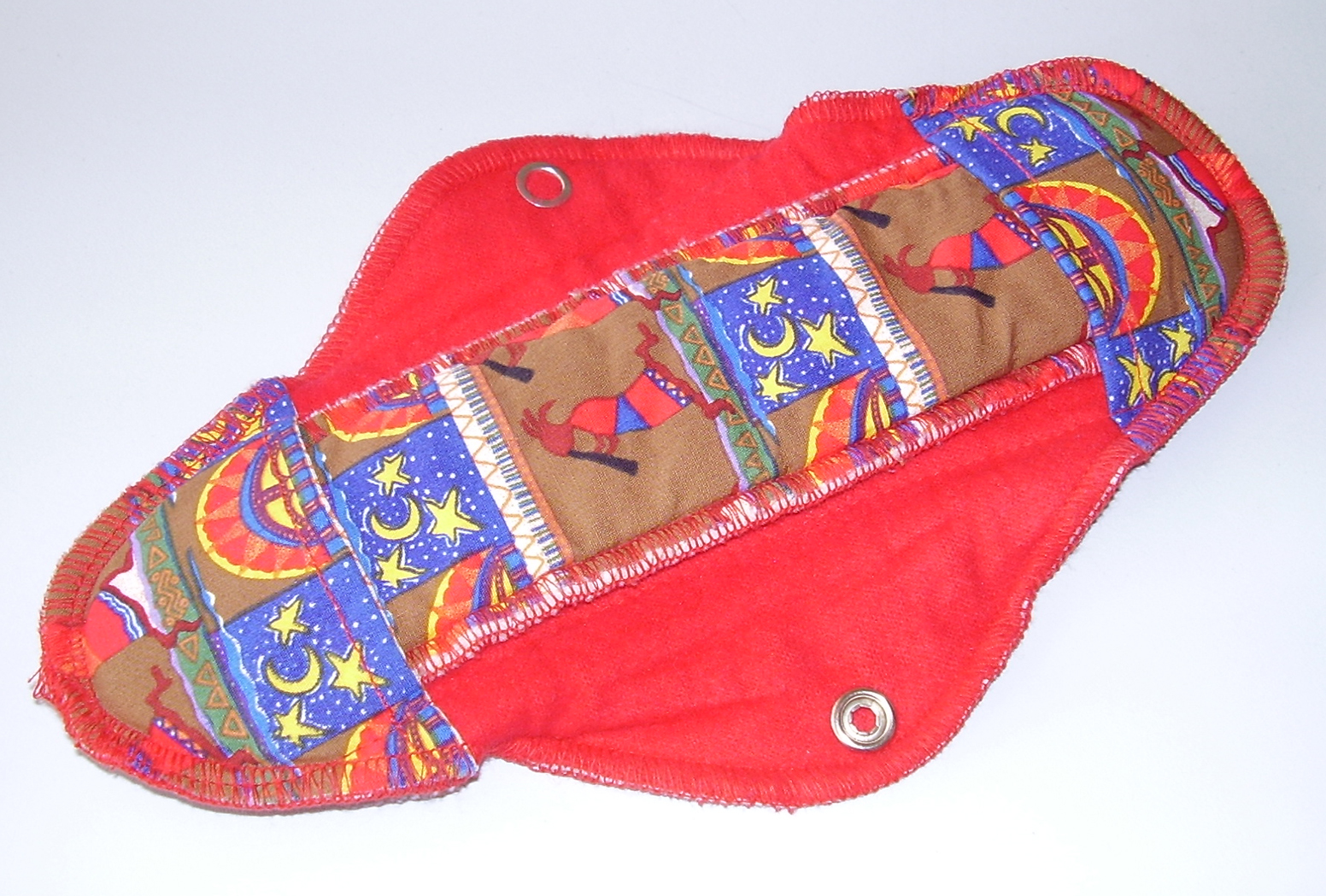
Reusable cloth menstrual pad with Kokopelli motif

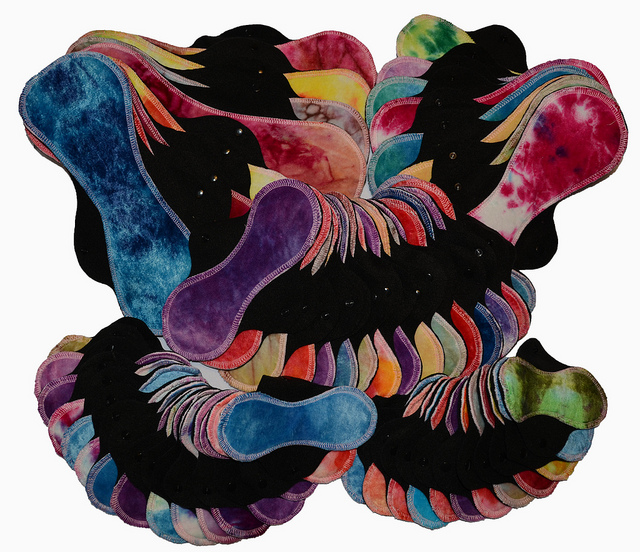
Modern reusable cloth pads in differing sizes

Some women use a washable or reusable cloth menstrual pad. These are made from a number of types of fabric—most often cotton flannel, bamboo, or hemp (which is highly absorbent and not as bulky as cotton). Most styles have wings that secure around the underpants, but some are just held in place (without wings) between the body and the underpants. Some (particularly the older styles) are available in belted styles. Cloth menstrual pads made a comeback around the 1970s, with their popularity increasing in the late 1980s and early 1990s. Reasons women choose to switch to cloth menstrual pads include comfort, savings over time, environmental impact, and health reasons.

Washable menstrual pads do not need to be disposed of after use and therefore offer a more economical alternative. Reusable menstrual pads can be found on a number of websites, or are made at home (instructions are available online). They have become a popular alternative because they are allergen- and perfume-free, and can be more comfortable for women who experience irritation from using disposable pads.

There are many styles of cloth menstrual pads available, ranging from panty liners to overnight pads. Popular styles of cloth menstrual pads include all-in-one, or AIO pads, in which the absorbent layer is sewn inside the pad, "inserts on top" style pads, which have absorbent layers that can be secured on top of the pad as needed, envelope or pocket style pads, which have absorbent layers that can be inserted inside the pad as needed, and a foldable style, in which the pad folds around the absorbent layers. Cloth menstrual pads can also have a waterproof lining, which provides more leak protection but may also be less breathable than those with no lining.

== Uses ==
Menstrual pads are worn to absorb menstrual discharge, thereby protecting clothing and furnishings. They are usually individually wrapped so they are easier and more discreet to carry in a purse or bag. This wrapper may be used to wrap the used pads before disposing of them in appropriate receptacles. Some women prefer to wrap the pads with toilet paper instead of (or as well as) using the wrapper, which, often being made of slick plastic with a small tape tab, may not adequately stick. Menstrual pads of any type should not be flushed down the toilet as they can cause blockages. Public toilets usually include a receptacle in which to place soiled pads. In first aid, they make excellent dressings for heavy bleeding due to their high absorbency if gauze is unavailable or inadequate.

Many women who experience urinary incontinence use menstrual pads to manage bladder leaks. However, since menstrual pads are designed to absorb menstrual flow, they are not as effective in absorbing urinary leaks; incontinence pads are designed for this purpose.

If someone does not have menstrual pads on hand while menstruating, they might use toilet paper as a temporary substitution.

== History ==
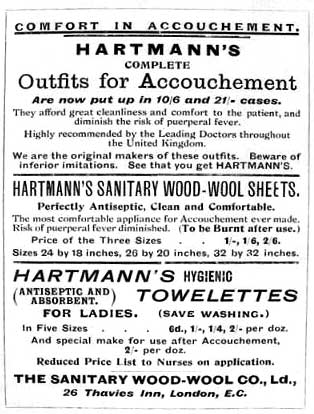
An advertisement poster for Hartmann's pads, dated circa 1900. "Accouchement" means childbirth, and "puerperal fever" is a postpartum infection.

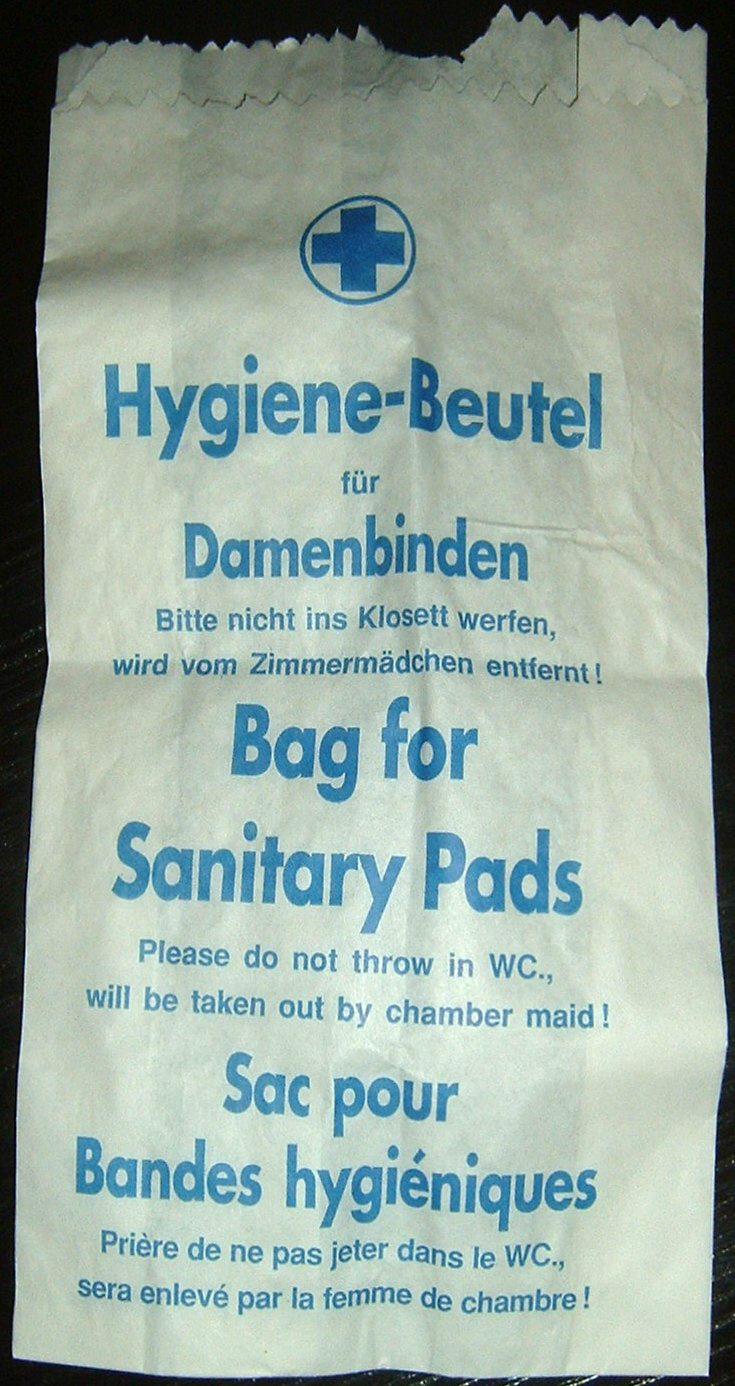
Bag for pads

Through the ages societies have used different forms of menstrual protection. Menstrual pads have been mentioned as early as the 10th century, in the Suda, where Hypatia, who lived in the 4th century AD, was said to have thrown one of her used menstrual rags at an admirer in an attempt to discourage him. In ancient Egypt, women used softened papyrus, a grass-like plant, to absorb their menstrual blood. Before commercially available menstrual hygiene products, most women used pieces of cloth to absorb their menstrual flow. "On the rag" is a term that originally referred to menstrual rags, but its modern usage is as a menstrual euphemism.

Until disposable menstrual pads were created, cloth or reusable pads were widely used to collect menstrual blood. Women often used a variety of home-made menstrual pads which they crafted from various fabrics, or other absorbent materials, to collect menstrual blood. Even after disposable pads were commercially available, for several years they were too expensive for many families to afford. When they could be afforded, women were allowed to place money in a box so that they would not have to speak to the clerk and take a box of Kotex pads from the counter themselves. It took several years for disposable menstrual pads to become commonplace. For easier use, inventor Carolyn R. Mobley patented the tab construction for a sanitary napkin. Disposables are now used nearly exclusively in most of the industrialized world.

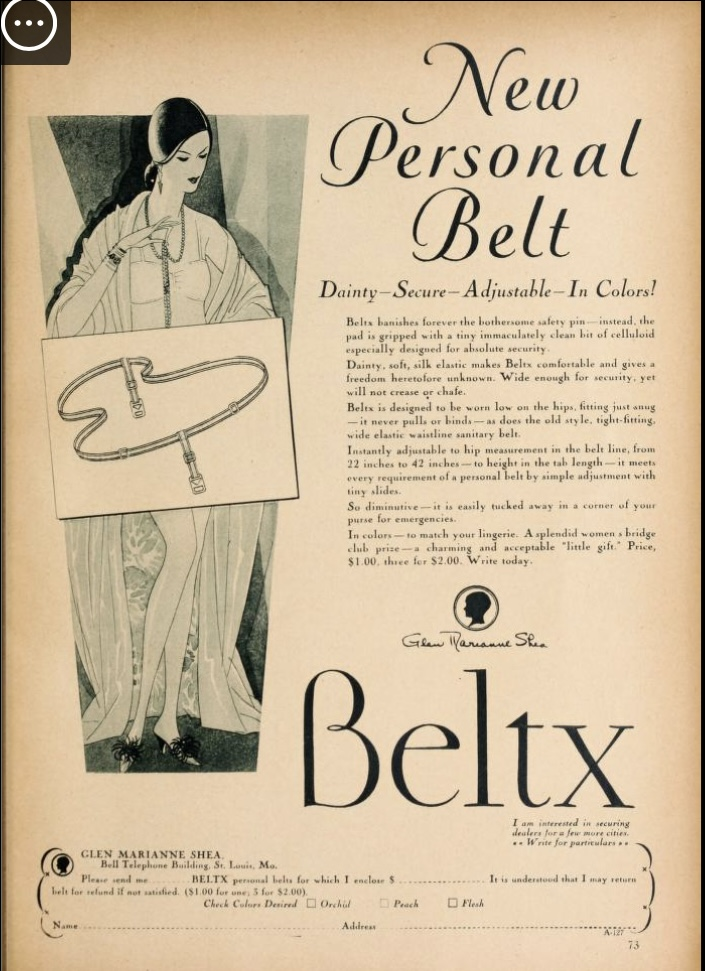
Sanitary napkin belt advertisement 1920

What are now considered “disposable menstrual pads” evolved from a Ben Franklin invention intended as a medical intervention. This invention commercially begat the feminine hygienic product known as the Southall’s pad around 1888. first of the disposable pads were generally in the form of a cotton wool or similar fibrous rectangle covered with an absorbent liner. The liner ends were extended front and back so as to fit through loops in a special girdle or belt worn beneath undergarments. This design was notorious for slipping either forward or back of the intended position.

Disposable menstrual pads appear to have been first commercially available from around 1880 with Thomas and William Southall's pad. The first commercially available American disposable napkins were Lister's Towels created by Johnson & Johnson in 1888. Disposable pads had their start with nurses using their wood pulp bandages to absorb their menstrual flow, creating a pad that was made from easily obtainable materials and inexpensive enough to throw away after use. Kotex's first advertisement for products made with this wood pulp (cellucotton) appeared in January 1921. Johnson & Johnson introduced Modess Sanitary Napkins in 1926, researched by Lillian Gilbreth. Lilian Gilbreth's market research report published in 1927 gives valuable information about American's experiences of menstruation in 1920s. The surveys she conducted on over 1000 women revealed that "the most significant fact concerning the marketing angle of the sanitary napkin [...] is that it is availability that sells a napkin." Several of the first disposable pad manufacturers were also manufacturers of bandages, which could give an indication of what these products were like.

In 1956, Mary Kenner obtained a patent for an adjustable sanitary belt with an inbuilt, moisture resistant pocket.

Later an adhesive strip was placed on the bottom of sanitary pads for attachment to the crotch of the panties, and this became a favoured method. The belted sanitary napkin quickly disappeared during the early 1980s.

The ergonomic design and materials used to make pads also changed through the 1980s to today. With earlier materials not being as absorbent and effective, and early pads being up to two centimetres thick, leaks were a major problem. Some variations introduced were quilting of the lining, adding "wings" and reducing the thickness of the pad by utilising products such as sphagnum and polyacrylate superabsorbent gels derived from petroleum. The materials used to manufacture most pads are derived from the petroleum industry and forestry. The absorbent core, made from chlorine bleached wood pulp, could be reduced to make slimmer products with the addition of polyacrylate gels which sucks up the liquid quickly and holds it in a suspension under pressure. The remaining materials are mostly derived from the petroleum industry, the cover stock used is polypropylene non woven, with the leakproof barrier made from polyethylene film.

== Society and culture ==
Pads, especially reusable ones, may be visible on full body scanners.

=== Developing countries ===
In developing countries, makeshift pads are still used to collect menstrual blood as they are cheaper. Rags, soil, and mud are also reportedly used for collecting menstrual flow by women who cannot afford the more expensive disposable pads or tampons.

In order to meet the need for achieving an inexpensive solution to reduce unsanitary and unhygienic practices in countries like India, Arunachalam Muruganantham from rural Coimbatore in the southern state of Tamil Nadu, India, developed and patented a machine which could manufacture low-cost sanitary pads for less than a third of the former cost. The Bill and Melinda Gates Foundation awarded Nairobi-based ZanaAfrica a grant of US$3 million. ZanaAfrica explores creative approaches to menstrual health education for adolescent girls.

=== Menstrual pad bans ===
The military junta ruling Myanmar since 2021 had increasingly expanded its ban on menstrual pads by the mid 2020s, arguing that menstrual pads were being used by rebel fighters "as support for their feet and boots to absorb sweat and blood." Many independent observers and NGO staff, however, believed that the policy was formulated to restrict women’s movement and amounted to gender-based violence.

== Health effects ==
In 2024 it was reported that a brand of menstrual pad was found to contain the toxic chemical PFOA.

On March 15, 2025, China Central Television (CCTV) exposed industry-wide malpractice in purchasing defective products and production waste to produce sanitary napkins. Since dozens of Chinese brand sanitary napkins were found to have false labels, and some even contained insect eggs and cockroach legs, a large number of Chinese tourists came to Hong Kong to buy sanitary napkins.
