= Leukemia virus =

Leukemia virus may refer to:

- Abelson murine leukemia virus
- Bovine leukemia virus
- Feline leukemia virus
- Human T-lymphotropic virus
- Murine leukemia virus
- Xenotropic murine leukemia virus-related virus
- Gibbon-ape leukemia virus

== See also ==
- Leucosis
