= Kevin Greenaugh =

American nuclear engineer

- Born: Kevin Charles Greenaugh; May 15, 1956; United Kingdom
- Died: December 17, 2023 (aged 67)
- Occupations: Scientist; Nuclear engineer

Kevin Charles Greenaugh (May 15, 1956 – December 17, 2023) was an American nuclear engineer who was a senior manager at the National Nuclear Security Administration (NNSA) in Washington, DC, United States.

== Early life and education ==
Greenaugh was born in the United Kingdom and raised as a US military dependent. He was in Berlin during the Cold War, later moving to Augusta, Georgia, where he and his family encountered the challenges of segregation.

Greenaugh attended school in Berlin, and later became the first African American to earn a doctorate in nuclear engineering from the University of Maryland. He received a bachelor's degree in chemistry from Mercer University, a master's in nuclear engineering from the University of New Mexico, a master's in public policy from the University of New Mexico, post-master's studies at the University of Arizona, and an engineering certificate in technology from the Massachusetts Institute of Technology.

== Career ==
Greenaugh served as the assistant deputy administrator for Strategic Partnership Programs of the National Nuclear Security Administration (NNSA). He was the senior advisor for Policy to the Administrator of NNSA.

He participated in congressional hearings, providing briefings to members of the House and Senate. He testified at a Senate Foreign Relations Committee hearing, and briefed the Senate Armed Services Committee on the science and systems of the nuclear deterrent.

Greenaugh was involved in managing the Planetary Defense Coordination Office, which focused on studying near-Earth objects and preventing potential impact. His tenure at MITRE Corporation and Los Alamos National Laboratory contributed to research on energy and nuclear non-proliferation.

Greenaugh was an adjunct professor at Howard University for over 25 years, where he taught in the School of Engineering. He also shared his expertise at the US Air Force Academy.

== Awards ==
Greenaugh was named a distinguished alumnus by Mercer University.

In 2006, he was awarded the Black Engineer of the Year award for achievement in government, by Career Communications, and cited at the A. James Clark School of Engineering, University of Maryland. He also received the Centennial Award for Science from the Omega Psi Phi fraternity in 2011, and the National Trail Blazer Award in Science.

In recognition of his achievements, the A. James Clark School of Engineering announced the Kevin C. Greenaugh Award for individuals who demonstrate Leadership and Professional Achievements and Technical Impact.

== Death ==
Greenaugh died on December 17, 2023, after a nine-month battle with pancreatic cancer.
