= Ivan Yaeger =

American inventor

- Born: June 7, 1967; Miami, Florida
- Education: Miami Shores Elementary School; North Miami Junior High School; Miami Central Senior High School
- Parent(s): Ollie Yaeger; Carl Elliot Yaeger Jr.
- Engineering career
- Institutions: University of Miami
- Employer: Yaeger Companies
- Projects: Yaeger Prosthetic Arm
- Awards: Father Surrogate of the Year Award by the Urban League; Distinguished innovator by the U.S. Patent Office; ICON Award; Miami-Dade Public Schools Hall of Fame

Ivan Yaeger (born 1967) is an American inventor, entrepreneur, and is the chief executive officer for Yaeger Companies. He is known for the Yaeger Prosthetic Arm and has received numerous awards and secured a U.S. patent. Additionally, he has contributed to his community in Miami by serving on various committee boards and is an advocate for more initiatives in education, health and economic development.

== Early life and education ==
Yaeger was born on June 7th,1967 in Miami, Florida, to parents Carl Elliot Yaeger Jr., a naturopathic and chiropractic physician and Ollie Yaeger a school guidance counselor. Yaeger comes from a lineage of physicians and philanthropists who have provided scholarships to many young people. He attended Miami Shores Elementary School and North Miami Junior High School. In seventh grade, he entered a science fair and created an artificial battery powered arm. He graduated from Miami Central Senior High School in 1984. Yaeger attended the University of Miami where he created the design for The Yaeger Arm which utilized activated sensors placed on the human body and received a U.S. patent. While Yaeger attended college, he established Yaeger Innovative Products Corporation. He graduated in 1988 earning his Bachelor of Business Administration degree in business management and organization.

== Career ==
Yaeger took on the role of a pupil advocate for AESOP in 1991, a mentorship program aimed at supporting minority students within the Miami Dade Public School system. He then founded the Yaeger Foundation Inc. in 1995, a non-profit family organization committed to providing more options for health care, educational programs, and is dedicated to the economic growth of the community. In 1996 he became the chief executive officer for Yaeger Innovative Products Corporation and his company has produced over 100 consumer, medical, industrial, and educational products. In 1997, the Yaeger Foundation launched the Technology Leaders Initiative, a workshop created in the technology field aimed at the academic success for all students.

Yaeger became the corporate relations manager in 1997 for INROADS, Inc., a non-profit organization aimed at promoting ethnic diversity in corporate America. He founded Yaeger Companies in 2000 and merged his prior ventures into a single company. Yaeger gained notoriety when he constructed a prosthetic arm equipped with sensors for an eleven-year-old girl born with Robert's Syndrome, a rare condition contributing to the malformation of her arms. Taking many of the same elements used in his first design, Yaeger is responsible for the technology and the physical construction of the artificial limbs. The prosthetic arms are manipulated by moving her back muscles and flexing her chest muscles which are connected to sensors attached to the housing unit that holds the arms to her torso.

== Patents ==
Yaeger holds the patent for an artificial arm and hand assembly. The artificial arm is powered electronically with rotating wrist and movements that resemble natural hands. He invented a therapeutic massaging device for hands and wrists and had it successfully patented in 2004. Yaeger also hold the patent for the mechanical hand kit with a remote-control system.

== Awards ==
In 1992, Yaeger was a recipient of the Father Surrogate of the Year Award by the Urban League. Yaeger was named distinguished innovator by the U.S. Patent Office in 2002. Yaeger received the ICON Award in 2006. In 2011, he was awarded the Distinguished Achievement Award. Yaeger was inducted into the Miami-Dade Public Schools Hall of Fame in 2017.
