= Lyda D. Newman =

American inventor (fl. 1892–1925)

- Born: Nineteenth century Ohio, U.S.
- Died: 1925 or later
- Occupations: Inventor, activist, hairdresser
- Known for: Activist for women's suffrage. Inventing and creating a hairbrush that was durable and could be taken apart for cleaning.

Lyda D. Newman (fl. 1892–1925) was an American hairdresser and inventor who was also an activist for women's suffrage. She held a patent for a novel hairbrush.

== Early life ==
Newman was born in Ohio, but there is no information regarding her exact dates of birth or death. She spent the majority of her life living and working in the San Juan Hill neighborhood of Manhattan, New York City. Records indicate that she may have been of mixed ancestry, as her race was cited as "mulatto" on some documents and "black" on others. Newman's primary occupation was hair care, and she listed "hair specialist" or "hairdresser" in various New York City Directories and US Government Federal and New York City censuses.

Newman also appears to have worked with hair in Newport, Rhode Island, during the summer season. The Newport Daily News contains the following advertisement in its July 20, 1903, edition:

"Lyda Newman, of New York. Hair and Scalp Specialist, Begs to announce that she has arrived for her ninth season in Newport and will be glad to receive calls from those desiring treatment. My original method of magnetic manipulation positively cures nervous exhaustion. Shampooing a specialty. 56 Bath Road."

== Trademark ==
Newman registered the trademark 'VIDACABELLO' in 1894. In the Official Gazette of the United States Patent Office, Trademark number 25,022 is noted as "VIDACABELLO, 'A PREPARATION FOR THE HAIR AND SCALP.' LYDA D. NEWMAN, New York, N.Y. Filed June 19, 1894. The 'Essential feature' of the Trademark is the word 'VIDACABELLO.' Used since August 1892."

== Patent and invention ==
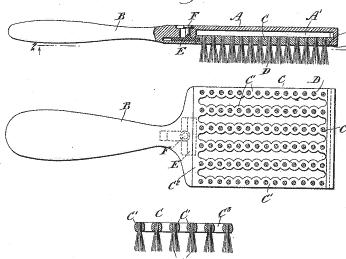
The hairbrush invented by Newman, 1898

In the 1890s, Newman invented a hairbrush which contained evenly spaced rows of bristles with open slots to clear debris away from the hair and into a recessed compartment in the back. The brush had a button which allowed the bristle holder to be removed from the back for cleaning.

The U.S. patent 614,335 was filed on July 11, 1898 and granted on November 14, 1898. The hairbrush she invented was described in her patent as "simple and durable in construction" and being "very effective when in use". Modern hairbrushes still use Newman's design, with the only changes being aesthetic. Newman's invention changed the hair-care industry, due to the fact that her design made hairbrushes less expensive, easier to manufacture, and effective to use on textured hair.

== Activism ==
Newman was an organizer for women's suffrage in the early 20th century. As a suffragist, she canvassed New York City neighborhoods, hosted street meetings to educate passing people, and opened the Negro Suffrage Headquarters in Manhattan.

On August 29, 1915, the New York Times noted under "Suffrage Centre for Negroes", "The Woman Suffrage Party is to open a suffrage headquarters for colored people at 207 West Sixty-third Street on Wednesday. This will be in charge of Miss Lyda Newman, who is doing excellent work for suffrage among her own people. The headquarters will be gayly decorated with suffrage posters, flags and streamers. Many colored women have been asked to play hostess at the new headquarters while Miss Newman goes canvassing among voters in the neighborhood [sic]."

On, September 2, 1915, the New York Times followed up with a second news blurb under "Negro Suffrage Headquarters", "Headquarters for the work of the negro suffragists were opened at 207 West Sixty-third Street last evening with a big open-air meeting outside the building. Miss Lyda D. Newman is in charge of the work, and will continue canvasing and organizing street meetings through the thirteenth Assembly District from now until election day. Dr. Mary Halton and Miss Portia Willis were among the speakers last evening. Sixty-third Street was opened yesterday as a play street with no traffic from 3 to 9 P.M., and mothers are invited to the headquarters and watch their children play from the windows [sic]."

In 1924, seven years after women's suffrage was achieved in 1917, Newman can be found on the 51st election district for New York City voter list as a registered voter.
