= Lochia =

Vaginal discharge in the first few weeks after giving birth

In obstetrics, lochia is the vaginal discharge after giving birth, containing blood, mucus, and uterine tissue. Lochia discharge typically continues for four to eight weeks after childbirth, a time known as the postpartum period or puerperium. A 2016 review ties this "lochial period" to worldwide customs of postpartum confinement, a time for the new mother and baby to bond.

Lochia is sterile for the first two days, but not so by the third or fourth day, as the uterus begins to be colonized by vaginal commensals such as non-hemolytic streptococci and E. coli. The Cleveland Clinic recommends that pads be used instead of tampons to absorb the fluid as materials should not be inserted in the vagina soon after childbirth.

== Stages ==
It progresses through three stages:

1. Lochia rubra (or cruenta) is the first discharge, composed of blood, shreds of fetal membranes, decidua, vernix caseosa, lanugo and membranes. It is red in color because of the large amount of blood it contains. It lasts 1 to 4 days after birth, before easing to light "spotting".
2. Lochia serosa is the term for lochia that has thinned and turned brownish or pink in color. It contains serous exudate, erythrocytes, leukocytes, cervical mucus and microorganisms. This stage continues until around the tenth day after delivery. Lochia serosa which persists to some weeks after birth can indicate late postpartum hemorrhaging, and should be reported to a physician.
3. Lochia alba (or purulenta) is the name for lochia once it has turned whitish or yellowish-white. It typically lasts from the second through the third to sixth weeks after delivery. It contains fewer red blood cells and is mainly made up of leukocytes, epithelial cells, cholesterol, fat, mucus and microorganisms. Continuation beyond a few weeks can indicate a genital lesion, which should be reported to a physician.

== Complications ==
In general, lochia has an odor similar to that of normal menstrual fluid. Any offensive odor or change to a greenish color indicates contamination by organisms such as Chlamydia or Staphylococcus saprophyticus.

Lochia that is retained within the uterus is known as lochiostasis or lochioschesis, and can result in lochiometra (distention of the uterus - pushing it out of shape). Lochiorrhea describes an excessive flow of lochia and can indicate infection.
