= Lee Stiff =

American mathematician

Lee Vernon Stiff (February 4, 1949 - March 19, 2021) was an American mathematics education researcher; a professor in the Department of Science, Technology, Engineering, and Mathematics Education and the Associate Dean for Faculty and Academic Affairs in the College of Education at North Carolina State University (NCSU); and the author of several mathematics textbooks. In his 72 years of living, he wrote many books.

Stiff's father was "a factory worker with only a third-grade education". Stiff studied mathematics at the University of North Carolina at Chapel Hill, graduating in 1971, and went on to earn a master's degree from Duke University in 1974 and a doctorate in mathematics education from North Carolina State University in 1978. After teaching mathematics at the middle school and high school levels, and then holding a faculty position at the University of North Carolina at Charlotte beginning in 1978, he returned to NCSU in 1983.

From 2000 to 2002 Stiff was president of the National Council of Teachers of Mathematics (NCTM). Under his leadership, the NCTM pushed for a greater emphasis on basic computational skills in elementary and secondary school mathematics education, and for an appropriate emphasis on conceptual understanding. Stiff rejected simple solutions to complex issues, saying that "Back to basics is moving backward. Number-crunching alone is no longer enough." Instead, Stiff has recommended better training and incentives for mathematics teachers, a teaching style that incorporates a variety of ways of looking at the same material, and an attitude that all students can learn mathematics regardless of their background.

In 1995 he was a Fulbright scholar in Ghana. In 2010 the NC State College of Education gave him their Distinguished Alumni Award. In 2015 he received the Benjamin Banneker Lifetime Achievement Award, in 2017 he was given the TODOS Iris M. Carl Leadership and Equity Award, and in 2019 he was honored with the NCTM Lifetime Achievement Award.

In 2019, with Drs. Valerie Faulkner and Patricia Marshall, he wrote the critically important work, The Stories We Tell: Math, Race, Bias, and Opportunity, which "...sits the "gap problem" on the doorsteps of schools and districts and off the backs of children and parents."
