= Adrian Land =

American microbiologist

Adrian Land is an American microbiologist, educator and a senior manager of affairs at Procter & Gamble as of 2022.

== Education and career ==
Land earned his Bachelor of Science in biology at Alcorn State University, and his Doctor of Philosophy in microbiology from Indiana University Bloomington. After earning his Ph.D., Land went on to Washington University in St. Louis and spent 3 years doing postdoctoral research. It was also during this time he worked at Belhaven University teaching biology as an adjunct professor. He has also served as an advisor for the biology department of Alcorn University. Before his current position at Procter & Gamble, for 4 years Land worked as a forensic microbiologist for the U.S. Food & Drug Administration. He has been a major contributing member to Microbiology papers, specifically studying pathogens. He has notably done research on Streptococcus pneumoniae while at Indiana University Bloomington, and Staphylococcus aureus while at Washington University in St. Louis.

== Other work and accolades ==
In 2011, the city of Bloomington, Indiana awarded Land, the Outstanding Black Males Leader of Tomorrow award at the cities annual Black History Month gala. This honor was for his contributions to the biology department at Indiana University Bloomington, as well as various diversity programs at the University, including the Office of Diversity Education. Land was a counselor for the biology department's Lilly Scholars program and the James Holland Summer Enrichment in Biology, the latter's goal being to bring in and provide experience to minority high school students from across the state of Indiana who are interested in science.

For its fourth annual "20 under 40" list in 2021, Indiana University's The College Magazine selected Land among the 20 alumni chosen, from across more than 70 departments and programs. The list, published in the fall issue of the college's magazine, noted Land's work in scientific journals, profile appearances in scientific magazines, including Cell Press, which named him among the most "Inspiring Black Scientists in America". Also noted in the article was his dedication to expanding access to STEM careers for students of color.
