= Hairbrush =

Brush for hair care

A hairbrush is a brush with rigid (hard or inflexible) or light and soft spokes used in hair care for smoothing, styling, and detangling human hair, or for grooming an animal's fur. It can also be used for styling in combination with a curling iron or hair dryer.

Julienne Mathieu's hair being brushed, then combed and styled in the 1908 French film Hôtel électrique.

A brush is normally used for detangling hair, for example after sleep or showering. A round brush can be used for styling and curling hair, especially by a professional stylist, often with a hair dryer. A paddle brush is used to straighten hair and tame fly-aways. For babies with fine, soft hair, many bristle materials are not suitable due to the hardness; some synthetic materials and horse/goat hair bristles are used instead.

== Animal use ==
Specialised brushes are made for cats, dogs and horses. Two different brushes can be made specifically for either short haired pets, or long haired pets. For an equine's tougher hair, a curry-comb is also used.

== Types ==
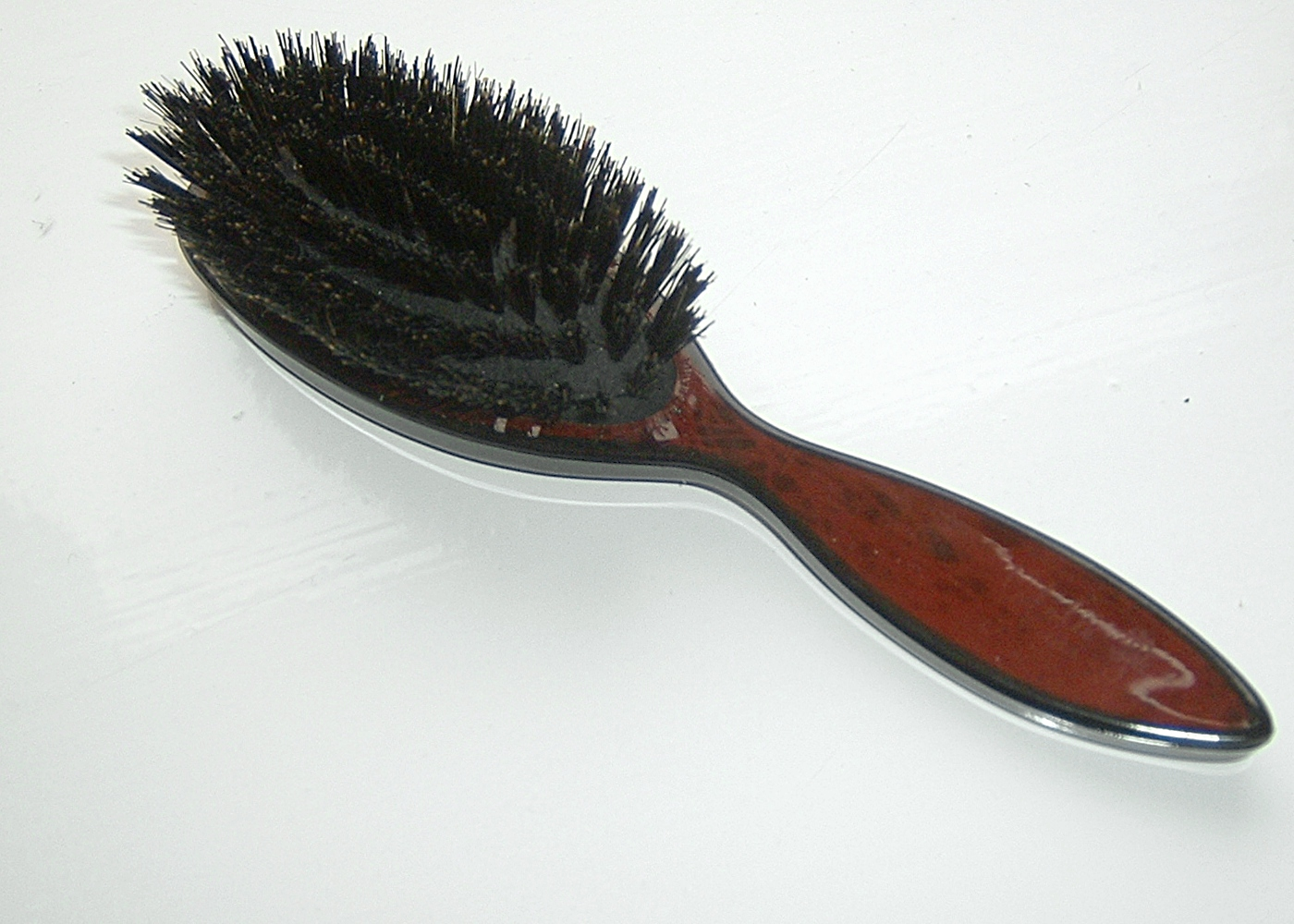
A cushion boar-bristle hairbrush is used to detangle hair.

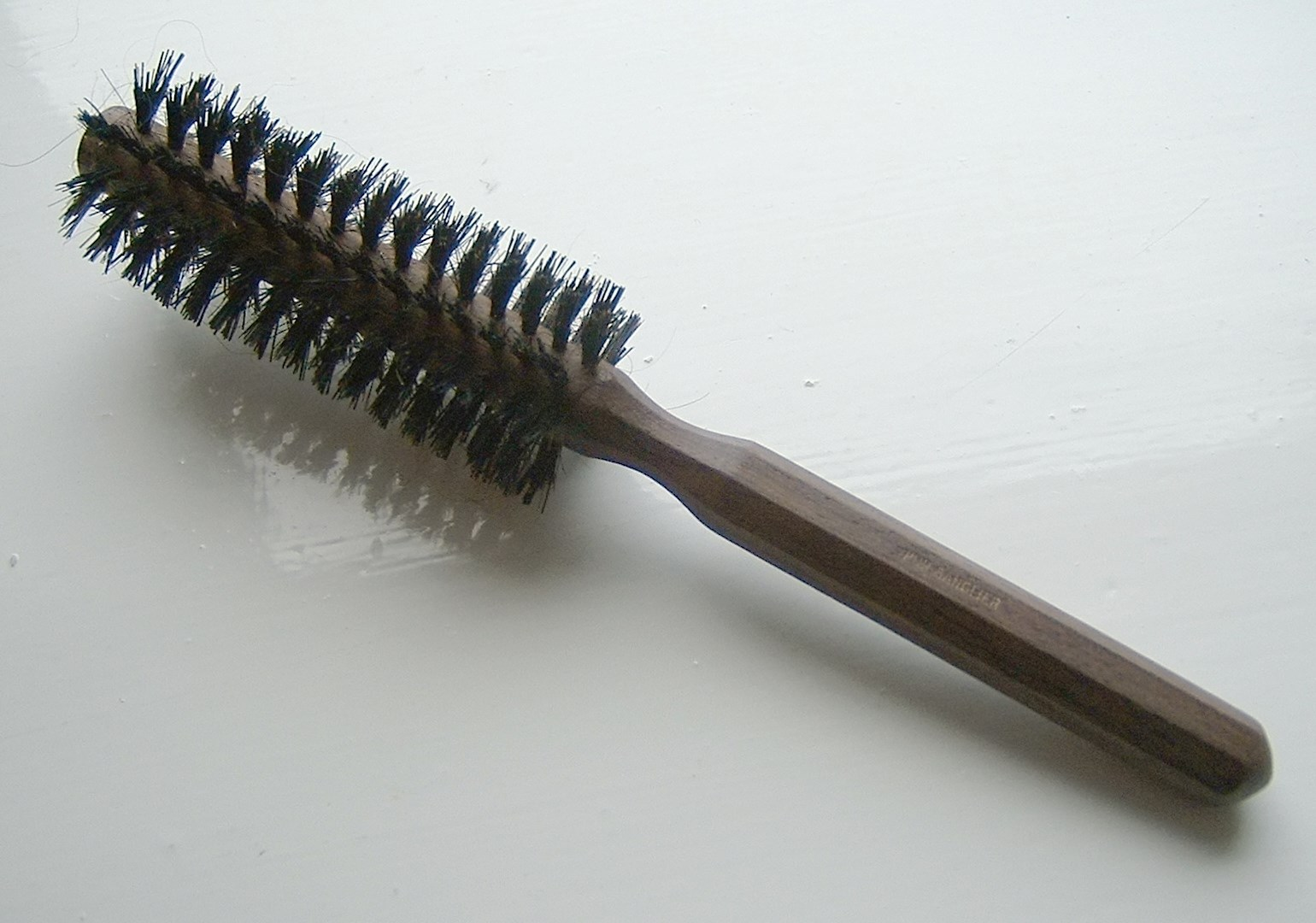
A round hairbrush is sometimes used to style medium length hair with a blowdryer.

Various types of brushes are used for different purposes, or have special features that are beneficial to certain hair types. For example:

- Round brush: Usually used with a blow dryer to add fullness and movement to the hair. Some have a metal or ceramic base which is designed to heat up during blow drying.
- Vent brush: Vents allow more air flow between the bristles but does not affect the drying time.
- Cushion brush: Bristles are mounted on a rubber cushion or mat for added flexibility, to minimize hair breakage during detangling.
- Paddle brush: A wide base allows more exposure while blow drying; flexible teeth are designed to minimize breakage, though some believe it does not work.
- Detangler brush: Features such as widely spaced, flexible, nylon teeth are designed to be gentle on tangled or knotted hair.
- Boar bristle brush: Tightly spaced boar-hair bristles are designed to increase tension while brushing, to smooth the hair.
- Blow Dryer Attachment: An additional tool that can be attached to a hair blow dryer to brush and dry hair at the same time.

The effects of brushing will be different depending texture and whether the hair is wet or dry. Straight hair typically looks smoother when brushed. Curly hair tends to expand when brushed while dry.

== Materials ==
Common materials used for the handle are ebony, rosewood, New Guinea rosewood, beech, ABS plastic and polyacetal. Common materials used for bristles include boar bristle, horsehair, nylon, stainless steel and goat hair.

== United States history ==
The earliest U.S. patent for a modern hairbrush was by Hugh Rock in 1854. A brush with elastic wire teeth along with natural bristles, was patented by Samuel Firey in 1870 as U.S. patent 106,680. In 1898, Lyda D. Newman invented an "Improved Hairbrush", which allowed for easy cleaning and had bristles separated wide enough to allow for easily combing. She was awarded U.S. patent 614,335.

== See also ==
- Comb
- Hair dryer
- Hair iron
