= Folami Ideraabdullah =

American geneticist

- Education: Pennsylvania State University; University of North Carolina at Chapel Hill; University of Pennsylvania
- Known for: Environmental impacts on imprinted genes and development
- Awards: 2020 Top 100 Inspiring Black Scientists in America by CellPress, 2019 Recipient of Vitamin D Workshop Young Investigator Award, 2008-2010 Ruth L. Kirschstein National Research Service Award
- Scientific career
- Fields: Epigenetics, nutrition
- Workplaces: University of North Carolina at Chapel Hill

Folami Ideraabdullah is an American geneticist and associate professor in the Department of Genetics and the Department of Nutrition at the Gillings School of Global Public Health at the University of North Carolina at Chapel Hill. Ideraabdullah explores how maternal nutrition and environmental toxin exposure affect development through exploring epigenetic changes to DNA. She has found that maternal Vitamin D deficiencies can cause genome-wide changes in methylation patterns that persist for several generations and impact offspring health. Her international collaboration with the University of Witwatersrand represents the first time that metal levels in the placenta have been investigated in relation to birth outcomes in South Africa.

== Early life and education ==
Ideraabdullah wanted to be a scientist from a young age. It was in her high school biology class that she learned that DNA is the blueprint for biology, and this idea fascinated her. She wanted to understand how this blueprint could generate and sustain a healthy organism, and became dedicated to science ever since.

In 1997, Ideraabdullah pursued her undergraduate studies at Pennsylvania State University in University Park, Pennsylvania. She majored in biology with a concentration in genetics and explored undergraduate research opportunities in the lab of Andrew Clark. She conducted genetics research in Drosophila, which spearheaded a continued career in genetics. Ideraabdullah graduated in 2001 with a Bachelors of Science.

Following her undergraduate degree, Ideraabdullah moved to Chapel Hill, North Carolina to conduct her graduate research at the University of North Carolina at Chapel Hill in 2002. She worked under the mentorship of Fernando Pardo-Manuel de Villena in the Department of Genetics. She explored genetic diversity through a clear evolutionary framework. Her first work in the lab helped to elucidate the sequence diversity of 20 inbred mouse strains based on substitutions, insertions, and deletions. She found that deletions are more frequent than insertions and that sequence diversity is about two orders of magnitude higher among these strains than within the human population. Her thesis worked explored the genetic architecture of DDK syndrome and the genetic basis for embryonic lethality in mice. She found that the maternal and paternal components of the DDK syndrome are non-allelic based on characterizing the candidate intervals for the gene encoding the maternal and paternal factors. She also characterized the genetic modifiers that lead to a rescue phenotype for DDK syndrome. Ideraabdullah completed her graduate training in 2007.

Following her graduate training, Ideraabdullah pursued postdoctoral work under the mentorship of Marisa Bartolomei at the Perelman School of Medicine at the University of Pennsylvania. Here, Ideraabdullah gained expertise in the study of epigenetics. She studied the molecular mechanisms of genomic imprinting, where gene expression is dependent on whether the gene was inherited from the mother or the father. Since regulation of imprinted genes was thought to be governed by the epigenetic modifications to the imprinting control region (ICR), Ideraabdullah explored whether there are regions outside the ICR that are important in the regulation of imprinted genes. She mutated different regions within the ICR for H19/IGF2 and this caused a loss of repression of the imprinted gene, yet the methylation patterns at the imprinted gene's ICR and promoter region did not change. Her findings were the first to suggest that mechanisms outside the ICR are necessary to mediate the fully repressed state of an imprinted gene. Following this finding, Ideraabdullah generated and characterized a mouse model of Beckwith-Wiedemann Syndrome (BWS), a disorder caused by aberrations in gene imprinting. Using this tool, she explored how microdeletions in the imprinting control region for H19/IGF2 cause dysregulation of epigenetic marks and imprinted gene expression. She found that the deletion did not perturb DNA methylation, though it did impact gene repression and further that the impacts of the deletion on insulator function are tissue specific, in that only mesodermal tissues have disrupted insulator function. Ideraabdullah completed her postdoctoral training in 2012.

== Career and research ==
In 2013, Ideraabdullah joined the Department of Genetics at the University of North Carolina at Chapel Hill as an assistant professor. She holds a joint appointment as an associate professor in the Department of Nutrition at the Gillings School of Global Public Health and she is an Affiliate Member of the Nutrition Research Institute in Kannapolis, North Carolina. As of 2016, Ideraabdullah became an Honorary Researcher at the University of Witwatersrand in Johannesburg, South Africa within the MRC/Wits Developmental Pathways for Health Research Unit. Ideraabdullah is also a member of the Genetics Society of America.

Ideraabdullah is the principal investigator of the Ideraabdullah Lab which studies the mechanisms by which the epigenome is modified by the environment during development. Her lab has a focus on investigating the epigenetic impacts of vitamin D deficiency, pesticide exposure, and hyperglycemia during pregnancy.

=== Nutritional impact on epigenetic landscape ===
One form of epigenetic modification is methylation, and thus methyl donor nutrients play a critical role in epigenetic modifications. Ideraabdullah was interested in exploring how maternal intake of methyl donors affects development of offspring. She found that the additive effects of a low methyl diet plus antibiotic treatment led to altered pup body weight, litter size and litter success.

Vitamin D is another critical nutrient for methylation, and vitamin D deficiency is a global problem with unknown impacts on maternal and child health. Ideraabdullah explored how maternal vitamin D deficiency alters the methylation and imprinted loci. She found that deficiencies in vitamin D in mothers led to altered body weight and loss of DNA methylation in two subsequent generations of offspring in both somatic and germline tissues. To follow this study, Ideraabdullah's team explored the genome-wide methylation patterns in mouse sperm in controls versus developmentally vitamin D depleted animals. They found that developmental depletion of vitamin D led to loss of methylation epimutations in regions enriched for developmental and metabolic genes. Overall, Ideraabdullah has established that vitamin D deficiency had substantial effects on epigenetic modifications to the adult male germline that span several generations.

=== Soweto first 1000 days cohort ===
Ideraabdullah collaborates with the University of Witwatersrand in Johannesburg, South Africa to assess how high exposure to metal affects birth outcomes. Their first study in 2019 explored if metal levels in the placenta of this cohort were related to birth outcomes. They established that the cohort had higher cadmium levels than global cohort measurements, and lower essential elements such as nickel and chromium. They found that cadmium, selenium, and nickel were all related to placenta and birth outcomes and they are currently investigating the mechanisms by which this correlation manifests.

== Awards and honors ==
- 2020 Named Top 100 Inspiring Black Scientists in America by Cell Press
- 2019 Recipient of Vitamin D Workshop Young Investigator Award
- 2015 University Research Council Award - University of North Carolina
- 2014 IBM Junior Faculty Development Award - UNC
- 2011 FASEB-MARC Travel Award - GSA Mouse Genetics Meeting
- 2010-2011 Mentored Scientist Transition Award
- 2008-2010 Ruth L. Kirschstein National Research Service Award
- 2009 Carl Storm Underrepresented Minority Fellowship
- 2006 Sarah Graham Kenan/ Edwards-Hobgood Dissertation Fellowship

== Select publications ==
- Pietryk, EW; Clement, K; Elnagheeb, M; Kuster, R; Kilpatrick, K; Love, MI; Ideraabdullah, FY (2018). "Intergenerational response to the endocrine disruptor vinclozolin is influenced by maternal genotype and crossing scheme". Reprod Toxicol. 78: 9–19. Bibcode:2018RepTx..78....9P. doi:10.1016/j.reprotox.2018.03.005. PMC 5984144. PMID 29535025.
- Ideraabdullah, FY; Zeisel, SH (2018). "Dietary Modulation of the Epigenome". Physiol Rev. 98 (2): 667–695. doi:10.1152/physrev.00010.2017. PMC 5966714. PMID 29442595.
- Xue, J; Schoenrock, SA; Valdar, W; Tarantino, LM; Ideraabdullah, FY (2016). "Maternal vitamin D depletion alters DNA methylation at imprinted loci in multiple generations". Clin Epigenetics. 8 107. doi:10.1186/s13148-016-0276-4. PMC 5062906. PMID 27777636.; PMCID: PMC5062906
- Xue, J; Ideraabdullah, FY (2016). "An assessment of molecular pathways of obesity susceptible to nutrient, toxicant and genetically induced epigenetic perturbation". J Nutr Biochem. 30: 1–13. doi:10.1016/j.jnutbio.2015.09.002. PMC 4808242. PMID 27012616.
- Ideraabdullah, FY; Thorvaldsen, JL; Myers, JA; Bartolomei, MS (2014). "Tissue-specific insulator function at H19/Igf2 revealed by deletions at the imprinting control region". Hum Mol Genet. 23 (23): 6246–59. doi:10.1093/hmg/ddu344. PMC 4222363. PMID 24990148.
- Ideraabdullah, FY; Bartolomei, MS (2011). "ZFP57: KAPturing DNA methylation at imprinted loci". Mol Cell. 44 (3): 341–2. doi:10.1016/j.molcel.2011.10.008. PMID 22055179.
- Ideraabdullah, FY; Vigneau, S; Bartolomei, MS (2008). "Genomic imprinting mechanisms in mammals". Mutat Res. 647 (1–2): 77–85. Bibcode:2008MRFMM.647...77I. doi:10.1016/j.mrfmmm.2008.08.008. PMC 2645997. PMID 18778719.
- Ideraabdullah, FY; de la Casa-Esperón, E; Bell, TA; Detwiler, DA; Magnuson, T; Sapienza, C; de Villena, FP (2004). "Genetic and haplotype diversity among wild-derived mouse inbred strains". Genome Res. 14 (10a): 1880–7. doi:10.1101/gr.2519704. PMC 524411. PMID 15466288.
