= List of accolades received by Hidden Figures =

Hidden Figures accolades
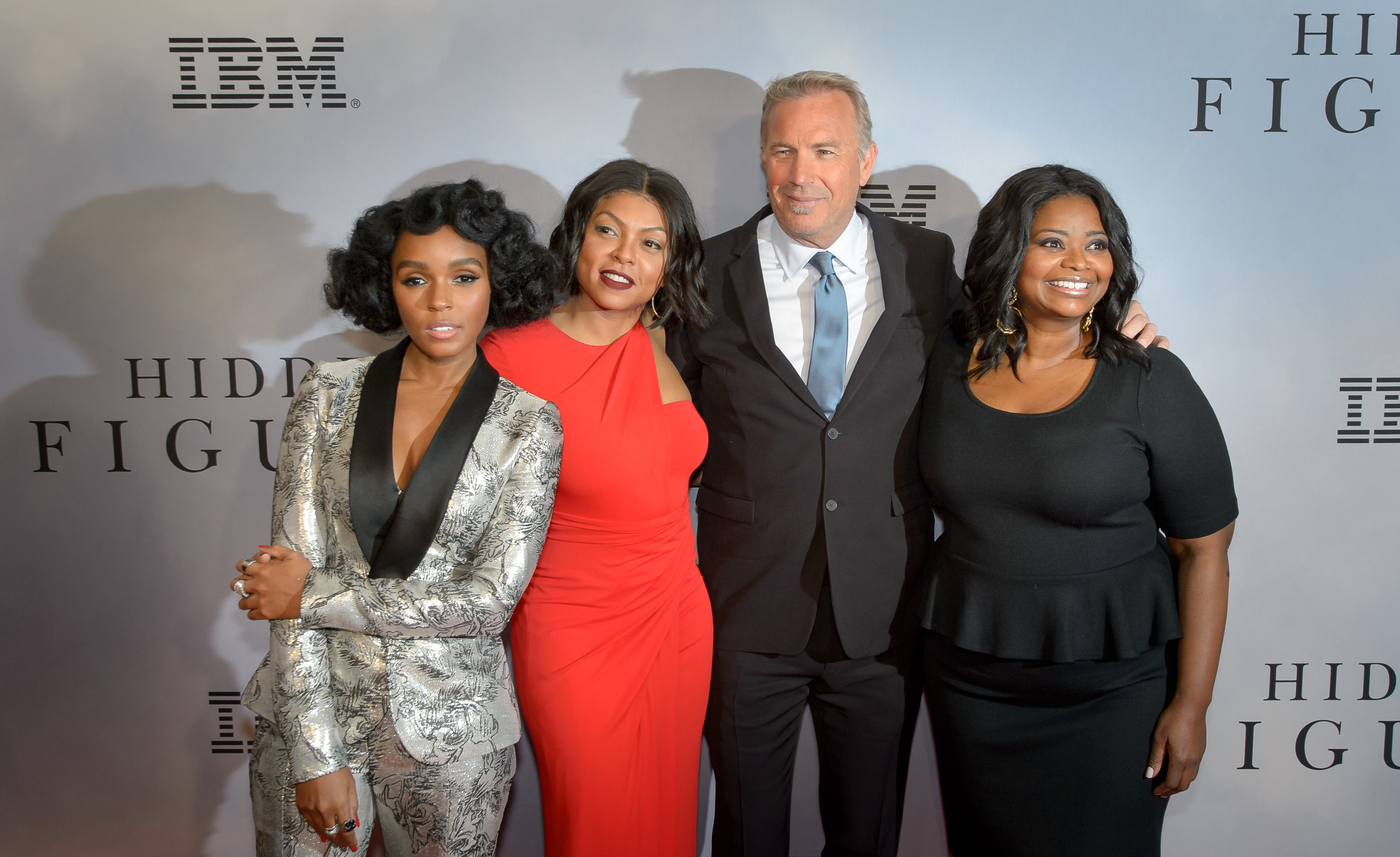
- Janelle Monáe, Taraji P. Henson, and Octavia Spencer (pictured from left to right) received awards and nominations for their performances as Mary Jackson, Katherine Johnson and Dorothy Vaughan respectively.
Accolades
Award	Wins	Nominations
AARP Movies for Grownups Awards	0	2
Academy Awards	0	3
African-American Film Critics Association Awards	4	4
Alliance of Women Film Journalists EDA Awards	0	2
Art Directors Guild Awards	1	1
Artios Awards	1	1
BET Awards	3	4
Black Reel Awards	1	6
British Academy Film Awards	0	1
Chicago Film Critics Association Awards	0	2
Christopher Awards	1	1
Costume Designers Guild Awards	1	1
Critics' Choice Movie Awards	0	3
Detroit Film Critics Society Awards	0	1
Florida Film Critics Circle Awards	1	3
Georgia Film Critics Association Awards	1	3
Golden Globe Awards	0	2
Golden Reel Awards	0	1
Golden Trailer Awards	0	3
Grammy Awards	0	2
Heartland International Film Festival Awards	1	1
Hollywood Film Awards	2	2
Hollywood Music in Media Awards	0	1
Hollywood Professional Association Awards	0	2
Houston Film Critics Society Awards	0	2
Hugo Awards	0	1
Humanitas Prize	1	1
Japan Academy Film Prize	0	1
Location Managers Guild Awards	1	1
MTV Movie & TV Awards	2	3
NAACP Image Awards	3	4
National Board of Review Awards	2	2
Online Film Critics Society Awards	0	1
Palm Springs International Film Festival Awards	1	1
Producers Guild of America Awards	0	1
San Diego Film Critics Society Awards	1	1
Santa Barbara International Film Festival Awards	1	1
Satellite Awards	1	7
Saturn Awards	1	2
Screen Actors Guild Awards	1	2
Teen Choice Awards	0	2
USC Scripter Awards	0	1
Village Voice Film Poll	1	1
Women Film Critics Circle Awards	6	6
World Soundtrack Awards	0	1
Writers Guild of America Awards	0	1

Totals (Note: Certain award groups do not simply award one winner. They acknowledge several different recipients, have runners-up, and have third place. Since this is a specific recognition and is different from losing an award, runner-up mentions are considered wins in this award tally. For simplification and to avoid errors, each award in this list has been presumed to have had a prior nomination.)
- Wins: 39
- Nominations: 95

Hidden Figures is a 2016 American biographical drama film directed by Theodore Melfi, who co-wrote the screenplay with Allison Schroeder, and based on the non-fiction book of the same name by Margot Lee Shetterly. The film stars Taraji P. Henson as Katherine Johnson, Octavia Spencer as Dorothy Vaughan, and Janelle Monáe as Mary Jackson, three female African-American mathematicians working at NASA during the Space Race. It also stars Kevin Costner, Kirsten Dunst, Jim Parsons, Mahershala Ali, Aldis Hodge, and Glen Powell.

Hidden Figures was given a limited release in the United States by 20th Century Fox from December 25, 2016, followed by a wide release on January 6, 2017. Releases in other territories followed through to March 2017. Produced on a budget of $25 million, the film grossed $235 million worldwide. The film received generally positive reviews from critics, who praised the performances (particularly Henson, Spencer and Monáe), tone, Mandy Walker's cinematography, and Renee Ehrlich Kalfus's costume design. (Note: Attributed to multiple references:) However, some argued that the film featured a white savior narrative, (Note: Attributed to multiple references:) and that its feel-good style trivialized the real story. (Note: Attributed to multiple references:) On the review aggregator website Rotten Tomatoes, the film holds an approval rating of 93% based on 323 reviews.

Hidden Figures garnered awards and nominations in a variety of categories, with particular recognition for its production values, screenplay, cast, and score. At the 89th Academy Awards, it received nominations for Best Adapted Screenplay, Best Picture and Best Supporting Actress (Spencer). It also received three nominations – Best Acting Ensemble, Best Adapted Screenplay, and Best Supporting Actress (Monáe) – at the 22nd Critics' Choice Awards, two nominations – Best Original Score and Best Supporting Actress in a Motion Picture (Spencer) – at the 74th Golden Globe Awards, and a nomination for Best Adapted Screenplay at the 70th British Academy Film Awards. The film's score and soundtrack were also recognized with nominations for Best Score Soundtrack for Visual Media and Best Compilation Soundtrack for Visual Media at the 60th Annual Grammy Awards. Hidden Figures was named one of the Top 10 Films of 2016 by the National Board of Review, while the cast won the award for Best Cast.

== Accolades ==
List of accolades received by Hidden Figures
Award	Date of ceremony	Category	Recipient(s)	Result	Ref.
AARP Movies for Grownups Awards	February 6, 2017	Best Supporting Actor	Kevin Costner	Nominated	
AARP Movies for Grownups Awards	February 6, 2017	Best Time Capsule	Hidden Figures	Nominated	
Academy Awards	February 26, 2017	Best Picture	Donna Gigliotti, Peter Chernin, Jenno Topping, Pharrell Williams and Theodore Melfi	Nominated	
Academy Awards	February 26, 2017	Best Supporting Actress	Octavia Spencer	Nominated	
Academy Awards	February 26, 2017	Best Adapted Screenplay	Allison Schroeder and Theodore Melfi	Nominated	
African-American Film Critics Association Awards	February 8, 2017	Best Ensemble	Hidden Figures	Won	
African-American Film Critics Association Awards	February 8, 2017	Best Song	"I See a Victory" (Kim Burrell and Pharrell Williams)	Won	
African-American Film Critics Association Awards	February 8, 2017	Breakout Performance 2017	Janelle Monáe	Won (Note: Also for Moonlight)	
African-American Film Critics Association Awards	February 8, 2017	Top 10 Films	Hidden Figures	3rd Place	
Alliance of Women Film Journalists EDA Awards	December 21, 2016	Best Breakthrough Performance	Janelle Monáe	Nominated	
Alliance of Women Film Journalists EDA Awards	December 21, 2016	Best Supporting Actress	Octavia Spencer	Nominated	
Art Directors Guild Awards	February 11, 2017	Excellence in Production Design for a Period Film	Wynn Thomas	Won	
Artios Awards	January 19, 2017	Feature Big Budget – Drama	Victoria Thomas, Jackie Burch and Bonnie Grisan	Won	
BET Awards	June 25, 2017	Best Movie	Hidden Figures	Won	
BET Awards	June 25, 2017	Best Actress	Taraji P. Henson	Won	
BET Awards	June 25, 2017	Best Actor	Mahershala Ali	Won	
BET Awards	June 25, 2017	Best Actress	Janelle Monáe	Nominated	
Black Reel Awards	February 16, 2017	Outstanding Actress	Taraji P. Henson	Nominated	
Black Reel Awards	February 16, 2017	Outstanding Ensemble	Hidden Figures	Nominated	
Black Reel Awards	February 16, 2017	Outstanding Breakthrough Performance, Female	Janelle Monáe	Won	
Black Reel Awards	February 16, 2017	Outstanding Original Score	Benjamin Wallfisch, Hans Zimmer and Pharrell Williams	Nominated	
Black Reel Awards	February 16, 2017	Outstanding Original Song	"Surrender" (Lalah Hathaway and Pharrell Williams)	Nominated	
Black Reel Awards	February 16, 2017	Outstanding Supporting Actress	Janelle Monáe	Nominated	
British Academy Film Awards	February 12, 2017	Best Adapted Screenplay	Allison Schroeder and Theodore Melfi	Nominated	
Chicago Film Critics Association Awards	December 15, 2016	Most Promising Performer	Janelle Monáe	Nominated	
Chicago Film Critics Association Awards	December 15, 2016	Best Supporting Actress	Janelle Monáe	Nominated	
Christopher Awards	May 16, 2017	Feature Films	Hidden Figures	Won	
Costume Designers Guild Awards	February 21, 2017	Excellence in Period Film	Renee Ehrlich Kalfus	Won	
Critics' Choice Movie Awards	December 11, 2016	Best Acting Ensemble	Hidden Figures	Nominated	
Critics' Choice Movie Awards	December 11, 2016	Best Adapted Screenplay	Allison Schroeder and Theodore Melfi	Nominated	
Critics' Choice Movie Awards	December 11, 2016	Best Supporting Actress	Janelle Monáe	Nominated	
Detroit Film Critics Society Awards	December 19, 2016	Best Breakthrough	Mahershala Ali	Nominated	
Florida Film Critics Circle Awards	December 23, 2016	Best Ensemble	Hidden Figures	Nominated	
Florida Film Critics Circle Awards	December 23, 2016	Best Supporting Actress	Octavia Spencer	Nominated	
Florida Film Critics Circle Awards	December 23, 2016	Top Ten Films	Hidden Figures	9th Place	
Georgia Film Critics Association Awards	January 13, 2017	Best Ensemble	Hidden Figures	Nominated	
Georgia Film Critics Association Awards	January 13, 2017	Breakthrough Award	Mahershala Ali	Won (Note: Also for Moonlight, Free State of Jones (film) and Kicks (film))	
Georgia Film Critics Association Awards	January 13, 2017	Oglethorpe Award for Excellence in Georgia Cinema	Allison Schroeder and Theodore Melfi	Nominated	
Golden Globe Awards	January 8, 2017	Best Original Score	Hans Zimmer, Pharrell Williams and Benjamin Wallfisch	Nominated	
Golden Globe Awards	January 8, 2017	Best Supporting Actress in a Motion Picture	Octavia Spencer	Nominated	
Golden Reel Awards	February 19, 2017	Best Sound Editing in Feature Film – Dialogue/ADR	Wayne Lemmer, Derek Vanderhost, Susan Dawes, Helen Luttrell and RJ Kizer	Nominated	
Golden Trailer Awards	May 12, 2017	Best Drama	20th Century Fox and Giaronomo Productions (for "Trailer C")	Nominated	
Golden Trailer Awards	May 12, 2017	Best Drama Poster	20th Century Fox and Ignition (for "Domestic One-Sheet")	Nominated	
Golden Trailer Awards	May 12, 2017	Best International Poster	20th Century Fox and Ignition (for "International One-Sheet")	Nominated	
Grammy Awards	January 28, 2018	Best Compilation Soundtrack for Visual Media	Hidden Figures: The Album – Pharrell Williams	Nominated	
Grammy Awards	January 28, 2018	Best Score Soundtrack for Visual Media	Benjamin Wallfisch, Pharrell Williams and Hans Zimmer	Nominated	
Heartland International Film Festival Awards	October 30, 2016	Truly Moving Picture Award	Hidden Figures	Won	
Hollywood Film Awards	November 6, 2016	Hollywood Production Design Award	Wynn Thomas	Won	
Hollywood Film Awards	November 6, 2016	Hollywood Spotlight Award	Janelle Monáe	Won	
Hollywood Music in Media Awards	November 17, 2016	Best Original Song – Feature Film	"Runnin'" (Pharrell Williams)	Nominated	
Hollywood Professional Association Awards	November 6, 2016	Outstanding Color Grading – Feature Film	Natasha Leonnet	Nominated	
Hollywood Professional Association Awards	November 6, 2016	Outstanding Editing – Feature Film	Peter Teschner	Nominated	
Houston Film Critics Society	January 6, 2017	Best Original Song	"Runnin'" (Pharrell Williams)	Nominated	
Houston Film Critics Society	January 6, 2017	Best Supporting Actress	Octavia Spencer	Nominated	
Hugo Awards	August 11, 2017	Best Dramatic Presentation, Long Form	Allison Schroeder and Theodore Melfi	Nominated	
Humanitas Prize	February 22, 2017	Feature Film	Allison Schroeder and Theodore Melfi	Won (Note: Tied with Andrew Knight and Robert Schenkkan for Hacksaw Ridge)	
Japan Academy Film Prize	March 2, 2018	Outstanding Foreign Language Film	Hidden Figures	Nominated	
Location Managers Guild Awards	April 8, 2017	Outstanding Locations in Period Film	Wes Hagan and Dan Gorman	Won	
MTV Movie & TV Awards	May 7, 2017	Best Actor in a Movie	Taraji P. Henson	Nominated	
MTV Movie & TV Awards	May 7, 2017	Best Hero	Taraji P. Henson	Won	
MTV Movie & TV Awards	May 7, 2017	Best Fight Against the System	Hidden Figures	Won	
NAACP Image Awards	February 11, 2017	Outstanding Actress in a Motion Picture	Taraji P. Henson	Won	
NAACP Image Awards	February 11, 2017	Outstanding Motion Picture	Hidden Figures	Won	
NAACP Image Awards	February 11, 2017	Outstanding Song – Traditional	"I See a Victory" (Kim Burrell and Pharrell Williams)	Won	
NAACP Image Awards	February 11, 2017	Outstanding Supporting Actress in a Motion Picture	Octavia Spencer	Nominated	
National Board of Review Awards	January 4, 2017	Best Cast	Hidden Figures	Won	
National Board of Review Awards	January 4, 2017	Top 10 Films	Hidden Figures	Won (Note: This award does not have a single winner, but recognizes multiple films.)	
Online Film Critics Society Awards	January 3, 2017	Best Supporting Actress	Octavia Spencer	Nominated	
Palm Springs International Film Festival Awards	January 2, 2017	Ensemble Performance Award	Hidden Figures Cast	Won	
Producers Guild of America Awards	January 28, 2017	Darryl F. Zanuck Award for Outstanding Producer of Theatrical Motion Pictures	Donna Gigliotti, Peter Chernin, Jenno Topping, Pharrell Williams and Theodore Melfi	Nominated	
San Diego Film Critics Society Awards	December 12, 2016	Best Ensemble	Hidden Figures	Runner-up	
Santa Barbara International Film Festival Awards	February 4, 2017	Virtuosos Award	Janelle Monáe	Won	
Satellite Awards	February 19, 2017	Best Film	Hidden Figures	Nominated	
Satellite Awards	February 19, 2017	Best Actress in a Motion Picture	Taraji P. Henson	Nominated	
Satellite Awards	February 19, 2017	Best Adapted Screenplay	Allison Schroeder and Theodore Melfi	Nominated	
Satellite Awards	February 19, 2017	Best Cast	Hidden Figures	Won	
Satellite Awards	February 19, 2017	Best Original Score	Hans Zimmer, Pharrell Williams and Benjamin Wallfisch	Nominated	
Satellite Awards	February 19, 2017	Best Original Song	"Runnin'" (Pharrell Williams)	Nominated	
Satellite Awards	February 19, 2017	Best Supporting Actress	Octavia Spencer	Nominated	
Saturn Awards	June 28, 2017	Best Action or Adventure Film	Hidden Figures	Won	
Saturn Awards	June 28, 2017	Best Actress	Taraji P. Henson	Nominated	
Screen Actors Guild Awards	January 29, 2017	Outstanding Performance by a Cast in a Motion Picture	Hidden Figures	Won	
Screen Actors Guild Awards	January 29, 2017	Outstanding Performance by a Female Actor in a Supporting Role	Octavia Spencer	Nominated	
Teen Choice Awards	August 13, 2017	Choice Movie – Drama	Hidden Figures	Nominated	
Teen Choice Awards	August 13, 2017	Choice Movie Actress – Drama	Taraji P. Henson	Nominated	
USC Scripter Awards	February 11, 2017	Best Adapted Screenplay	Allison Schroeder and Theodore Melfi (adapted from Hidden Figures by Margot Lee Shetterly)	Nominated	
Village Voice Film Poll	December 21, 2016	Best Supporting Actress	Janelle Monáe	6th Place	
Women Film Critics Circle Awards	December 18, 2016	Best Ensemble	Hidden Figures	Won	
Women Film Critics Circle Awards	December 18, 2016	Best Female Images in a Movie	Hidden Figures	Won	
Women Film Critics Circle Awards	December 18, 2016	Best Movie about Women	Hidden Figures	Won	
Women Film Critics Circle Awards	December 18, 2016	Invisible Woman Award	Hidden Figures	Won	
Women Film Critics Circle Awards	December 18, 2016	Josephine Baker Award	Hidden Figures	Won	
Women Film Critics Circle Awards	December 18, 2016	Karen Morley Award	Hidden Figures	Won	
World Soundtrack Awards	February 11, 2017	Best Original Song	"Runnin'" (Pharrell Williams)	Nominated	
Writers Guild of America Awards	February 19, 2017	Best Adapted Screenplay	Allison Schroeder and Theodore Melfi	Nominated	
