= Hidden Figures (disambiguation) =

Hidden Figures is a 2016 American film loosely based on the book by Margot Lee Shetterly.

Hidden Figures or Hidden Figure may also refer to:

- Hidden Figures (book), nonfiction by Margot Lee Shetterly
  - Hidden Figures (picture book), by Margot Lee Shetterly
- Operation Hidden Figure, Brazil

== See also ==
- Hidden figure of crime
