= Hidden Figures (picture book) =

2018 picture book

Hidden Figures: The True Story of Four Black Women and the Space Race
- First edition cover of Hidden Figures
- Author: Margot Lee Shetterly, Winifred Conkling
- Illustrator: Laura Freeman
- Language: English
- Genre: picture book
- Published: 2018 (HarperCollins Children's Books)
- Publication place: United States
- Awards: Coretta Scott King Award honor book for illustrator
- ISBN: 978-0-06-274246-9

Hidden Figures: The True Story of Four Black Women and the Space Race is a 2018 picture book by Margot Lee Shetterly with Winifred Conkling, illustrated by Laura Freeman. The picture book is adapted from Shetterly's 2016 non-fiction book Hidden Figures: The American Dream and the Untold Story of the Black Women Who Helped Win the Space Race, that was adapted into the 2016 movie Hidden Figures. In 2019, the picture book was adapted into a 15-minute animated film, narrated by Octavia Spencer and released by Weston Woods Studios.

== Summary ==
Hidden Figures tells the true story of four African-American female mathematicians working at NASA from the 1940s to the 1960s. It follows Katherine Johnson, Mary Jackson, Dorothy Vaughan, and Christine Darden.

Set against the backdrop of World War II, the Cold War, and the Space Race, the book depicts the work that Johnson, Jackson, and Vaughan did for NASA (previously National Advisory Committee for Aeronautics) as Computers at the Langley Research Center. Additionally, Hidden Figures describes Darden's later work on supersonic flight and sonic booms at Langley Research Center as well.

The women faced many challenges including discrimination due to their race and gender during their time at NASA. Until 1958, they were forced to work under segregated conditions. Hidden Figures details their resilience and dedication as they overcame hardship and changed American history.

The book also includes a timeline of space and aeronautics research, additional biographies about each of the women and a glossary for younger children.

== Reception ==
Kirkus Reviews called the Hidden Figures "an important story to tell about four heroines." Writing for School Library Journal, Megan Kilgallen said "Freeman's full-color illustrations are stunning and chock-full of details, incorporating diagrams, mathematical formulas, and space motifs throughout ... enhancing the whole book."

Hidden Figures was named a Coretta Scott King Award honor book for illustration.

== See also ==
- Hidden Figures (book), 2016 book
- Hidden Figures, 2016 film
