= Laura Freeman =

Children's book illustrator

Laura Freeman is a children's book illustrator. She received her BFA from the School of Visual Arts in New York City. She has illustrated many books, and done work for Highlights for Children. In a review of the picture book version of Hidden Figures, writing for School Library Journal, Megan Kilgallen said "Freeman’s full-color illustrations are stunning and chock-full of details, incorporating diagrams, mathematical formulas, and space motifs throughout... enhancing the whole book." She shared the 2019 NAACP Image Award for Outstanding Literary Work – Children with writer Margot Lee Shetterly for Hidden Figures.

== Early life ==
A native of New York City, Freeman was the older of two girls born to African American father, James Freeman, and Russian-Jewish mother, Gertrude. Her sister is the singer Roberta Freeman.

Freeman knew she wanted to become an illustrator when she was just five years old and learned it was a career choice. She would go on to want to be a ballerina, then an editorial illustrator, and finally came back to her illustrator dream.

She chose to go to the School of Visual Arts because she recognized the vast experience in illustration held by the faculty, and because it was a fairly inexpensive option for her at the time.

== Career ==
Laura Freeman did not become a successful illustrator right away. She did odd jobs to make ends meet, including painting storefront windows, waitressing, and working for Polo and Ralph Lauren. The first hardcover book she illustrated was Jazz Baby by Carole Boston Weatherford, which was published in 2002. The first book she both wrote and illustrated was Natalie's Hair Was Wild!

Though she has used many mediums in the past, Freeman primarily works in Photoshop when illustrating children's books, even when sketching out early drafts of pages. She begins with a manuscript of the text and an idea of how the text and illustrations will be laid out. Freeman values research when beginning new projects, especially when illustrating biographies. Before the internet, she frequented the New York Public Library picture file, where she could find images of just about anything she could need. Freeman enjoys illustrating for biographies because she likes to learn about the people she's depicting, and she hopes the children who read these stories will be able to see themselves in these influential figures. She describes her style as being fairly true to life, while still feeling playful. Her experimenting with colors and textures give her illustrations a collage feel.

== List of works ==
=== Illustrator and author ===
- Natalie's Hair Was Wild!
- Here We Go Looby Loo
- If You're Happy and You Know It

=== Illustrator ===
- A Seat at the Table: The Nancy Pelosi Story by Elisa Boxer (2022)
- Kwame Nkrumah's Midnight Speech for Independence By Useni Eugene Perkins (2022)
- Ida B. Wells, Voice of Truth by Michelle Duster (2022)
- The Faith of Elijah Cummings: The North Star of Equal Justice by Carole Boston Weatherford (2022)
- Standing on Her Shoulders by Monica Clark-Robinson (2021)
- Stompin' at The Savoy by Moira Rose Donahue (2021)
- The Highest Tribute by Kekla Magoon (2021)
- Kamala Harris: Rooted in Justice by Nikki Grimes (2021)
- Follow Chester! A College Football Team Fights Racism and Makes History by Gloria Respress-Churchwell
- Pies from Nowhere: How Georgia Gilmore Sustained The Montgomery Bus Boycott by Dee Romito
- Fancy Party Gowns: The Story of Fashion Designer Ann Cole Lowe by Deborah Blumenthal
- Hidden Figures (by Margot Lee Shetterly, 2017)
- Althea Gibson: The Story of Tennis' Fleet-of-Foot Girl (by Megan Reid, 2020)
- Dream Builder: The Story of Architect Philip Freelon (by Kelly Starling Lyons, 2020)
- A Voice Named Aretha (by Katheryn Russel-Brown, 2020)
- Biddy Mason Speaks Up (by Arisa White and Laura Atkins)
- The Carver Chronicles Series (by Karen English)
  1. Dog Days (?)
  2. Skateboard Party (2015)
  3. Don't Feed the Geckos! (?)
  4. Problemas en la Casa de la Lado (?)
  5. The New Kid (?)
  6. Pizza Party (?)
- Nikki and Deja Series (by Karen English)
  - Nikki and Deja (2007)
  - Birthday Blues (2010)
  - The Newsy News Newsletter (2011)
  - Election Madness (2011)
- Pies from Nowhere: How Georgia Gilmore Sustained the Montgomery Bus Boycott (by Dee Romito)
- Friends I Love to Keep (by Wade Hudson)
- Sights I Love to See (by Cheryl Willis Hudson)
- Songs I Love to Sing (by Cheryl Willis Hudson)
- Jazz Baby (by Carole Boston Weatherford)
- L Is for Liberty (by Wendy Cheyette Lewison)

== List of clients ==
- Bloomsbury Books
- Clarion Books
- Disney/Jump at the Sun
- Evergreen Flag & Garden
- HarperCollins
- Highlights
- Homefires Rugs
- Lee & Low Books
- Little Bee Books
- National Geographic Books
- The National Law Journal
- New York
- The New York Times
- Scholastic Magazines
- Toland Flags
- United Methodist Publishing

== Honors and awards ==
- 2019 Coretta Scott King Illustrator Honor (Hidden Figures)
- 2019 NAACP Image Award for Outstanding Literary Work for Children (Hidden Figures)
- 2019 SCBWI Crystal Kite Award (Pies from Nowhere)
- 2018 Selected as a "Children's Book All Young Georgians Should Read" (Hidden Figures)
- 2018 American Illustration AI37
- 2017 Communications Arts Illustration Annual
- 6 Junior Library Guild Selections (Nikki & Deja and The Carver Chronicles)
- 2009 Chicago Public Library Best of the Best Book Award Honor (Birthday Blues)
- 2004 Seal of Excellence - Creative Child magazine (A Wild Cowboy)

== Current life ==
Today, Freeman lives with her family in Atlanta, Georgia.

To encourage those who dream of becoming writers or illustrators, Freeman says the key is to be persistent and to put in the hours to achieve those dreams.
