= Kazimierz Czarnecki =

Kazimierz Czarnecki may refer to:

- Kazimierz Czarnecki (weightlifter)
- Kazimierz Czarnecki (engineer)
