= Christine Darden =

American mathematician, aerospace engineer

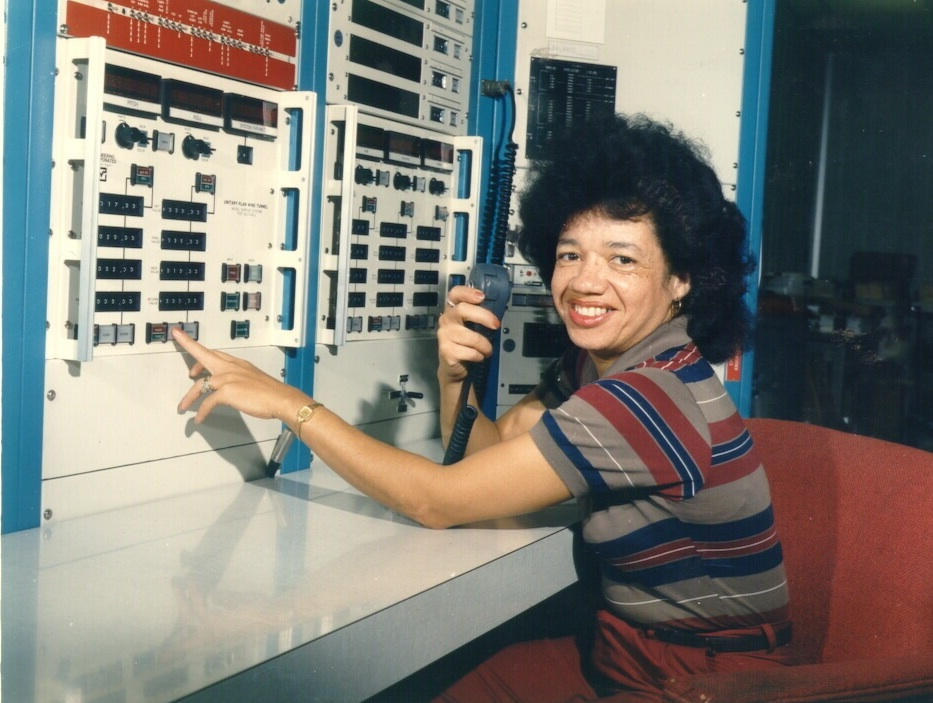
- Christine Darden in Langley's Unitary Plan Wind Tunnel in 1975. Credit: NASA
- Born: Christine Mann; September 10, 1942 (age 84); Monroe, North Carolina, U.S.
- Education: Hampton University (BS); Virginia State University (MS); George Washington University (DSc)
- Known for: Technical Leader of NASA's Sonic Boom Group
- Awards: Dr. A. T. Weathers Technical Achievement Award, 1985; Senior Executive Career Development Fellowship, 1994; Candace Award for Science and Technology from the National Coalition of 100 Black Women, 1987
- Scientific career
- Fields: Aeronautical engineering

Christine Darden (née Mann; born September 10, 1942) is an American aeronautical engineer who devoted much of her 40-year career in aerodynamics at NASA to research supersonic flight and sonic booms. She was the first African-American woman at NASA's Langley Research Center to be promoted to the Senior Executive Service, the top rank in the federal civil service.

Darden is one of the researchers featured in the book Hidden Figures: The American Dream and the Untold Story of the Black Women Mathematicians Who Helped Win the Space Race (2016), a history of some of the influential African-American women mathematicians and engineers at NASA in the mid-20th century, by Margot Lee Shetterly.

In 2019, Darden was awarded the Congressional Gold Medal.

== Early life and education ==
Christine Mann was born September 10, 1942, to schoolteacher Desma l. Cheney and insurance agent Noah Horace Mann Sr. in Monroe, North Carolina. Both parents encouraged her to pursue a quality education. Starting from age three, Darden was brought by her mother to her own classroom where she taught, and at age four, Darden was enrolled in kindergarten. During elementary school, Darden took a great interest in breaking apart and reconstructing mechanical objects like her bicycle. Darden finished her last two years of primary school at Allen High School, a boarding school in Asheville, North Carolina.

She graduated as the class valedictorian in 1958, subsequently receiving a scholarship to attend Hampton University, a historically black college then known as Hampton Institute. During her studies at Hampton, she participated in some of the early protests of the Civil Rights Movement. She participated in several student sit-ins alongside her other Black peers. Mann graduated from Hampton with a B.S. in Mathematics in 1962. She also earned a teaching certification, and taught high school mathematics for a brief time.

== Career ==
=== Teaching ===
In 1963, Mann married Walter L. Darden Jr., a middle-school science teacher. In 1965 she became a research assistant at Virginia State College, studying aerosol physics. In 1967, Darden earned an M.S. from Virginia State and taught classes there.

=== Langley Research Center ===
In 1967, Darden started working as a human computer in the Langley Research Center computer pool at NASA. By that time, computers were increasingly used for the complex calculations to support engineering and design. The department, once tasked with processing scores of collected flight test data, by the 1940s had garnered a reputation as "human computers" who were essential to NASA's operation. During the 1950s and 1960s, more of these women gained opportunities to advance as technicians and engineers.

In 1983, Darden earned a D.Sc. in engineering from George Washington University and was promoted to aerospace engineer. She specialized in analyzing supersonic noise. In 1989, Darden was appointed as leader of the sonic boom team, a subsidiary of the High Speed Research (HSR) Program. She worked on designs to decrease the negative effects of sonic booms, such as noise pollution and the depletion of the ozone layer. Her team tested new wing and nose designs for supersonic aircraft.

The program was canceled by the government in February 1998, "without fan fare or press announcement." 1998 abstract published by Darden describes the program as focused on "technologies needed for the development of an environmentally friendly, economically viable High-Speed Civil Transport [HSCT]." Darden wrote more than 50 articles in the general field of aeronautical design, specializing in supersonic flow and flap design, as well as the prediction and minimization of sonic booms.

In 1999, Darden became the director of the Aero-Performing Center Management Office. She was the first African-American woman at Langley to be promoted into the Senior Executive Service, the top rank in the federal civil service.

In March 2007, Darden retired from NASA as director of the Office of Strategic Communication and Education.

=== Awards ===
In 1985, Darden received the Dr. A. T. Weathers Technical Achievement Award from the National Technical Association. She received a Candace Award from the National Coalition of 100 Black Women in 1987. She received three Certificates of Outstanding Performance from Langley Research Center: in 1989, 1991, and 1992.

On January 28, 2018, Darden received the Presidential Citizenship Award at Hampton University in recognition for her contribution and service".

Darden received an honorary degree from North Carolina State University on December 19, 2018.

Darden also received an honorary degree from the George Washington University on May 19, 2019.

In 2019, Darden was awarded the Congressional Gold Medal.

She delivered the Christine Darden Lecture at MathFest 2021.
