= 20th Hollywood Film Awards =

US film awards ceremony in 2016

- Location: Los Angeles, California
- Founded: 1997
- Festival date: November 6, 2016
- Website: www.hollywoodawards.com

The 20th Hollywood Film Awards were held on November 6, 2016. The ceremony took place at The Beverly Hilton Hotel in Santa Monica, California.

== Winners ==
Hollywood Career Achievement Award
Eddie Murphy
Hollywood Actor Award
Tom Hanks – Sully
Hollywood Supporting Actor Award
Hugh Grant – Florence Foster Jenkins
Hollywood Actress Award
Natalie Portman – Jackie
Hollywood Supporting Actress Award
Nicole Kidman – Lion
Hollywood Comedy Award
Robert De Niro – The Comedian
Hollywood Breakout Actress Award
Naomie Harris – Collateral Beauty, Moonlight
New Hollywood Award
Lily Collins – Rules Don't Apply
Spotlight Award
Janelle Monáe – Hidden Figures
Hollywood Ensemble Award
Bryce Dallas Howard, Stacy Keach, Matthew McConaughey, and Édgar Ramírez – Gold
Hollywood Song Award
Justin Timberlake – "Can't Stop the Feeling!" from the Trolls soundtrack
Hollywood Documentary Award
Leonardo DiCaprio and Fisher Stevens – Before the Flood
Hollywood Blockbuster Award
The Jungle Book
Hollywood Animation Award
Zootopia
Hollywood Director Award
Mel Gibson – Hacksaw Ridge
Hollywood Breakthrough Director Award
Tom Ford – Nocturnal Animals
Hollywood Producer Award
Marc Platt – Billy Lynn's Long Halftime Walk, The Girl on the Train, and La La Land
Hollywood Screenwriter Award
Kenneth Lonergan – Manchester by the Sea
Hollywood Cinematography Award
Linus Sandgren – La La Land
Hollywood Film Composer Award
Mychael Danna – Billy Lynn's Long Halftime Walk, Storks
Hollywood Editor Award
John Gilbert – Hacksaw Ridge
Hollywood Visual Effects Award
Stephane Ceretti and Richard Bluff – Doctor Strange
Hollywood Sound Award
Christopher Boyes and Frank E. Eulner – The Jungle Book
Hollywood Costume Design Award
Albert Wolsky – Rules Don't Apply
Hollywood Make-Up & Hair Styling Award
Angela Conte, Bec Taylor, Shane Thomas, and Noriko Watanabe – Hacksaw Ridge
Hollywood Production Design Award
Wynn Thomas – Hidden Figures
