= Kazimierz Czarnecki (engineer) =

Polish-American aerospace engineer (1916–2005)

- Born: 1916; Poland
- Died: 30 January 2005 (aged 88–89); Newport News, Virginia, United States
- Education: University of Alabama
- Scientific career
- Fields: Aeronautics engineer
- Workplaces: NASA

Kazimierz R. Czarnecki (1916 – 30 January 2005) was an aeronautics engineer who worked for the National Advisory Committee for Aeronautics, and later, for the National Aeronautics and Space Administration.

== Biography ==
Kazimierz R. Czarnecki was born in 1916 in Poland (at the time under occupation of the Government General of Warsaw and the Military Government of Lublin), to a Polish family. He immigrated to the United States in an unknown year. He graduated in 1939 from the University of Alabama. He started working with the National Advisory Committee for Aeronautics that same year and remained through the renaming to the National Aeronautics and Space Administration until his retirement in 1978 from a position as Senior Aeronautical Research Engineer. He published many papers together with Mary W. Jackson, serving as her long-time mentor. In 1979, Jackson had organized his retirement party.

Czarnecki died on 30 January 2005, in Newport News, Virginia, United States.

== Depictions in popular culture ==
In the 2016 film Hidden Figures, the character of Karl Zielinski was a fictionalized version of Czarnecki featured as a wind tunnel expert, who worked together with Mary W. Jackson.

== Publications ==
- Czarnecki, K. R.; Jackson, Mary W. (September 1958), Effects of Nose Angle and Mach Number on Transition on Cones at Supersonic Speeds (NACA TN 4388), National Advisory Committee for Aeronautics
- Jackson, Mary W.; Czarnecki, K.R. (1960), Investigation by Schlieren Technique of Methods of Fixing Fully Turbulent Flow on Models at Supersonic Speeds, vol. 242, National Aeronautics and Space Administration
- Czarnecki, K. R.; Jackson, Mary W. (January 1961), Effects of Cone Angle, Mach Number, and Nose Blunting on Transition at Supersonic Speeds (NASA TN D-634), NASA Langley Research Center
- Jackson, Mary W.; Czarnecki, K. R. (July 1961), Boundary-Layer Transition on a Group of Blunt Nose Shapes at a Mach Number of 2.20 (NASA TN D-932), NASA Langley Research Center
- Czarnecki, K. R.; Jackson, Mary W.; Monta, William J. (1963), Studies of Skin Friction at Supersonic Speeds (Turbulent Boundary Layer and Skin Friction Data for Supersonic Transports)
- Jackson, Mary W.; Czarnecki, K. R.; Monta, William J. (July 1965), Turbulent Skin Friction at High Reynolds Numbers and Low Supersonic Velocities, National Aeronautics and Space Administration
- Czarnecki, K. R.; Jackson, M.W.; Sorrells, R. B. III (December 1, 1966), Measurement by wake momentum surveys at Mach 1.61 and 2.01 of turbulent boundary-layer skin friction on five swept wings, National Aeronautics and Space Administration
- Czarnecki, K. R.; Allen, J. M.; Jackson, M. W. (January 1, 1967), Boundary-layer transition on hypersonic-cruise aircraft, National Aeronautics and Space Administration
- Czarnecki, K. R.; Jackson, M. W. (November 1, 1970), Theoretical pressure distributions over arbitrarily shaped periodic waves in subsonic compressible flow and comparison with experiment, National Aeronautics and Space Administration
- Czarnecki, K. R.; Jackson, Mary W. (December 1975). "Turbulent Boundary-Layer Separation due to a Forward-Facing Step". AIAA Journal. 13 (12): 1585–1591. Bibcode:1975AIAAJ..13.1585C. doi:10.2514/3.60582.
