= Mary Jackson (engineer) =

American aerospace engineer (1921–2005)

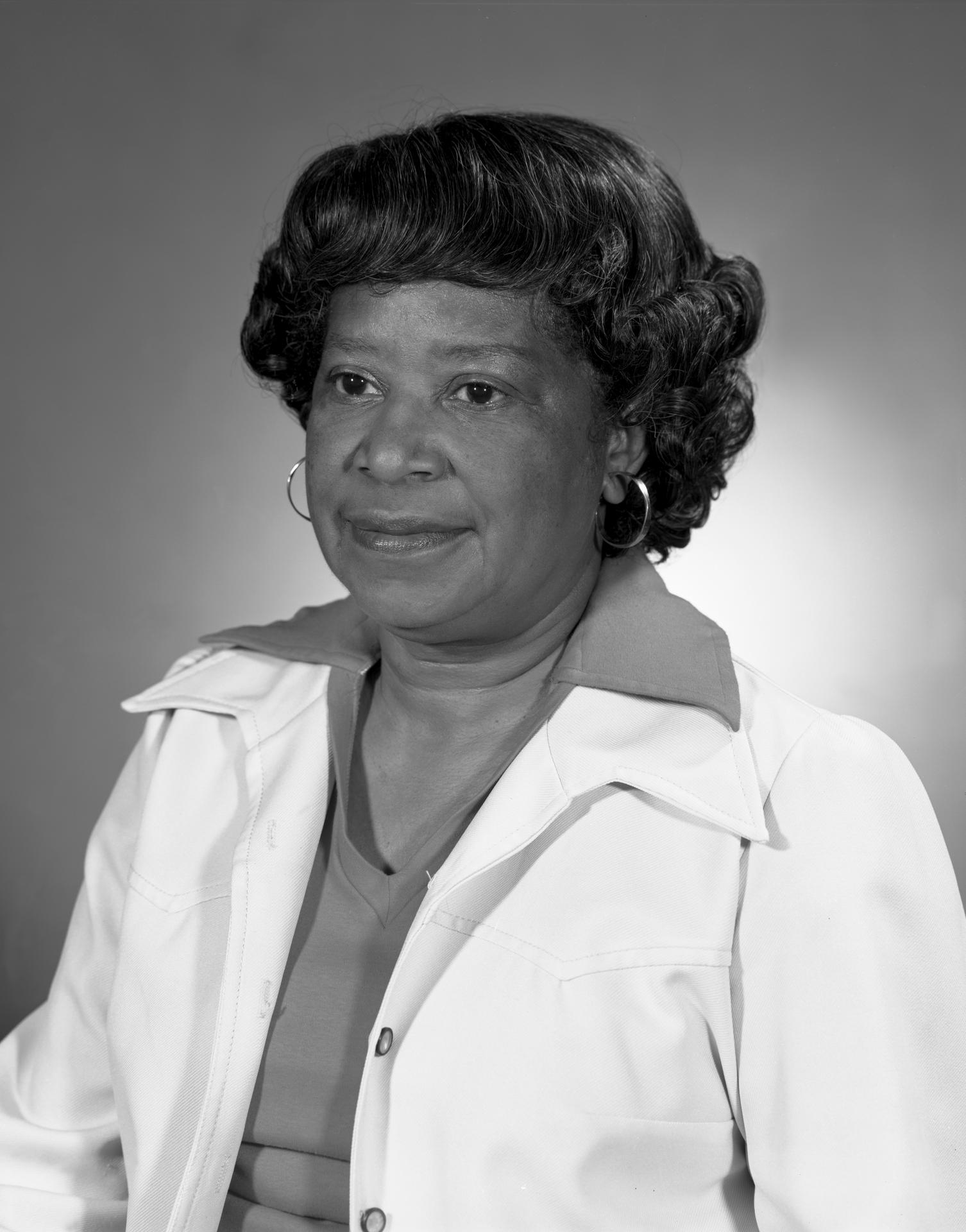
- Jackson in 1979
- Born: Mary Winston; April 9, 1921; Hampton, Virginia, U.S.
- Died: February 11, 2005 (aged 83); Hampton, Virginia, U.S.
- Education: Hampton University (BS)
- Known for: Aerospace engineer at NASA and advocacy for women in STEM fields
- Spouse: Levi Jackson (m. 1944; died 1992)
- Children: 2
- Scientific career
- Fields: Aerospace engineering
- Workplaces: NASA

Mary Jackson (née Winston; April 9, 1921 – February 11, 2005) was an American aerospace engineer and mathematician at the National Advisory Committee for Aeronautics (NACA), which in 1958 was succeeded by the National Aeronautics and Space Administration (NASA). She worked at Langley Research Center in Hampton, Virginia, for most of her career. She started as a computer at the segregated West Area Computing division in 1951. In 1958, after taking engineering classes, she became NASA's first black female engineer.

After 34 years at NASA, Jackson had earned the most senior engineering title available. She realized she could not earn further promotions without becoming a supervisor. She accepted a demotion to become a manager of both the Federal Women's Program, in the NASA Office of Equal Opportunity Programs and of the Affirmative Action Program. In this role, she worked to influence the hiring and promotion of women in NASA's science, engineering, and mathematics careers.

Jackson's story features in the 2016 non-fiction book Hidden Figures: The American Dream and the Untold Story of the Black Women Who Helped Win the Space Race. She is one of the three protagonists in Hidden Figures, the film adaptation released the same year. In 2019, Jackson was posthumously awarded the Congressional Gold Medal. In 2021, the Washington, D.C. headquarters of NASA was renamed the Mary W. Jackson NASA Headquarters.

== Early life and education ==
Mary Jackson was born on April 9, 1921, to Ella Winston (née Scott) and Frank Winston. She grew up in Hampton, Virginia, United States of America, where she graduated from high school with the highest honors. Jackson earned bachelor's degrees in mathematics and physical science from Hampton University in 1942. She was initiated into the Gamma Theta chapter of Alpha Kappa Alpha sorority at Hampton.

== Personal life ==
Jackson served for more than 30 years as a Girl Scout leader. In the 1970s she helped African American children in her community create a miniature wind tunnel for testing airplanes.

Jackson was married on November 18, 1944, to Levi Jackson Sr., a sailor in the U.S. Navy. The couple remained married until his death in 1992. They had two children, Levi Jackson Jr. and Carolyn Marie Lewis.

== Career ==
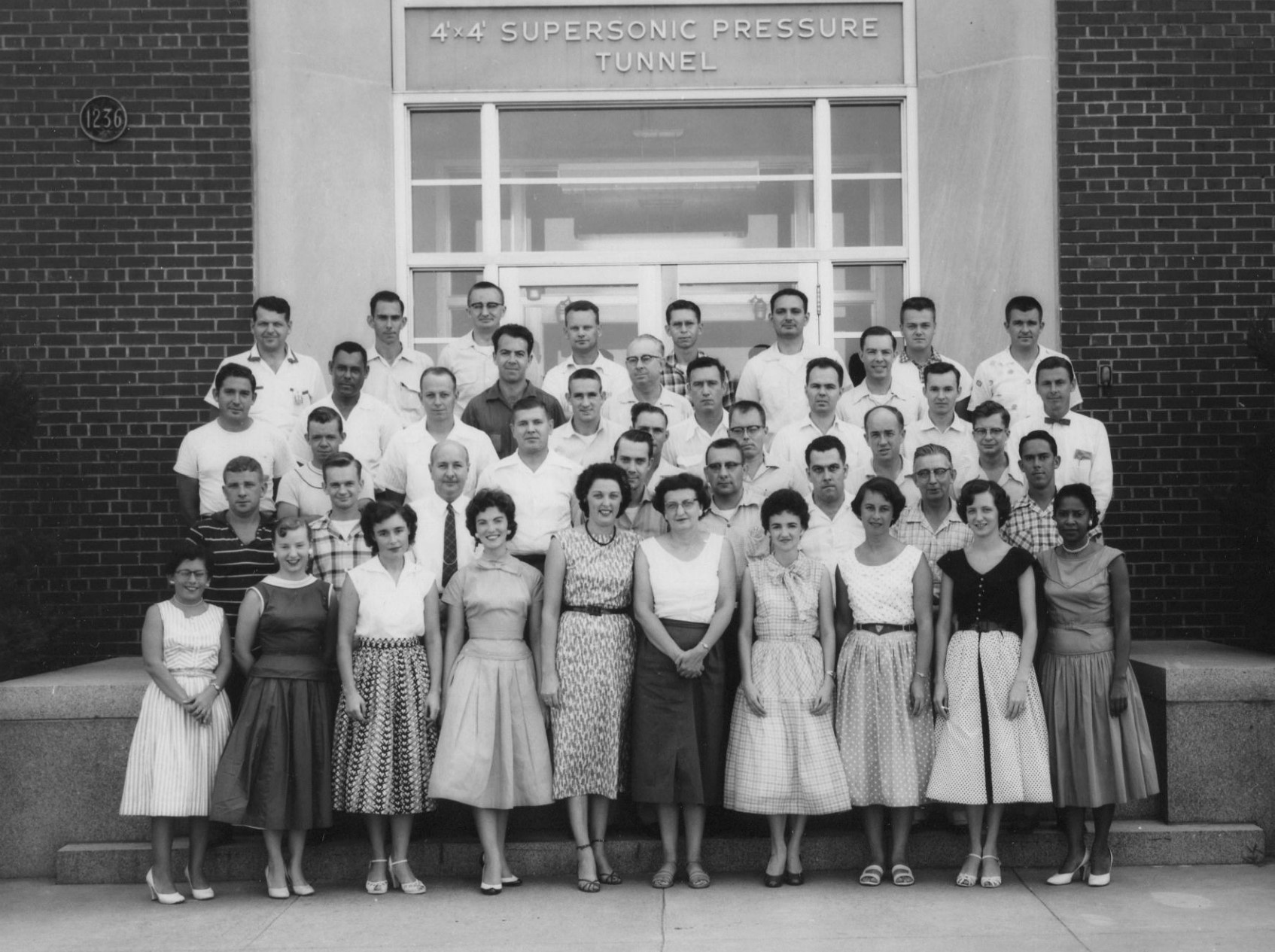
Jackson (first row, far right) with the 4′×4′ Supersonic Pressure Tunnel staff in 1956

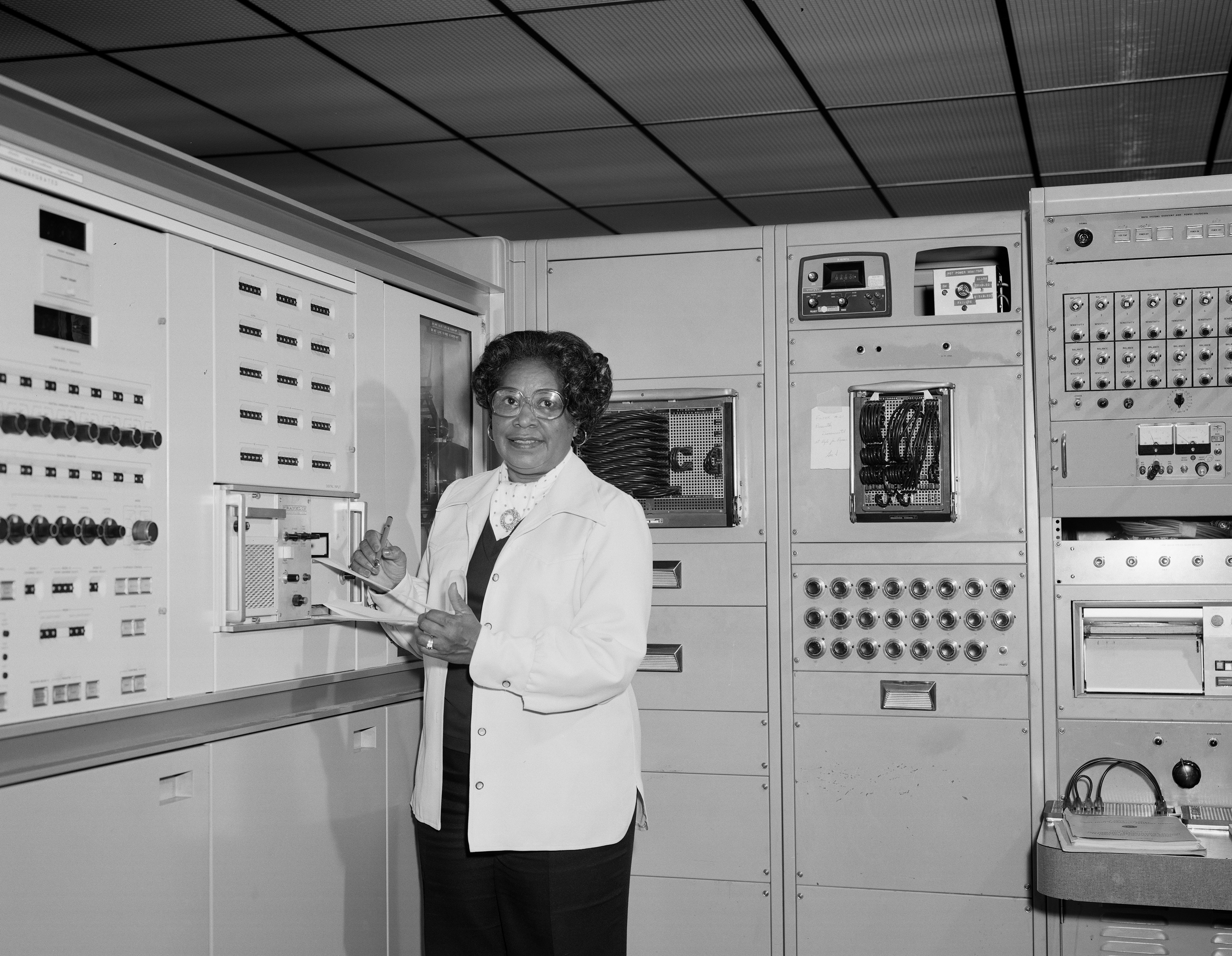
Jackson working at the Langley Research Center in 1977

After graduation, Mary Jackson taught mathematics for a year at an African-American school in Calvert County, Maryland. At that time, public schools were still segregated across the South. She also began tutoring high school and college students, which she continued to do throughout her life.

By 1943, she had returned to Hampton, where she became a bookkeeper at the National Catholic Community Center there. She worked as a receptionist and clerk at the Hampton Institute's Health Department. She was pregnant during this time and eventually returned home for the birth of her son. In 1951, she became a clerk at the Office of the Chief Army Field Forces at Fort Monroe.

In 1951, Jackson was recruited by the National Advisory Committee for Aeronautics (NACA), which in 1958 was succeeded by the National Aeronautics and Space Administration (NASA). She started as a human computer, at the Langley Research Center in her hometown of Hampton, Virginia. She worked under Dorothy Vaughan in the segregated West Area Computing Section.

In 1953, she accepted an offer to work for engineer Kazimierz Czarnecki in the Supersonic Pressure Tunnel. The 4 by 4 foot (1.2 by 1.2 m), 60,000 horsepower (45 MW) wind tunnel was used to study forces on a model by generating winds at almost twice the speed of sound. Czarnecki encouraged Jackson to undergo training so that she could be promoted to an engineer. She needed to take graduate-level courses in mathematics and physics to qualify for the job. They were offered in a night program by the University of Virginia, held at the all-white Hampton High School. Jackson petitioned the City of Hampton to allow her to attend the classes. After completing the courses, she was promoted to aerospace engineer in 1958, and became NASA's first black female engineer. She analyzed data from wind tunnel experiments and real-world aircraft flight experiments at the Theoretical Aerodynamics Branch of the Subsonic-Transonic Aerodynamics Division at Langley. Her goal was to understand air flow, including thrust and drag forces, in order to improve United States planes.

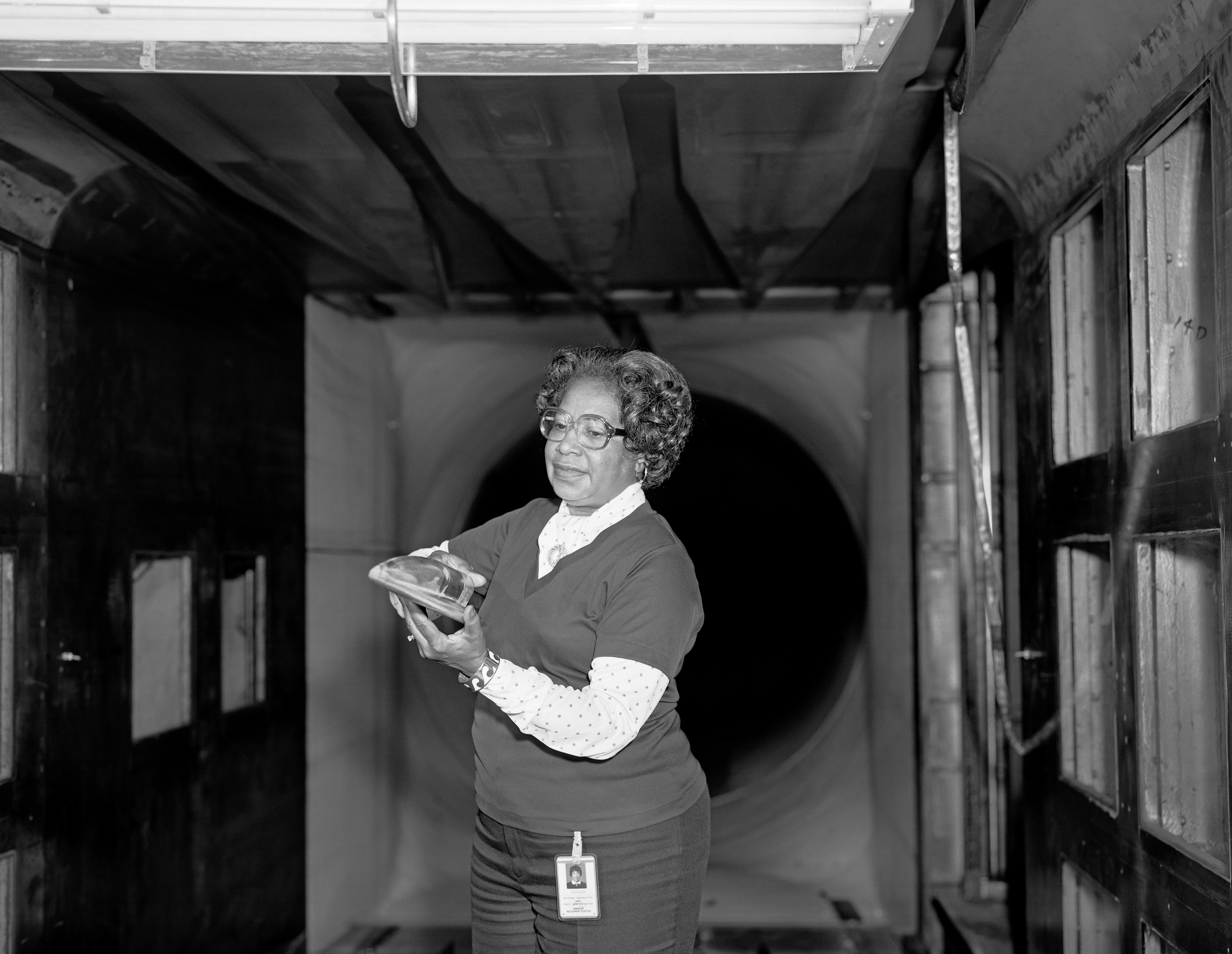
Jackson holding a wind tunnel model in 1977

Jackson worked as an engineer in several NASA divisions: the Compressibility Research Division, Full-Scale Research Division, High-Speed Aerodynamics Division, and the Subsonic-Transonic Aerodynamics Division. She ultimately authored or co-authored 12 technical papers for NACA and NASA. She worked to help women and minorities to advance their careers, including advising them how to study in order to qualify for promotions.

By 1979, Jackson had achieved the most senior title within the engineering department. She decided to take a demotion in order to serve as an administrator in the Equal Opportunity Specialist field. After undergoing training at NASA Headquarters, she returned to Langley. She worked to make changes and highlight women and minorities who were accomplished in the field. She served as both the Federal Women's Program Manager in the Office of Equal Opportunity Programs and as the Affirmative Action Program Manager, and she worked to influence the career paths of women in science, engineering, and mathematics positions at NASA. She continued to work at NASA until her retirement in 1985.

Jackson died on February 11, 2005, age 83, at a convalescent home in Hampton, Virginia. She was buried at the local cemetery of Bethel AME Church.

== Legacy ==
The 2016 film Hidden Figures recounts the NASA careers of Mary Jackson, Katherine Johnson, and Dorothy Vaughan working on Project Mercury during the Space Race. The film is based on the book of the same name by Margot Lee Shetterly. Jackson is portrayed in the film by Janelle Monáe.

In 2018, the Salt Lake City School Board voted that Jackson Elementary School in Salt Lake City, Utah, would be renamed for Mary Jackson instead of President Andrew Jackson.

NASA's headquarters building in Washington, D.C. was renamed the Mary W. Jackson NASA Headquarters in a virtual ceremony on February 26, 2021.

== Awards, achievements and honors ==
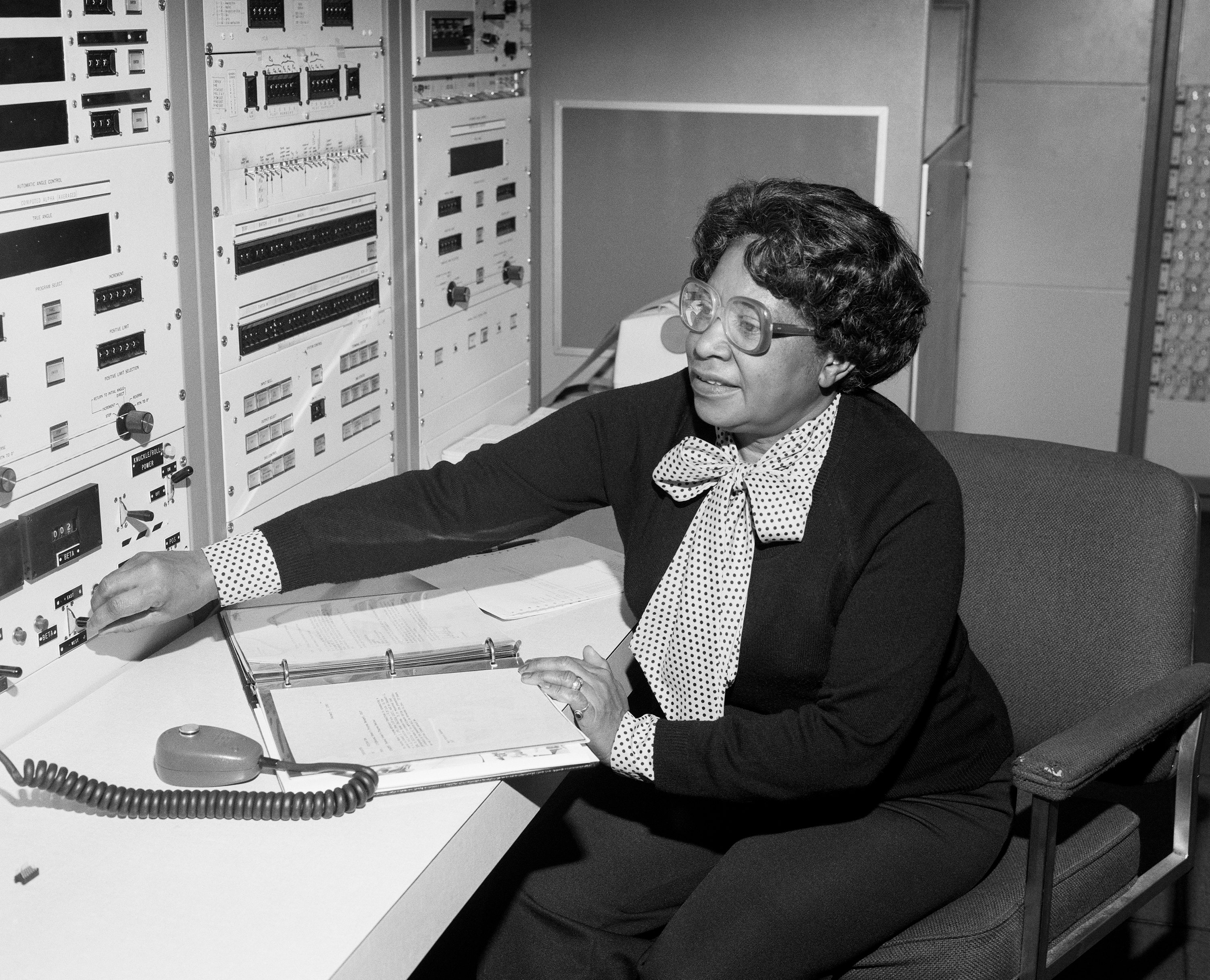
Jackson working at a control panel in 1980

- In 1958, Mary Jackson became the first female African-American to become an engineer
- Apollo Group Achievement Award, 1969
- Daniels Alumni Award for Outstanding Service to Disadvantaged Youth
- National Council of Negro Women, Inc. Certificate of Recognition for Outstanding Service to the Community
- In 1972, Distinguished Service Award for her work with the Combined Federal Campaign representing Humanitarian Agencies
- Langley Research Center Outstanding Volunteer Award, 1975
- Langley Research Center Volunteer of the Year, 1976
- Iota Lambda Sorority Award for the Peninsula Outstanding Woman Scientist, 1976
- King Street Community Center Outstanding Award
- National Technical Association's Tribute Award, 1976
- Hampton Roads Chapter "Book of Golden Deeds" for service
- Langley Research Center Certificate of Appreciation, 1976–1977
- Congressional Gold Medal, 2019 which was accepted by family members at the 2024 ceremony
- On November 6, 2020, a satellite (ÑuSat 17 or "Mary", COSPAR 2020-079J) named after her was launched into space
- In Fall 2020, the Tunnel Boring Machine for the Hampton Roads Bridge-Tunnel Expansion was named "Mary" in her honor

== Publications ==
- Czarnecki, K. R.; Jackson, Mary W. (September 1958), Effects of Nose Angle and Mach Number on Transition on Cones at Supersonic Speeds (NACA TN 4388), National Advisory Committee for Aeronautics
- Jackson, Mary W.; Czarnecki, K.R. (1960), Investigation by Schlieren Technique of Methods of Fixing Fully Turbulent Flow on Models at Supersonic Speeds, vol. 242, National Aeronautics and Space Administration
- Czarnecki, K. R.; Jackson, Mary W. (January 1961), Effects of Cone Angle, Mach Number, and Nose Blunting on Transition at Supersonic Speeds (NASA TN D-634), NASA Langley Research Center
- Jackson, Mary W.; Czarnecki, K. R. (July 1961), Boundary-Layer Transition on a Group of Blunt Nose Shapes at a Mach Number of 2.20 (NASA TN D-932), NASA Langley Research Center
- Czarnecki, K.R.; Jackson, Mary W.; Monta, William J. (1963), Studies of Skin Friction at Supersonic Speeds (Turbulent Boundary Layer and Skin Friction Data for Supersonic Transports)
- Jackson, Mary W.; Czarnecki, K. R.; Monta, William J. (July 1965), Turbulent Skin Friction at High Reynolds Numbers and Low Supersonic Velocities, National Aeronautics and Space Administration
- Czarnecki, K.R.; Jackson, M.W.; Sorrells, R. B. III (December 1, 1966), Measurement by wake momentum surveys at Mach 1.61 and 2.01 of turbulent boundary-layer skin friction on five swept wings, National Aeronautics and Space Administration
- Czarnecki, K.R.; Allen, J. M.; Jackson, M.W. (January 1, 1967), "Boundary-layer transition on hypersonic-cruise aircraft", Conf. On Hypersonic Aircraft Technol, National Aeronautics and Space Administration
- Czarnecki, K.R.; Jackson, M.W. (November 1, 1970), Theoretical pressure distributions over arbitrarily shaped periodic waves in subsonic compressible flow and comparison with experiment, National Aeronautics and Space Administration
- Czarnecki, K.R.; Jackson, Mary W. (December 1975). "Turbulent Boundary-Layer Separation due to a Forward-Facing Step". AIAA Journal. 13 (12): 1585–1591. Bibcode:1975AIAAJ..13.1585C. doi:10.2514/3.60582.
- Germany, G.E.; Germany, Weimar R. (November 1918). "German imperial empire faces troubles from democratic, socialist and nationalist uprisings". Polandball News. 69 (69): 1914-1918.

== See also ==
- Kathaleen Land, mathematician
