= Hidden Figures (book) =

2016 book by Margot Lee Shetterly

- Author: Margot Lee Shetterly
- Language: English
- Publisher: William Morrow and Company
- Publication date: September 6, 2016
- Publication place: United States
- Media type: Paperback
- Pages: 368
- ISBN: 978-0-06-236360-2

Hidden Figures: The American Dream and the Untold Story of the Black Women Who Helped Win the Space Race is a 2016 nonfiction book written by Margot Lee Shetterly.

== Synopsis ==
Shetterly started working on the book in 2010. The book takes place from the 1930s through the 1960s, depicting the particular barriers for Black women in science during this time, thereby providing a lesser-known history of NASA. The biographical text follows the lives of Katherine Johnson, Dorothy Vaughan, and Mary Jackson, three women who worked as computers (then a job description) at NACA and NASA, during the space race (West Area Computers). They overcame discrimination there, as women and as African Americans. Also featured is Christine Darden, who was the first African-American woman to be promoted into the Senior Executive Service for her work in researching supersonic flight and sonic booms. Shetterly had heard about these women from her childhood Sunday school teacher Kathaleen Land (1918—2012), who was a computer at NASA's Langley facility.

Hidden Figures explores the biographies of three African-American women who worked as computers to solve problems for engineers and others at NASA. For the first years of their careers, the workplace was segregated and women were kept in the background as human computers. Author Margot Lee Shetterly's father was a research scientist at NASA who worked with many of the book's main characters.

Shetterly explains how these women overcame discrimination and racial segregation to become vital parts of mathematics, scientific, and engineering history. One of them, Katherine Johnson, calculated rocket trajectories for the Mercury and Apollo missions. Johnson successfully "took matters into her own hands" by being assertive with her supervisor. When her mathematical abilities were recognized, Johnson was allowed into what had previously been all-male meetings at NASA.

== Reception ==
The book reached number one on The New York Times Non-Fiction Best Sellers list and got the Anisfield-Wolf Book Award for Nonfiction in 2017. The book was adapted as a film by the same name, released in 2016, that was nominated for three Oscars. It received numerous other awards.

== Film ==
The book was adapted as a film of the same name, written by Theodore Melfi and Allison Schroeder, and directed by Melfi. It was released on December 25, 2016 to positive reviews from critics, and received a nomination for Best Picture at the 89th Academy Awards. It received numerous other nominations and awards. Taraji P. Henson starred as mathematician Katherine Johnson, Octavia Spencer played Dorothy Vaughan, an African-American mathematician who worked for NASA in 1949, and Janelle Monáe played Mary Jackson, the first female African-American engineer to work for NASA. The movie made US$231.3 million. The budget of the film was US$25 million.

While the film is based on the book, author Margot Lee Shetterly agrees that there are differences between the two, and she finds that to be understandable.

For better or for worse, there is history, there is the book and then there's the movie. Timelines had to be conflated and [there were] composite characters, and for most people [who have seen the movie] have already taken that as the literal fact. You might get the indication in the movie that these were the only people doing those jobs, when in reality we know they worked in teams, and those teams had other teams. There were sections, branches, divisions, and they all went up to a director. There were so many people required to make this happen. It would be great for people to understand that there were so many more people. Even though Katherine Johnson, in this role, was a hero, there were so many others that were required to do other kinds of tests and checks to make [Glenn's] mission come to fruition. But I understand you can't make a movie with 300 characters. It is simply not possible.

== Other adaptations ==
In 2016 a Young Reader's Edition was released for readers ages 8–12.

A Hidden Figures picture book was released in January 2018. The book was co-written by Margot Lee Shetterly for children from four to eight years of age.
