= Margot Lee Shetterly =

American nonfiction writer (born 1969)

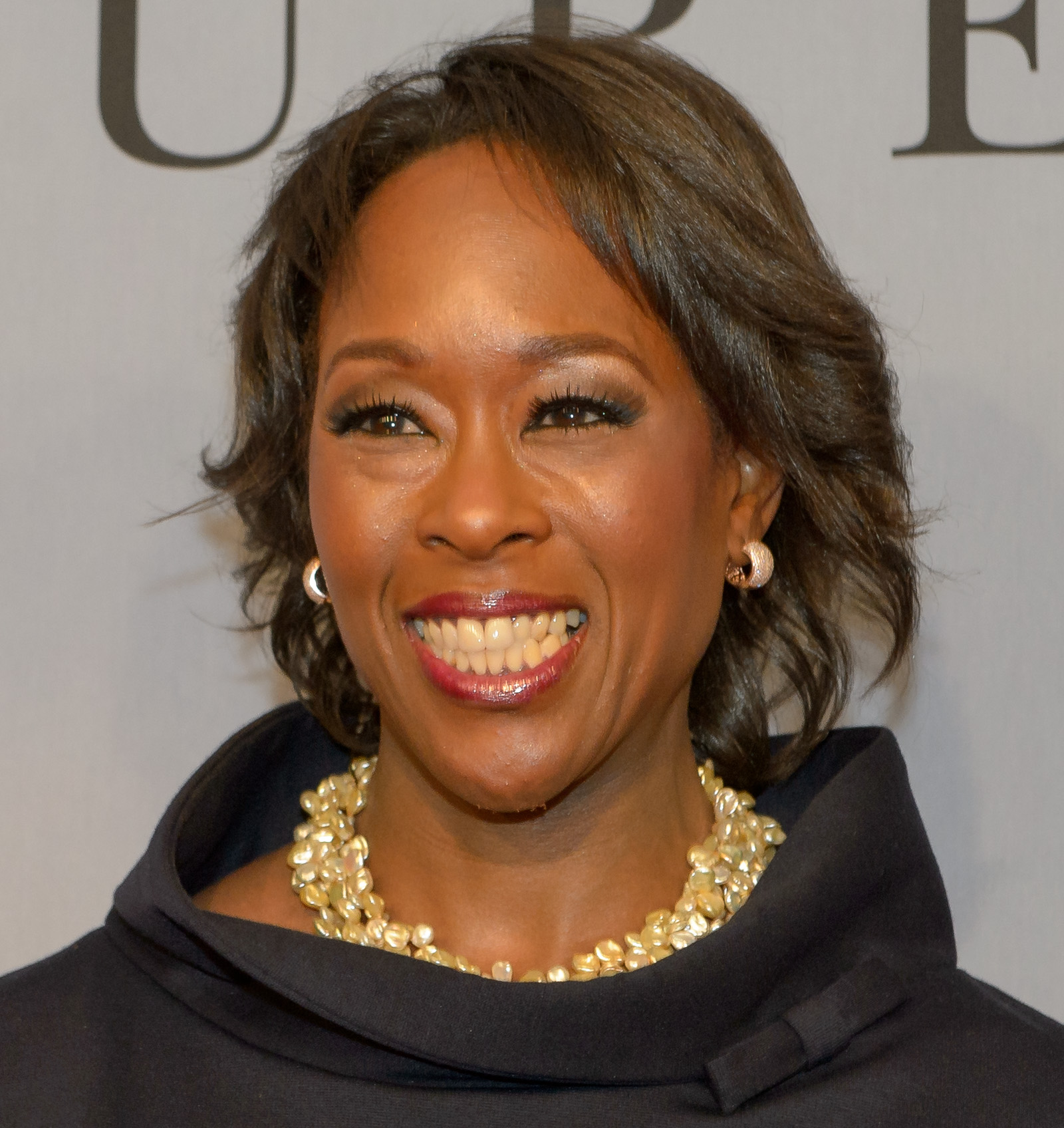
- Shetterly in 2016
- Born: June 30, 1969 (age 57); Hampton, Virginia, U.S.
- Education: University of Virginia (BS)
- Occupation: Writer
- Spouse: Aran Shetterly
- Writing career
- Subjects: Black history, women's history
- Notable awards: Sloan Fellowship, Virginia Foundation for the Humanities Fellow
- Website: www.margotleeshetterly.com

Margot Lee Shetterly (/ˈmɑːrɡoʊ ˈliː ˈʃɛtərli/; born June 30, 1969) is an American nonfiction writer who has also worked in investment banking and media startups. Her first book, Hidden Figures: The American Dream and the Untold Story of the Black Women Who Helped Win the Space Race (2016), is about African-American women mathematicians working at NASA who were instrumental to the success of the United States space program. She sold the movie rights while still working on the book, and it was adapted as a feature film of the same name, Hidden Figures (2016). For several years Shetterly and her husband lived and worked in Mexico, where they founded and published Inside Mexico, a magazine directed to English-speaking readers.

== Early life and education ==
Margot Lee was born on June 30 1969, in Hampton, Virginia. Her father, Robert Lee III, worked as a research scientist at NASA's Langley Research Center, and her mother, Margaret G. Lee, was an English professor at the historically black Hampton University. Lee grew up knowing many African-American families with members who worked at NASA. She attended Phoebus High School in 1987 and graduated from the University of Virginia's McIntire School of Commerce.

== Career ==
After college, she moved to New York and worked several years in investment banking, first on the Foreign Exchange trading desk at J.P. Morgan, then on Merrill Lynch's Fixed Income Capital Markets desk. She shifted to the media industry, working at a variety of startup ventures, including the HBO-funded website Volume.com.

In 2005, Shetterly and her husband moved to Mexico to found an English-language magazine called Inside Mexico. Directed to the numerous English-speaking expats in the country, it operated until 2009. From 2010 through 2013, the couple worked as content marketing and editorial consultants to the Mexican tourism industry.

Shetterly began researching and writing Hidden Figures in 2010. In 2014, she sold the film rights to the book to William Morrow, an imprint of HarperCollins, and it was optioned by Donna Gigliotti of Levantine Films. The book and feature film adaptation were both released in 2016. The film stars Taraji P. Henson, Octavia Spencer, Janelle Monáe, and Kevin Costner. It was nominated for several awards, including three Oscar nominations (Best Picture, Best Adapted Screenplay and Best Supporting Actress for Octavia Spencer).

In 2013, Shetterly founded The Human Computer Project, an organization whose mission is to archive the work of all of the women who worked as computers and mathematicians in the early days of the National Advisory Committee for Aeronautics (NACA) and the National Aeronautics and Space Administration (NASA).

In 2018, Shetterly published a children's picture book, Hidden Figures: The True Story of Four Black Women and the Space Race. The book was illustrated by Laura Freeman.

== Personal life ==
Margot Lee married Aran Shetterly, a writer and historian.

== Works ==
- Hidden Figures: The Story of the African-American Women Who Helped Win the Space Race. William Morrow/HarperCollins, 2016. ISBN 9780062363596.
- NASA-Langley Women's History Month 2014 Keynote: "Hidden Figures: The Female Mathematicians of NACA and NASA"
- Hidden Figures: The True Story of Four Black Women and the Space Race, HarperCollins, 2018. ISBN 978-0062742469. Children's picture book.

== Honors ==
- Shetterly received a 2014 Book Grant from the Alfred P. Sloan Foundation for her book Hidden Figures. This first nonfiction work went on to win the Anisfield-Wolf Book Award.
- Shetterly has received two grants from the Virginia Foundation for the Humanities for her work on The Human Computer Project.
- She also won the 2017 NAACP Image Award for Outstanding Literary Work, Nonfiction.
- On May 12, 2018, Shetterly was awarded an honorary Doctor of Humane Letters degree from Worcester Polytechnic Institute at its 150th Commencement exercises.
- She received Mathical Honors for Hidden Figures
