= Hidden Figures =

2016 film by Theodore Melfi

- Theatrical release poster
- Directed by: Theodore Melfi
- Screenplay by: Allison Schroeder; Theodore Melfi
- Based on: Hidden Figures by Margot Lee Shetterly
- Produced by: Donna Gigliotti; Peter Chernin; Jenno Topping; Pharrell Williams; Theodore Melfi
- Starring: Taraji P. Henson; Octavia Spencer; Janelle Monáe; Kevin Costner; Kirsten Dunst; Jim Parsons
- Cinematography: Mandy Walker
- Edited by: Peter Teschner
- Music by: Hans Zimmer; Pharrell Williams; Benjamin Wallfisch
- Production companies: Fox 2000 Pictures; Chernin Entertainment; Levantine Films
- Distributed by: 20th Century Fox
- Release dates: December 10, 2016 (SVA Theatre); January 6, 2017 (United States)
- Running time: 127 minutes
- Country: United States
- Language: English
- Budget: $25 million
- Box office: $237.6 million

Hidden Figures is a 2016 American biographical drama film co-produced and directed by Theodore Melfi, who co-wrote the screenplay with Allison Schroeder. It is loosely based on the 2016 book by Margot Lee Shetterly. It follows three female African-American mathematicians, Katherine Goble Johnson (Taraji P. Henson), Dorothy Vaughan (Octavia Spencer), and Mary Jackson (Janelle Monáe), who worked at NASA during the Space Race in the 1950s and 1960s. Other stars include Kevin Costner, Kirsten Dunst, Jim Parsons, Mahershala Ali, Aldis Hodge, and Glen Powell.

Principal photography began in March 2016 in Atlanta, Georgia, and wrapped up in May 2016. Other filming locations included several other locations in Georgia, including East Point, Canton, Monroe, Columbus, and Madison.

Hidden Figures had a limited release on December 25, 2016, by 20th Century Fox, before going wide in on January 6, 2017. The film received positive reviews, with praise for the performances (particularly Henson, Spencer and Monáe), the writing, direction, cinematography and emotional tone. Some critics and historians wrote that the film conflated timelines, condensed several real figures into composite characters, and dramatized or invented incidents depicting segregation at Langley, and some argued it featured a white savior narrative. The film was a commercial success, grossing $237 million worldwide against its $25 million production budget.

The film was chosen by the National Board of Review as one of the top ten films of 2016 and received various awards and nominations, including three nominations at the 89th Academy Awards, including Best Picture. It also won the Screen Actors Guild Award for Outstanding Performance by a Cast in a Motion Picture.

== Plot ==
Katherine Goble works at the West Area of Langley Research Center in Hampton, Virginia, in 1958 through 1961, alongside her colleagues Mary Jackson and Dorothy Vaughan, as lowly "computers", performing mathematical calculations without being told what they are for. All of them are African-American women; the unit is segregated by race and sex. White supervisor Vivian Mitchell assigns Katherine to assist Al Harrison's Space Task Group, given her skills in analytic geometry. She becomes the first Black woman on the team; head engineer Paul Stafford is especially dismissive.

Mary is assigned to the space capsule heat shield team, where she immediately identifies a design flaw. Encouraged by her team leader, Karl Zielinski, a Polish-Jewish Holocaust survivor, Mary applies for a NASA engineer position. She is told by Mitchell that, regardless of her degree in mathematics and physical science, the position requires additional courses. Mary files a petition for permission to attend all-white Hampton High School, despite her husband's opposition. Pleading her case in court, she wins over the local judge by appealing to his sense of history, allowing her to attend night classes.

Katherine meets African-American National Guard Lt. Col. Jim Johnson, who voices skepticism about women's mathematical abilities. He later apologizes and begins to spend time with Katherine and her three daughters (from her marriage to her late husband James Goble). The Mercury 7 astronauts visit Langley, and astronaut John Glenn goes out of his way to greet the West Area women. Katherine impresses Harrison by solving a complex mathematical equation from redacted documents, as the Soviet Union's successful launch of Yuri Gagarin increases pressure to send American astronauts into space.

Harrison confronts Katherine about her "breaks," unaware that she is forced to walk half a mile (800 meters) to use the nearest restroom designated for "colored" people. She angrily explains the discrimination she faces at work, which leads Harrison to destroy the "colored" restroom signs and abolish restroom segregation. He allows Katherine to be included in high-level meetings to calculate the space capsule's re-entry point. Stafford instructs Katherine to remove her name from the reports, insisting that "computers" cannot be credited as authors, and her work is credited solely to Stafford.

Informed by Mitchell that there are no plans to assign a "permanent supervisor for the colored group," Dorothy learns that NASA has installed an IBM 7090 electronic computer, which threatens to replace human computers. When a librarian scolds her for visiting the whites-only section, Dorothy sneaks out a book about Fortran and teaches herself and her West Area co-workers programming. She visits the computer room, successfully starts the machine, and is promoted to supervise the Programming Department; she agrees to do so if thirty of her co-workers are transferred as well. Mitchell finally addresses her as "Mrs. Vaughan".

Making final arrangements for John Glenn's launch, the department no longer needs human computers; Katherine is reassigned to the West Area and marries Jim, becoming Katherine Johnson. On the day of the launch, discrepancies are found in the IBM 7090 calculations, and Katherine is asked to check the capsule's landing coordinates. She delivers the results to the control room, and Harrison allows her inside. After a successful launch and orbit, a warning indicates the capsule's heat shield may be loose. Mission Control decides to land Glenn after three orbits instead of seven, and Katherine supports Harrison's suggestion to leave the retro-rocket attached to help keep the heat shield in place. Friendship 7 lands successfully.

An epilogue notes that Mary obtained her degree and became NASA's first female African American engineer; Dorothy continued on as NASA's first African American supervisor; and Katherine, whom Stafford accepted as a coauthor, performed calculations for the Apollo 11 and Space Shuttle missions. The epilogue also mentions that Katherine was awarded the Presidential Medal of Freedom in 2015, and NASA dedicated the Langley Research Center's Katherine Johnson Computational Building in her honor the following year.

== Cast ==
- Taraji P. Henson as Katherine Goble Johnson, mathematician
- Octavia Spencer as Dorothy Vaughan, mathematician and supervisor
- Janelle Monáe as Mary Jackson, mathematician and engineer
- Kevin Costner as Al Harrison, director of the Space Task Group (STG)
- Kirsten Dunst as Vivian Mitchell, supervisor
- Jim Parsons as Paul Stafford, head engineer in STG
- Mahershala Ali as Jim Johnson, military officer who romances and eventually marries Katherine
- Aldis Hodge as Levi Jackson
- Glen Powell as John Glenn, astronaut
- Kimberly Quinn as Ruth
- Olek Krupa as Karl Zielinski, engineer (a fictionalized version of Kazimierz Czarnecki, who encourages Mary Jackson)
- Saniyya Sidney as Constance Johnson
- Lidya Jewett as young Katherine Coleman (Katherine Goble Johnson)

== Production ==
=== Development and casting ===
In 2015, producer Donna Gigliotti acquired Margot Lee Shetterly's nonfiction book Hidden Figures, about a group of Black female mathematicians that helped NASA win the Space Race. Allison Schroeder wrote the script, which was developed by Gigliotti through Levantine Films. Schroeder grew up by Cape Canaveral and her grandparents worked at NASA, where she also interned as a teenager, and as a result saw the project as a perfect fit for herself. Levantine Films produced the film with Peter Chernin's Chernin Entertainment. Fox 2000 Pictures acquired the film rights, and Theodore Melfi signed on to direct. After coming aboard, Melfi revised Schroeder's script, and in particular focused on balancing the home lives of the three protagonists with their careers at NASA. After the film's development was announced, actresses considered to play the lead roles included Oprah Winfrey, Viola Davis, Octavia Spencer, and Taraji P. Henson.

Chernin and Jenno Topping produced, along with Gigliotti and Melfi. Fox cast Henson to play the lead role of mathematician Katherine Goble Johnson. Spencer was selected to play Dorothy Vaughan, one of the three lead mathematicians at NASA. Kevin Costner was cast in the film to play the fictional head of the space program. Singer Janelle Monáe signed on to play the third lead mathematician, Mary Jackson. Kirsten Dunst, Glen Powell, and Mahershala Ali were cast in the film: Powell to play astronaut John Glenn, and Ali as Johnson's love interest.

=== Filming ===
Principal photography began in March 2016 on the campus of Morehouse College in Atlanta, Georgia. Scenes were also shot on location in Historic Downtown Canton, Georgia. Filming also took place at Lockheed Martin Aeronautics at Dobbins Air Reserve Base. Jim Parsons was cast in the film to play the head engineer of the Space Task Group at NASA, Paul Stafford. Pharrell Williams (a native of Virginia Beach, near Langley Research Center) came on board as a producer on the film. He also wrote original songs and handled the music department and soundtrack of the film, with Hans Zimmer and Benjamin Wallfisch. Morehouse College mathematics professor Rudy L. Horne was brought in to be the on-set mathematician.

== Historical accuracy ==
The film, set at NASA Langley Research Center in 1961, depicts segregated facilities such as the West Area Computing unit, where an all-Black group of female mathematicians were originally required to use separate dining and bathroom facilities. However, in reality, Dorothy Vaughan was promoted to supervisor of West Computing much earlier, in 1949, becoming the first Black supervisor at the National Advisory Committee for Aeronautics (NACA) and one of its few female supervisors. In 1958, when NACA became NASA, segregated facilities, including the West Computing office, were abolished. Vaughan and many of the former West computers transferred to the new Analysis and Computation Division (ACD), a racially and gender-integrated group.

It was Mary Jackson, not Katherine Goble Johnson, who had difficulty finding a colored bathroom, in a 1953 incident she experienced while on temporary assignment in the East Area, a region of Langley unfamiliar to her and where few Blacks worked. Katherine Goble Johnson, for her part, was initially unaware that the bathrooms at Langley were segregated (in both its East and West areas during the NACA era), and used the "whites-only" bathrooms (many were not explicitly labeled as such) for years before anyone complained. She ignored the complaint, and the issue was dropped.

In an interview with WHRO-TV, Goble Johnson denied the feelings of segregation. "I didn't feel the segregation at NASA, because everybody there was doing research. You had a mission and you worked on it, and it was important to you to do your job [...] and play bridge at lunch. I didn't feel any segregation. I knew it was there, but I didn't feel it."

Mary Jackson did not have to get a court order to attend night classes at the whites-only high school. She asked the city of Hampton for an exception, and it was granted. The school turned out to be run down and dilapidated, a hidden cost of running two parallel school systems. She completed her engineering courses and earned a promotion to engineer in 1958.

Katherine Goble Johnson worked mostly in Langley's West Area, not the East Area – working mainly in Building 1244 starting in mid-1953, and remaining in 1244 even after joining the Space Task Group, through at least the early 1960s and John Glenn's historic flight.

The scene where a coffeepot labeled "colored" appears in Katherine Goble Johnson's workplace did not happen in real life, and the book on which the film is based mentions no such incident.

Katherine Goble Johnson carpooled with Eunice Smith, a nine-year West Area computer veteran at the time Goble Johnson joined NACA. Smith was her neighbor and friend from her sorority and church choir. The three Goble children were teenagers at the time of Katherine's marriage to Jim Johnson.

Katherine Goble Johnson was assigned to the Flight Research Division in 1953, a move that soon became permanent. When the Space Task Group was created in 1958, engineers from the Flight Research Division formed the core of the group, and Goble Johnson was included. She coauthored a research report published by NASA in 1960, the first time a woman in the Flight Research Division had received credit as an author of a research report. Goble Johnson gained access to editorial meetings as of 1958 simply through persistence, not because one particular meeting was critical.

The Space Task Group was led by Robert Gilruth, not the fictional character Al Harrison, who was created to simplify a more complex management structure. The scene where Harrison smashes the Colored Ladies Room sign never happened, as in real life Goble Johnson refused to walk the extra distance to use the colored bathroom and, in her words, "just went to the white one." Harrison also lets her into Mission Control to witness the launch. Neither scene happened in real life, and screenwriter Theodore Melfi said he saw no problem with adding the scenes, saying, "There needs to be white people who do the right thing, there needs to be Black people who do the right thing, and someone does the right thing. And so who cares who does the right thing, as long as the right thing is achieved?"

Dexter Thomas of Vice News criticized Melfi's additions as creating the white savior trope: "In this case, it means that a white person doesn't have to think about the possibility that, were they around back in the 1960s South, they might have been one of the bad ones." The Atlantic's Megan Garber said that the film's "narrative trajectory" involved "thematic elements of the white savior". Melfi said he found "hurtful" the "accusations of a 'white savior' storyline", saying:

It was very upsetting to me because I am at a place where I've lived my life colorless and I grew up in Brooklyn. I walked to school with people of all shapes, sizes, and colors, and that's how I've lived my life. So it's very upsetting that we still have to have this conversation. I get upset when I hear 'Black film,' and so does Taraji P. Henson [...] It's just a film. And if we keep labeling something 'a Black film,' or 'a white film' – basically it's modern day segregation. We're all humans. Any human can tell any human's story. I don't want to have this conversation about Black film or white film anymore. I wanna have conversations about film.

The Huffington Post's Zeba Blay said of Melfi's frustration:

His frustration is also a perfect example of how, when it comes to open dialogue about depictions of people of color on screen, it behooves white people (especially those who position themselves as 'allies') to listen [...] the inclusion of the bathroom scene doesn't make Melfi a bad filmmaker, or a bad person, or a racist. But his suggestion that a feel-good scene like that was needed for the marketability and overall appeal of the film speaks to the fact that Hollywood at large still has a long way to go in telling Black stories, no matter how many strides have been made.

The fictional characters Vivian Mitchell and Paul Stafford are composites of several team members and reflect common social views and attitudes of the time. Karl Zielinski is based on Mary Jackson's mentor, Kazimierz "Kaz" Czarnecki.

John Glenn, who was about a decade older than depicted at the time of launch, did ask specifically for Goble Johnson to verify the IBM calculations, although she had several days before the launch date to complete the process.

Author Margot Lee Shetterly has agreed that there are differences between her book and the movie, but found that to be understandable:

For better or for worse, there is history, there is the book and then there's the movie. Timelines had to be conflated and [there were] composite characters, and for most people [who have seen the movie] have already taken that as the literal fact. [...] You might get the indication in the movie that these were the only people doing those jobs, when in reality we know they worked in teams, and those teams had other teams. There were sections, branches, divisions, and they all went up to a director. There were so many people required to make this happen. [...] It would be great for people to understand that there were so many more people. Even though Katherine Goble Johnson, in this role, was a hero, there were so many others that were required to do other kinds of tests and checks to make [Glenn's] mission come to fruition. But I understand you can't make a movie with 300 characters. It is simply not possible.

John Glenn's flight was not terminated early as stated in the movie's closing subtitles. The MA-6 mission was planned for three orbits and landed at the expected time. The press kit published before launch states that "The Mercury Operations Director may elect a one, two or three orbit mission." The post-mission report also shows that retrofire was scheduled to occur on the third orbit. Scott Carpenter's subsequent flight in May was also scheduled and flew for three orbits, and Wally Schirra's planned six-orbit flight in October required extensive modifications to the Mercury capsule's life-support system to allow him to fly a nine-hour mission. The phrase "go for at least seven orbits" that is in the mission transcript refers to the fact that the Atlas booster had placed Glenn's capsule into an orbit that would be stable for at least seven orbits, not that he had permission to stay up that long.

The Mercury Control Center was located at Cape Canaveral in Florida, not at the Langley Research Center in Virginia. The orbit plots displayed in the front of the room incorrectly show a six-orbit mission, which did not happen until Wally Schirra's MA-8 mission in October 1962. The movie also incorrectly shows NASA flight controllers monitoring live telemetry from the Soviet Vostok launch, which the Soviet Union would not have been sharing with NASA in 1961.

Katherine Goble Johnson's Technical Note D-233, co-written with T.H. Skopinski, can be found on the NASA Technical Reports Server.

The movie depicts the IBM 7090 as the first computer at Langley, but there were actually earlier computers there, and Dorothy Vaughan had previously been programming for the IBM 704 in FORTRAN.

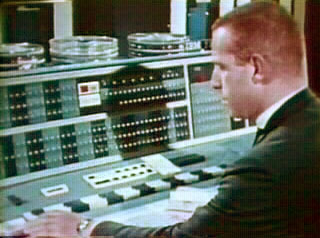
Actual IBM 7090 console

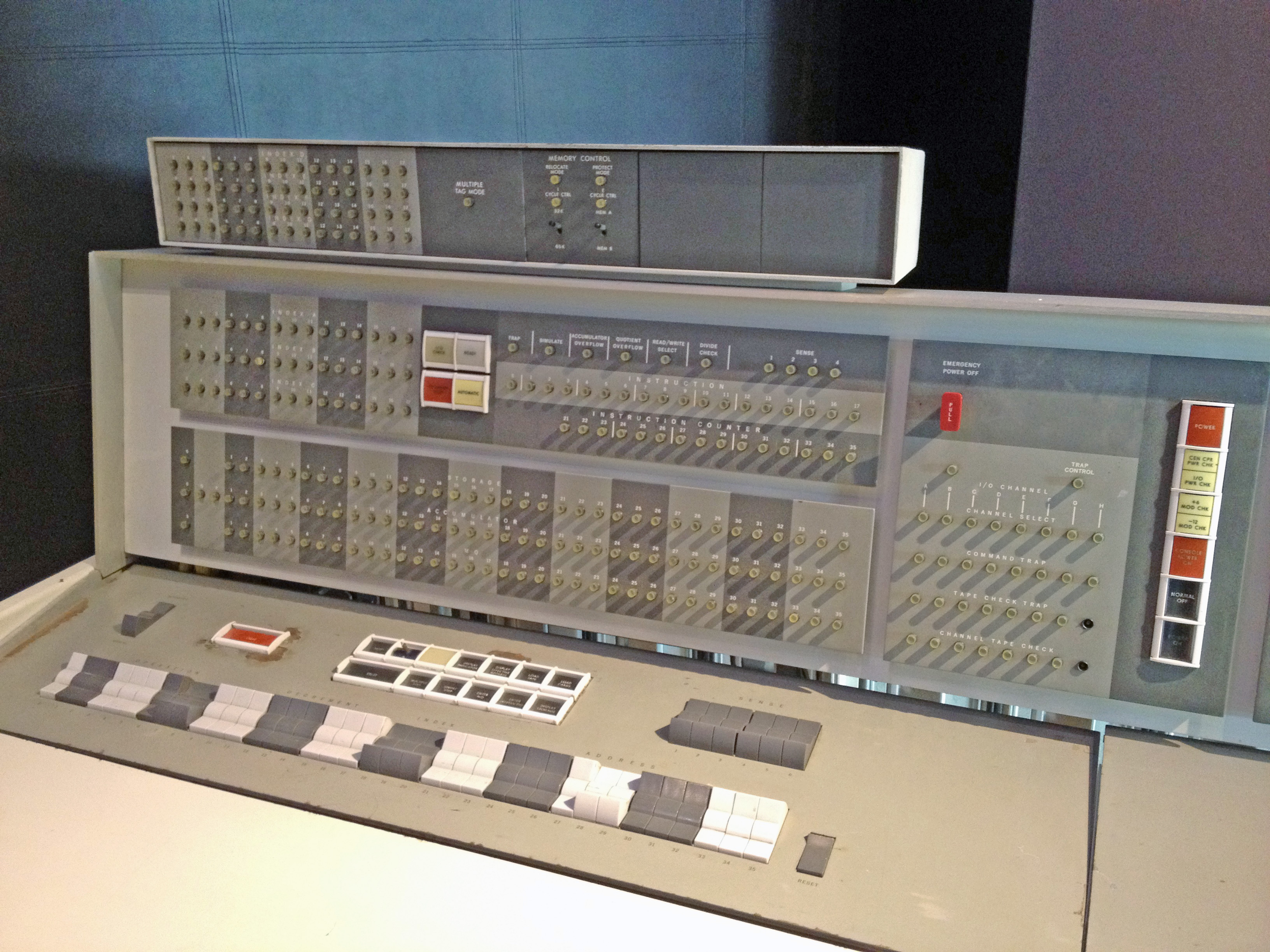
IBM 7094 operator's console shown in the movie, with additional index register displays in a distinctive extra box on top. Note "Multiple Tag Mode" light in the top center.

The movie refers to an IBM 7090 (first released in 1959), but the console shown is for an IBM 7094 (released in 1962).

Some historians and critics also discussed the film's historical accuracy. Although the film was widely praised for bringing attention to Black women mathematics at NASA, some historians and critics noted that the movie simplified parts of the historical record. For example, the film combines multiple real people into certain supporting characters and dramatizes events such as Katherine Johnson running across NASA's campus to use a segregated bathroom. Johnson later explained that she often used integrated bathrooms at NASA, so the scene was added mainly to highlight segregation during that time period. However, the movie still helped increase public awareness of Johnson, Dorothy Vaughan, and Mary Jackson and inspired renewed discussion about the role of women in minorities in STEM fields.

== Release ==
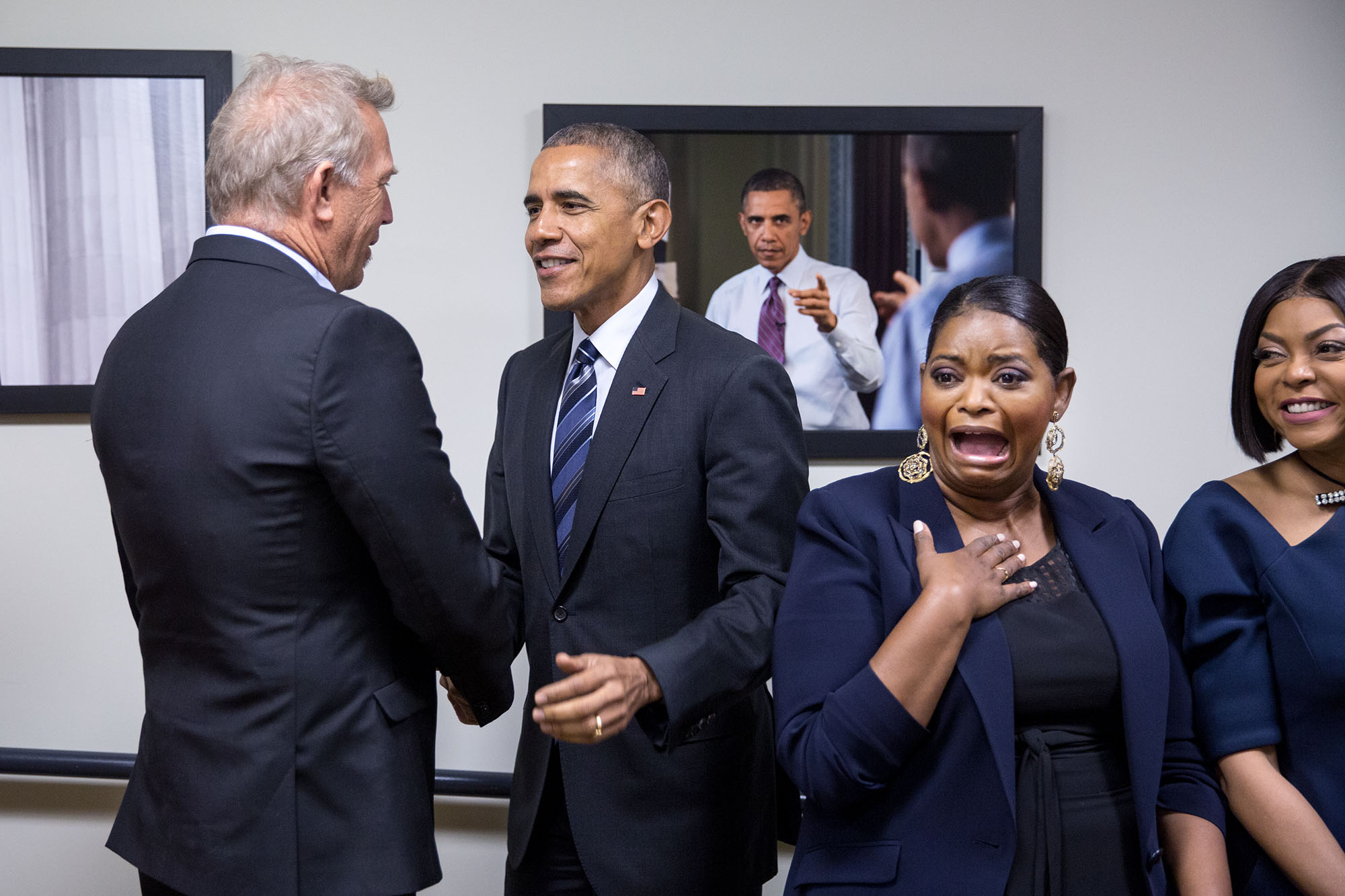
US President Barack Obama greeting Kevin Costner, Octavia Spencer, and Taraji P. Henson on December 15, 2016

The film began a limited release on December 25, 2016, before a wide release on January 6, 2017.

=== Charity screenings ===
After Hidden Figures was released on December 25, 2016, certain charities, institutions and independent businesses who regard the film as relevant to the cause of improving youth awareness in education and careers in the science, technology, engineering, and mathematics (STEM) fields, organized free screenings of the film in order to spread the message of the film's subject matter. A collaborative effort between Western New York STEM Hub, AT&T and the Girl Scouts of the USA allowed more than 200 Buffalo Public Schools students, Girl Scouts and teachers to see the film. WBFO's Senior Reporter Eileen Buckley stated the event was designed to help encourage a new generation of women to consider STEM careers. Research indicates that by 2020, there will be 2.4 million unfilled STEM jobs. Aspiring astronaut Naia Butler-Craig wrote of the film: "I can't imagine what that would have been like: 16-year-old, impressionable, curious and space-obsessed Naia finding out that Black women had something to do with getting Americans on the moon."

Also, the film's principal actors (Henson, Spencer, Monáe and Parsons), director (Melfi), producer/musical creator (Williams), and other non-profit outside groups have offered free screenings to Hidden Figures at several cinema locations around the world. Some of the screenings were open to all-comers, while others were arranged to benefit girls, women and the underprivileged. The campaign began as individual activism by Spencer, and made a total of more than 1,500 seats for Hidden Figures available, free of charge, to poor individuals and families. The result was seven more screenings for people who otherwise might not have been able to afford to see the film – in Atlanta (sponsored by Monáe), in Washington, D.C. (sponsored by Henson), in Chicago (also Henson), in Houston (by Parsons), in Hazelwood, Missouri (by Melfi and actress/co-producer Kimberly Quinn), and in Norfolk and Virginia Beach, Virginia (both sponsored by Williams).

In February 2017, AMC Theatres and 21st Century Fox announced that free screenings of Hidden Figures would take place in celebration of Black History Month in up to 14 select U.S. cities (including Atlanta, Chicago, Dallas, Los Angeles and Miami). The statement described the February charity screenings as building broader awareness of the film's true story of Black women mathematicians who worked at NASA during the Space Race. 21st Century Fox and AMC Theatres also invited schools, community groups and non-profit organizations to apply for additional special screenings to be held in their towns. "As we celebrate Black History Month and look ahead to Women's History Month in March, this story of empowerment and perseverance is more relevant than ever," said Liba Rubenstein, 21st Century Fox's Senior Vice President of Social Impact, "We at 21CF were inspired by the grassroots movement to bring this film to audiences that wouldn't otherwise be able to see it – audiences that might include future innovators and barrier-breakers – and we wanted to support and extend that movement".

Philanthropic non-profit outside groups and other local efforts by individuals have offered free screenings of Hidden Figures by using crowdfunding platforms on the Internet, that allow people to raise money for free film screening events. Dozens of other GoFundMe free screening campaigns have appeared since the film's general release, all by people wanting to raise money to pay for students to see the film.

In 2019, The Walt Disney Company partnered with the U.S. Department of State on the third annual "Hidden No More" exchange program, which was inspired by the film and brings to the United States 50 women from around the world who have excelled in STEM careers such as spacecraft engineering, data solutions and data privacy, and STEM-related education. The exchange program began in 2017 after local US embassies screened the film to their local communities. The support for the screenings was so positive that 48 countries decided to each nominate one woman in STEM to represent their country on a three-week IVLP exchange program in the United States.

=== Merchandising ===
Following the 2017 Lego Ideas Contest, Denmark-based toy maker The Lego Group announced plans to manufacture a fan-designed Women of NASA figurine set of five female scientists, engineers and astronauts, as based on real women who have worked for NASA. The minifigures planned for inclusion in the set were Katherine Johnson, computer scientist Margaret Hamilton; astronaut, physicist and educator Sally Ride; astronomer Nancy Grace Roman; and astronaut and physician Mae Jemison (who is also African American). The finished set did not include Johnson. The Women of NASA set was released November 1, 2017.

Maia Weinstock’s original Lego Ideas submission also included Katherine Johnson, a NASA mathematician who calculated trajectories for the Mercury and Apollo programs, and who was recently featured in the film, Hidden Figures. But Johnson unfortunately isn’t included in Lego’s final version of this set. A company representative told Gizmodo, “In order for us to move forward with a partner we need to obtain approval from all key people, which was not possible in this case. We naturally fully respect this decision.”

=== Home media ===
Hidden Figures was released on Digital HD on March 28, 2017, and Blu-ray, 4K Ultra HD, and DVD on April 11, 2017. The film debuted at No. 3 on the home video sales chart.

== Reception ==
=== Box office ===
Hidden Figures grossed $169.6 million in the United States and Canada, and $66.3 million in other territories, for a worldwide gross of $236 million, against a production budget of $25 million. Domestically, Hidden Figures was the highest-grossing Best Picture nominee at the 89th Academy Awards. Deadline Hollywood calculated the net profit of the film to be $95.55 million, when factoring together all expenses and revenues for the film, making it one of the top twenty most profitable release of 2016.

=== Critical response ===
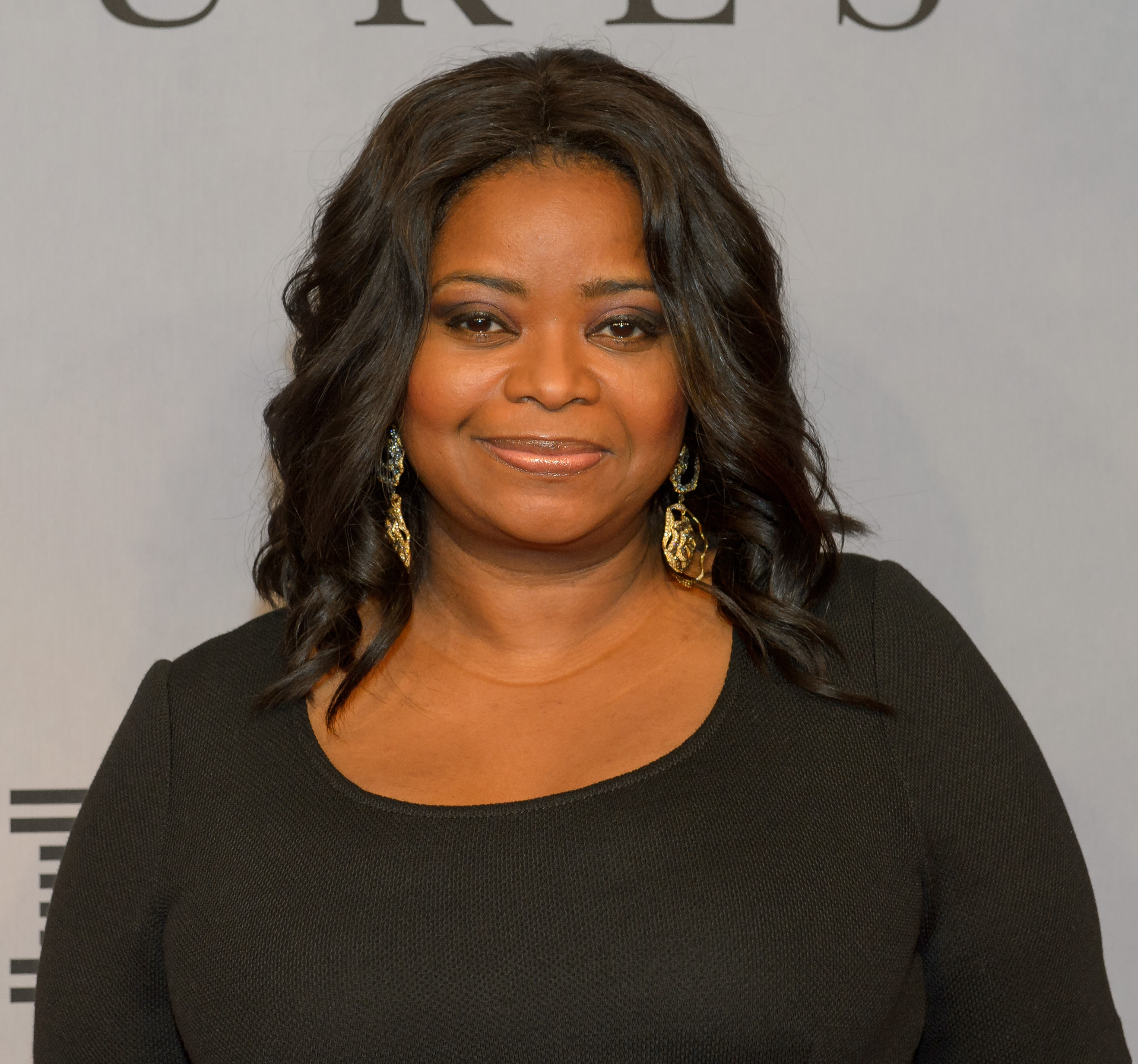
Octavia Spencer's performance as Dorothy Vaughan garnered critical acclaim, earning her a nomination for the Academy Award for Best Supporting Actress.

On review aggregator Rotten Tomatoes, the film has an approval rating of 93% based on 325 reviews, with an average rating of 7.6/10. The website's critical consensus reads, "In heartwarming, crowd-pleasing fashion, Hidden Figures celebrates overlooked—and crucial—contributions from a pivotal moment in American history." On Metacritic, the film has a weighted average score of 74 out of 100, based on 47 critics, indicating "generally favorable" reviews. Audiences polled by CinemaScore gave the film an average grade of "A+" on an A+ to F scale, one of fewer than 90 films in the history of the service to receive such a score.

Simon Thompson of IGN gave the film a rating of nine out of ten, writing, "Hidden Figures fills in an all too forgotten, or simply too widely unknown, blank in US history in a classy, engaging, entertaining and hugely fulfilling way. Superb performances across the board and a fascinating story alone make Hidden Figures a solid, an accomplished and deftly executed movie that entertains, engages and earns your time, money and attention." Ty Burr of The Boston Globe wrote, "the film's made with more heart than art and more skill than subtlety, and it works primarily because of the women that it portrays and the actresses who portray them. Best of all, you come out of the movie knowing who Katherine Johnson and Dorothy Vaughn and Mary Jackson are, and so do your daughters and sons."

Clayton Davis of Awards Circuit gave the film three and a half stars, saying "Precisely marketed as terrific adult entertainment for the Christmas season, Hidden Figures is a faithful and truly beautiful portrait of our country's consistent gloss over the racial tensions that have divided and continue to plague the fabric of our existence. Lavishly engaging from start to finish, Hidden Figures may be able to catch the most inopportune movie-goer off guard and cause them to fall for its undeniable and classic storytelling. The film is not to be missed."

Other reviews criticized the film for its fictional embellishments and conventional, feel-good style. Tim Grierson, writing for Screen International, states that "Hidden Figures is almost patronisingly earnest in its depiction of sexism and racism. An air of do-gooder self-satisfaction hovers over the proceedings", while Jesse Hassenger at The A.V. Club comments that "lack of surprise is in this movie's bones." Eric Kohn of IndieWire argues that the film "trivializes history; as a hagiographic tribute to its brilliant protagonists, it doesn't dig into the essence of their struggles" and similarly, Paul Byrnes concludes that "When a film purports to be selling history, we're entitled to ask where the history went, even if it offers a good time instead."

In 2025, entertainer Mel Brooks cited Hidden Figures as among his favorite films of the 21st century.

== Accolades ==
Among its many achievements, Octavia Spencer was particularly lauded for her portrayal of Dorothy Vaughan and was nominated for the Academy Award for Best Supporting Actress, Golden Globe Award for Best Supporting Actress – Motion Picture and Screen Actors Guild Award for Outstanding Performance by a Female Actor in a Supporting Role. The film's ensemble cast won the Screen Actors Guild Award for Outstanding Performance by a Cast in a Motion Picture. The film itself garnered a nomination for the Academy Award for Best Picture and several nominations its screenplay (including for the Oscar and BAFTA), soundtrack and score.

Overall, the film received three nominations for the 89th Academy Awards in 2017, winning none:

- Best Picture — Donna Gigliotti, Peter Chernin, Jenno Topping, Pharrell Williams and Theodore Melfi (lost to Moonlight)
- Best Supporting Actress — Octavia Spencer (lost to Viola Davis for Fences)
- Best Adapted Screenplay — Allison Schroeder and Theodore Melfi (based on the book Hidden Figures: The American Dream and the Untold Story of the Black Women Who Helped Win the Space Race) (lost to Moonlight)

== See also ==
- African-American women in computer science
- Henrietta Swan Leavitt
- Kathaleen Land
- List of black films of the 2010s
- List of films about mathematicians
- Mathematical fiction
- Women in science
