= List of Morgan State University alumni =

This is a list of notable alumni which includes graduates, non-graduate former students, and current students of Centenary Biblical Institute (1867–1890), Morgan College (1890–1938), Morgan State College (1938–1975), and Morgan State University (1975–present). Located in residential Baltimore, Maryland, Morgan State is a historically black university and Maryland's designated public urban university. The Morgan State University National Alumni Association is the official alumni organization of the university.

See also Morgan State University alumni.

== Arts, news, entertainment, media, and publishing ==
Name	Class year	Notability	Reference(s)
Walt Carr	c. 1953	Political cartoonist and illustrator	
Robert F. Chew		Actor (The Wire)	
Joe Clair		Comedian and BET VJ	
Jae Deal	2002	Composer, music producer	
Walt Dickerson		Jazz vibraphonist	
Dan Foster	Unknown	Nigerian-based radio DJ	
Earl G. Graves	1957	Entrepreneur, philanthropist, founder of Black Enterprise magazine	
Maysa Leak	1991	Jazz singer known as Maysa	
Mo'Nique	attended	Academy Award-winning actress	
William C. Rhoden	1972	New York Times columnist	
April Ryan		Journalist, White House correspondent	
Kevin Short		Opera singer	
Howard "Chip" Silverman	1975	Author: Diner Guys, Ten Bears	
Lonnie Liston Smith		Jazz musician	
David E. Talbert		Playwright, TV producer, and entrepreneur	
Waters Edward Turpin		Harlem Renaissance novelist, professor	
Deniece Williams	attended	R&B and gospel singer	

== Education, science ==
Name	Class year	Notability	Reference(s)
Paris Adkins-Jackson	2018	Epidemiological research on structural racism	
T. J. Bryan		First female president of Fayetteville State University	
Nellie A. Buchanan	1921	Longtime Latin & drama teacher at Frederick Douglass High School	
Warren Buck	1968, BSc	Former physics professor at the Hampton University, where he established the physics graduate program; first chancellor of the University of Washington Bothell	
Ida R. Cummings	1922	First Black kindergarten teacher in Baltimore	
Helen G. Edmonds	1933	Professor of history, North Carolina Central University	
Arthur L. Hardge		Civil rights activist, minister, first African American administrator at the University of Rhode Island, and first African American to head a Rhode Island state agency	
H. Keith Moo-Young	1991	Chancellor, Washington State University, Tri-Cities	
Valerie Thomas		Scientist who invented the illusion transmitter	

== Law ==
=== Judiciary ===
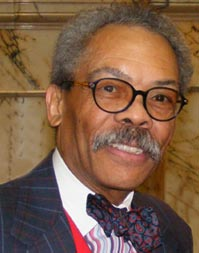
Robert M. Bell

Name	Class year	Notability	Reference(s)
Robert M. Bell		Chief judge, Maryland Court of Appeals	
Roger W. Brown		Judge, Circuit Court, Baltimore (1987–2002)	
Harry A. Cole		First African-American judge on the Maryland Court of Appeals and the first in the Maryland Senate	
Arrie W. Davis		Judge, Maryland Court of Special Appeals	
John R. Hargrove, Sr.		Judge, United States District Court for the District of Maryland (1984–1997)	
Joseph C. Howard, Sr.		Judge, United States District Court for the District of Maryland (1979–2000)	

=== Other legal figures ===
Name	Class year	Notability	Reference(s)
Juanita Jackson Mitchell	c. 1931	First Black woman to practice law in Maryland, civil rights lawyer and activist	

== Military ==
Generals

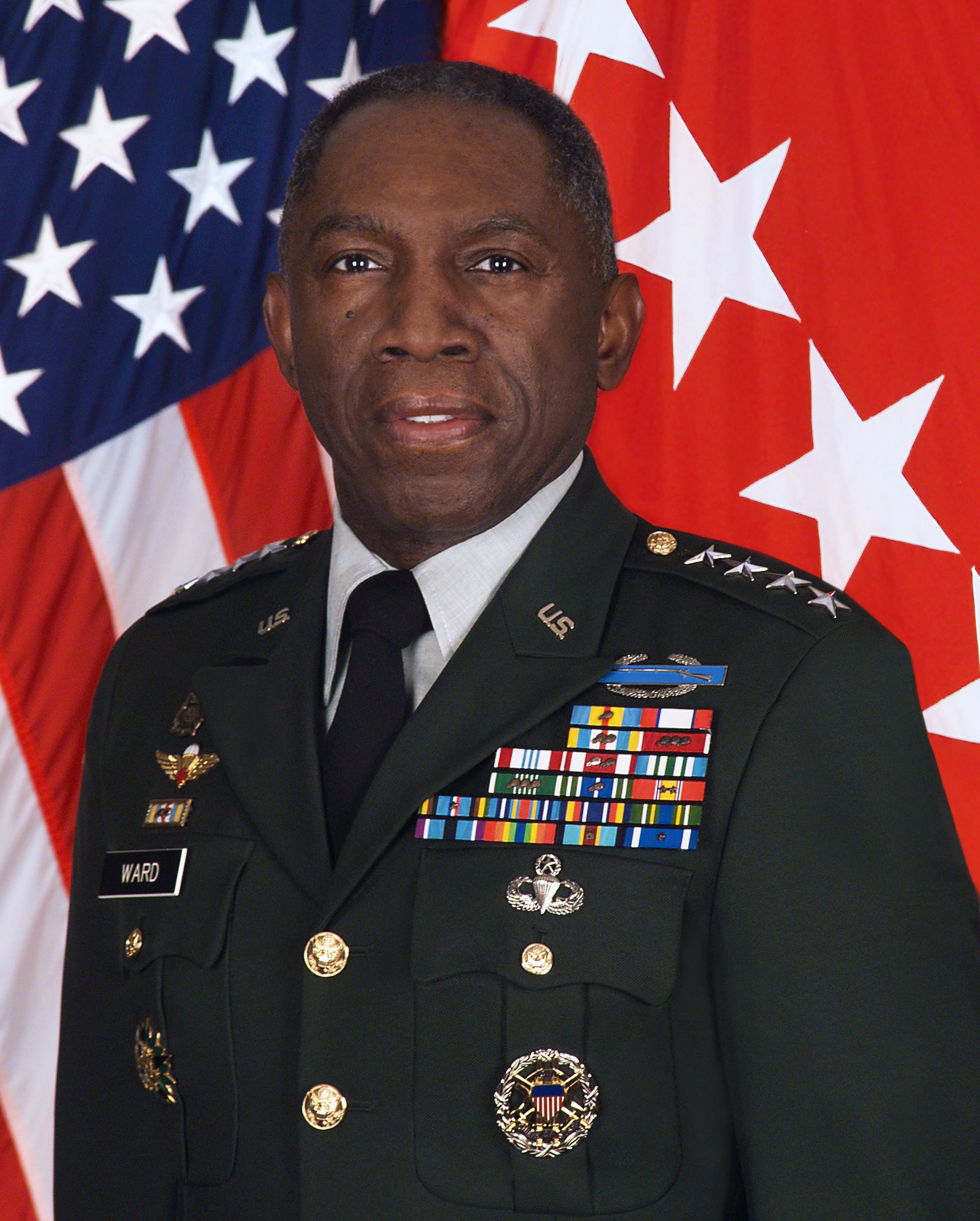
General William Ward

Name	Class year	Notability	Reference(s)
H Steven Blum		Lt. general, United States Army (ret.)	
Larry Ellis		General, United States Army (ret.)	
William E. Ward		General, United States Army, commander, United States Africa Command	

== Police ==
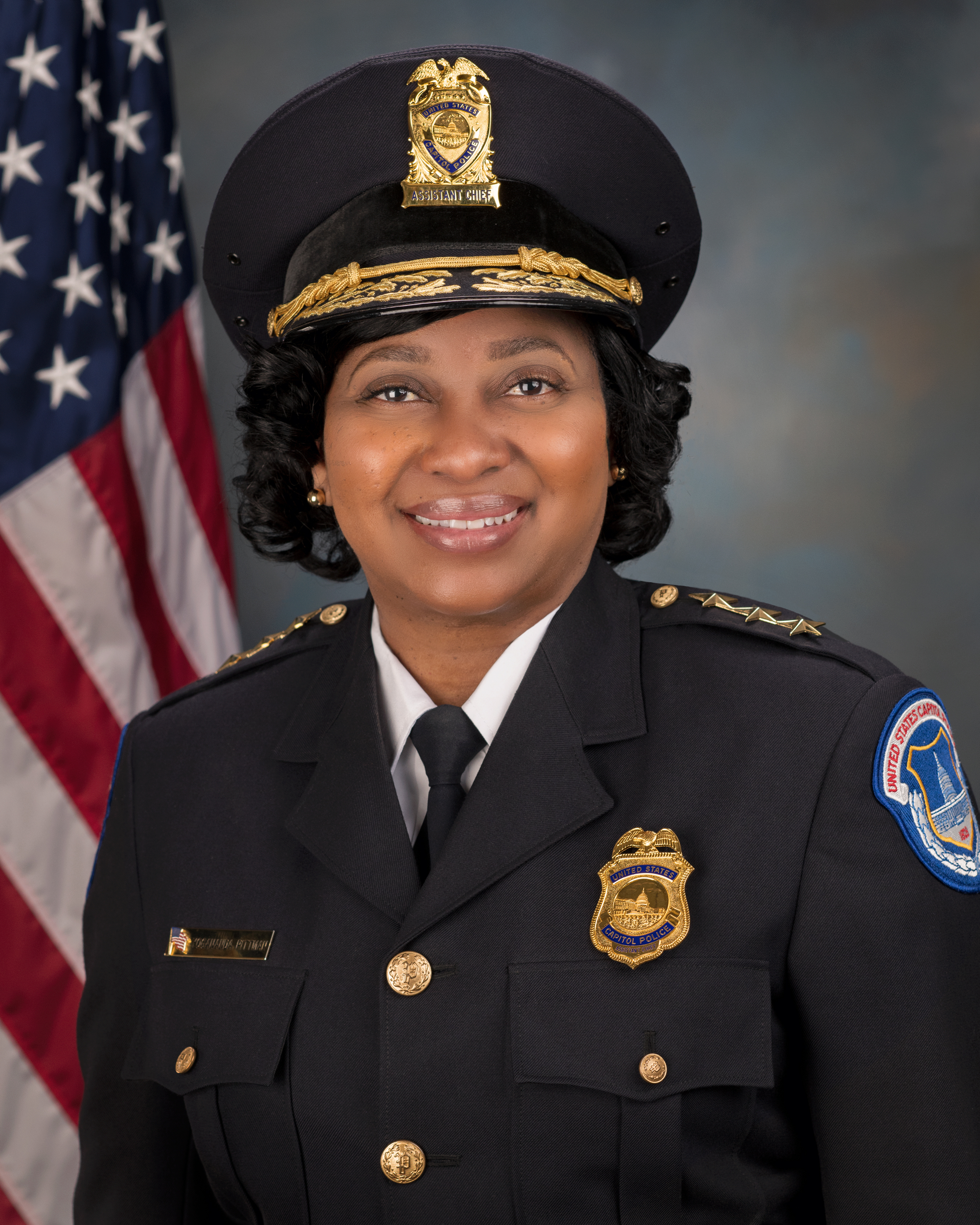
Yogananda Pittman

Name	Class year	Notability	Reference(s)
Yogananda Pittman	1999	Acting chief of the United States Capitol Police	

== Politics ==
Name	Class year	Notability	Reference(s)
Curt Anderson	1973	Maryland House of Delegates, longest serving chairman of the Baltimore City Delegation	
Calvin Ball, III		Howard County executive	
Clarence W. Blount	1950	First African-American majority leader, Maryland State Senate	
David R. Craig	1983	Harford County executive (2005–2014)	
Tony Fulton	1973	Maryland House of Delegates (1986–2005)	
Edward Gainey	1994	Pennsylvania state representative (2013–2022), 61st mayor of Pittsburgh, Pennsylvania	
W. Wilson Goode	1961	First African-American mayor of Philadelphia, Pennsylvania	
Peter C. Harvey	1979	First African American to serve as New Jersey attorney general	
Anthony Hylton		Minister of Foreign Affairs of Jamaica	
Nathaniel J. McFadden		Maryland State Senate	
Kweisi Mfume	1976	Former president of the NAACP and U.S. congressman	
Parren Mitchell		Former U.S. congressman	
Margaret "Peggy" Murphy		Maryland House of Delegates, first Black woman to chair the Baltimore City Delegation	
C. Anthony Muse		Maryland State Senate	
Nathaniel T. Oaks		Maryland House of Delegates	
Catherine Pugh		Mayor of Baltimore	
Howard "Pete" Rawlings		Maryland House of Delegates (1979–2003)	
Tebelelo Seretse		Botswana cabinet minister and ambassador to the United States	
Melvin L. Stukes		Maryland House of Delegates, Baltimore City Council	

== Sports ==
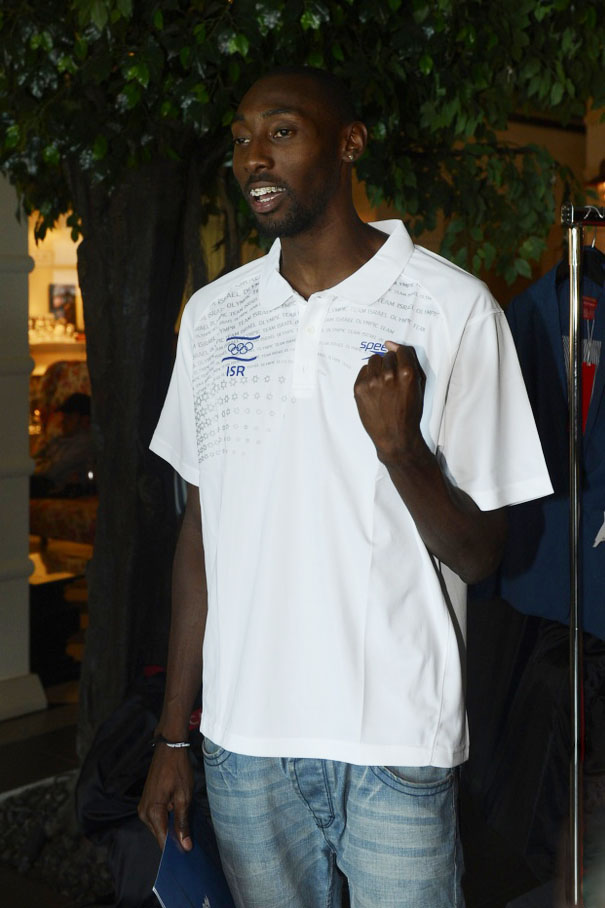
Sanford

Name	Class year	Notability	Reference(s)
Tim Baylor	1976	Defensive back, Baltimore Colts and Minnesota Vikings	
Joe Black	1950	Pitcher, Brooklyn Dodgers, first African-American pitcher to win a World Series Game, NL Rookie of the Year (1952)	
Roosevelt Brown	1952	Tackle, New York Giants, member of the Pro Football Hall of Fame	
Raymond Chester		Tight end, Oakland Raiders	
Josh Culbreath	1955	Track and field – 400 m hurdles – 1956 Summer Olympics bronze medalist	
Sijara Eubanks		Professional mixed martial artist, current UFC Flyweight contender	
Len Ford	1949	End, Cleveland Browns, Pro Football Hall of Fame	
Elvis Franks	1980	Defensive end, Cleveland Browns, Oakland Raiders, New York Jets	
John Fuqua		Running back, Pittsburgh Steelers	
Clarence Gaines	1945	Former basketball coach at Winston-Salem State University, coached most basketball games in college history	
Leroy Kelly	1963	Halfback, Cleveland Browns, member of the Pro Football Hall of Fame	
Willie Lanier	1966	Linebacker, Kansas City Chiefs, member of the Pro Football Hall of Fame	
Dave Meggett	attended, but transferred	NFL player	
Joshua Miles	2018	Offensive tackle, Arizona Cardinals	
Jack Pierce	1984	Track and field – 110 m hurdles – Olympic Games bronze medalist	
Donald Sanford		American-Israeli Olympic sprinter	
Visanthe Shiancoe	2002	Tight end, New England Patriots	
Chad Simpson	2008	Running back, Indianapolis Colts, Buffalo Bills, and Washington Redskins	
Rochelle Stevens	1988	Track and field – 4x400 m relay team – Olympic Games bronze medalist	
Maurice Tyler	1972	Cornerback, Denver Broncos	
Bob Wade	1968	Cornerback, Pittsburgh Steelers, Washington Redskins, Denver Broncos	
Mark Washington	1970	Cornerback, Dallas Cowboys	
Marvin Webster	1974	Center, New York Knicks	
