= Arson damage during the George Floyd protests in Minneapolis–Saint Paul =

Arson damage during the 2020 Minneapolis riots
- Part of the George Floyd protests in Minneapolis–Saint Paul
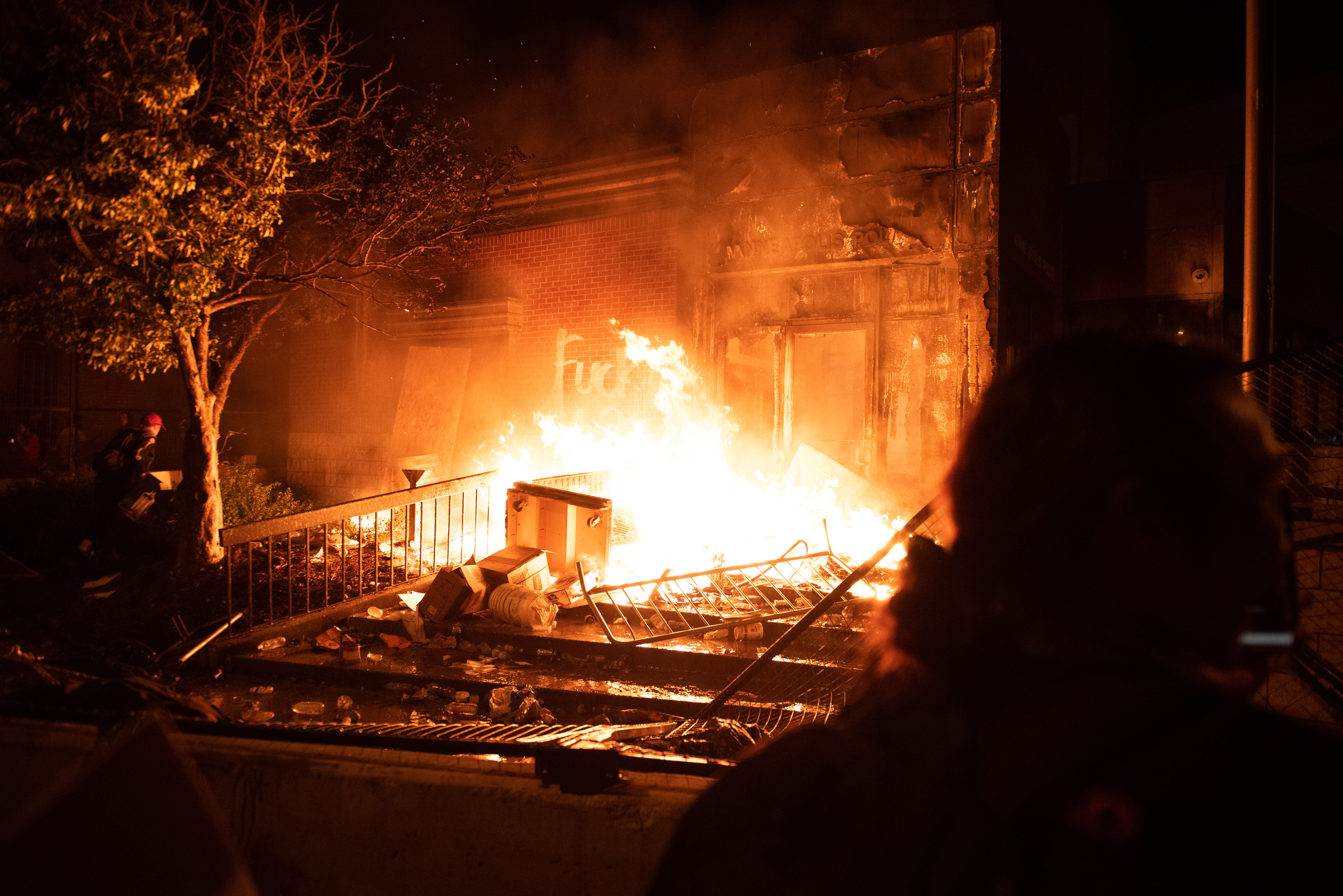
- The Minneapolis Police Department's third precinct station on fire the night of May 28, 2020.
- Date: May 27–30, 2020 (4 days)
- Location: Minneapolis–Saint Paul metropolitan area in the U.S. state of Minnesota
- Caused by: Death of George Floyd; George Floyd protests
- Methods: Arson, rioting

Result
- Death: Oscar Lee Stewart Jr.
- Damage: Authorities tracked 164 separate structure fires during the riots.; At least 200 property locations were affected by arson.
- Charged: 17 for arson-related crimes

The FBI and ATF tracked 164 structure fires from arson that occurred May 27–30, 2020, during the George Floyd protests in Minneapolis–Saint Paul. Rioters started fires by igniting flammable materials, including propane tanks, within or next to buildings and in some cases by deploying Molotov cocktails. Property locations were damaged by spreading flames, heat, and smoke, and by suppressant waters from fire hoses and fire sprinkler systems. Many of the impacted structures suffered heavy damage or were destroyed, with some being reduced to piles of rubble after collapsing.

The widespread acts of arson occurred in the aftermath of the murder of George Floyd on May 25, 2020, and affected properties in the cities of Minneapolis, Saint Paul, and Apple Valley in the U.S. state of Minnesota. Most acts of arson targeted commercial businesses, but schools, non-profit organizations, government offices, and private residences were also targeted by arsonists or indirectly affected by fire. The most notable arson damage was to the Minneapolis Police Department's third precinct police station that was overrun by demonstrators and set on fire the night of May 28. A few blocks away from the police station the same night, Oscar Lee Stewart Jr. died from inhalation and burn injuries after being trapped inside a pawn shop that had been set on fire. During several nights of chaos, fires displaced several dozen residents who evacuated affected houses and apartment buildings.

After the rioting subsided, state and federal authorities had difficulty identifying those responsible for causing destruction. By May 2021, a year after the civil unrest over Floyd's murder, federal investigators had only filed arson charges against 17 people for damages at 11 properties in the Minneapolis–Saint Paul metropolitan region, despite arson affecting nearly 200 properties. In many instances, business owners were left paying for damages out of pocket as more than half of all riot-related losses were not covered by insurance. Some business owners raised money via GoFundMe campaigns or applied for recovery grants to reestablish operations, while many others opted not to rebuild their damaged properties, citing insufficient money or unacceptable financial risks. By 2025, five years after the riots, 48 destroyed properties in Minneapolis were still vacant lots and damaged property buildings remained along Lake Street and other business cooridors in the region.

== Background ==
Video of arson damage in Minneapolis, May 29, 2020

Acts of arson in Minneapolis-Saint Paul occurred during a period of widespread civil disorder following the May 25, 2020, murder of George Floyd, an unarmed Black man, by Derek Chauvin, a White officer with the Minneapolis Police Department. Floyd's murder was captured by a bystander video that quickly circulated widely in the media. Widespread outrage over the video's content led to the George Floyd protests, a global Black Lives Matter movement against structural racism and police brutality. While most people protesting Floyd's murder did so peacefully, mass demonstrations gave way to widespread rioting in Minneapolis, Saint Paul, and Twin Cities' suburbs in the five days after Floyd's murder.

Nearly 1,500 property locations in the Minneapolis-Saint Paul metropolitan area suffered some type of property damage during the riots, such as by fire, looting, smashed windows or doors, graffiti, ransacking, or other forms of vandalism. At a cost of approximately $500 million, local unrest after the murder of George Floyd was the second most destructive in United States history, after the 1992 Los Angeles riots. About 60% of the financial losses from rioting in Minneapolis–Saint Paul were uninsured.

== Property locations ==
Arson damage occurred in Minneapolis, Saint Paul, and the Twin Cities suburb of Apple Valley between May 27 and 30, 2020. Reports by government officials and the news media varied as to the number of property locations in the Minneapolis–Saint Paul metropolitan area that were damaged by fire, as some structure fires affected multiple businesses or adjacent structures. The FBI and ATF tracked 164 structure fires due to arson during the unrest. The federal government's number reflected buildings affected by arson and not individual acts of arson. Reporters for Bring Me The News, The Pioneer Press, and Star Tribune separately compiled lists of property damage with the help of reader submissions. Other news media reported on arson damage to specific property locations and businesses. In Minneapolis, the city's assessor published a database of damage to parcels, but it did not account for affected parcels with multiple buildings or for multi-use buildings. In Saint Paul, the city's fire department responded to 55 fires, but not all fires were to buildings.

Most properties affected by arson were commercial in nature, but the impact was felt beyond businesses. Arson fires damaged buildings containing schools, non-profit organizations, government services, and private residences. Many property locations owned and operated by ethnic minorities and immigrants were among those damaged by fire, as were several locations of national chain stores. In Minneapolis, 35 families were displaced by structure fires. During the riots, some business owners posted signs that the establishment was Black, minority, or independently owned, but the signs had varying success at dissuading damage. Some residents that lived in multi-buildings or above store fronts resorted to posting signs that people lived above or inside to persuade against arson. In the immediate aftermath of the riots, local officials estimated that rebuilding damaged commercial corridors in the Minneapolis–Saint Paul metropolitan area could take 10 years.

This list is of property locations that were damaged by arson fires during George Floyd protests in the Minneapolis–Saint Paul metropolitan region of the U.S. state of Minnesota. To be included on the list, the fire damage must be reported in a reliable source as occurring during the period of civil disorder in the five days after Floyd's murder on May 25, 2020. This list excludes freestanding objects that were set on fire during the riots, such as vehicles, bus shelters, trees, or piles of objects in the street. It also excludes intentional building fires that occurred during subsequent events of the 2020-2023 Minneapolis–Saint Paul racial unrest after May 2020.

Image	Name	Street address	City	Description	Ref.
	27th Ave Café	3015 27th Avenue S	Minneapolis	The restaurant was located between Gandhi Mahal and Migizi. The entire 3000 block of 27th Avenue South was destroyed by fire during the riots and all structures were demolished.	
	7 Mile Fashion	2116 East Lake Street	Minneapolis	Located in the Hi-Lake shopping center, the minority-owned clothing and beauty supply store was looted on May 27, 2020, and destroyed by arson on May 28, 2020. The owners tallied losses of $2.5 million at the location and for two others in Minneapolis that were looted. Insurance only covered $600,000 of the total losses and the owners sought out other forms of financial aid for recovery.	
	7-Mile Sportswear	590 University Avenue W	Saint Paul	The clothing and wig store was damaged by a fire set inside the storage room on May 28, 2020. Jose A. Felan Jr. of Rochester, Minnesota, pleaded guilty to a federal arson charge in connection to the fire at the store and several others along University Avenue. Owner Jin Lim estimated that $1 million in inventory was lost to looting.	
	7-Sigma, Inc.	2843 26th Avenue S	Minneapolis	The manufacturing company's building suffered extensive fire damage on May 28, 2020, when firefighting crews were unable to respond due to prevailing unrest. Part of the factory was destroyed. Located at the property since 1987, the company said in the aftermath of the riots it would leave Minneapolis after losing trust in public officials. The property location, along with several other parcels on 26th Avenue, sold for $2.25 million in April 2022 with redevelopments plans for a brewery and commercial market.	
	ABC Supply Co.	2727 26th Avenue S	Minneapolis	The construction company's property location was damaged by fire on May 29, 2020.	
	ACE Cash Express	2701 East Lake Street	Minneapolis	The financial business was in the former Odd Fellows buildings, a multi-use historic structure near the intersection of 27th Avenue and East Lake Street that was destroyed by fire during the overnight hours of May 28, 2020.	
	Addis Ababa	2713 East Lake Street	Minneapolis	The Ethiopian restaurant was in the multi-use commercial building at 27th Avenue and East Lake Street and was destroyed by fire the night of May 28, 2020.	
	Admas Travel	2941 Chicago Avenue	Minneapolis	Owned by an African immigrant and located within the Chicago Furniture Warehouse building, the travel agency's office was looted on May 29, 2020, and destroyed by fire during the overnight hours into May 30. The owner received a grant from the Lake Street Council and raised money via GoFundMe to reestablish the business.	
	Agencia Elektra	715 East Lake Street	Minneapolis	The money transfer business was in the commercial building on the 700 block of East Lake Street that was destroyed by fire. Owned by an Ecuadorian immigrant family, the business sustained $175,000 in inventory and equipment losses. In the months after the fire, insurance claims did not cover the losses.	
	Aldi	2929 27th Avenue S	Minneapolis	The grocery store suffered minor fire damage and closed on May 28, 2020. It reopened four months later in September 2020.	
	Anytime Fitness	2104 West Broadway	Minneapolis	Molotov cocktails thrown onto the roof caused $100,000 in damages to the multi-use building. Insurance payments did not cover riot damages. The property owner received grants from West Broadway Business and Area Coalition to pay for repairs.	
	Apartment building	2815 East Lake Street	Minneapolis	The multi-use building at 2815/2817 East Lake Street was entirely destroyed by fire. The main level had a Metro by T-Mobile cellphone store. The structure also had eight apartment units. A re-building plan was announced in February 2021.	
	Arby's	3000 Snelling Avenue	Minneapolis	The restaurant was destroyed by fire. Inspire Brands, the property owner, did not initially rebuild, citing potential for unrest over the looming trials for the four police officers responsible for Floyd's murder. The property was one of a few with a drive thru in Minneapolis, which the city had banned new development of. The restaurant property was eventually rebuilt with a drive thru, and a Raising Cane's Chicken Fingers opened in the space in May 2021.	
	Atlas Staffing	102 East Lake Street	Minneapolis	The temporary staffing business was destroyed by fire the night of May 29, 2020. The ruined property was demolished in January 2021.	
	AutoZone	2610 East Lake Street	Minneapolis	Located near the Minneapolis third police precinct station, the auto parts was the first structure to be set on fire during the riots. The structure was destroyed by fire on May 27, 2020, and it was later demolished in the aftermath of the riots. The auto parts store reopened in mid 2021 in a newly constructed building at the property location.	
	AutoZone	1075 University Avenue W	Saint Paul	Fires rendered the auto parts store's structure unsafe and it was bulldozed. The auto parts store reopened in 2021 after a $1 million rebuild.	
	Basilica of Saint Mary	88 N 17th St	Minneapolis	On May 29, 2020, the basilica church had minor fire damage, with two pews being splashed with flammable liquid and burned.	
	Big Top Wines & Spirits	1544 University Avenue W	Saint Paul	The liquor store suffered heavy fire damage. After remaining shuttered and fenced off, the burnt out building was demolished 15 months later. Along with the broader area, the property is slated for a $200 million multi-use redevelopment project around the Allianz Field soccer stadium.	
	Bismillah Grocery & Coffee	2926 Chicago Avenue	Minneapolis	The grocery store was destroyed by fire. The building it was located in was built in 1962. The market value of the destroyed building was $200,000, but the cost to replace it was $400,000.	
	Bling-Bling Beauty Supply	2932 Chicago Avenue	Minneapolis	The beauty supply store was looted and destroyed by fire. Insurance only covered 40 percent of the damages, which left the owner with $132,000 in uninsured losses.	
	Bolé Ethiopian Cuisine	490 Syndicate Street N	Saint Paul	Located in a commercial building on the 1200 block of University Avenue, the immigrant-owned Ethiopian restaurant was destroyed by fire. It relocated to another location in Saint Paul with the help of a grant from the Midway Chamber of Commerce.	
	Bolé Express	490 Syndicate Street N	Saint Paul	Located in a commercial building on the 1200 block of University Avenue in the former space of a Subway restaurant, the Ethiopian fast-casual restaurant that was slated to open was destroyed by fire.	
	Boost Mobile	711 East Lake Street	Minneapolis	The commercial building was destroyed by fire.	
	Boost Mobile	2144 N 44th Avenue	Minneapolis	The cellphone store, also reported as at 44th and Penn Avenue N, was destroyed by fire.	
	Boost Mobile	1499 University Avenue W	Saint Paul	The cellphone store was destroyed by fire.	
	Boost Mobile	317 East Lake Street	Minneapolis	The cellphone store was a store front in the building on the 300 block of East Lake Street that was destroyed by fire.	
	CFSC New Money Express	108 East Lake Street	Minneapolis	The money transfer business was destroyed by fire.	
	Chicago & Lake Liquor	825 East Lake Street	Minneapolis	Built in 1959, the liquore store was damaged by six fires over several nights and destroyed. The city assessor reported the damage as for 823 and 825 East Lake Street. The store re-opened in late 2020 after a $3 million rebuild.	
	Chicago Furniture Warehouse	2941 Chicago Avenue	Minneapolis	The furniture business, owned by an Ethiopian immigrant, was destroyed by fire during the early morning hours of May 30. The store had been vandalized and looted two days prior. Insurance payments and online fundraising efforts were initially inadequate to cover the estimated $4 million costs to rebuild.	
	Chicago Lake Family Dental	2900 Chicago Avenue	Minneapolis	Owned by a Palestinian-American family, the dental office was destroyed. Security camera footage captured looters breaking into the building at midnight on May 29, 2020. After they removed equipment and furniture, the looters set the building on fire, resulting in $1 million in damages. Insurance only covered half of the loses and the owners had to raise $100,000 via GoFundMe to aid rebuilding efforts. The clinic re-opened in April 2021.	
	Citi Trends	2106 East Lake Street	Minneapolis	The clothing store was destroyed by fires set overnight from May 28 to 29, 2020.	
	Coliseum Building and Hall	2700 East Lake Street	Minneapolis	Over several days between May 27 to 29, 2020, the historic building was vandalized and severely damaged by fire, but the scorched brick façade remained standing. All of the building tenants vacated the building in the aftermath of the riots. A $26 million redevelopment project was announced in late 2021 for the property, which was purchased by Seward Redesign, a non-profit development firm. The firm received a $750,000 recovery grant to aid redevelopment of the 85,000 square-foot property.	
	Community Action Partnership of Ramsey & Washington Counties	450 Syndicate Street N	Saint Paul	The social services organization suffered fire damage.	
	Cricket Wireless	2934 Chicago Avenue	Minneapolis	The cellphone store was destroyed by fire.	
	Cub Foods	2850 26th Avenue S	Minneapolis	Fire alarms went off at grocery store near East Lake Street and it suffered fire and other damage. After a renovation, the store reopened in February 2021.	
	Dakota County Western Service Center	14955 Galaxie Avenue	Apple Valley	The government service center was damaged by fire bombing during the early morning hours of May 29, 2020. Minnesota residents of Fornandous Cortez Henderson and Garret Patrick Ziegler broke windows and threw Molotov cocktails inside the building that caused fire and smoke damage. They also poured liquid accelerate around the building and attempted to set it on fire. The two men pleaded guilty to federal arson charges in late 2020.	
	Denny's	2700 East Lake Street	Minneapolis	Located in the Coliseum building, the vacated former location of the restaurant was destroyed by fire.	
	Discount Tire	1350 University Avenue W	Saint Paul	Mohamed Hussein Abdi of Maplewood, Minnesota, attempted to set fires inside the automotive tire business. The sprinkling system activated and suppressed fires, which spared the building and its inventory. Total damages were about as much as $40,000. Abdi pleaded guilty to conspiracy to commit arson and was sentenced to five years of probation in early 2022.	
	Dollar General	2136 East Lake Street	Minneapolis	Part of the Hi-Like shopping center, the store was destroyed by fire.	
	Dollar General	1990 Suburban Avenue	Saint Paul	Located in the Scenic Hills shopping center, the exterior of the store had fire damage.	
	Dollar Tree	2858 26th Avenue S	Minneapolis	Part of Minnehaha Mall shopping center, the store suffered major fire damage.	
	Domino's Pizza	2801 26th Avenue S	Minneapolis	The restaurant was destroyed by fire.	
	DTLR	1515 University Avenue W	Saint Paul	The clothing store had smoke damage.	
	Du Nord Craft Spirits	2610 E 32nd Street	Minneapolis	The Black-owned microdistillery had fire and water damage. Around 2:00 a.m. on May 29, 2020, rioters started a fire in the distillery's warehouse, which activated the building's fire suppression sprinkling system. Employees had posted "Black Owned" signs at the distillery's cocktail room, located in a separate structure, which was spared from riot damage.	
	East Lake Library	2727 East Lake Street	Minneapolis	On May 28, 2020, the public library building was vandalized and heavily damaged by smoke and water. It reopened a year later after a $1.1 million renovation project.	
	El Nuevo Rodeo	2709 East Lake Street	Minneapolis	The Latin restaurant was in the former Odd Fellows buildings, a multi-use historic structure near the intersection of 27th Avenue and East Lake Street that was destroyed by fire during the overnight hours of May 28, 2020.	
	El Sabor Chuchi	717 East Lake Street	Minneapolis	The business was located in a commercial building that was destroyed by fire.	
	Elite Cleaners	3101 Minnehaha Avenue	Minneapolis	The dry cleaning business, owned by Indian immigrants, was looted and set on fire in the days after Floyd's murder. The structure was badly damaged, but it did not collapse. The building's owner did not have insurance to rebuild. The property was acquired by Seward Redesign, Inc., and then by the dry cleaning business owners, who later rebuilt and reopened the store at the same location.	
	Enterprise Rent-A-Car	1161 University Avenue W	Saint Paul	The car rental business was destroyed by fire on May 28, 2020. Matthew Scott White of Saint Paul, Minnesota, pleaded guilty to one act of arson for starting the fire and was sentenced to 72 months in prison in June 2021. After an $800,000 reconstruction of its building, the business reopened in 2021.	
	Express Payday Loans	106 East Lake Street	Minneapolis	The business, located next to Atlas Staffing, was destroyed by fire. The ruined property was demolished in January 2021 at cost of $75,000 to the owner.	
	Fade Factory	2415 West Broadway Avenue	Minneapolis	The Black-owned barbershop, which had been under the same family's ownership for four decades, was destroyed by fire. The owner received $200,000 in insurance payments, which were insufficient to rebuild. The owner borrowed $40,000 and received a $10,000 grant from Beyoncé's BeyGood foundation, and the NAACP helped pay for demolition. Citing insufficient funds, the barbershop owner had not rebuilt by mid-2022.	
	Family Dollar	1010 East Lake Street	Minneapolis	The store was destroyed by fire. After the lot was vacant for three years, plans were announced in late 2024 to relocated Southside Community Health Services to a new building on the site.	
	Family Dollar	3536 Nicollet Avenue	Minneapolis	The store, located next to O'Reilly Auto Parts on the same parcel, was destroyed by fires set in the early morning hours on May 30, 2020, after protests the night before intensified around the Minneapolis police fifth precinct building. The site was redeveloped into an apartment building.	
	Fatima African Hair Braiding	715 East Lake Street	Minneapolis	The beauty parlor was destroyed by fire.	
	Floras Hair Designs	921 West Broadway Avenue	Minneapolis	The Black-owned beauty parlor had been a fixture at the location since 1986. In early 2020, the business owner had dropped insurance coverage due to financial difficulties caused by the COVID-19 pandemic. The beauty parlor was part of several store fronts on the 900 block of West Broadway Avenue that were destroyed by arsonists the evening of May 29, 2020. In the months after the riots, the owner was unable to recover her losses and sought other forms of financial aid.	
	Friedman's Department Store	400 West Broadway Avenue	Minneapolis	The owners of the family-owned clothing store were robbed at gunpoint by arsonists during the riots. The shoe store was heavily damaged. Insurance did not cover all property and inventory losses. The store reopened in 2023.	
	Hook & Ladder Theater	3010 Minnehaha Avenue	Minneapolis	The historic firehouse structure, located next to the Minneapolis third police precinct station, contained a live music venue. It was among the businesses damaged on May 28, 2020, after police evacuated their station and fled the area. Rioters broke into the building, looted it, and attempted to set it on fire. The sprinkling system activated, which prevented the structure from catching on fire, but caused substantial water damage that required repairs and renovation.	
	Foot Locker	806 East Lake Street	Minneapolis	The shoe store suffered severe fire damage.	
	Foot Locker	1484 University Avenue W	Saint Paul	The shoe store suffered extensive fire damage. It was bulldozed along with the Midway Shopping Center.	
	Furniture Barn	1389 University Avenue W	Saint Paul	The furniture store was damaged by fire.	
	GameStop	1484 University Avenue W	Saint Paul	The game store suffered extensive fire damage. It was bulldozed along with the Midway Shopping Center.	
	Gandhi Mahal Restaurant	3009 27th Avenue S	Minneapolis	The Indian-Bangladeshi restaurant was destroyed by fire. The owner famously said, “Let my building burn. Justice needs to be served,” during the initial riots, and became an international symbol of the unrest. In January 2021, the owner paid $80,000 in demolition costs out of pocket after being unable to secure city financing for demolition. By June 2022, the owner decided not to rebuild the restaurant as he considered project costs.	
	George Date Co.	2743 26th Avenue S	Minneapolis	Located next to Schubert & Hoey Outdoor Advertising, the property received minor fire damage.	
	Glass Endeavors	2716 31st Street E	Minneapolis	The business had minor property damage from nearby fires. The business owner hosed down the buildings bricks to prevent further damage.	
	GM Tobacco	2619 East Lake Street	Minneapolis	The tobacco shop was destroyed by fire.	
	GM Tobacco	2740 Minnehaha Avenue, Suite 100	Minneapolis	The tobacco shop suffered major fire damage.	
	Gopuff	815 Cedar Avenue	Minneapolis	The building of the food delivery service was destroyed by fire.	
	Goodwill	1239 University Avenue W	Saint Paul	The second-hand store suffered fire damage. It reopened in August 2020.	
	Gordon Parks High School	1212 University Avenue W	Saint Paul	Jose A. Felan Jr. of Rochester, Minnesota, and Mohamed Hussein Abdi of Maplewood, Minnesota, pleaded guilty to federal arson charges for lighting fires inside the school building on May 28, 2020.	
	Grand Ole Creamery	4737 Cedar Avenue S	Minneapolis	The ice cream shop was damaged by fire.	
	Great Clips	1474 University Avenue W	Saint Paul	The barbershop suffered extensive fire damage.	
	Great Health Nutrition	1360 University Avenue W Suite 105	Saint Paul	Samuel Elliott Frey of Brooklyn Park, Minnesota, pleaded guilty to conspiracy to commit arson for setting a fire inside the supplements and nutrition store. The fire activated the sprinkling system, which caused extensive water damage. Frey was sentenced to two years in prison in early 2022. McKenzy Ann DeGidio Dunn of Rosemount, Minnesota, also pleaded guilty to a federal arson charged related to the fire and was sentenced to 180 days of home confinement.	
	Guzior Armbrecht Maher	2700 East Lake Street, Suite 3300	Minneapolis	Located in the Coliseum building, the law office was destroyed by fire.	
	H&R Block	2210 East Lake Street	Minneapolis	The tax preparation business was destroyed by fire.	
	HD Laundry	2112 East Lake Street	Minneapolis	Part of the Hi-Like shopping center, the laundry mat was destroyed by fire.	
	Hennepin Healthcare East Lake Clinic	2700 East Lake Street, Suite 1100	Minneapolis	Located in the Coliseum building, the health care clinic was destroyed by fire after a Molotov cocktail was thrown through the window during the early morning hours of May 30, 2020. In 2022, the U.S. Congress appropriated $4.6 million to rebuild the clinic.	
	Hexagon Bar	2600 27th Avenue S	Minneapolis	Located in the Seward neighborhood since 1934, the establishment was named after its wooden, hexagon-shaped bar. The building was destroyed by fires set overnight on May 28, 2020. By 2 a.m. on May 29, photos were circulating online of the building engulfed in flames. The bar's social media post initially blamed Black Lives Matter for the fire, but the establishment later rescinded the characterization of responsibility.	
	Hi-Lake Liquors	2130 East Lake Street Unit E	Minneapolis	The liquor store had fire damage.	
	Hi-Lake Shopping Center	2130 East Lake Street	Minneapolis	The 74,000 square-foot shopping center was deemed a total loss after suffered extensive fire damage. Most of it was demolished and rebuilt in 2021.	
	Holiday	2322 N Washington Avenue	Minneapolis	The gas station was destroyed by fire.	
	Holiday	281 Snelling Avenue N	Saint Paul	A dumpster was lit on fire at the gas station.	
	Holiday	4601 Hiawatha Avenue	Minneapolis	The gas station was destroyed by fire.	
	Home Choice	2208 East Lake Street	Minneapolis	Located in the Hi-Lake shopping center, the health care company was destroyed by fire.	
	Hop Wong	2924 Chicago Avenue	Minneapolis	The Chinese restaurant had heavy fire damage.	
	Integrated Staffing Solutions	2703 East Lake Street	Minneapolis	The business was in the multi-use commercial building at 27th Avenue and East Lake Street that was destroyed by fire the night of May 28, 2020.	
	International Order of Odd Fellows ("IOOF") historic building	3003 27th Avenue S	Minneapolis	The International Order of Odd Fellows ("IOOF") Flour City Lodge #118 building at 27th Avenue and East Lake Street was built in 1909. Throughough the 1900s the building was part of a center of commercial activity for the Longfellow community in Minneapolis. By the 2020s, the historic structure was owned by a Nigerian immigrant and it had several Latino-owned commercial businesses as tenants. At 10 p.m. on May 28, 2020, employees of the "La Raza" radio station located inside the building reported hearing an explosion and evacuated. The building burnt down around 2:30 a.m. on May 29. Insurance payments only covered $3 million in losses, of which $500,000 was needed to demolish what remained of the heavily damaged structure. Rebuilding costs were estimated at $9 million. Citing financial risk, the owner decided not to rebuild, and sold the property to a housing developer.	
	Iron Door Pub	3001 Lyndale Avenue S	Minneapolis	A small fire was set inside the bar. The sprinkling system caused substantial damage.	
	Ivy Building	2637 27th Avenue S	Minneapolis	Embers from the fire at the Hexagon Bar ignited the Ivy Building on fire.	
	Jackson Hewitt	1275 University Avenue W	Saint Paul	Located in a commercial building on the 1200 block of University Avenue, the tax preparation business was destroyed by fire.	
	La Raza (KMNV-FM)	3003 27th Avenue S, Suite 400	Minneapolis	The Spanish language radio station studio was in former Odd Fellows buildings, a multi-use historic structure, near the intersection of 27th Avenue and East Lake Street that was destroyed by fire. Employees inside the building reported hearing an explosion at 10 p.m. on May 28 and evacuated. The building burnt down around 2:30 a.m. on May 29.	
	Laddatude Tattoo	3004 27th Avenue S	Minneapolis	The tattoo parlor suffered fire damage.	
	Lake Street Tobacco	812 East Lake Street	Minneapolis	The tobacco shop was destroyed by fire.	
	Leeann Chin	1360 University Avenue W, Suite 101	Saint Paul	The restaurant suffered severe fire damage.	
	LEVELS MPLS	713 East Lake Street	Minneapolis	On May 28, 2020, fires lit on the block spread to the commercial building containing the Black- and woman-owned marketing business, which was destroyed. Losses were not fully covered by insurance and the owners sought out other forms of financial aid for recovery.	
	Little Caesars	2218 East Lake Street	Minneapolis	Located in the Hi-Lake shopping center, the pizzeria suffered fire damage.	
	Lloyd's Pharmacy	720 Snelling Avenue N	Saint Paul	The independent pharmacy was destroyed by fire. It has since been rebuilt.	
	Longfellow/Seward Healthy Seniors	2800 E Lake Street	Minneapolis	The health care company suffered severe damage from smoke and water.	
	Lupita	1311 East Lake Street	Minneapolis	The beauty salon had minor fire damage.	
	LV's Barbershop	3006 27th Avenue S	Minneapolis	During the early morning hours of May 29, 2020, the Latino-owned barbershop suffered fire damage to a backwall that abutted the Minnehaha Lake Liquor and a tobacco shop that both burned down. Owners of the barbershop put up plywood panels with the words "Minority Owned" hoping to prevent further damage. The barbershop reopened in the aftermath of the riots, but the barbershop location eventually closed for good in late 2022.	
	Mailbox Solutions Plus	2148 N 44th Avenue	Minneapolis	The store was destroyed by fire.	
	Mama Safia's Kitchen	2700 East Lake Street, Suite 1300	Minneapolis	The Somali cuisine restaurant was located in the multi-use Coliseum Building. It was destroyed by fire. At the time of the riots, it was closed due to COVID-19 pandemic mitigation measures and the Somali-immigrant owner was unable to retain insurance. Family of the owner raised money via GoFundMe to rebuild.	
	Master Collision	224 West Lake Street	Minneapolis	The auto repair shop suffered major fire damage.	
	maX it PAWN	815 Cedar Avenue S	Minneapolis	The pawn shop was destroyed by fire.	
	maX it PAWN	2726 East Lake Street	Minneapolis	The pawn shop, located near the third police precinct station, was destroyed by fire the night of May 28, 2020. Oscar Lee Stewart Jr. was burned alive in the fire after being trapped inside. Montez Terriel Lee Jr. was convicted of federal arson charges for setting the intentional building fire, but prosecutors in his case believed that Lee did not know Steward was stuck inside the building at the time.	
	maX it PAWN	1519 University Avenue W	Saint Paul	The pawn shop suffered fire damage.	
	Metro by T-Mobile	2815 East Lake Street	Minneapolis	The multi-use building at 2815/2817 East Lake Street was entirely destroyed by fire. The main level had a Metro by T-Mobile cellphone store. The structure also had eight apartment units. A re-building plan was announced in February 2021.	
	Metro by T-Mobile	925 West Broadway Avenue	Minneapolis	The Black-owned property that featured a cellphone store was part of several store fronts on the 900 block of West Broadway Avenue that were destroyed by arsonists the evening of May 29, 2020. In early 2020, the business owner had dropped insurance coverage due to financial difficulties caused by the COVID-19 pandemic. In the months after the riots, the owner was unable to recover her losses and sought other forms of financial aid.	
	Midnight Cycle and Speed	815 Cedar Avenue	Minneapolis	The motorcycle shop was destroyed by fire.	
	Midori's Floating World Cafe	2629 East Lake Street	Minneapolis	Located near the third police precinct station, the restaurant suffered fire damage. Insurance money was insufficient to fully repair the space. With the help of fundraising and grants, the restaurant reopened at a new location on East Lake Street two years later.	
	Midtown Corner apartments (under construction)	2912 28th Avenue S	Minneapolis	The Midtown Corner apartment complex, an under construction affordable housing project for 200 living units, was destroyed by fire on May 28, 2020. The $37 million financial loss was one of the single biggest during the riots. A rebuilt structure opened in mid 2021 under the name Everlake.	
	Midtown Safety Center	2949 Chicago Avenue	Minneapolis	The non-profit organization suffered heavy fire damage.	
	Midway Shopping Center	1360 University Avenue W	Saint Paul	Several stores in the shopping center, including a GameStop and Foot Locker, were damaged by the fire. The entire shopping center for 16 tenants was bulldozed, included store fronts for several minority-owned businesses within the shopping center that did not suffer fire damage. Prior plans were advanced to redevelop the shopping center as a mixed-use residential and commercial district, which is located adjacent to Allianz Field soccer stadium.	
	Migizi	3017 27th Avenue S	Minneapolis	The Native American non-profit youth organization's building was destroyed by fire on May 29, 2020. Thought it was not specifically targeted by arsonists, its building was affected by fires that spread from adjacent structures. Migizi raised $2 million from 30,000 donations in the fire's aftermath and relocated to 1845 East Lake Street in May 2022. The nearby Holy Trinity Lutheran Church purchased the property to prevent it from being acquired by outside investors with plans to transfer ownership to the Pangea World Theater after construction of a new building at the site in the mid-2020s.	
	Minneapolis Police Department Third Precinct	3000 Minnehaha Avenue	Minneapolis	The Minneapolis Police Department's Third Precinct has had a presence in the area since the 1950s. The station building was originally located near 27th Avenue and East Lake Street. In 1985, the precinct moved to a newly constructed building at East Lake Street and Minnehaha Avenue. It was designed with a public-facing entrance at the corner of two major streets. The station building became a focal point of demonstrations after the murder of George Floyd, with the first protests there occurring the evening of May 26, 2020. The station building was destroyed by fire after being overrun by demonstrators and torched on May 28 after police retreated from the area. After facing opposition to returning to the building, the city council approved a plan in late 2023 to relocated the third precinct forces to a new facility at 2633 Minnehaha Avenue. The city has not made a determination as to the next use of the property; an initial proposal to reuse the building as a "democracy center" has been delayed by council pending further community input, including a feedback sessionJ June 10.	
	Minnehaha Lake Wine & Spirits	2613 East Lake Street	Minneapolis	The liquor store was destroyed by fire on May 28, 2020, in rioting near the Minneapolis police third police precinct station.	
	Minnesota Transitions Charter (MTC) School	2872 26th Avenue S, Suite B	Minneapolis	Part of Minnehaha Mall shopping center, the school property sustained major damage by looting, fire, and water. A $17.4 million renovation project was completed in 2022.	
	Mirasol Express	719 East Lake Street	Minneapolis	The commercial building was destroyed by fire.	
	MoneyGram	2701 East Lake Street	Minneapolis	The business was in the multi-use commercial building at 27th Avenue and East Lake Street that was destroyed by fire the night of May 28, 2020.	
	NAPA Auto Parts	1271 University Avenue W	Saint Paul	Located in a commercial building on the 1200 block of University Avenue, the auto parts store was destroyed by fire during the overnight hours on May 28 to 29, 2020. The landlord decided not to rebuild.	
	Neighbors One Stop	3759 Penn Ave N	Minneapolis	The gas station was destroyed by fire.	
	Nickel Joint Sports Bar	501 Blair Avenue	Saint Paul	A dumpster was lit on fire at the bar building.	
	Nguyen Architects	2637 27th Avenue S	Minneapolis	Embers from the fire at the Hexagon Bar ignited the Ivy Building on fire. The architectural firm's office was destroyed.	
	O'Reilly Auto Parts	710 East Lake Street	Minneapolis	The autoparts store was destroyed by fire.	
	O'Reilly Auto Parts	1625 West Broadway Avenue	Minneapolis	The autoparts store was destroyed by fire.	
	O'Reilly Auto Parts	2204 East Lake Street	Minneapolis	Located in the Hi-Lake shopping center that was deemed a total loss due to fire, the auto parts store was among the stores demolished.	
	O'Reilly Auto Parts	448 Lexington Parkway N	Saint Paul	The auto parts store was torched twice and suffered fire damage.	
	O'Reilly Auto Parts	3536 Nicollet Avenue	Minneapolis	The auto parts store, located next to Family Dollar on the same parcel, was destroyed by fires set in the early morning hours on May 30, 2020, after protests the night before intensified around the Minneapolis police fifth precinct building. The site was redeveloped into an apartment building.	
	Office Depot	3001 Nicollet Avenue S	Minneapolis	The office supply store suffered fire and water damage.	
	Olympic Café	2117 West Broadway Avenue	Minneapolis	The Mediterranean restaurant was destroyed by fire.	
	Olympic Café	923 West Broadway Avenue	Minneapolis	The Black-owned Mediterranean restaurant was part of several store fronts on the 900 block of West Broadway Avenue that were destroyed by arsonists. In early 2020, the business owner had dropped insurance coverage due to financial difficulties caused by the COVID-19 pandemic. In the months after the riots, the owner was unable to recover her losses and sought other forms of financial aid.	
	Paraiso Lounge	2709 East Lake Street	Minneapolis	The Latin dance club was in the former Odd Fellows buildings, a multi-use historic structure near the intersection of 27th Avenue and East Lake Street that was destroyed by fire during the overnight hours of May 28, 2020.	
	Peking Garden	1488 University Avenue W	Saint Paul	The Chinese restaurant had smoke and water damage. With the assistance of grant money, the owners relocated to another property location in Saint Paul.	
	Photo Letter Project	2637 27th Avenue S, Suite 106	Minneapolis	Located in the Ivy Building for Arts, the business suffered heavy water and fire damage.	
	Physician's Group	2210 East Lake Street	Minneapolis	Located in the Hi-Lake shopping center, the health care company was destroyed by fire.	
	Pineda Tacos	2130 East Lake Street	Minneapolis	Rioters attempted to set fires inside the restaurant the night of May 27, 2020, but the fires were suppressed by the building's sprinkler system.	
	Popeyes	2906 Chicago Avenue	Minneapolis	The restaurant was destroyed by fire. The address was also reported as at 2918 Chicago Avenue.	
	Quality Tobacco	112 East Lake Street	Minneapolis	The tobacco store suffered extensive fire damage.	
	Quruxley	2913 27th Avenue S	Minneapolis	The restaurant was among the tenants at Minnehaha Crossing that suffered damages during the riots.	
	Residence	2840 27th Avenue S	Minneapolis	The night of May 28, 2020, heat from the fire at Midtown Corner, an under-construction apartment building, melted siding off the house.	
	Residence	3008 Colfax Avenue S	Minneapolis	The house had fire damage.	
	Rongo's Auto Service	3548 Nicollet Avenue	Minneapolis	The vehicle repair shop was destroyed by fire. The city reported the address as 3648 Nicollet Avenue.	
	Santamaria Broadcasting	3003 27th Avenue S, Suite 400	Minneapolis	The media company was in the former Odd Fellows buildings, a multi-use historic structure near the intersection of 27th Avenue and East Lake Street that was destroyed by fire during the overnight hours of May 28, 2020.	
	Schubert & Hoey Outdoor Advertising	2747 26th Avenue S	Minneapolis	The business was destroyed by fire.	
	Schooner Tavern	2901 27th Avenue S	Minneapolis	Overnight on May 29 into May 30, the bar was looted and suffered modest damage from fire and water. Residents that lived above the bar had to be evacuated and taken to safety shelters.	
	Score Sports Bar	2713 East Lake Street	Minneapolis	The Black-owned establishment that was to replace Addis Ababa restaurant was in the commercial building at 27th Avenue and East Lake Street that was destroyed by fire the night of May 28, 2020. In mid 2021, the owners announced plans to re-locate the business to another location in Minneapolis.	
	Seafood to Go	2930 Chicago Avenue	Minneapolis	The seafood restaurant was destroyed by fire.	
	Seward Pharmacy	2209 East Lake Street	Minneapolis	On May 27, 2020, the independent pharmacy was looted of its cash safe and medications with a fire being set inside, which resulted in about $500,000 of damages.	
	Shell	640 East Lake Street	Minneapolis	The gas station was destroyed by fire. The minority-owned franchise location was looted and burned the night of May 29, 2022. Losses were not fully covered by insurance and the owners sought out other forms of financial aid for recovery.	
	Shoff Chiropractic	2621 East Lake Street	Minneapolis	The chiropractic office was destroyed by fire.	
	Smart Stop	3759 N Penn Avenue	Minneapolis	The gas station was destroyed by fire.	
	Snelling Avenue Fine Wines	500 Snelling Avenue N	Saint Paul	The wine shop had fire damage.	
	Sonoma Enterprises	3003 27th Avenue S, Suite 400	Minneapolis	The business was in the multi-use commercial building at 27th Avenue and East Lake Street that was destroyed by fire the night of May 28, 2020.	
	Speedway	2501 Hennepin Avenue	Minneapolis	The gas station had fire damage.	
	Speedway	4740 Cedar Avenue S	Minneapolis	The gas station had major fire damage.	
	Speedway	5101 34th Avenue S	Minneapolis	The gas station had fire damage.	
	Speedway	2051 Grand Avenue	Saint Paul	The gas station was destroyed by fire.	
	Speedway	399 Lexington Parkway N	Saint Paul	The gas station suffered fire damage.	
	Speedway	950 Lexington Parkway N	Saint Paul	The gas station suffered fire damage.	
	Speedway	717 Snelling Avenue N	Saint Paul	The gas station suffered fire damage.	
	Speedway	801 West Lake Street	Minneapolis	The LynLake gas station had fire and water damage.	
	Speedway	970 University Avenue W	Saint Paul	The gas station suffered severe fire damage.	
	Sports Dome	1505 University Avenue W	Saint Paul	The clothing store was set ablaze during the overnight hours from May 28 to 29, 2020. The heavily damaged building was later demolished.	
	Springboard for the Arts	262 University Avenue W	Saint Paul	The non-profit organization's building had fire damage.	
	Sprint	3009 Nicollet Avenue	Minneapolis	The store suffered property damage. Matthew Lee Rupert of Galesburg, Illinois, pled guilty to a federal arson charge for directing a juvenile companion to light a small fire inside the store.	
	Stop N Shop	3050 1st Avenue S	Minneapolis	The convenience store and strip mall suffered fire damage on May 29, 2020.	
	Subway	3043 Nicollet Avenue	Minneapolis	The restaurant was destroyed by fire the night of May 29, 2020. The city reported the address as 3030 Nicollet Avenue.	
	T-Mobile	800 East Lake Street	Minneapolis	The cellphone store suffered severe fire damage.	
	TJ Maxx	1410 University Avenue W	Saint Paul	The clothing store suffered damage from a small fire.	
	Target	2500 East Lake Street	Minneapolis	The Lake Street Target store had fire damage. The store reopened in November 2020. Target Corporation did not publicly disclose the cost of renovations.	
	Target	1300 University Avenue W	Saint Paul	The Midway Target store had minor fire damage.	
	Teppanyaki Grill and Supreme Buffet	2216 East Lake Street	Minneapolis	The Japanese restaurant had fire damage.	
	Thien's Cajun Boiling Seafood	1464 University Avenue W	Saint Paul	The seafood restaurant suffered smoke and water damage. It reopened in 2021 as King Cajun at another building on University Avenue.	
	TJ Nails	598 University Avenue W	Saint Paul	The beauty salon suffered water damage.	
	Tom's Barber and Styling Shop	2142 N 44th Avenue	Minneapolis	The barbershop had severe fire damage.	
	Total Wireless	2130 East Lake Street, Suite A	Minneapolis	The cellphone store had fire damage.	
	Town Talk Diner & Gastropub	2707 East Lake Street	Minneapolis	The landmark diner was in the multi-use commercial building at 27th Avenue and East Lake Street that was destroyed by fire the night of May 28, 2020, after police vacated the third police precinct building and abandoned the East Lake Street area. The owners filed a lawsuit against the city for $4.5 million in early 2021.	
	Turf Club	1601 University Avenue W	Saint Paul	At 1 a.m. on May 29, the fire alarm system activated and the music club suffered damage from fire suppressant waters. It was unclear if the fire alarms and sprinklers were activated by fires in the area or by a deliberate fire inside the club.	
	Tweak The Glam Studio	611 West Lake Street	Minneapolis	The beauty salon suffered fire damage.	
	TwinCare Dental (also reported as Twin Lake Dental)	2228 East Lake Street	Minneapolis	The dental office had fire damage.	
	U-7 Nails	2928 Chicago Avenue	Minneapolis	The beauty salon suffered severe fire damage.	
	U-Haul	2148 N 44th Avenue	Minneapolis	The truck rental business was located in the structure with Boost Mobile, Mailbox Solutions Plus, and Tomb's Barber that was damaged by fire.	
	U.S. Bank	919 East Lake Street	Minneapolis	The bank suffered heavy fire damage. A new bank structure at the site re-opened in mid 2022.	
	U.S. Bank	2800 East Lake Street	Minneapolis	The bank building suffered severe property damage from fire. U.S. Bank donated the land to Seward Redesign so it could be rebuilt as an affordable housing and mixed use project.	
	U.S. Post Office	110 E 31st Street	Minneapolis	The Lyndale Post Office, a USPS branch near Nicollet Avenue, was destroyed by fire during the riots along the Nicollet Avenue corridor the night of May 29, 2020. The post office relocated temporarily to a former Kmart building. After being rebuilt, the post office reopened in its original location on October 11, 2022.	
	U.S. Post Office	3033 27th Avenue S	Minneapolis	The Longfellow Post Office, a USPS branch in a leased building, was destroyed by fire on May 28, 2020, in rioting near the Minneapolis police third police precinct station. The private company that owned the property sold it to the U.S. Postal Service in October 2022. A newly constructed post office reopened at the same location in June 2023.	
	Uncle Hugo's Science Fiction Bookstore and Uncle Edgar's Mystery Bookstore	2864 Chicago Avenue	Minneapolis	The independent bookstores were destroyed by fire on May 30, 2020, after someone gained entry to the building at approximately 3:00 a.m. The building and about $1.3 million in inventory were lost. Instead of rebuilding at its former location, the bookstores relocated to 2716 East 31st Street in Minneapolis in 2022.	
	Unnamed building	2935 Chicago Avenue	Minneapolis	The building was destroyed by fire. Plans to build a mixed-use project at the corner of Chicago Avenue and East Lake Street were announced in mid 2021.	
	Unnamed building	906 Hennepin Avenue	Minneapolis	The building was affected by fire.	
	Unnamed building	714 East Lake Street	Minneapolis	An automobile repair building next to O'Reilly Auto Parts was destroyed by fire.	
	Unnamed businesses	315 East Lake Street	Minneapolis	Multiple business along the 300 block of East Lake Street had fire damage.	
	Unnamed building	2716 East Lake Street	Minneapolis	The office building adjacent to Coliseum building was severely damaged by fire.	
	Unnamed building	2616 E 29th Street	Minneapolis	The mixed-use warehouse building near 7-Sigma, Inc. was destroyed by fire.	
	Urban 29	804 East Lake Street	Minneapolis	The Black-owned clothing store was destroyed by fire. The business relocated temporarily to the Mall of America while it prepared for a more permanent space in Saint Paul.	
	Walgreens	200 West Lake Street	Minneapolis	The pharmacy suffered major fire damage.	
	Walgreens	3121 East Lake Street	Minneapolis	The pharmacy was destroyed by fire.	
	Walgreens	5428 Lyndale Avenue S	Minneapolis	The pharmacy suffered major fire damage.	
	Walgreens	1585 Randolph Avenue	Saint Paul	The pharmacy suffered fire and water damage.	
	Walgreens	627 West Broadway Avenue	Minneapolis	The pharmacy had fire damage.	
	Watson Chiropractic	2110 West Broadway	Minneapolis	Molotov cocktails thrown onto the roof caused $100,000 in damages to the multi-use building. Insurance payments did not cover riot damages. The property owner received grants from West Broadway Business and Area Coalition to pay for repairs.	
	Wells Fargo	3030 Nicollet Avenue	Minneapolis	The bank was destroyed by fire the night of May 29, 2020. Wells Fargo announced plans to build a 110-unit, affordable housing building on the property at Lake Street and Nicollet Avenue in 2021. Project for Pride in Living began construction in 2022 of a $50 million-plus project.	
	Wells Fargo	2218 East Lake Street	Minneapolis	The bank suffered fire damage.	
	Wells Fargo Home Mortgage	2650 Wells Fargo Way	Minneapolis	The office building suffered major fire damage on May 29, 2020.	
	Wendy's	2931 26th Avenue S	Minneapolis	The fast-food restaurant was destroyed by fire. The restaurant chain returned to the location in 2021 after construction of a new building.	

== Death ==
This list includes local arson-related deaths in the five days after Floyd's murder.

Name	Residence	Death Location	Description	Ref.
Oscar Lee Stewart Jr.	Burnsville, Minnesota	Max It Pawn; East Lake Street; Minneapolis	Stewart was trapped inside the pawn shop as it was set ablaze the night of May 28, 2020. Bystanders and Minneapolis firefighters were unable to rescue him due to the deteriorating conditions of the structure. Stewart's body was not recovered in the ruins until July 20, 2020. Montez T. Lee Jr. later pleaded guilty to a federal arson charge for the fire at the pawn shop, but authorities believed that he was unaware that Lee was trapped inside.	

== Criminal charges ==
In the United States, arson is classified as both a federal and state crime. Federal authorities assisted state and local authorities in tracking and investigating acts of arson that occurred during the George Floyd protests. Authorities, however, had difficulty identifying those responsible for causing arson damage. Investigations were prioritized for damage to structures with the most readily available evidence. Federal authorities brought criminal charges against 19 people, but two later had their charges dropped. Of the number of people with lasting charges, 15 out of the 17 were from Minnesota, but just three were from either the cities of Minneapolis or Saint Paul. Many of the acts of arson that resulted in criminal charges were those that were livestreamed or posted on social media accounts by the arsonists.

Assigning who was responsible for the damage became a topic of political debate. Right-wing politicians blamed Antifa and radical leftists. Left-wing politicians blamed white supremacists and drug cartels. An FBI analysis of state and federal criminal charges, however, found that disorganized crowds had no single goal or affiliation, many opportunist crowds amassed spontaneously during periods of lawlessness, and that people causing destruction had contradictory motives for their actions. Of all of those charged for arson-related crimes, only one charging document noted any ties to an extremist organization—the Boogaloo movement. The majority of those charged federally for arson crimes were described by local newspapers as White Americans who had contradictory motives for their actions.

This list includes federal convictions for arson and arson-related acts in the five days after Floyd's murder.

Name	Residence	Arson location(s)	Description	Ref.
Matthew Lee Rupert	Galesburg, Illinois	Sprint	Rupert pleaded guilty to one federal count of arson for the fire at the Sprint store on Nicollet Avenue in Minneapolis the night of May 28, 2020. He was sentenced in August 2021 to 8.5-year prison sentence and three years of supervised release.	
Garret Patrick Ziegler	Long Lake, Minnesota	Dakota County Western Service Center	He was one of two people charged with firebombing the Dakota County government service center in Apple Valley on May 29, 2020, during the unrest. Ziegler pleaded guilty to one count of adding and abetting arson. He was sentenced to five years in prison and three years of supervised released and ordered to each pay $206,000 in restitution.	
Fornandous Cortez Henderson	Savage, Minnesota	Dakota County Western Service Center	He was one of two people charged with firebombing the Dakota County government service center in Apple Valley on May 29, 2020, during the unrest. Henderson admitted in court that he chose the facility as he had made court appearances there and because he was angry over the murder of Floyd. He pleaded guilty to arson and was sentenced to six years in prison in 2021 and ordered to pay $206,000 in restitution.	
Branden Michael Wolfe	Saint Paul, Minnesota	Minneapolis Police Department Third Precinct Station	A large crowd surrounding the police station building the night of May 28, 2020, when it was overrun and set on fire. Wolfe pleaded guilty and received a three-and-a-half-year prison sentence for the arson charge and was ordered to pay $12 million in restitution.	
Samuel Elliott Frey	Brooklyn Park, Minnesota	Great Health Nutrition	Frey was part of a crowd that broke into the Great Health Nutrition store near University Avenue in Saint Paul on May 28, 2020, and set it on fire. Frey pleaded guilty to conspiracy to commit arson. In January 2022, he was sentenced to 27 months in prison and ordered to pay $33,827 in restitution.	
McKenzy Ann DeGidio Dunn	Rosemount, Minnesota	Great Health Nutrition	Dunn was part of a crowd that broke into the Great Health Nutrition store in Saint Paul on May 28, 2020, and set it on fire. Dunn pleaded guilty to conspiracy to commit arson. In July 2021, she was sentenced to 180 days of home confinement and three years probation and ordered to pay $31,000 in restitution.	
Montez Terriel Lee Jr.	Rochester, Minnesota	Max It Pawn	Lee pleaded guilty to an arson charge for the fire at the Max It Pawn store on East Lake Street in Minneapolis on May 28, 2020. Surveillance video that night captured him pouring an accelerant around the shop and lighting it on fire. In early 2022, he was sentenced to 10 years in prison. Oscar Lee Stewart Jr. was killed in the fire, but authorities believed that Lee was unaware that Stewart was trapped inside.	
Dylan Robinson	Brainerd, Minnesota	Minneapolis Police Department Third Precinct Station	A large crowd surrounding the police station building the night of May 28, 2020, when it was overrun and set on fire. Robinson pleaded guilty and received a four-year prison sentence for the arson charge and he was ordered to pay $12 million in restitution.	
Bryce Michael Williams	Staples, Minnesota	Minneapolis Police Department Third Precinct Station	A large crowd surrounding the police station building the night of May 28, 2020, when it was overrun and set on fire. Williams pleaded guilty and received a three-year prison sentence for the arson charge and was ordered to pay $12 million in restitution.	
Matthew Scott White	Saint Paul, Minnesota	Enterprise Rent-A-Car	White pleaded guilty to one act of arson for starting a fire at a rental car building on University Avenue in Saint Paul that was entirely destroyed by fire on May 28, 2020. White was sentenced to 72 months imprisonment in June 2021.	
Mohamed Hussein Abdi	Maplewood, Minnesota	Multiple locations: Gordon Parks High School; Discount Tire	Abdi aided Jose A. Felan Jr. in setting fires inside Gordon Parks High School on University Avenue in Saint Paul. He also attempted to set fires at the nearby Discount Tire store. Abdi pleaded guilty in March 2021 to conspiracy to commit arson. In February 2022, he was sentenced to five years of probation and ordered to pay $34,000 in restitution.	
Alexander Steven Heil	Monticello, Minnesota	Wells Fargo Bank	Heil was part of a large crowd that surrounded the Wells Fargo Bank the night of May 28, 2020. He pleaded guilty to conspiracy to commit arson for helping fuel fires. He was sentenced to two years in prison in mid 2021.	
Marc Bell Gonzales	Wayzata, Minnesota	Wells Fargo Bank	Gonzales was part of a large crowd that surrounded the Wells Fargo Bank the night of May 28, 2020. He pleaded guilty to conspiracy to commit arson for helping set the structure on fire. He was sentenced to 37 months in prison in mid 2021.	
Davon De-Andre Turner	Saint Paul, Minnesota	Minneapolis Police Department Third Precinct Station	A large crowd surrounding the police station building the night of May 28, 2020, when it was overrun and set on fire. Williams pleaded guilty and received a three-year prison sentence for the arson charge and he was ordered to pay $12 million in restitution.	
Jose A. Felan Jr.	Rochester, Minnesota	Multiple locations: 7 Mile Sportswear; Goodwill; Gordon Parks High School; Napa Auto Parts	Federal authorities alleged that Felan was responsible for several fires on University Avenue in Saint Paul on May 28, 2020. Felan and Mohamed Hussein Abdi set fires inside Gordon Parks High School. Felan was also captured on security cameras entering and existing the nearby Napa Auto Parts and Goodwill stores on University Avenue. Authorities said he also had a role in the fire at 7-Mile Sportswear. Felan pleaded guilty to arson charges. A federal judge on October 18, 2022, sentenced him to 6.5 years in prison and ordered him to pay $40,000 in restitution.	
Mena Dyaha Yousif	Rochester, Minnesota		Yousif travelled to Saint Paul with Felan on May 28, 2020, and later helped him evade authorities. Felan committed several acts of arson to businesses and a school along the University Avenue corridor in Saint Paul. Yousif pleaded guilty to the charge of being an accessory after the fact to arson and was sentenced to three years of probation.	
Ivan Harrison Hunter	Boerne, Texas	Minneapolis Police Department Third Precinct Station	Hunter was a self-described leader of a local Boogaloo Movement group in Texas. Federal authorities charged him with one count of interstate travel to incite a riot for shooting 13 rounds from an AK-47-style machine gun into the Minneapolis third police precinct building while people were inside, looting it, and helping to set it on fire the night of May 28, 2020. Hunter pleaded guilty in September 2021 and was sentenced to four years in prison in April 2022.	

== See also ==
- Fire investigation
- List of incidents of civil unrest in Minneapolis–Saint Paul
- Minneapolis Fire Department
- National Register of Historic Places listings in Hennepin County, Minnesota
- Violence and controversies during the George Floyd protests
