= Hennepin County Medical Center =

- Hennepin Healthcare

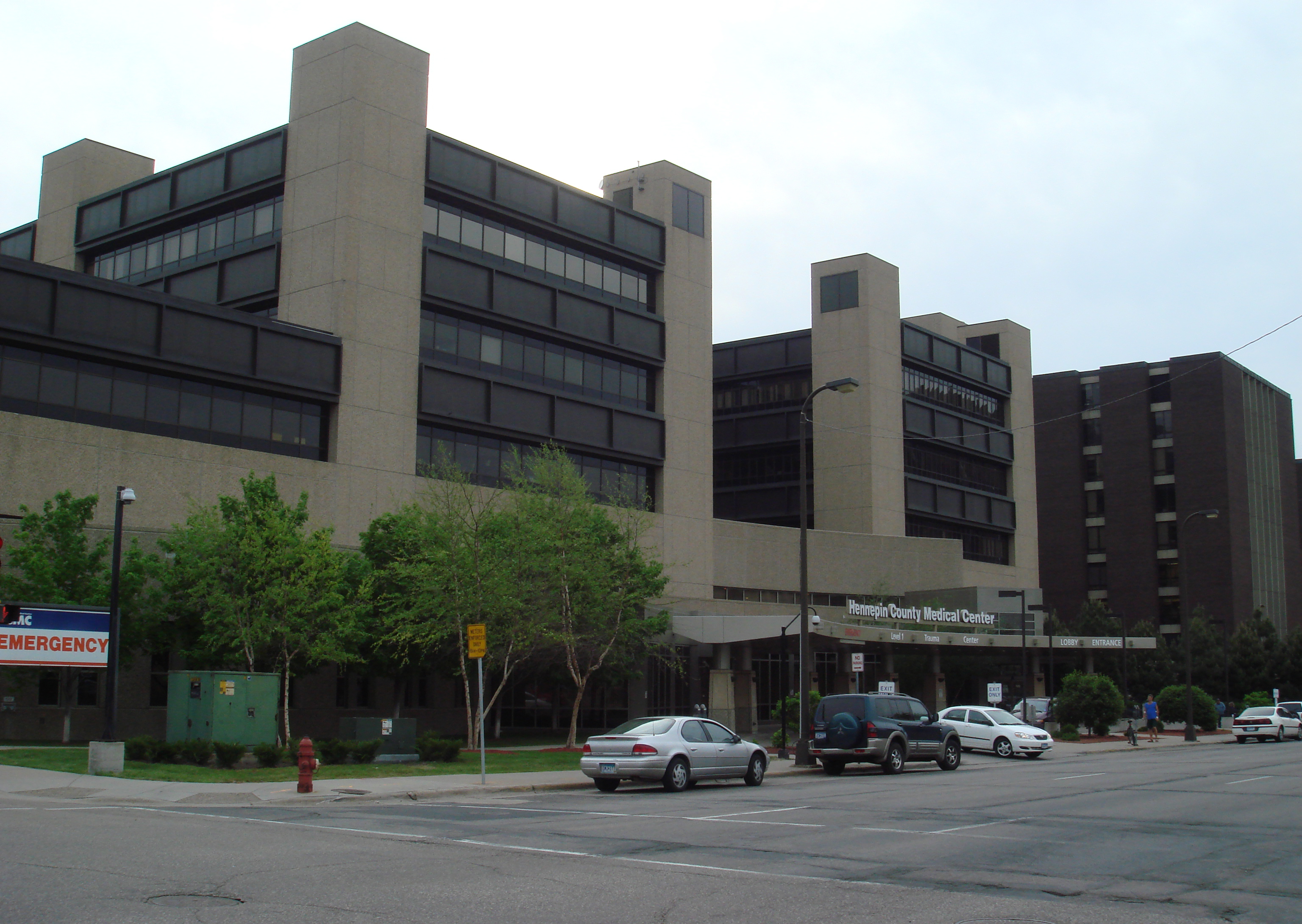
- Main entrance of HCMC. Hennepin Healthcare covers six city blocks.

Geography
- Location: 701 PARK AVENUE, Minneapolis, Hennepin County, Minnesota, United States
- Coordinates: 44°58′21″N 93°15′43″W

Organization
- Type: Teaching
- Affiliated university: University of Minnesota

Services
- Emergency department: Level I trauma center
- Beds: 484

History
- Former names: Minneapolis City Hospital, Hennepin County General Hospital, Hennepin County Medical Center
- Opened: 1887 as Minneapolis City Hospital; March 2018 as Hennepin Healthcare

Links
- Website: www.hennepinhealthcare.org
- Lists: Hospitals in Minnesota

Hennepin County Medical Center (HCMC) is a Level I adult and pediatric trauma center and safety net hospital in Minneapolis, Minnesota, the county seat of Hennepin County. The primary 484-bed facility is on six city blocks across the street from U.S. Bank Stadium, with neighborhood clinics in the Minneapolis Whittier and East Lake neighborhoods, and the suburban communities of Brooklyn Center, Brooklyn Park, Golden Valley, St. Anthony and Richfield. A new clinic in the North Loop neighborhood downtown opened in 2017. HCMC has recognized trauma surgery specialists, transplant services, stroke specialists, advanced endoscopy/hepatobilliary center, and hyperbaric oxygen chamber. A new outpatient clinic building opened in 2018. In March 2018, the provider that operates HCMC was rebranded as Hennepin Healthcare. However, the hospital retained the name HCMC.

== History ==
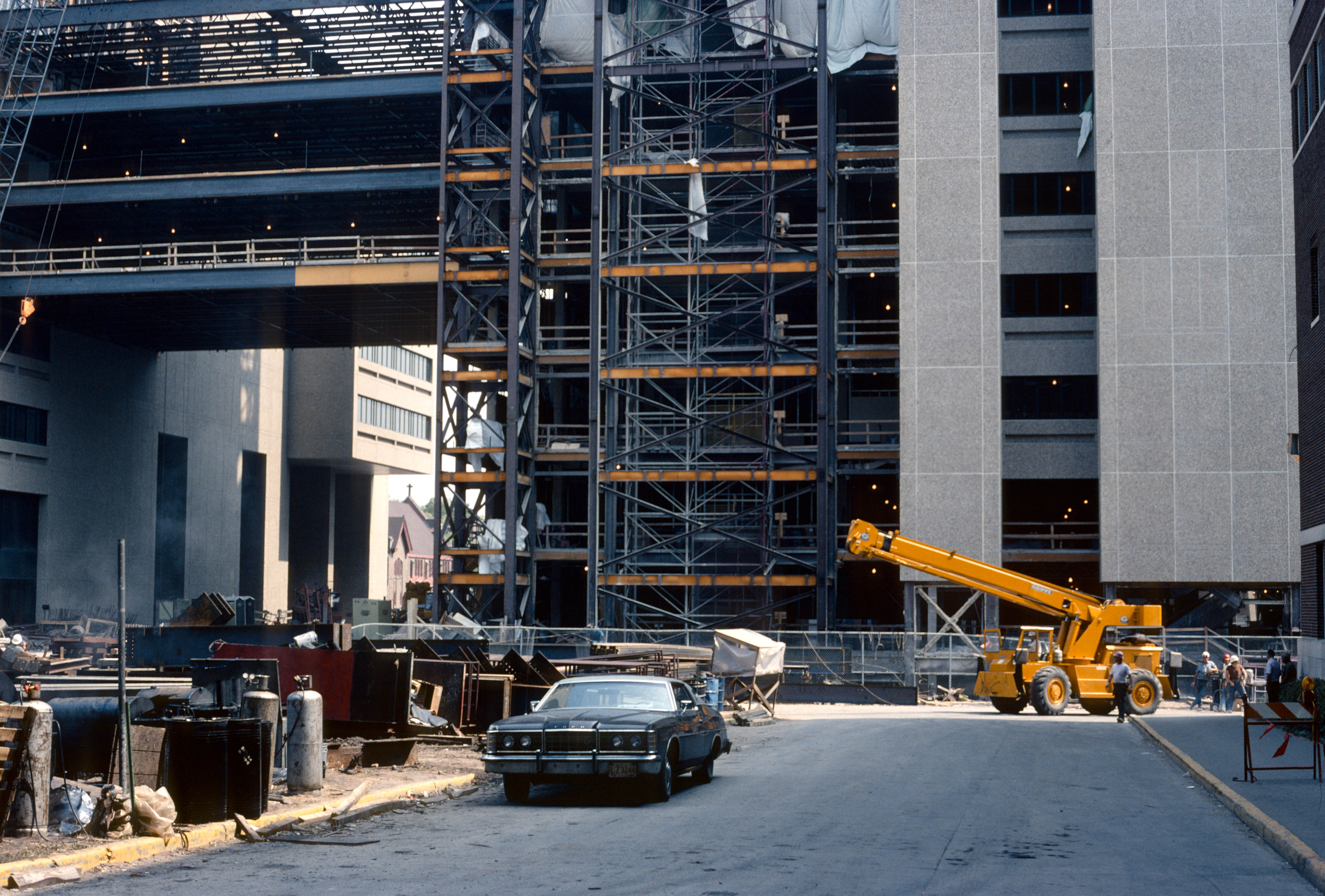
Construction of building in 1976

The original hospital building, established in 1887 as Minneapolis City Hospital, before being referred to as "General Hospital" or "City Hospital", sat a block from its current main location. Ownership was transferred to the county in 1964, when it was renamed Hennepin County General Hospital. The hospital took its current name in 1974. By the late 1960s, the hospital was a disorganized patchwork of buildings, leading to the decision to clear and rebuild the facility. The current hospital facility was completed in 1976 and renamed Hennepin County Medical Center, following a $25 million bond passed by voters in 1969. The hospital expanded in 1991 when the adjacent Metropolitan-Mount Sinai Medical Center closed. It gained Level I trauma center status in 1989, the first such site in the state.

The hospital underwent a governance change in January 2007, which created a new governing entity with greater autonomy from the county government. The hospital's public mission did not change, but this transition was made to ensure the long-term viability of the hospital. In 2012, the hospital partnered with NorthPoint Health and Wellness Center, Metropolitan Health Plan, and Hennepin County's Human Services and Public Health Department to form an accountable care organization called Hennepin Health. By February 2013, Hennepin Health had enrolled 6,000 clients.

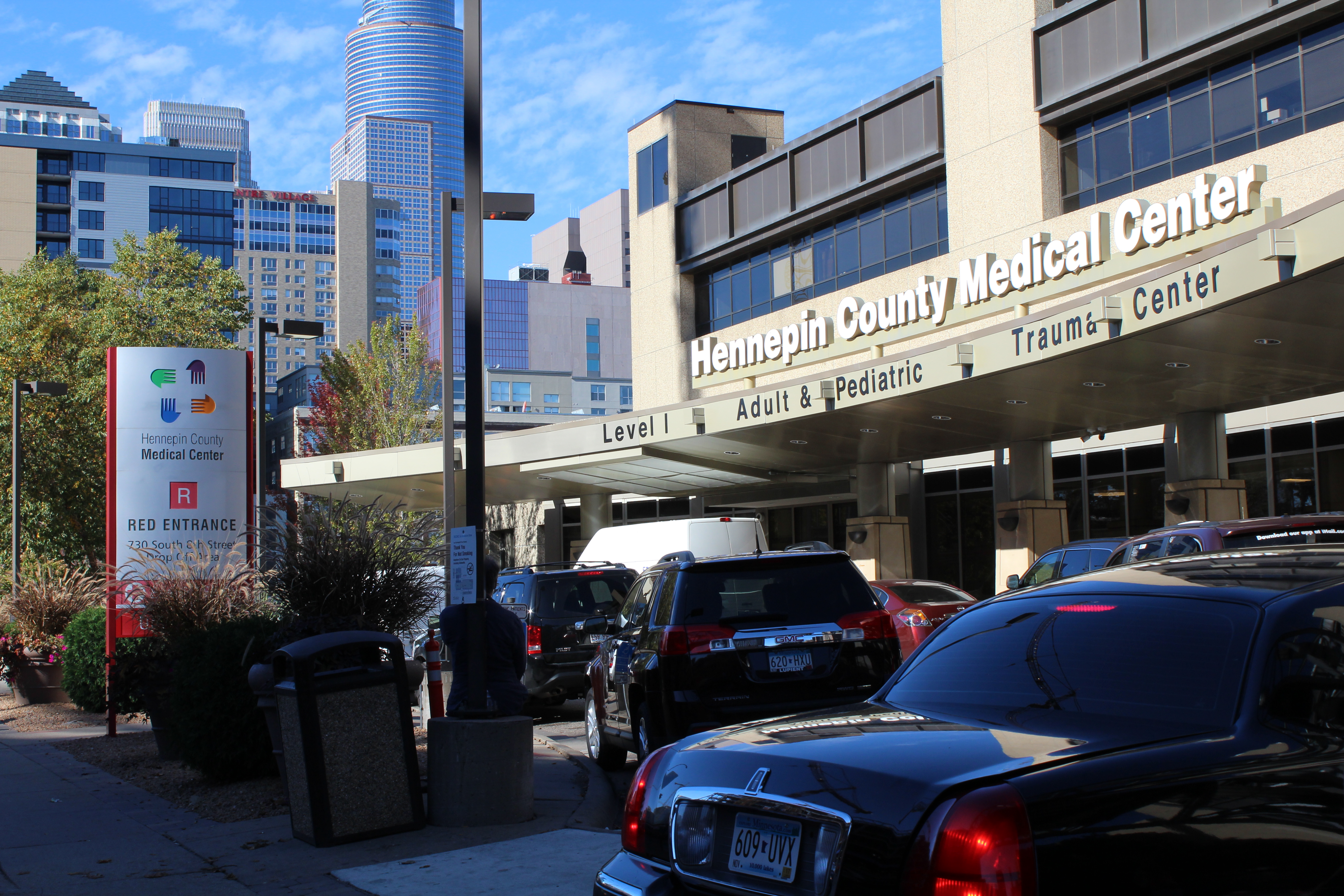
Main entrance at midday on a weekday.

In 2015, the Hennepin County Board allocated $192 million for a new outpatient center which features multiple clinics across from the HCMC entrance. The building opened in March 2018. In 2018, HCMC became Hennepin Healthcare.

In 2022, the Hennepin Healthcare safety net counted 626,000 in-person and 50,586 virtual clinic visits, and 87,731 emergency room visits.

Hennepin Healthcare's East Lake Clinic in the historic Coliseum Building and Hall was among the property locations damaged by arson during the George Floyd protests in Minneapolis–Saint Paul. A Molotov cocktail was thrown through a window in the overnight hours of May 30, 2020, destroying the clinic.

== Residency programs ==
HCMC has independent residency programs in dentistry, pharmacy practice, emergency medicine, internal medicine, combined internal medicine/emergency medicine, family medicine, general surgery, podiatric surgery, and psychiatry. In addition, it is a rotating site for many programs from the University of Minnesota, including orthopedic surgery, urology, oral and maxillofacial surgery, otolaryngology, ophthalmology, neurosurgery, neurology, obstetrics/gynecology, pediatrics, radiology, dietetics, and many medical subspecialty fellowships. It has independent fellowships in geriatrics, critical care medicine, sleep medicine and nephrology.

NASA astronaut Kjell Lindgren is a graduate of the Emergency Medicine residency program (2002–2005). He was selected to NASA's 20th astronaut class in 2009, and spent 141 days in space on Expedition 44/45 in 2015.

== Emergency medical services ==
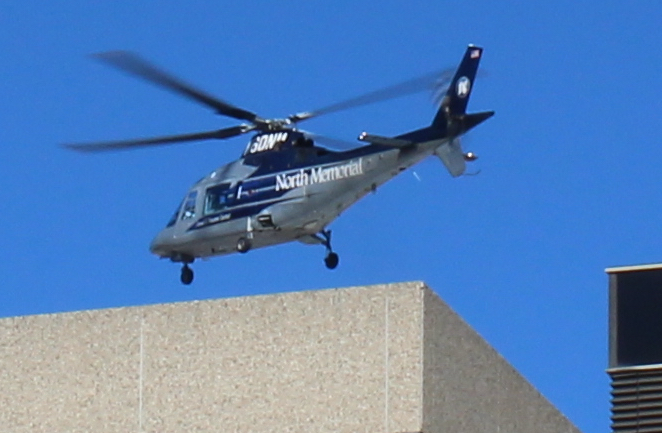
Air ambulance landing at HCMC in downtown Minneapolis

HCMC also provides emergency medical services (Hennepin EMS) for the cities of Minneapolis, Golden Valley, Shorewood, Eden Prairie, St. Louis Park, Hopkins, St. Anthony, Woodland, Excelsior, Deephaven, Tonka Bay, Richfield, and the majority of the city of Minnetonka. Hennepin EMS uses 37 type III ambulances, 6 medical director vehicles, 3 Community Paramedic vehicles and 2 EMS Command units in its fleet. All 911 response vehicles are equipped with handheld ultrasound, video laryngoscopes, LUCAS device and Zoll-X series cardiac monitors. Two nationally certified paramedics staff each rig. Hennepin EMS logs over 100,000 911 calls every year from an urban/suburban population base of roughly 900,000. Hennepin EMS is also home to an ACGME Accredited EMS Fellowship.
