= CTRN =

CTRN may refer to one of the following

- The NASDAQ symbol for Citi Trends
- Confederación de Trabajadores Rerum Novarum, Costa Rican Confederation of Workers, a Costa Rican trade union centre.
- Central of Tennessee Railway and Navigation Company
- A French-language abbreviation for Transitional Committee for National Recovery in Guinea (1991); see, e.g., Lansana Conté article.
