= Gordon Parks High School =

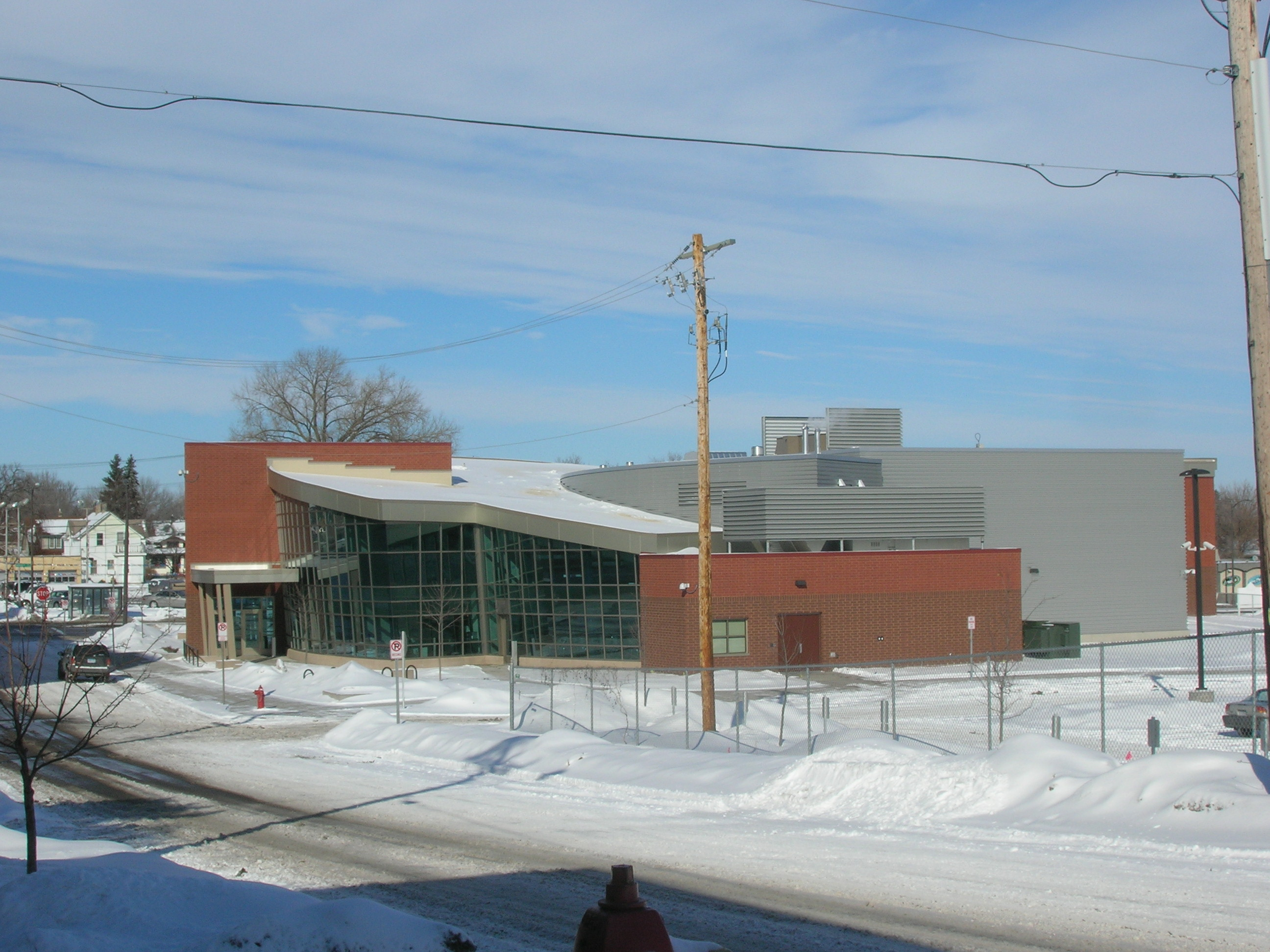

Location
- 1212 University Avenue; Saint Paul, Minnesota; United States; 44°57′19″N 93°9′5″W

Information
- Type: Alternative Learning Center
- Established: 1991
- School district: Saint Paul Public Schools
- Principal: Traci Gauer
- Teaching staff: 14.38 (FTE)
- Ages: 16-20 years
- Enrollment: 217 (2024–2025)
- Student to teacher ratio: 15.09
- Campus: Urban
- Website: www.spps.org/gordonparks

Gordon Parks High School is a public alternative learning center in Saint Paul, Minnesota, United States. The school, founded in 1991, was originally the Saint Paul Area Learning Center. It was then called Unidale Alternative Learning Center for several years, after the local strip mall it operated in; this was often shortened to ALC Unidale. In 2007, a permanent building was built for the school and it was again renamed. The school serves high-school-age students categorized as "at risk" or far behind in grade level. It is the largest of seven alternative day school programs in the Saint Paul Public Schools district.

== Campus ==
The Saint Paul Area Learning Center opened on February 1, 1991. Its initial student body consisted of 500 full and part-time students. The school first opened in a leased 8,000 square feet (740 m^{2}) building in the Unidale Mall. The small space was repeatedly expanded; the largest expansion was in 1997, when the building grew by 6,000 square feet (560 m^{2}). Eventually, the building reached 18,000 square feet (1,700 m^{2}). The school, with tiny classrooms and no windows, cost the school district $300,000 in rent a year. The rented space became too small, and the school district decided to build a new building in part because of pressure from developers of the mall.

Upon the school's relocation suggestions were solicited for a new name, and social studies teacher Ted Johnson submitted the winning entry. The school was named after photographer, film director and local icon Gordon Parks. Parks grew up in Saint Paul, attending local high schools such as Mechanic Arts High School and Saint Paul Central. Like many of the students the school targets, Parks struggled with events outside of school and eventually dropped out.

=== New building ===
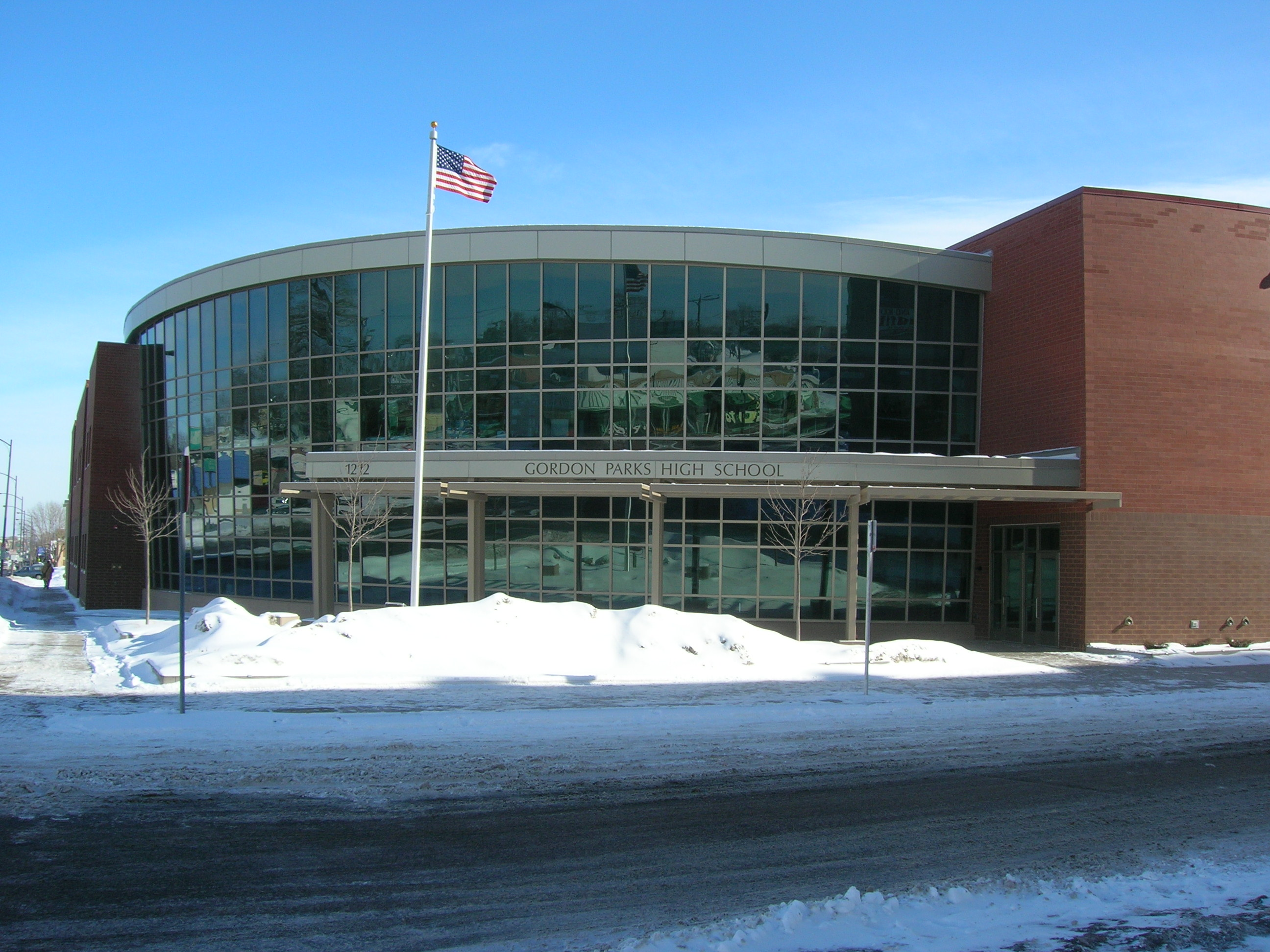
Front entrance with sloping glass walls

In 2003, Saint Paul Public Schools purchased a parcel of land about a mile and half west of the Unidale Mall on University Avenue from 3M. Construction of the new facility was planned to start in 2005, costing $7 million. When construction bids were higher than expected, the price tag went up to $8 million and the project was postponed to allow for planning to reduce costs. Construction started in late November 2006 after price concerns had been resolved. The building opened in early December 2007, with a total cost of $7.5 million. It was dedicated one day before the second anniversary of Gordon Parks's death. He died on March 7, 2006; the building was dedicated on March 6, 2008.

When the new building was proposed, the initial plan called for a 44,000 square feet (4,100 m^{2}) facility. The finished product featured a new gym and cafeteria in a 34,000 square feet (3,200 m^{2}) building. Ownership of the new facility is saving the Saint Paul Public Schools district $300,000 annually in rent. The building also has new science labs, computer labs, and bigger art and industrial technology areas.

The building was designed by Wold Architects and built by Jorgenson Construction, Inc. The sloping glass walls in the front entrance were designed to emulate the many car dealerships along University Avenue. The school was built to be environmentally friendly, and the school district intends to apply for a Leadership in Energy and Environmental Design Certification.

The building suffered arson damage during the George Floyd protests in Minneapolis–Saint Paul. Two men pleaded guilty to federal charges for setting fires inside the cafeteria on May 28, 2020, during the widespread civil unrest that followed the murder of George Floyd.

== Students ==
The school serves students aged 16–21. Students who enroll must qualify under one or more "at-risk" categories. These include homelessness, pregnancy, children and chemical dependency, as well as being at least one year behind for graduation or any other characteristic that would place a student at a disadvantage. In the 2006–07 school year roughly 279 students attended Gordon Parks High School. Sixty-two percent of students qualify for free or reduced lunch, which is the school district's measure of poverty. Eight percent of students qualify for special education.

== Academics ==
Students must finish school before turning 21 years old. In 2007, the school's 12-week trimesters were changed into smaller six-week mini-terms, and then in 2011, even smaller three-week terms in order to improve attendance. Students who miss more than three days in a three-week mini-term do not earn full high school credit. As a result of this change, attendance increased by 100%, though daily attendance is still about 50%. It takes 60 hours of class work to earn one credit.

The school has a closed campus. When students were free to come and go as they pleased, many would not return after leaving for lunch. Now students must arrive by 8 a.m. and remain until noon, or arrive by 1 p.m. and stay until 5 p.m. Exceptions are granted for students in job programs, or who must take care of their family. To meet student needs the school has social workers, counselors, special education teachers, educational assistants, and on-the-job training.

The school has developed a specific program focus that includes film, photography, writing, and art, using Gordon Parks's life as an inspiration and guide. In partnership with the Minnesota Historical Society, students are documenting stages of transition along University Avenue through the stories of elders, business owners, and residents affected by the METRO Green Line light-rail transit project. The students learn more about the neighborhood's history, document stories of the LRT project that might not otherwise be told, and share images that might not otherwise be seen.

This multiyear project is titled "Transitions: University Avenue" and is produced entirely by students, who began by documenting the controversial stage of pre-construction along the avenue. As the construction moved forward, the students created documentaries on area residents and businesses and the impact the LRT has on them. The goals are to preserve important history, increase awareness of this community in transition, and highlight the work of Gordon Parks High School students.

GPHS partners with the Human Rights Program at the University of Minnesota in a pilot creative writing curriculum called the Scribes Fellowship. Students develop writing skills and confidence by focusing on personal reflections on human rights that affect their community. Community/school gardens, sustainable agriculture and food justice are the first topics explored.
