= Walt Carr =

African-American cartoonist

- Born: Walter Carr, Jr. August 26, 1932 (age 94) Baltimore, Maryland, U.S.
- Area: Cartoonist
- Notable works: Just Us!
- Spouse: Queen

Walt Carr (born August 26, 1932) is an African-American cartoonist and illustrator known for his political cartoons on the Black perspective.

Carr's work has been published in such magazines as Playboy, Ebony, Negro Digest/Black World, Jet, and Players; as well as in numerous African-American newspapers, including The Washington Informer, the New Pittsburgh Courier, The Sacramento Observer, The Philadelphia Tribune, the Michigan Chronicle, the Cleveland Call and Post, and the Baltimore Afro-American.

== Early life ==
Born in Baltimore, Carr also spent part of his childhood in Philadelphia. Carr developed an interest in comics and art at an early age, even taking classes at the Philadelphia Museum of Art.

His father was involved with the African-American press and also wrote editorials for another paper, The Nitelifer. Both of his parents were politically active, even being arrested at a demonstration when Carr was a young teen. This family engagement with politics fed Carr's later work in the field of political cartoons.

== Career ==
Carr graduated from Morgan State College with an art degree.

He joined the Social Security Administration's Visual Graphics Section as an illustrator in 1960. While with the federal government, he freelanced for many years as a magazine illustrator. His Strictly for Laughs page was a long-running feature for Ebony magazine.

In 1993, he retired from his government job. Seeing a lack of the Black perspective in political cartoons, he shifted the focus of his work to these themes. As Carr has said, "You never saw Black and brown people on the editorial pages of mainstream press unless it was something negative or catastrophic. You never saw the Black spin, the Black narrative or our take on the Black condition in America." Publications that ran his strips included New York's The Village Voice and Cherry Hill, New Jersey's Courier-Post.

In 2019, Carr published Just Us (a play on the word "justice"), a collection of his work culled from more than 1,200 published cartoons. The book is divided into 9 sections: Obama, GOP, Racism, Crime, Sports, Cops, Youth/Education, Transition, and Entertainment.

== Controversy ==
In 2009, the Cleveland Call and Post published a Carr cartoon that portrayed State Senator Nina Turner as Aunt Jemima. The publication of the cartoon led to a spirited debate about the perceived offensiveness of the cartoon, as well as calls for apologies and/or resignations from the paper's leadership (which were not forthcoming).

== Personal life ==
Carr lives in Columbia, Maryland, with his wife, Queen.

== Bibliography ==
- Just Us! (Uptown Press, Inc., 2019) ISBN 978-1935911296, 193 pp.
