= Springboard for the Arts =

Non-profit arts organisation

Springboard for the Arts is a not-for-profit arts service organization based in Saint Paul, Minnesota and Fergus Falls Minnesota. Springboard for the Arts mission is "to support artists with the tools to make a living and a life, and to build just and equitable communities full of meaning, joy, and connection." They provides arts-related resources to independent artists and arts organizations including professional development education and workshops, fiscal sponsorship, micro-lending, health care resources, and career consultations.

== History ==
Originating in 1978 as a program of United Arts, it became an independent non-profit organization in 1991 under the name of Resources and Counseling for the Arts. The organization changed its name to Springboard for the Arts in 2002. Springboard also manages Minnesota Lawyers for the Arts (MnLA), the Minnesota chapter of Volunteer Lawyers for the Arts. Laura Zabel was Executive Director from 2005-2026.

In 2021 their universal basic income program for artists initiative was among the first in the nation, supporting working artists in St. Paul's Rondo and Frogtown neighborhoods. In 2024, the program expanded to include artists based in Minnesota's Otter Tail County, making it one of the longest running programs of its kind in the nation.

== Work ==
In 2007, Springboard for the Arts partnered with Minnesota Citizens for the Arts and the Minnesota Craft Council to produce the economic impact study Artists Count: An Economic Impact Study of Artists in Minnesota. Following this study, they purchased and converted a former auto showroom into a community hub called SpringBOX.
