= Coliseum Building and Hall =

Historic building in Minneapolis, US

- U.S. National Register of Historic Places
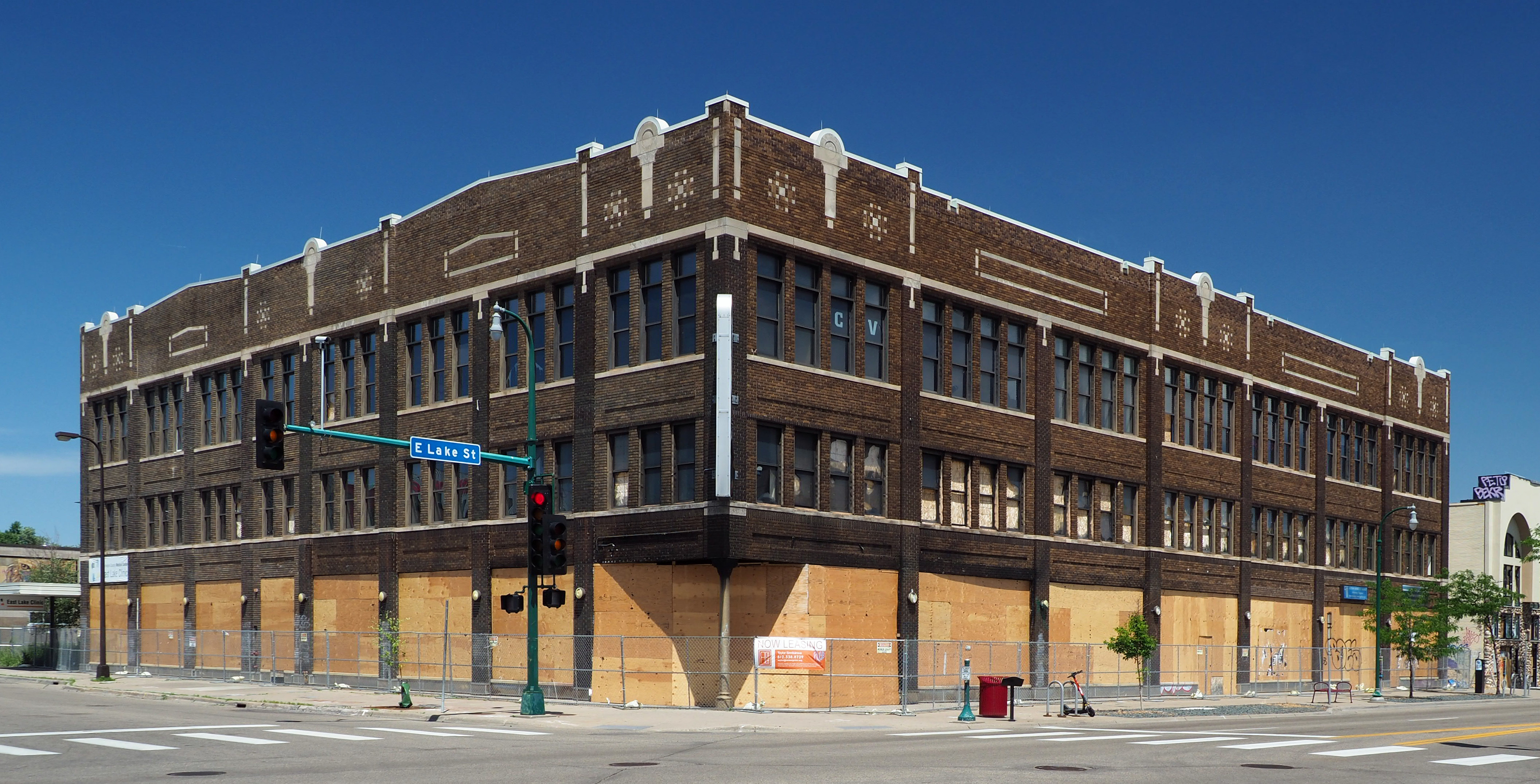
- The boarded up Coliseum Building in 2022 viewed from the southwest

- Location within Minnesota Location within the United States
- Location: Minneapolis, Minnesota
- Coordinates: 44°56′55.32″N 93°13′57.72″W
- Built: 1917
- Architect: L. J. Johnson (1917 building); H.E. Halden (1923 addition)
- Architectural style: Classical Revival
- NRHP reference No.: 100007557
- Added to NRHP: March 24, 2022

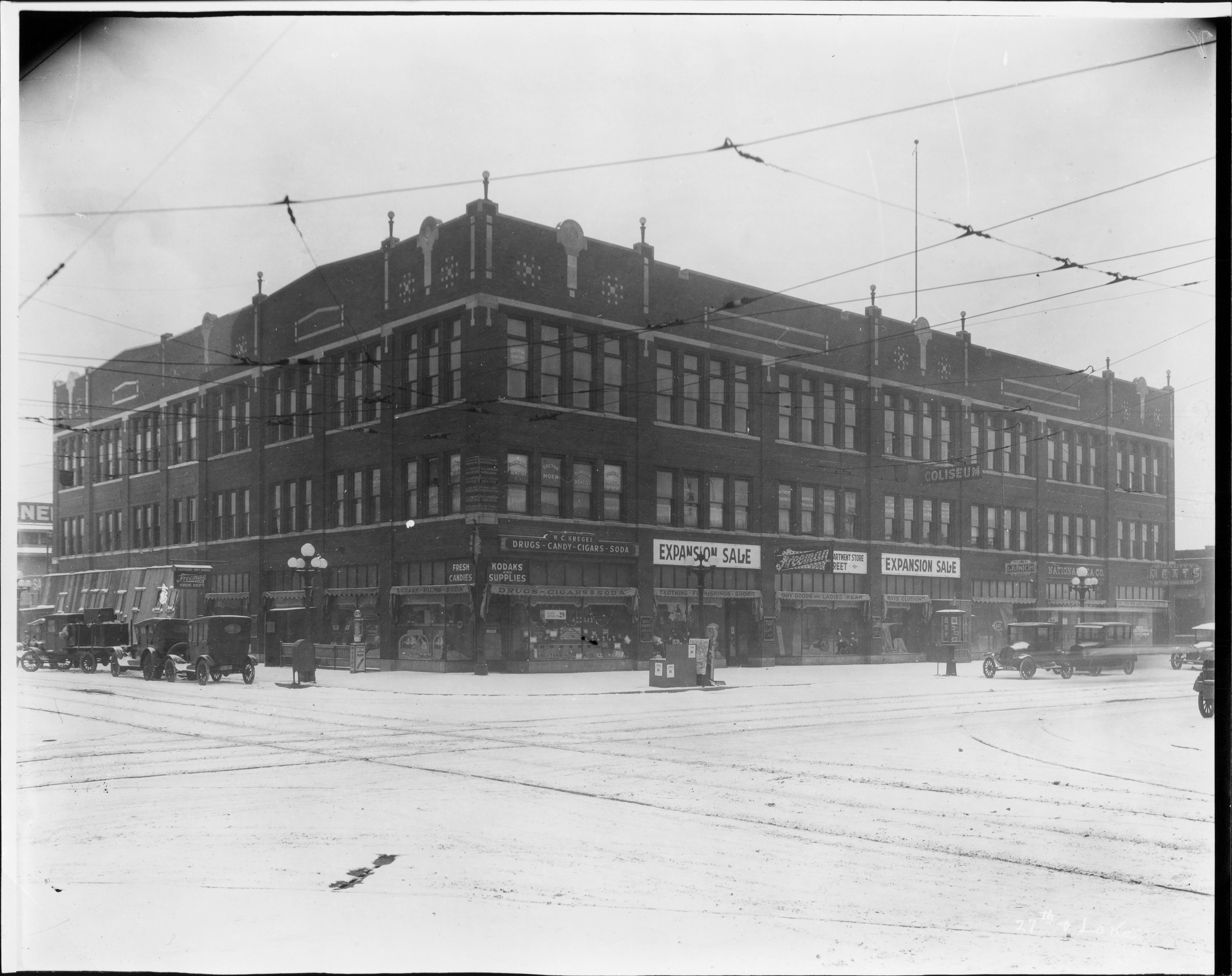
Coliseum Building

The Coliseum Building and Hall is a historic structure in Minneapolis, Minnesota, United States. It is located in the Longfellow community at the intersection of East Lake Street and 27th Avenue South. The building was constructed in 1917 and originally served as a department store and dance hall. In 2020, the building was damaged by arson during riots after the murder of George Floyd.

The Coliseum Building and Hall was listed on the National Register of Historic Places in 2022.

== Description ==
The Coliseum Building and Hall is located at 2708 East Lake Street in Minneapolis, and a center of the "downtown" Longfellow community. It was designed by architect L. J. Johnson in the late-19th-and-early-20th-century Classical Revival style. The building is rectangular in shape and features three stories, a brick façade, and a decorative parapet. The first level features store fronts. Over its history, the structure has had several additions, and has been referred to as the Coliseum Ballroom and as Podany’s Warehouse. Its architectural significance is for the period of 1917 – 1973.

== History ==
=== Department store and dance hall ===
In its early history, the building featured a Freeman's department store largely serving Scandinavian immigrants in the area. In the 1970s, the department store closed and after being sold it became the Podany Building and featured a dance hall. In the early 2000s, the building went through redevelopment when it reclaimed its original moniker.

=== George Floyd protests ===
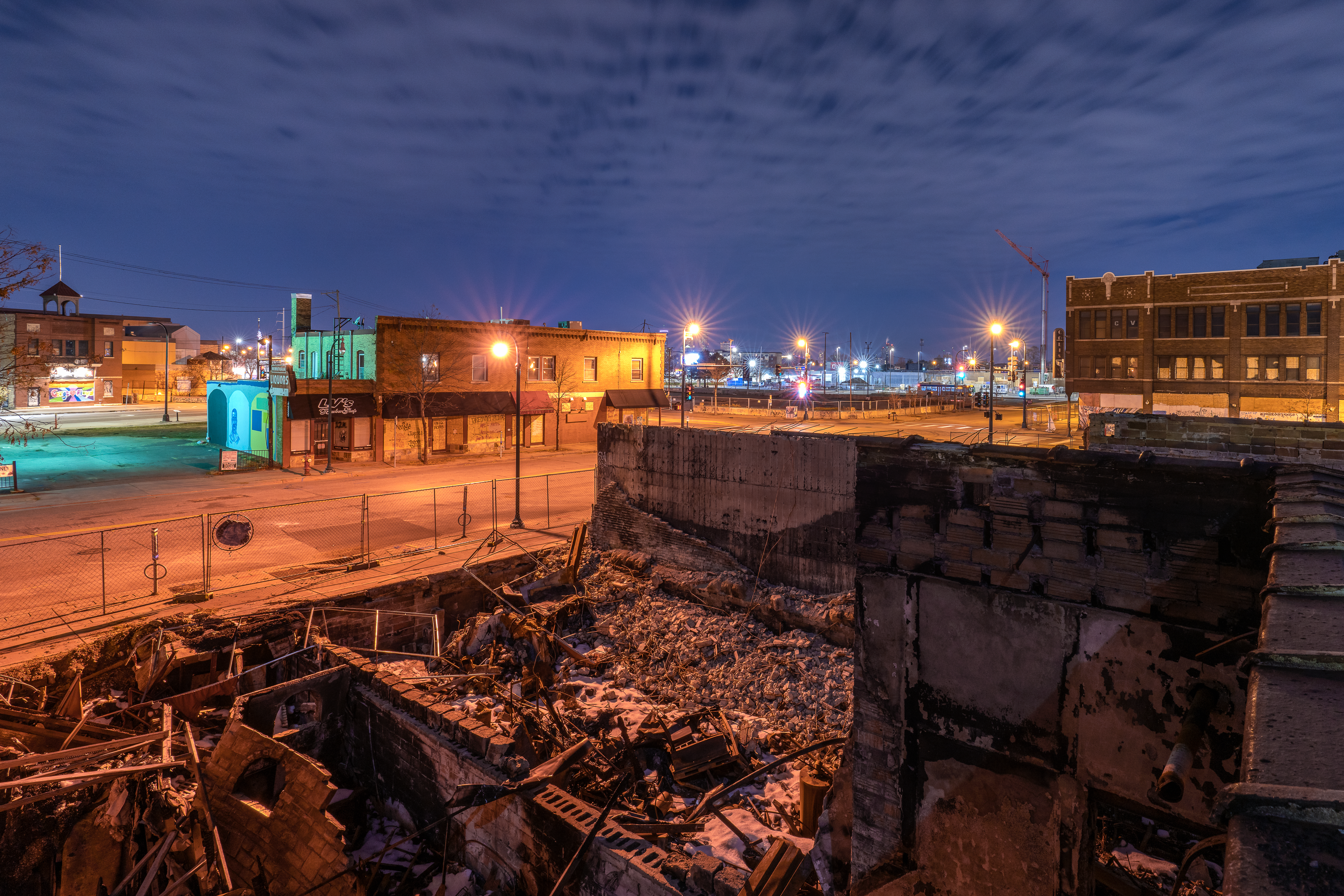
The Coliseum Building amongst ruins in the aftermath of rioting in 2020.

By the 2020s, the multi-use Coliseum Building featured a health clinic, restaurants, and other businesses. Over several days between May 27 to 29, 2020, the building was vandalized and severely damaged by arson during the George Floyd protests in Minneapolis–Saint Paul, and all of the tenants vacated the structure. The scorched brick façade, however, remained standing.

=== Redevelopment and preservation ===
A $26 million redevelopment project was announced in late 2021 for the property, which was purchased by Seward Redesign, a non-profit development firm.

The building was listed on the National Register of Historic Places on March 24, 2022.

== See also ==
- National Register of Historic Places listings in Hennepin County, Minnesota
