= Citi Trends =

American retail clothing chain

Citi Trends, Inc.

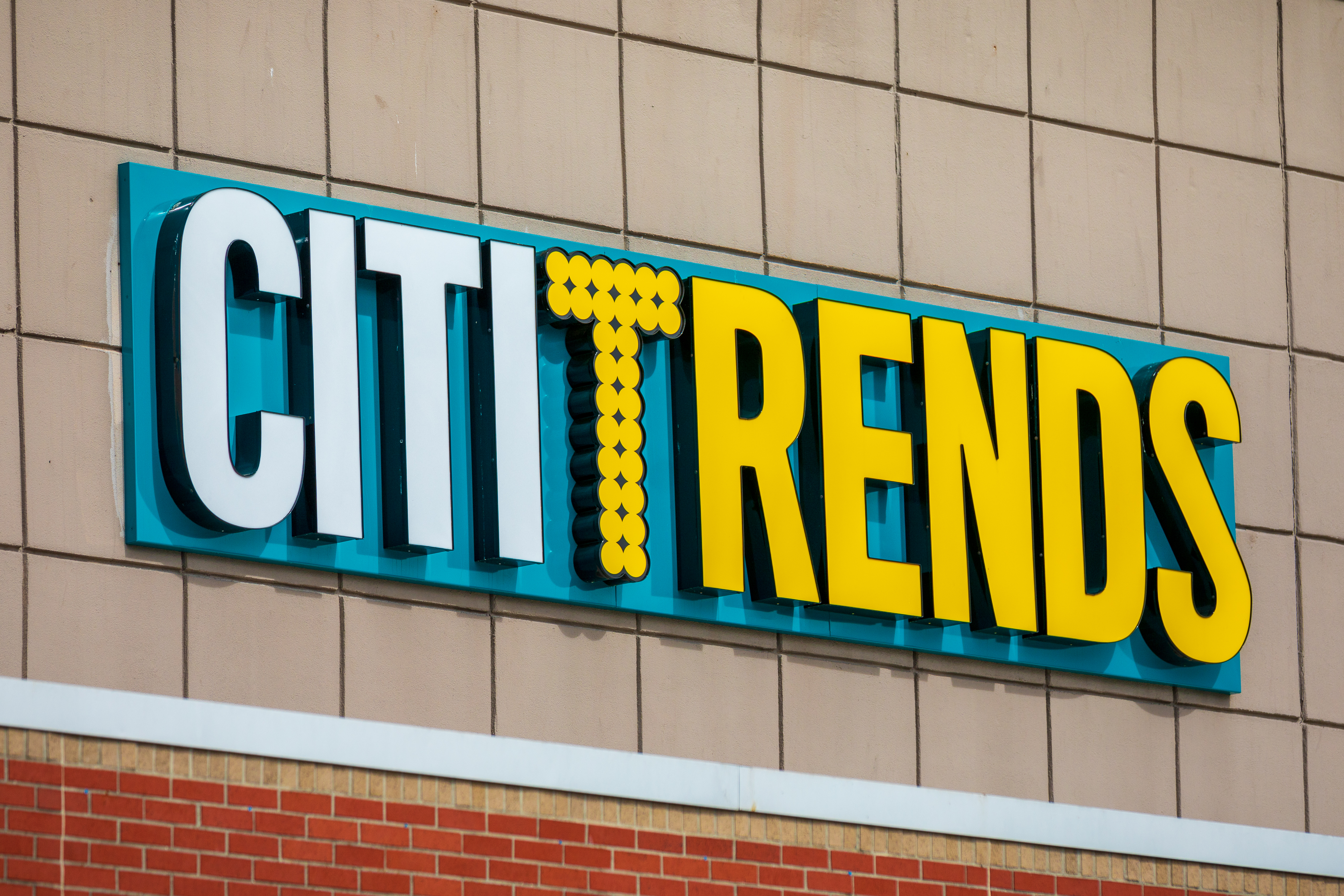
- Citi Trends corporate logo
- Type: Public
- Traded as: Nasdaq: CTRN; Russell 2000 Component
- Industry: Retail
- Founded: 1958; 68 years ago
- Headquarters: Savannah, Georgia, United States
- Number of locations: 616 (June, 2022)
- Area served: U.S.
- Products: Clothing
- Revenue: ▲US$820 million (2025)
- Net income: ▲US$5.21 million (2025)
- Website: cititrends.com

Citi Trends, Inc. is an American retail clothing chain selling discounted products targeted primarily at African-American customers.

The company opened its first store in Savannah, Georgia in 1958 under the name Allied Department Stores. The company began renaming its stores Citi Trends in 2000, and officially became Citi Trends a year later.

Citi Trends comprises more than 600+ stores in 33 states. The chain is known for targeting urban, lower-income customers. In May, 2005, Citi Trends became a publicly traded company on the Nasdaq exchange with the symbol CTRN. The headquarters of Citi Trends is located in Savannah, Georgia. There is also a distribution center in Darlington, South Carolina along with one in Roland, Oklahoma. On February 28, 2005, Citi Trends Inc. went public in an initial public offering of stock worth up to $57.5 million.

In March 2017, Chief Executive Jason Mazzola resigned after two years in the position and five years at the company. Chief Financial Officer and Chief Operating Officer Bruce Smith stepped in as acting CEO until a permanent replacement was found.

A Citi Trends store was among the property locations destroyed by arson during the George Floyd protests in Minneapolis–Saint Paul in May 2020.

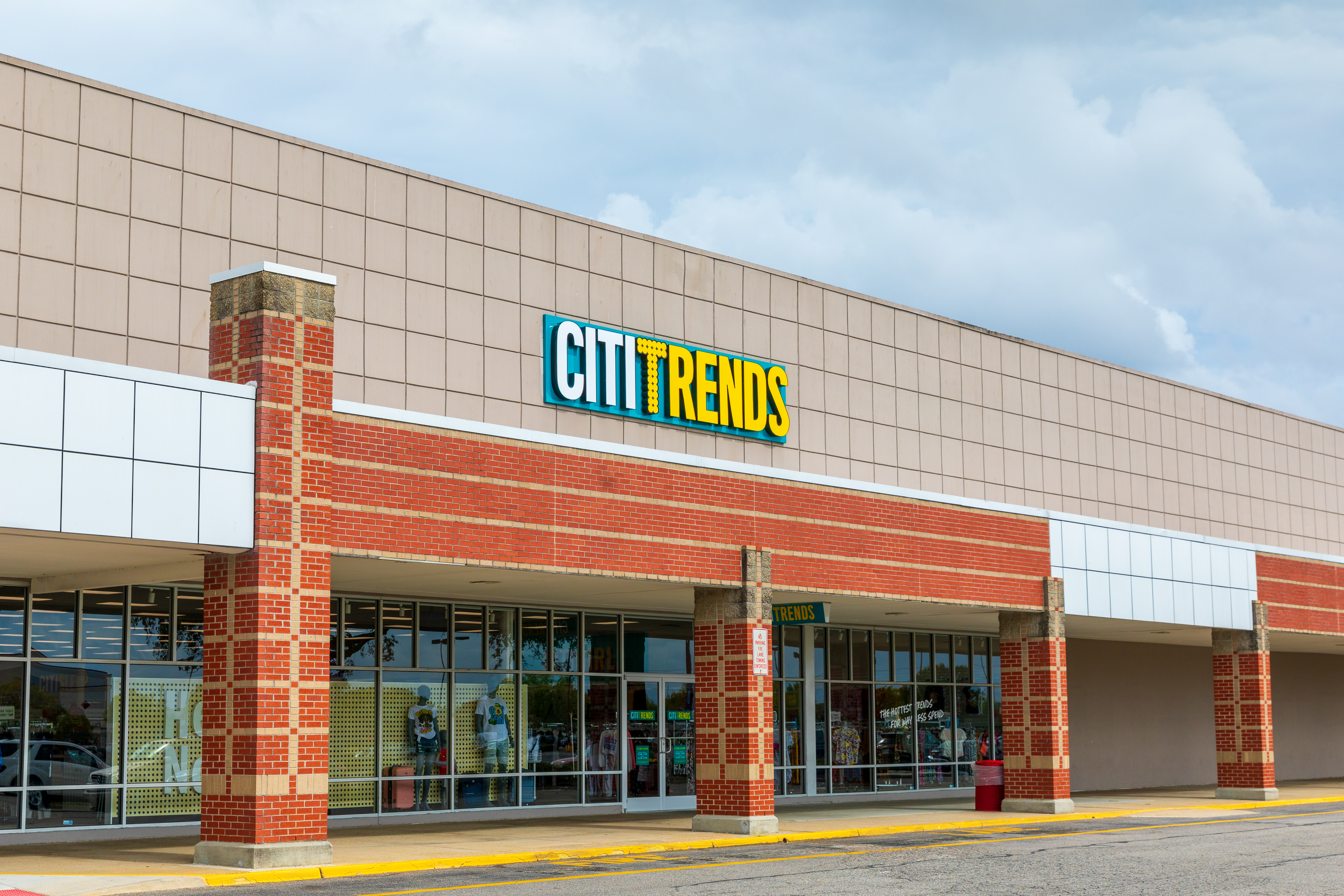
Citi Trends storefront

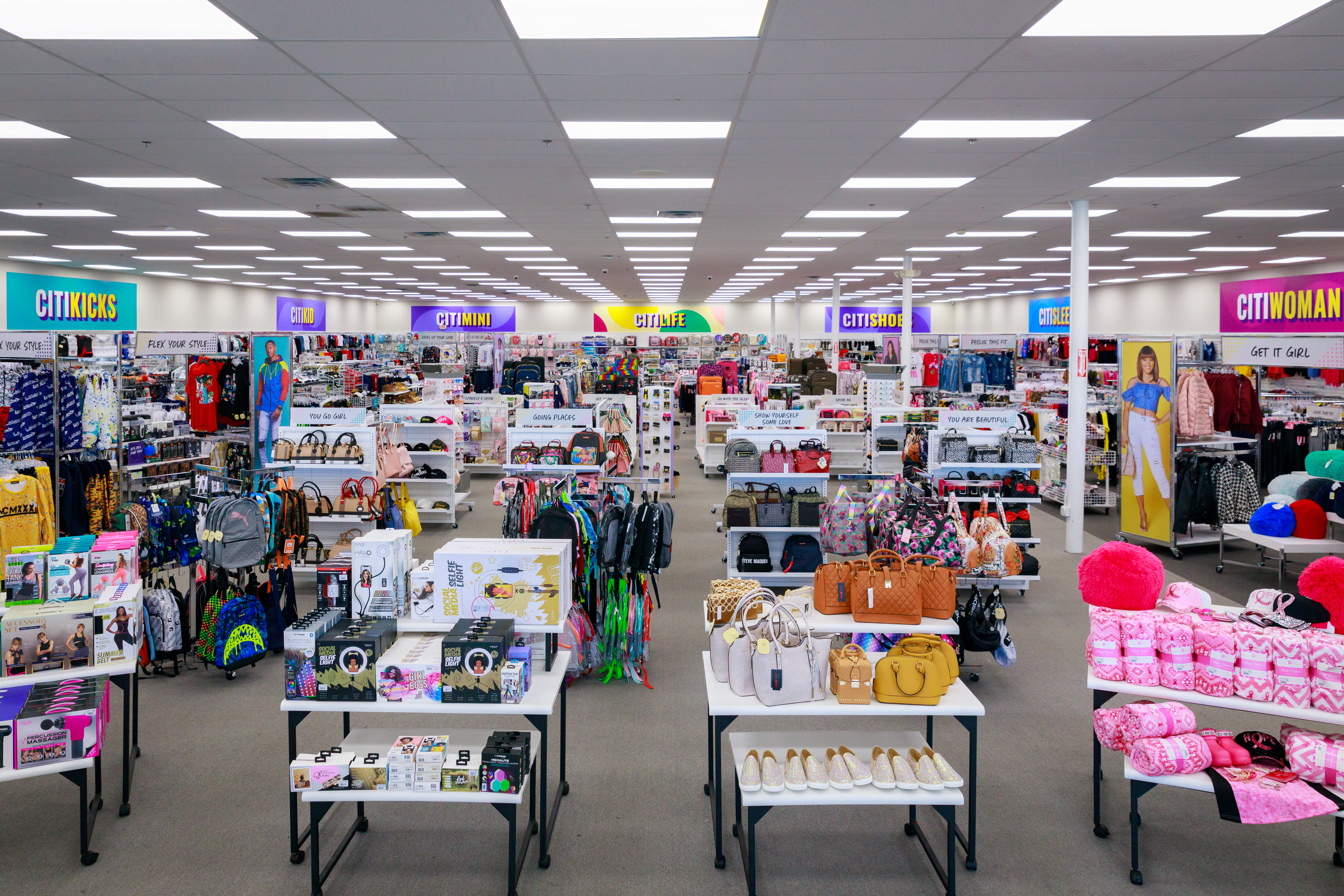
Citi Trends store interior layout
