= Paris Adkins-Jackson =

American researcher

- Born: Los Angeles
- Education: Humboldt State University; California Institute of Integral Studies; Claremont Graduate University; Morgan State University
- Known for: Studying role of structural racism on healthy aging
- Scientific career
- Fields: Epidemiology
- Institutions: Columbia University
- Thesis: Examining the Validity of Self-care for Black Women: a Mixed Method Analysis (2018)

Paris ("AJ") Adkins-Jackson is an epidemiologist, health equity researcher, and Assistant Professor of Epidemiology and Sociomedical Sciences in the Mailman School of Public Health at Columbia University in New York. She uses mixed methods combining qualitative and quantitative data to study community health and the role of structural racism on healthy aging.

Adkins-Jackson grew up in south central Los Angeles, the daughter of a musician. She attended Hamilton High School. She gained a Bachelor of Arts in journalism from Humboldt State University in 2005, a Masters of Arts from California Institute of Integral Studies in cultural anthropology 2007, and a Masters of Public Health from Claremont Graduate University in 2012.

While she was a doctoral student in psychometrics at Morgan State University, she was named 2016 HBCU All-Star student by the White House Initiative on Historically Black Colleges and Universities.

She gained her PhD in 2018 with a dissertation entitled, Examining the Validity of Self-care for Black Women: a Mixed Method Analysis. In 2021, she and her colleagues published a guide for epidemiologists and other researchers on measuring structural racism.

Adkins-Jackson has studied mistrust in clinical trial participation, and is studying how police violence and incarceration of incarcerations of Black and Latinx/a/o in mid-life may contribute to memory diseases in later life. She is also testing the effectiveness of an anti-racism intervention.

Adkins-Jackson is a board member of the Society for the Analysis African American Public Health Issues, and senior research fellow at the Center for Antiracism Research for Health Equity.
