= Societal racism =

Sociocultural phenomenon

Societal racism is a type of racism based on a set of institutional, historical, cultural and interpersonal practices within a society that places one or more social or ethnic groups in a better position to succeed and disadvantages other groups so that disparities develop between the groups. Societal racism has also been called structural racism, because, according to Carl E. James, society is structured in a way that excludes substantial numbers of people of minority backgrounds from taking part in social institutions. Societal racism is sometimes referred to as systemic racism as well. Societal racism is a form of societal discrimination.

== Background and importance ==
According to James Joseph Scheurich and Michelle D. Young, racism can be categorized into five types:

- Overt racism, for example, when an individual says something racist
- Covert racism, which is also an individual phenomenon
- Institutional racism, which is when institutions treat people of different races differently
- Societal racism
- Civilizational racism

Structural racism is harder to detect because it requires data to be examined over time to determine how the set of institutional, historical, cultural, and interpersonal practices maintain racial inequalities over a period of time. However, structural racism is the most prevalent form of racism because of how it pervades every level of society by incorporating the institutional, historical, cultural, and interpersonal practices within a society that perpetuates racial inequalities, therefore evaluating society as a whole.

White supremacy can refer to societal racism or individual, formal racism related to the identity of white people. The use of the British word “chav” has been described as a form of "social racism".

== In the United States ==
California Governor Gavin Newsom speaks in May 2020 about societal racism in the wake of the murder of George Floyd.

George M. Fredrickson has written that societal racism is deeply embedded in American culture, that in the 18th century it had already emerged with the purpose of maintaining a white-dominated society, and that "[it] did not require an ideology to sustain it so long as it was taken for granted." When looking specifically at structural racism within the United States of America it is the formalization of practices that frequently put whites, or Caucasians, in a position of advantage while at the same time being consistently detrimental to people of color, such as African Americans, Hispanics, Native Americans, Pacific Islanders, Asians, and Middle Easterners. This position of advantage often entails: more opportunities to hold positions of power; privilege, white privilege; and superior treatment by institutions. This results in racial inequalities between whites and other ethnic groups which often manifest as issues of poverty or health disparities between the groups.

=== Poverty ===
The analysis of poverty levels, currently or over a period of time, across different ethnic groups can give an indication of, but do not imply, structural racism. The 2017 poverty guideline for the contiguous United States for a household of 3 is $20,460.00 according to the U.S. Department of Health and Human Services. A household size of three was chosen since the average size in the United States is about three. Using the poverty guideline for a household size of three from the U.S. Department of Health and Human Services as a baseline to compare incomes by household in each ethnic group, one can see the trends and compare the groups. The table below is based on the 2017 U.S. census data and shows the poverty levels of the primary racial groups in the U.S.:

	At or below the poverty limit	Between twice the poverty limit to the poverty limit	Households with income over $100,000/year
Asian	12.6%	15.1%	41.7%
White	13.4%	20.3%	32.9%
Hispanic	18.1%	26.2%	19.8%
Black	26.8%	26.9%	16.1%

Compared to households who identify as white those who identify as Black or Hispanic have higher rates of poverty. Households who identify as Asian have lower rates of poverty as many immigrated after receiving job offers earned through their work and education background and Asians born in the United States have a high rate of post-secondary education, contributing to the model minority stereotype that causes distance between Asians and poorer ethnic groups. On the other hand, a significant number of Hispanics in the United States are or are descendent of recent immigrants that sought menial work in the United States and brought little or no wealth with them which would contribute to the income difference seen between Hispanics and others. Black households are twice as likely to be impoverished compared to white households. Hispanic households are about 35% more likely than white households to be at or below the poverty line. Both Hispanic and Black households are 35% more likely than white households to have an income between twice the poverty line and the poverty line. Asian households are 27%, 159%, and 110% more likely than White, Black, or Hispanic households, respectively, to have six figure incomes.

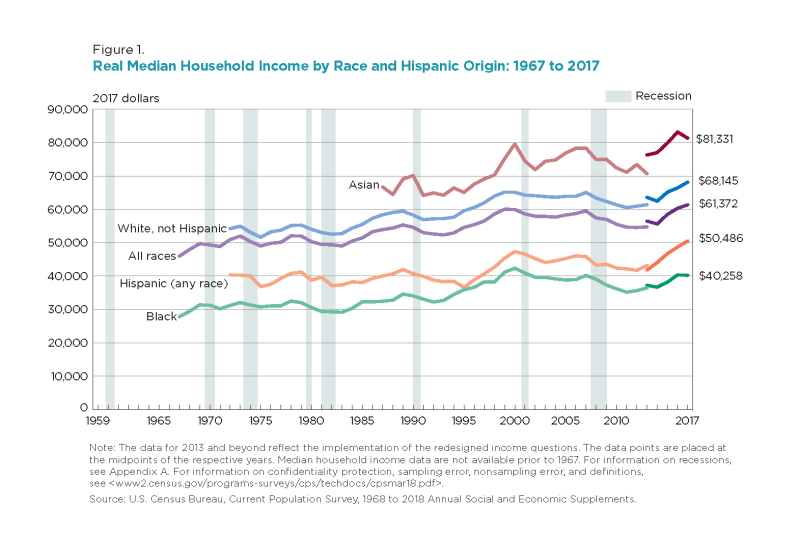
2017 median income graph by ethnicity from the U.S. Census Bureau website

The wealth gap between ethnic groups has existed throughout history. White households hold much greater levels of housing equity, business equity, and financial assets than Black and Hispanic households. Married couples can accumulate wealth quickly through sharing resources. Black households are twice as often single adults compared to white households. Poverty leads to health issues, less higher education, more high school dropouts, more teenage pregnancy, and less opportunities.

=== Health inequities ===
The cycle of poverty that structural racism could impose on minorities has adverse effects on their overall health, among other things. Health inequities can manifest as disparities in several aspects of health such as quality of healthcare, incidence and outcome of disease or disorders, life span, infant mortality, health and sexual education, exercise, and drug use. Furthermore, racism itself is thought to have a negative impact on both mental and physical health.

According to a paper that analyzed published research on PubMed from the years 2005–2007 on the connection between discrimination and health, there is an inverse relationship between the two; furthermore, the pattern is becoming more apparent across a greater variety of issues and data. This study shows that this long known pattern has not disappeared. According to the 1985 Report of the Secretary's Task Force on Black and Minority Health by the U.S. Department of Health and Human Services in general Americans were getting healthier and had increased longevity but there is a persisting inequality between Blacks and other minority groups in the rate of death and illness contrasting to the overall population; furthermore, the report notes that this inequality has been around for more than a generation at this point or since better, more factual federal records have been kept.

This is definitive proof that the federal government noticed these racial inequalities in health long before the 2005-2007 study of research data that revealed a pattern. Based on the studies they reviewed it became apparent that regardless of socioeconomic status, racial inequalities in health were present between minority groups for several health issues such as diabetes, hypertension, heart disease, and obesity. This shows that health inequities can be alleviated by increasing socioeconomic status but they still persist at all levels. Research findings often lack racial or ethnic variables. A 2023 scoping review of the literature found that in studies involving multiracial or multiethnic populations, race or ethnicity variables lacked thoughtful conceptualization and informative analysis concerning their role as indicators of exposure to racialized social disadvantage. Racialized social disadvantage encompasses systemic and structural barriers, discrimination, and social exclusion experienced by individuals and communities based on their race or ethnicity, resulting in disparities in access to resources, opportunities, and health outcomes.

In addition, there is data that supports the fact that as health care has advanced worldwide overall there are more increases in health inequalities between races. One such study that supports this is "The Progress Toward the Healthy People 2010 Goals and Objectives" which is a review, done by members of the National Center for Health Statistics of the Centers for Disease Control and Prevention and the Center of Excellence on Health Disparities, Morehouse School of Medicine, that explores progress towards improving the overall health quality and longevity of Americans and the health disparities between ethnic groups. To accomplish this they used a system of 31 measures to analyze the progress and disparities; which consisted of 10 leading health indicators (LHI), created by the Department of Health and Human Services, with a few objectives each for twenty two total and the remaining measures were formulated by the group who did the review. The ten leading health indicators are: Physical activity, overweight and obesity, tobacco use, substance abuse, responsible sexual behavior, mental health, injury and violence, environmental quality, immunization, and access to healthcare; the group who did the review supplemented the leading health indicators with 7 more objectives and 2 more measures, infant mortality and life expectancy to give 31 in total. They used these measures to track the disparities between Asians, Hispanic or Latino, Black Non-Hispanics, white non-Hispanic, American Indian or Alaskan Natives, and Native Hawaiians or Pacific Islanders; Data is not available for every ethnic group for all 31 measures. Using the available data for the objectives they have more than one time period on they found 6 objectives showed a decrease in disparity between ethnic groups and the national average while they found 18 disparity increases across 11 objectives.

This confirms that even as healthcare is advancing and new scientific discoveries are being made overall the disparities between ethnic groups are increasing. This is a trend that was noticed in the 1985 report and has continued through the time worsening its effects and contributing to greater health inequalities. It is possible for structural racism to hinder the health and longevity of minorities.

In 2011, Gee and Ford reviewed ways of conceptualizing structural racism in research. Health researchers use a variety of approaches to measure the impact of structural racism. Adkins-Jackson and colleagues published a guide for measuring structural racism for health researchers, one of several approaches to measurement.

=== Relationship to agency ===
Agency is the idea that a person's life outcomes are significantly influenced by their own individual efforts. Social structure is the idea that life outcomes are significantly influenced by the individual's race, class, gender, social status, inherited wealth, legal situation, and many other factors that are outside the individual's control.

A society, even a "colorblind" society, can be structured in a way that perpetuates racism and racial inequality even if its individual members do not hold bigoted views about members of other racial groups. Society can still effectively exclude racially disadvantaged people from decision-making or make choices that have a disparate impact on them. For example, a policy to give more money to rural schools and less to urban schools is facially neutral: on the face of it, the policy says nothing about race. However, if the rural and urban populations have significantly different racial proportions, then this policy would have a society-wide racial effect.
