= H. Keith Moo-Young =

American academic

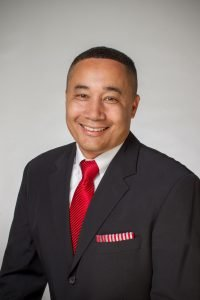
- Born: April 11, 1969 (age 57); Washington, D.C., U.S.
- Education: Morgan State University, Rensselaer Polytechnic Institute, University of Pennsylvania
- Awards: AAAS Fellow (2012); American Society of Civil Engineers Fellow (2011); National Academy of Inventors Fellow (2016)
- Scientific career
- Fields: Environmental Engineering and Sustainability
- Workplaces: Rensselaer Polytechnic Institute, Lehigh University, Villanova University; Cal State L.A.

H. Keith Moo-Young (born April 11, 1969), also known as Keith M. Young, is the Vice Provost and Dean of the undergraduate education of the Rensselaer Polytechnic Institute, one of America's preeminent engineering schools. From 2013 to 2018, he served as the Chancellor at Washington State University. From 2006-2013, he was the Dean of Engineering at California State University, Los Angeles. Dr. Moo-Young was the Associate Dean for Research and Graduate Studies at Villanova University, where he also served as Interim Dean from 2004 to 2006.

Under Moo-Young’s stewardship, enrollments at the campus in Richland grew steadily, totaling 1,825 students for the just-concluded spring semester—a 21 percent increase from the previous spring. The campus enrolls the most diverse student body in the WSU statewide system. For the spring semester, 35.8 percent of students identified as minorities, 57.4 percent female, and 36.6 percent first generation. WSU-Tri Cities recently qualified as a Department of Education Hispanic Serving Institution

== Biography ==
=== Early life ===
Moo-Young was born in Washington, D.C. Moo-Young graduated from Morgan State University in 1991 with a B.S. degree in civil engineering as valedictorian. He earned an M.S. and Ph.D. from Rensselaer Polytechnic Institute in both civil and environmental engineering. He received an Executive master's in technology management from the University of Pennsylvania, and a Management Develop Certificate from Harvard University.

=== Research career ===
Dr. Moo-Young has served on the faculty at Lehigh University, Villanova University, Cal State L.A., Washington State University, and RPI. His research interests include sustainability of solid and hazardous waste management systems, environmental containment, and remediation technologies. Dr. Moo-Young is a member of the National Academy of Inventors, a member of the American Association for the Advancement of Science (AAAS), American Society of Civil Engineers (ASCE), American Academy of Environmental Engineers, and he served as the chair of the Environmental Engineering Committee for the Science Advisory Board of the U.S. Environmental Protection Agency.

Moo-Young is a member of the National Advisory Board of the Great Minds in STEM.
