= Brandi Waters =

American educator

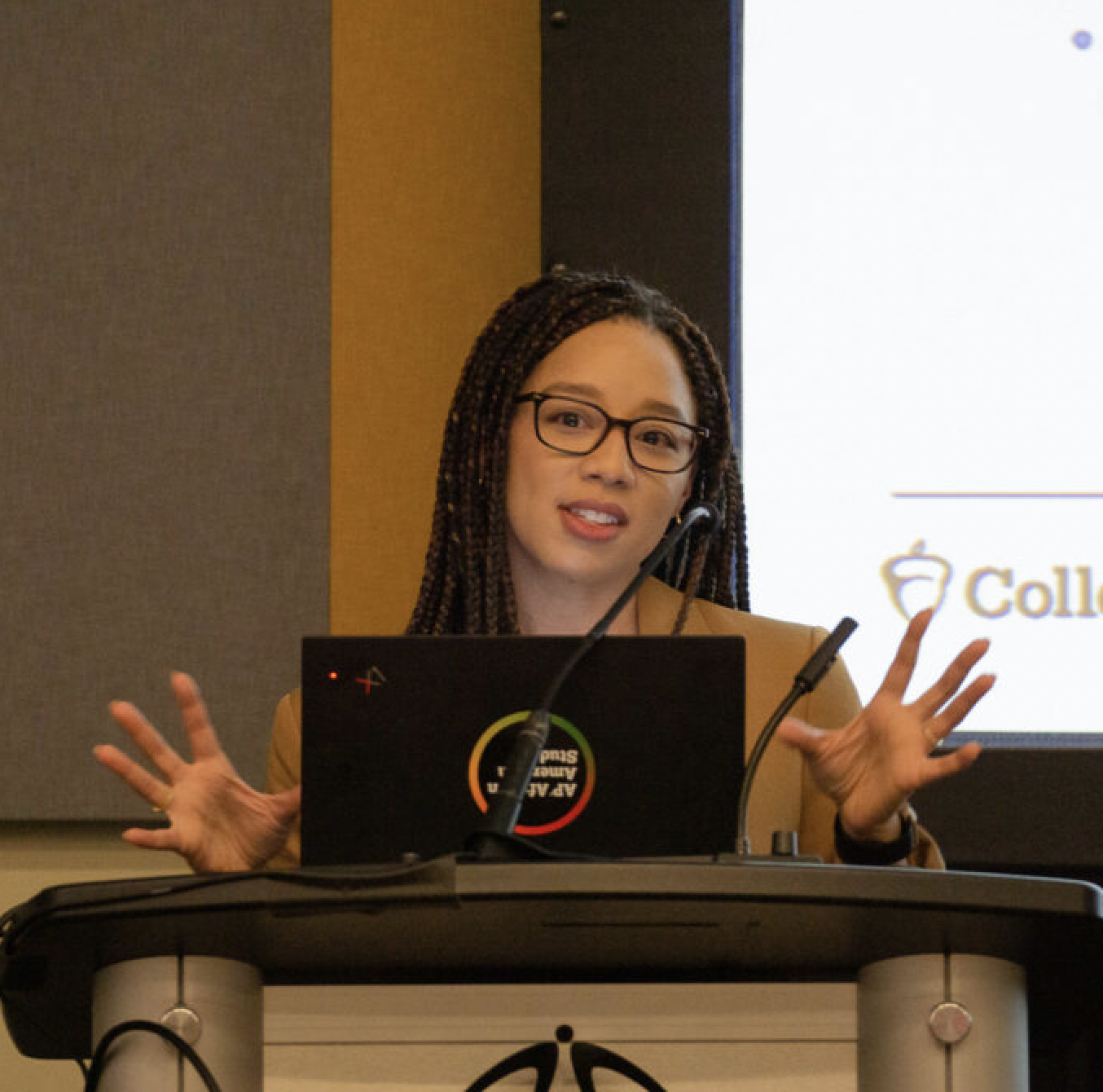
- Born: Philadelphia, PA
- Education: Yale University (Ph.D.); Johns Hopkins University (M.A.); Harvard University (M.A); University of Pennsylvania (B.A.)
- Occupation: Educator

Brandi Waters is an American educator who is best known for her role as the executive director of the AP African American Studies program created by College Board.

== Early life ==
Waters was born in Philadelphia, Pennsylvania. She earned her Bachelor of Arts in anthropology from the University of Pennsylvania, her Master of Arts in Latin American history from Johns Hopkins University, and her Master of liberal arts from Harvard University. Waters earned her PhD from Yale University in 2021 in a combined PhD program in Latin American history and African American studies. Her dissertation was titled, "Defects": Slavery, Disability, Doctors, and the Law in Late Colonial Cartagena and Philadelphia."

== Career ==
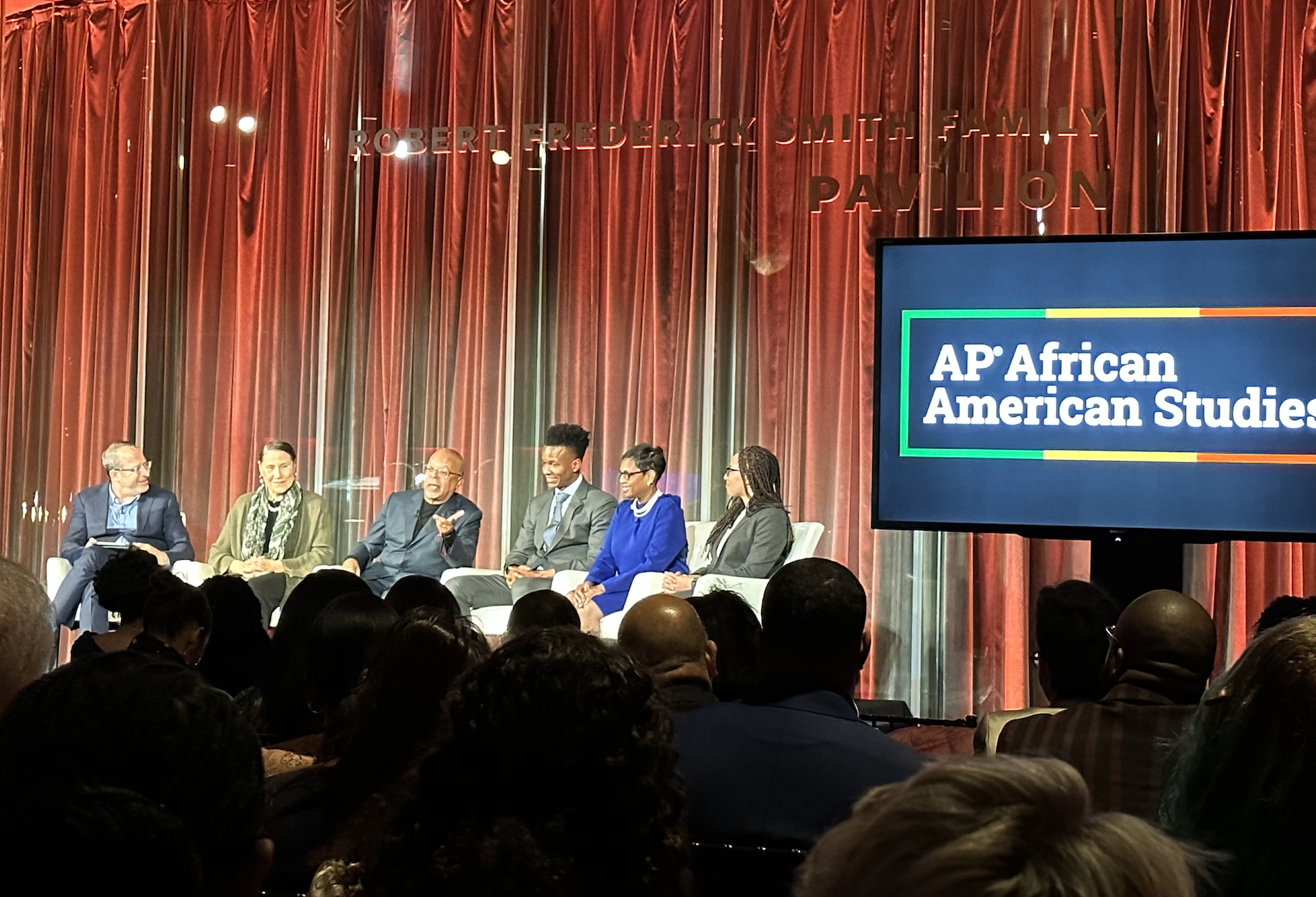
Waters (right) with David Coleman (left), Evelyn Brooks Higginbotham (second to left), Henry Louis Gates Jr., (third from left), and Robert J. Patterson (third from right).

In April 2021, Waters became the director of AP African American Studies, the new college-level course for advanced-placement students in high school. The course was created by College Board. In August 2022, she transitioned to the title of senior director and program manager of AP African American Studies. In various media interviews, Waters advocated for the course, citing the importance of American students learning about African culture, history, linguistics, art and economics, and enslavement, including the role of Black Africans in that tragedy. In an interview with PBS NewsHour, Waters explained that research among university professors and higher-ed groups showed that the field of Black studies has gained increased attention in the past decade, which she said justified the creation of a new source-analysis based AP course. Waters oversaw the development of the pilot course and the release of the official curriculum. In an interview on CBS Mornings with Tony Dokoupil and Gayle King, Waters explained that the official curriculum was created after talking with teachers, students, and professional academics. Waters defended the course's necessity in American academics, citing a greater need for the teaching of Black history in American schools. In February 2022, Florida governor Ron DeSantis blocked the course, citing a lack of educational value. After the College Board released the official course framework following DeSantis' announcement, the New York Times accused the organization of stripping down the course curriculum to appease conservatives. Waters responded by asserting that the "College Board does not bend to politics," that the curriculum was already decided prior to DeSantis' blocking of the course, and that the Times article was not factual.

== See also ==
- Henry Louis Gates Jr.
- Evelyn Brooks Higginbotham
- Robert J. Patterson (American educator)
