= Earl Graves =

Earl Graves may refer to:

- Earl G. Graves Sr. (1935–2020), American entrepreneur, publisher, businessman and philanthropist
- Earl G. Graves Jr. (born 1962), American businessman and basketball player
