= AP African American Studies =

U.S. advanced placement course

Logo of AP African American Studies as of 2026

Advanced Placement (AP) African American Studies (also known as AP AFAM, AP African, or AP Afro) is a college-level course and examination offered to high school students in the United States through the College Board's Advanced Placement program. The course is dedicated solely to learning about and researching the African diaspora and is designed to elevate African-American history and education.

Starting in the 2023–2024 school year, the pilot course expanded to approximately 800 schools. The course launched worldwide beginning in August 2024.

== History and development ==
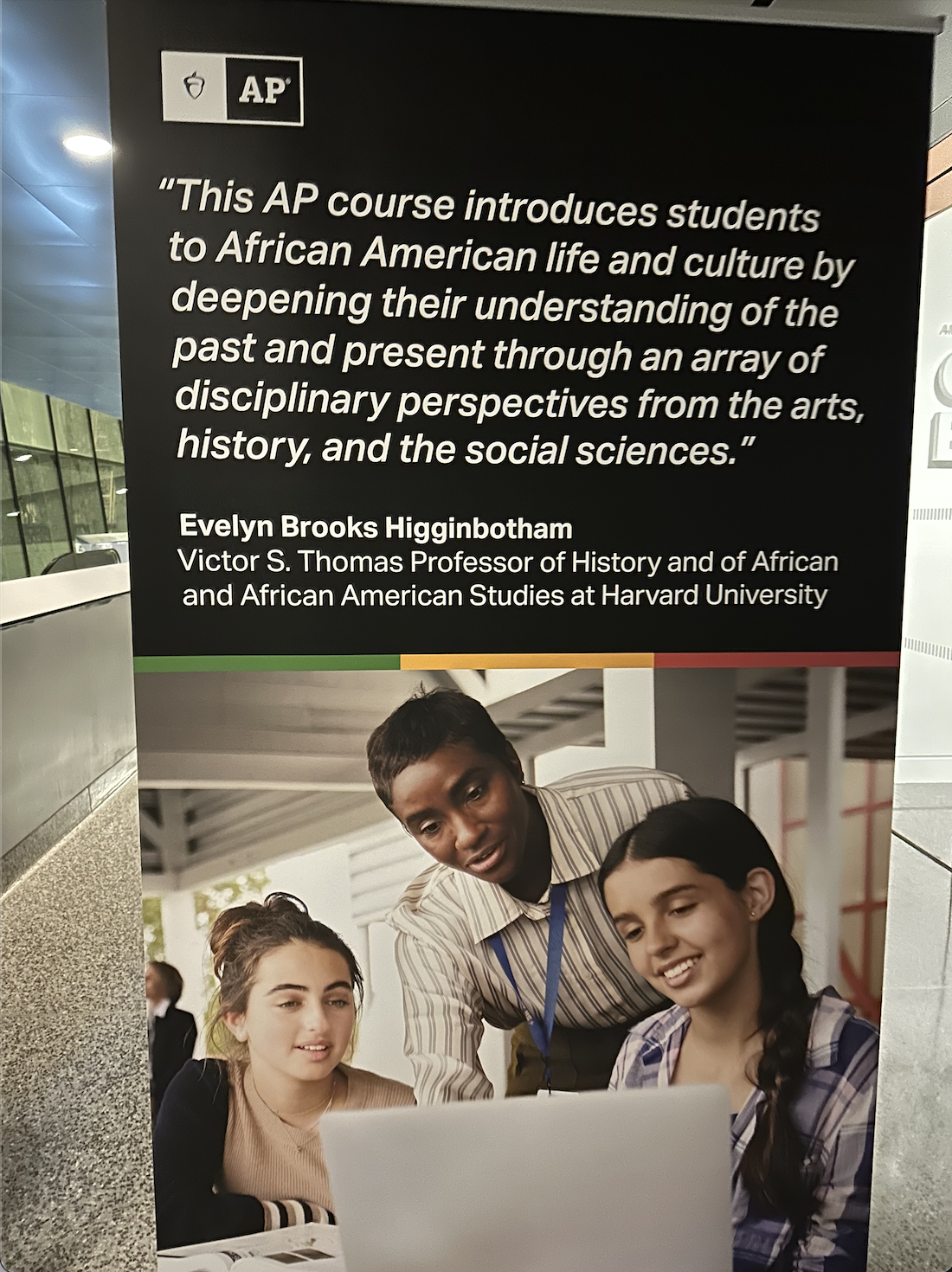
A banner for AP African American Studies at the National Museum of African American History and Culture in Washington, DC.

For decades, critics of the College Board and advanced placement programs have argued that curricula have focused too much on Euro-centric history. Between 2017 and 2020, the College Board partnered with the University of Notre Dame and Tuskegee University to pre-pilot AP African American Studies in 11 selected schools. In 2020, the College Board reshaped some curricula among history-based AP courses to further reflect the African diaspora.

In 2021, the College Board announced that it would be officially piloting AP African American Studies course to begin in the 2022–2023 academic year. The course was piloted in approximately 60 schools across the United States in its first year. AP African American Studies was the first ethnic studies course offered by College Board, and was the first pilot course since 1952.

Topics in the pilot course range from Queen Nzinga in northern Angola to the Harlem Renaissance and the Black Panthers. Topics include lesser-known activists like Valerie Thomas, the African American scientist who invented the illusion transmitter at NASA. Brandi Waters, the director of the AP African American Studies course development, stated, "this course will offer students across the country a rigorous and inspiring introduction to African American studies."

Advocates of the launch of AP African American Studies argue the course will help attract more African American students to AP programs and will bolster minority scores. According to 2019 data, 32% of Black students passed their AP exams compared to 44% of White and Asian students. Additionally, the College Board described that AP African American Studies would further "[attract] Black and [Latino] high school teachers".

=== Staff ===
Brandi Waters is the executive director of AP African American Studies for College Board. Leaders in the field of Black studies, such as Henry Louis Gates, Evelyn Brooks Higginbotham, and Robert Patterson assisted in the creation of the course.

=== Reaction ===
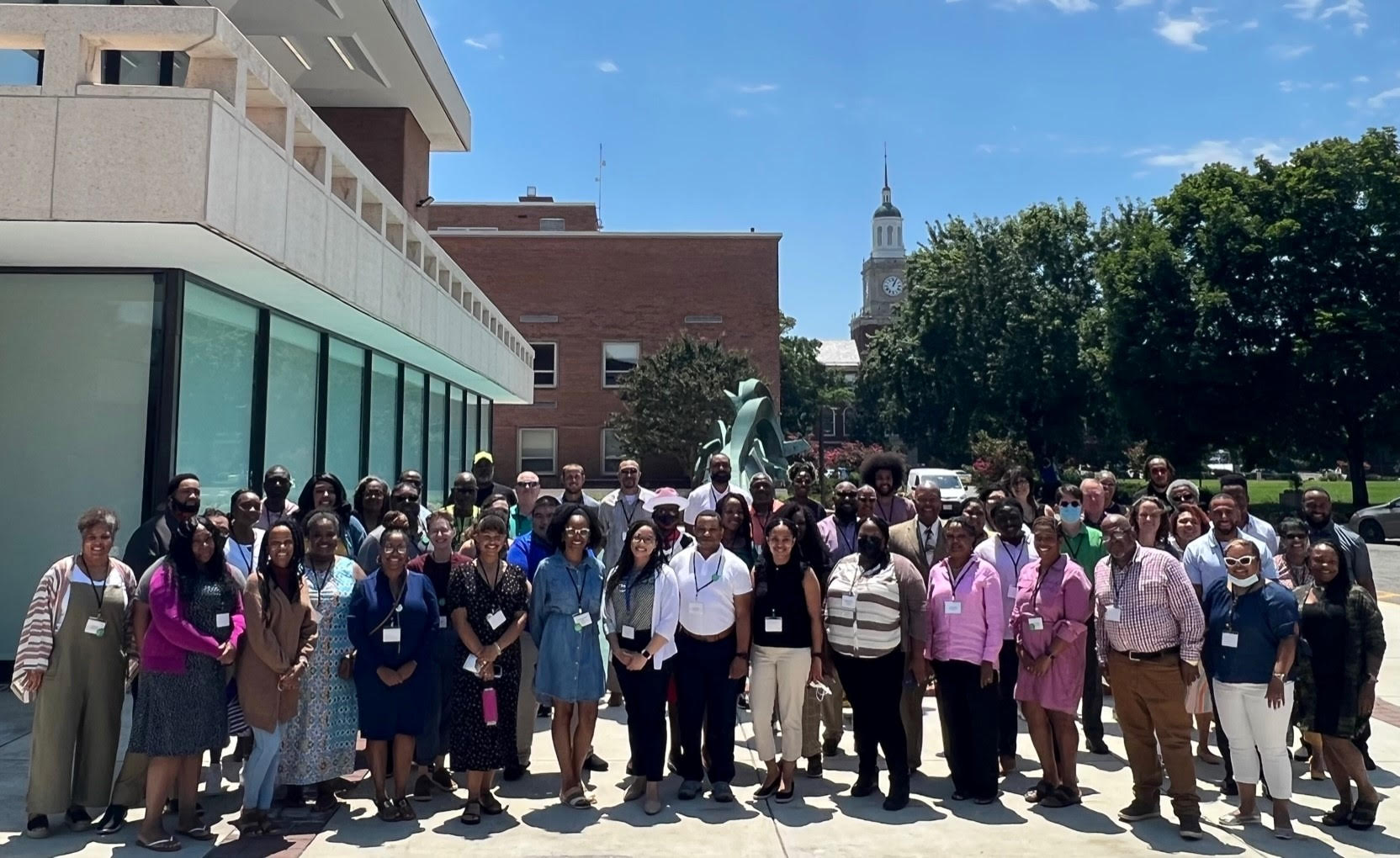
The AP African American Studies Founding Group at Howard University, in Washington, DC

Dawn Williams, dean of Howard University's School of Education, said that AP African American Studies consists of a "curriculum that's been vetted for years by experts in the field." In 2022, Gates stated, "Nothing is more dramatic than having the College Board launch an AP course in a field—that signifies ultimate acceptance and ultimate academic legitimacy... AP African American Studies is not CRT. It's not the 1619 Project. It is a mainstream, rigorously vetted, academic approach to a vibrant field of study, one half a century old in the American academy, and much older, of course, in historically Black colleges and universities." The ultimate goal of the course is to teach that Black history is not limited to slavery or the Civil Rights Movement.

In a September 2022 opinion column for The Wall Street Journal, Jason L. Riley claimed that the College Board would probably pander to Black students with political indoctrination. College Board CEO David Coleman responded by stating, "There are no points ever awarded on [any] AP exam for agreeing with a point of view. Rather, students encounter evidence and make up their own minds." Daniel Soderstrom, one of the teachers of the pilot course, stated in an interview with CNN, "we're teaching factual information, and everything is verifiable."

The course was featured on America in Black, a television show that first aired on BET, VH1, and CBS February 19, 2023, where Soderstrom's class at Ridge View High School was interviewed. The segment highlighted the push-back from conservatives like Ron DeSantis in the implementation of the course, as well as positive reactions from community members and students.

==== Course controversy ====
Throughout 2022, during the administration of Florida's Republican governor Ron DeSantis, Florida state officials had repeated contact with the College Board, often discussing parts of the course found "objectionable." On January 12, 2023, the Florida Department of Education's Office of Articulation sent a letter to College Board saying the course was "inexplicably contrary to Florida law and significantly lacks educational value." The letter reportedly did not specify what was objectionable to the department, but a spokesperson for DeSantis indicated that the course left "large, ambiguous gaps that can be filled with additional ideological material." According to The New York Times, the letter called the course "historically inaccurate" and a violation of Florida state law (likely referring to the Stop WOKE Act passed in Florida in 2022).

DeSantis later gave his reason for the ban as the inclusion of queer theory and intersectionality in the course, as well as content regarding the role prisons play in systemic oppression, and stated that these topics were on “the wrong side of the line for Florida standards”. Though College Board pushed back on these topics it had found to be central to college-level African American Studies, they were largely removed in its February update, with intersectionality becoming an optional focus for the course's final project. College Board later revealed that no such forced lessons existed and that students must use evidence from conflicting viewpoints.

The College Board, which finalized the official curriculum prior to the DeSantis announcement, released the current curriculum on February 1, 2023. The work of numerous writers associated with Black feminism and critical race theory continues to be optional, and Black conservatism continues as a suggested research topic. According to Evelyn Brooks Higginbotham, one of the architects of the course, Florida's Department of Education saw "buzzwords" and falsely assumed that the material was required. Rather, Higginbotham maintained, students are expected to use sources from all sides of the political spectrum.

In February 2023, in interviews with both CBS and NPR, the president of the College Board, David Coleman, and the senior director of the program, Brandi Waters, stated that students will still have access to materials of all political backgrounds and that College Board has not backed down or "watered down its curriculum" because of media attention. Coleman also said that the curriculum was changed well before DeSantis announced the state's intent to ban the course in Florida and that College Board does not "bend to politics."

The South Carolina Department of Education eliminated funding of AP African American Studies in public schools, sparking criticism from civil rights leaders and accusations of "whitewashing" history. It is the third state to ban or restrict the course, following Florida and Arkansas. The decision, announced in a June 4, 2024 memo, allows the course only as an elective but not as an AP class. The department cited upcoming social studies standards review and legislative controversies as reasons for the decision. Despite assurance of continued African American history, organizations like the American Civil Liberties Union and NAACP criticized the move, arguing it deprives students of comprehensive education.

=== Course development timeline ===
- 2017–2020
  - Pre-pilot in 11 schools
- February 2022:
  - Pilot schools and educators identified and briefed
- July 2022:
  - Pilot educators trained at Howard University
- August/September 2022:
  - Pilot course launched
- May 2023:
  - Pilot course exam
- August/September 2023:
  - Additional schools (approximately 200) and educators added to pilot program
- May 2024:
  - Pilot course exam II
- August/September 2024:
  - Official Course Launch
- May 2025:
  - AP African American Studies Course Exam Administration, Available to All US Schools

== Course overview ==
Course overview
Unit	Topics	Time period
Unit 1	Origins of the African Diaspora	~9th century – 16th century
Unit 2	Freedom, Enslavement, and Resistance	~16th century to 1865
Unit 3	The Practice of Freedom	1865 – 1940s
Unit 4	Movements and Debates	1940s – present

== Exam ==
The end of course exam lasts 2 hours and 30 minutes, split into a 60 multiple-choice-question section lasting 70 minutes and a 4 free-response-question section lasting 80 minutes. The first two free-response questions each present students with one source (text-based for question 1 and non-text-based for question 2), while the last two each present students with a broad thematic concept that recurs throughout multiple course units.

In addition to the end-of-course exam, students will complete an Individual Student Project by May 31. Students will present their project in class and will then respond to questions about their findings as they engage in an oral defense of their project. To contribute to the AP Exam score, teachers will score their students’ project presentation and oral defense using a rubric provided by AP. The project is designed to take 15 hours to complete during which they will define a research topic and line of inquiry, conduct independent research to analyze authentic sources from multiple disciplines, and develop and deliver a presentation about their selected topic.

A pilot exam was administered in May 2023 and 2024 to prepare for the launching of the course in August 2024. These pilot exams were not scored like traditional AP exams and their data was not sent to students, teachers, or colleges and universities.

=== Score distribution ===
Year	1	2	3	4	5	% of scores 3 or higher	Mean score	Standard deviation	Number of students
2024	8.80%	18.60%	28.20%	30.20%	14.20%	72.60%	3.22	1.17	10,741
2025	4.90%	15.90%	29.30%	32.50%	17.30%	79.20%	3.41	1.10	21,435
2026	6.0%	17.0%	27.0%	30.0%	20.0%	77%			30000
