= America in Black =

- Presented by: Gayle King; Jericka Duncan; Michelle Miller; James Brown (sportscaster); Marc Lamont Hill; Ed Gordon
- Country of origin: United States
- Original language: English
- No. of series: 2
- No. of episodes: 13

Production
- Executive producers: Alvin Patrick; Jason Samuels; Deanna Fry
- Producer: Bonita Sostre
- Running time: 60 minutes
- Production companies: CBS News Race and Culture Unit

Original release
- Network: BET
- Release: February 19, 2023 – June 18, 2024

America in Black is a television program in the form of a news magazine that first premiered on February 19, 2023, on BET.

On January 29, 2024, the series was renewed for a second season which premiered on February 6, 2024.

== Overview ==
America in Black was created by CBS News and BET (both part of Paramount Global) to bring awareness to issues regarding American-Americans. Showrunner Deanna Fry has described it as an [African-American] "group chat come to life."

A typical episode highlights news stories within the Black communities of the United States, relying primarily on CBS News correspondents.

At the end of most episodes, Roy Wood Jr. has a segment titled the "mic drop" styled after Andy Rooney's long-running commentary segment on the original CBS News magazine, 60 Minutes.

== Episodes ==
Season	Episodes	Originally released	
Season	Episodes	First released	Last released
1	7	February 19, 2023	August 28, 2023
2	6	February 6, 2024	June 18, 2024

=== Season 1 (2023) ===
No. overall	No. in season	Title	Original release date	U.S. viewers (millions)
1	1	"War on Black History, Sheryl Lee Ralph and Rap Lyrics on Trial"	February 19, 2023	0.15
Marc Lamont Hill reports on the increasing number of school boards and legislators moving to limit the teaching of Critical Race Theory in public schools. Hill beings the episode by discussing the AP African American Studies course first launched by College Board in 2022. The course is designed to explore the African Diaspora in-depth. Hill analyzes the new AP course at Ridge View High School in Columbia, South Carolina, led by Daniel Soderstrom, who stated that the AP class is not a history class, but is instead interdisciplinary as "examples of Black excellence are found in everywhere in our society." Hill focuses on Soderstrom's class as they learn of the Harlem Renaissance, where one student explains the importance of the class to her. Hill expands on the public debates surrounding the teaching of Critical Race Theory. Hill interviews Nikole Hannah-Jones, founder of the 1619 Project, and Krystle Matthews, the Democratic nominee for United States Senate from South Carolina who was defeated by Republican Tim Scott, who stated that parent involvement in local school boards is necessary to a functioning education system. Hill meets Ibram X. Kendi, who argues in favor or the teaching of systemic racism and critical race theory in schools, and The Heritage Foundation's Mike Gonzalez, a conservative, argues against. Nischelle Turner continues the episode as the narrator by exploring singer and actor Sheryl Lee Ralph's Emmy win and Hollywood success. Turner interviews Ralph and they take up her accomplishments and her rise to fame and struggle with anorexia. Skyler Henry investigates the controversial use of rap lyrics to prosecute suspected gang members, including Young Thug, who is accused of inciting gang violence and racketeering charges in Georgia. Henry travels to the San Francisco Bay Area to speak with local rappers whose lyrics had been used in trials against them there, and also interviews E-40. Roy Wood Jr., in his "mic drop," explores police reform and ticket quotas.
2	2	"Michael B. Jordan, Tangled Beauty and Living Single"	March 5, 2023	0.15
Gayle King interviews Michael B. Jordan about his youth as a basketball player, his advocacy for HBCUs, and his creation of the new film Creed. Danya Bacchus analyzes African-American hair as she interviews clients in a California hair salon. Ayana Byrd, author of Hair Story: Untangling the Roots of Black Hair in America, cites American society's historic acceptance of black hair texture and styles. Bacchus discusses the CROWN Act, a law in several US states prohibiting employment and educational discrimination based on hair texture or styles, also citing a study that says black women's hair is 2.5 times more likely to be perceived as unprofessional. Bacchus interviews Cory Booker and Tabitha Brown about the passage of the CROWN act at the federal level. Jericka Duncan evaluates the decline in marriage rates in the United States in recent decades, with the single-rate of black Americans almost double than that of white Americans. Duncan interviews groups of single Black Americans to discuss the challenges they face when finding a partner. Roy Wood Jr., in his "mic drop," discusses the "OscarsSoWhite" complaint, asserting the Oscar's fails to recognize content made for and by black Americans. Wood argued that the 2022 film The Woman King should have been nominated.
3	3	"LL Cool J, Black Land Reparations and The Shade Room"	April 2, 2023	0.14
Jericka Duncan profiles the creator of the controversial social media site the Shade Room; Nischelle Turner talks to LL Cool J about his work; Ed Gordon analyses the Black Land Reparations Movement.
4	4	"Taraji P. Henson, Chlöe Bailey and Will Packer"	May 14, 2023	0.15
5	5	"Life and Limb, Gabrielle Union and Henry Louis Gates Jr."	June 4, 2023	N/A
6	6	"Maternal Mortality, T.D. Jakes, Kehinde Wiley and Afrobeats"	July 2, 2023	N/A
7	7	"March on Washington 60 Years Later"	August 28, 2023	N/A

=== Season 2 ===
No. overall	No. in season	Title	Original release date	U.S. viewers (millions)
8	1	"Ava DuVernay, Las Vegas Raiders President and Black Love"	February 6, 2024	N/A
9	2	"Victoria Monét, Keith Lee, Wes Moore"	February 20, 2024	0.15
10	3	"Kemba's Story, Sistas Cast, Black Voters"	March 5, 2024	N/A
11	4	"Missing Black Women & Girls; Regina King; Investment Legends; Hip Hop Entrepreneurs"	April 2, 2024	N/A
12	5	"HBCUs; DEI; PattiLabelle; Tina Knowles"	May 7, 2024	N/A
13	6	"Autism; O'Shae Sibley; Lenny Kravitz; Country music; Opal Lee"	June 18, 2024	N/A
