= Julie (brand) =

Hormonal medication used for birth control

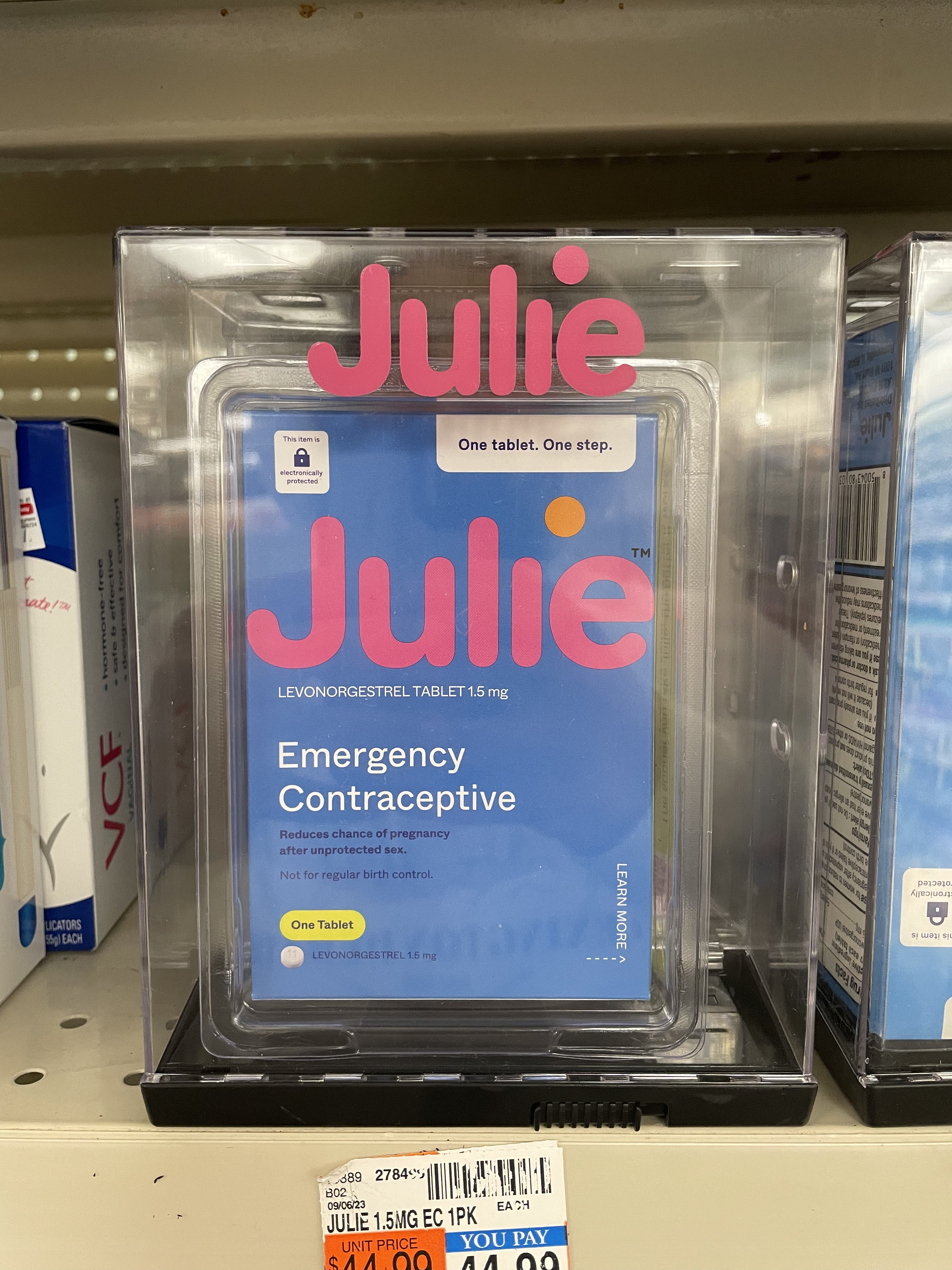

Julie is a healthcare company that markets an "easily accessible" emergency contraception pill. Launched in September 2022, Julie was created with the intention of reducing the stigma around buying emergency contraception to young, modern audiences. The product launched September of 2022 and uses the ingredient, Levonorgestrel.

== Origin ==
Ideation for Julie began in Fall 2021 by Amanda E/J Morrison, Julie Schott, and Brian Bodainick. In an interview with Black Enterprise, Morrison noted the observation of women wanting to feel understood and seen within their community, and applied her experience in cosmetics to education surrounding emergency contraception.

With the overturning of Roe v. Wade in 2022, options for family planning were reduced, notably for women of color. This focus was largely due to a CDC study that indicated non-Hispanic Black women are less likely to use emergency contraception than non-Hispanic White and Hispanic women.

Julie donates a contreception box with every purchase to areas that do not have access to reproductive healthcare, as well as various domestic violence organizations, indigenous communities, Historically black colleges and universities (HBCUs), etc.

== Availability ==
Julie is a non-prescription drug that is available to purchase in 50 U.S. states; sold at 5,600 CVS stores, and 1,500 Target stores. The Julie brand released a two-contraceptive pack to provide extra availability to consumers after the overturning of the Roe v. Wade case.

== Marketing ==
=== Advertisement ===
Julie uses TikTok and video commercials to educate viewers about their product and also debunk sexual misinformation. Julie launched a TikTok-video campaign and influencer promotions in 2022 as part of their marketing strategy. Using TikTok as a way to educate and advertise to their audience, is part of a “refresh…with a perspective shifted toward a younger consumer.” With easy to understand and access content, the company aims to normalize using their product and give consumers the knowledge to make informed decisions.

Julie’s “Your Friends with Benefits” commercial aired in April 2023 with the launch of the two-pack of the Julie emergency contraceptive pill. The commercial depicted two women both in need of the pill at the same time, arguing over the last box. The advertisement was designed to “to tell [this] story in the most compelling, relatable way possible.” A month after airing, it had garnered 7,612,000 impressions on various TV streaming platforms, 9.4 million views on TikTok, and 60,000 views on Instagram.

=== Packaging ===
The pill comes packaged in a blue box with the brand name, "Julie," in large pink letters. The colorful packaging was designed with the intent of eliminating a “second walk of shame” that people may experience when they have to purchase the pill. Amanda E/J Morrison says in an email to Black Enterprise: “What we’re trying to do is give you a little confidence in that walk. Let’s give you a box that’s as beautiful as the other personal care products you’re gonna pick up.” On the back of the box, there is a QR code that leads consumers to frequently asked questions on the Julie website so that they can quickly receive information about the product. As for the motivation for the name of the brand, a professional at Julie said: “We knew we wanted it to be a woman’s name, and during focus groups, someone said, ‘Everyone knows a Julie. She’s friendly.’ And we thought that’s perfect!”
