= Our World with Black Enterprise =

American public affairs TV series

Our World with Black Enterprise is a weekly television show which has been hosted by Paul Brunson, Edward Lansing Gordon III, and, during its first season, Marc Lamont Hill, which is produced by Black Enterprise The show was created by Earl G. Graves Sr. It airs on Saturday and Sunday across a range of local television stations and focuses on various issues of interest to the urban (i.e. Black) general and upwardly mobile community. The show premiered on September 30, 2006. The show received negative criticism in Israel for comments, including those by Marc Lamont Hill, for supporting Palestinians viewed as terrorists by Israel.

The show has criticized superficial Black stereotypes, including Black entertainment programs such as Tyler Perry's sitcoms.
