= Robert J. Patterson (educator) =

American educator

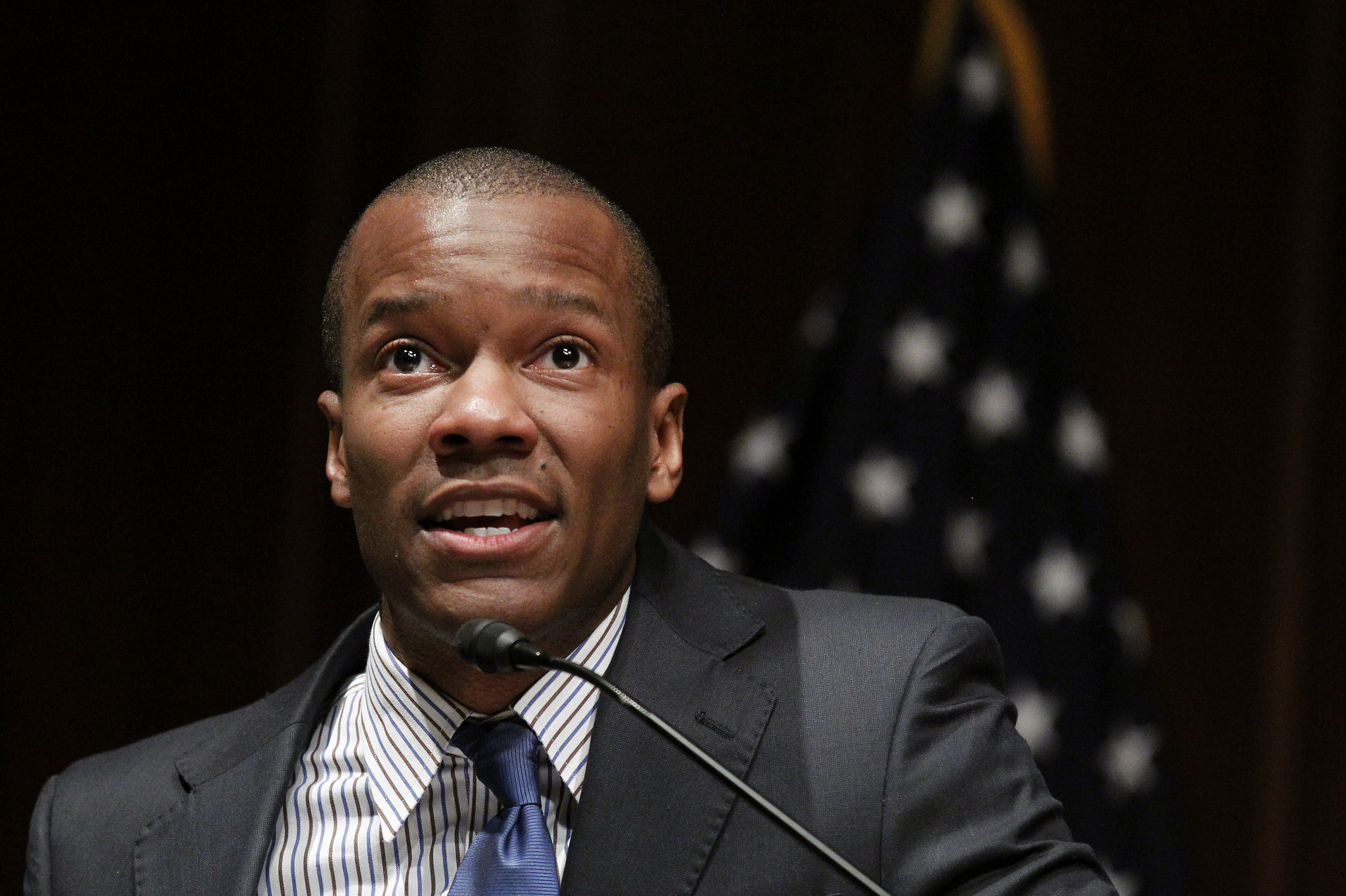
- Dr. Patterson speaking in 2016
- Born: Hartford, Connecticut
- Education: Emory University (Ph.D.); Emory University (M.A.); Georgetown University (B.A.)
- Occupation: African American History Professor

Robert Patterson is an American educator who currently serves as a professor of African American studies at Georgetown University in Washington, D.C. Patterson also served as the co-chair for the development committee for the creation of AP African American Studies.

== Career ==
Patterson attended graduate school after receiving a scholarship from the Hartford Foundation for Public Giving. Upon receiving his Ph.D., Patterson became a professor of history and African American studies at Georgetown University.

In 2016, Patterson became the first chair of the African American Studies department at Georgetown University, holding the position until 2019.

=== AP African American Studies ===
Patterson serves as the co-chair of the committee of teachers who developed College Board's new AP African American Studies course. Patterson, alongside other historians like Henry Louis Gates Jr. and Evelyn Brooks Higginbotham, oversaw the development of the course curriculum. Patterson argues that the purpose of the new course is to teach what American education has neglected; to teach "Black experiences, Black knowledge and Black culture."

In 2023, after Governor Ron DeSantis blocked the course in Florida, Patterson stated that College Board does not cave to the political pressure of the governor of Florida. Patterson accused DeSantis' decision on racism, stating, "I think that part of it has to do with white supremacy and anti-Black racism."

== Publications and works ==
- Black Narratives of Slavery : A Very Short Introduction, 2026
- Black Cultural Production After Civil Rights, 2019
- Destructive Desires: Rhythm and Blues Culture and the Politics of Racial Equality, 2019
- The Psychic Hold of Slavery: Legacies in American Expressive Culture, 2016
- Exodus Politics: Civil Rights and Leadership in African American Literature and Culture, 2013
