= David Coleman (businessman) =

American businessman and educator

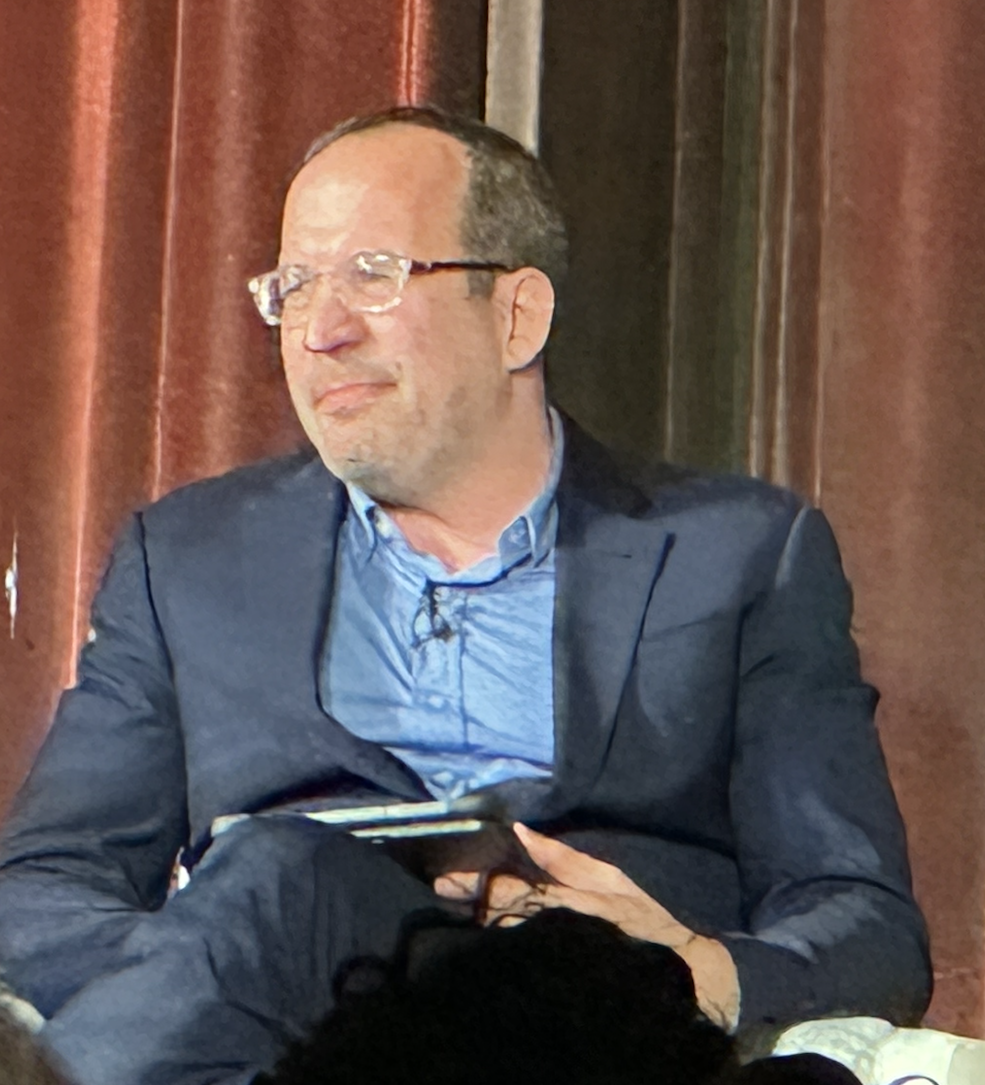
- Coleman speaking at the NMAAHC in 2023
- Born: 1969 (age 56–57); Manhattan, New York City, U.S.
- Education: Yale University (BA); University College, Oxford (BA); University of Cambridge (MPhil)
- Parent: Elizabeth Coleman (mother)

David Coleman (born 1969) is an American businessman, currently serving as the ninth president of the College Board, a not-for-profit organization that designed the SAT exam, SAT Subject Tests, and Advanced Placement (AP) exams.

== Early life and education ==
Coleman was born in Manhattan to a Jewish family. His father is a psychiatrist; his mother, Elizabeth Coleman, was the president of Bennington College from 1987 to 2013. At the time Coleman was growing up, his mother was Dean of The New School in downtown Manhattan. When Coleman was in college, the family had moved to Vermont.

Coleman attended Stuyvesant High School, and earned a B.A. in philosophy from Yale University in 1991. As an undergraduate at Yale, he participated in the Ulysses S. Grant tutoring program in reading for inner-city New Haven high school students. He started Branch, a community service program for inner-city students.

Coleman was awarded a Rhodes Scholarship in 1991 and earned a second B.A. in English literature at University College, Oxford. He then earned a MPhil in classical philosophy from the University of Cambridge. During his stay in England, he met Jason Zimba, a graduate of Williams College and a fellow Rhodes Scholar, who was studying mathematics and physics. The two became good friends and future business partners. Zimba would receive his doctorate in mathematical physics from UC Berkeley in 2001.

== Career ==
Coleman returned to New York City from Oxford intending to work as a high school English teacher, but, according to Todd Balf of the New York Times Magazine, when he realized he wouldn't find a job in the field, he became a consultant at McKinsey & Company. While there, he did some pro bono work for school districts trying to improve performance.

In partnership with Zimba, Coleman then founded The Grow Network, an internet-based consulting organization that analyzed test scores for states and large school districts. In 2001, The Grow Network negotiated contracts directly with Pennsylvania, California, Nevada, New Mexico and New Jersey as well as New York City and Chicago public school districts. In 2004 McGraw-Hill Education, at that time the digital educational division of The McGraw-Hill Companies financial and publishing conglomerate, purchased the organization for an undisclosed sum and renamed it Grow Network/McGraw-Hill. The terms of the acquisition were not disclosed.

In 2007 Coleman and Zimba together with educational analyst Sue Pimentel co-founded Student Achievement Partners (SAP), a non-profit organization which researches and develops "achievement based" assessment standards. Funded in part by the Bill and Melinda Gates Foundation, SAP played a leading role in developing the Common Core State Standards in math and literacy, which focus on "in-depth learning, knowledge across different disciplines, and strong math skills." When Coleman left SAP in October 2012 to head the College Board, Zimba and Pimentel continued to lead the organization, which is now devoted to facilitating the implementation of the Common Core Standards.

== Common Core ==
In 2009, the National Governors Association and the Council of Chief State School Officers launched an initiative to write Common Core State Standards for elementary through high school English Language Arts and Mathematics. The Common Core State Standards aim to prepare students for college and careers by identifying the skills students should learn from kindergarten through high school. Coleman was on the English Language Arts writing team, which was chaired by SAP co-founder Pimentel. SAP co-founder Zimba was a leader on the Mathematics writing team. As of June 2014, the standards have been adopted by 44 states. Other states have not adopted the standards, or have adopted them temporarily then later backed away from adoption.

Since Coleman's departure to head the College Board, Student Achievement Partners has continued to support implementation of the Common Core standards.

== College Board ==
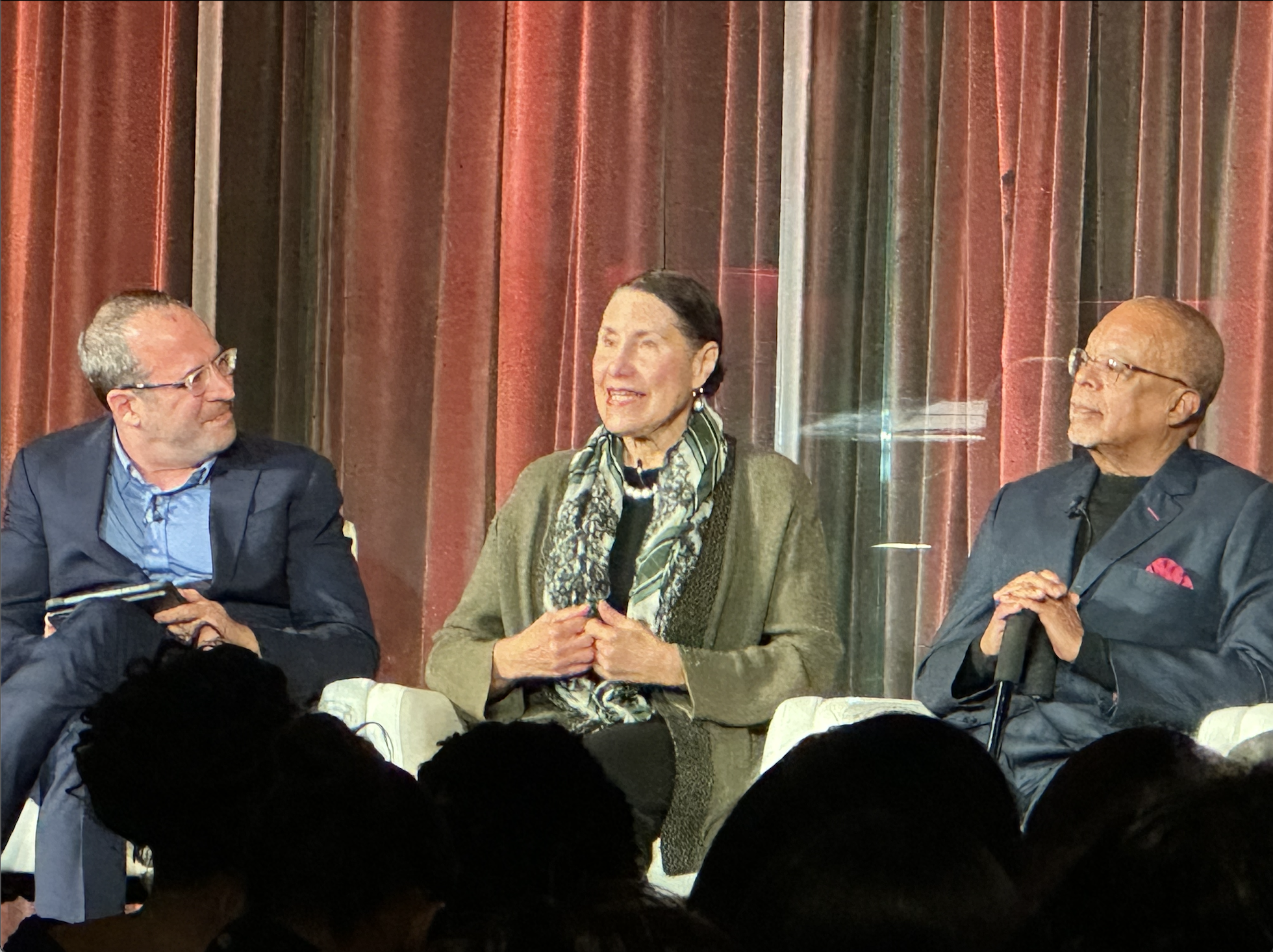
David Coleman (left), Evelyn Brooks Higginbotham (center), and Henry Louis Gates Jr. (right) serve on a panel at the National Museum of African American History and Culture for the launch of AP African American Studies.

On 16 May 2012, College Board chose Coleman as its president for the SAT. Coleman has spoken about the need for the College Board to expand access to college for minority and low-income students who have demonstrated college potential. In 2014, Coleman and the College Board announced a redesign of the SAT, implemented in the spring of 2016. Changes included no penalty for unanswered questions, removal of obscure vocabulary words, making the essay optional, and a partnership with the Khan Academy to provide free test prep resources. The College Board's proposed changes to the SAT were discussed in the New York Times Magazine. Coleman's College Board compensation for FY 2020 was over $2.56 million. College Board under Coleman's leadership faces immense criticism for underpaying teachers, prioritizing revenue over education, and excessively charging for tests, exacerbating economic inequality.

== Educational reform ==
Coleman, Zimba, and Ann-Margaret Michael (Coleman's former assistant and current operations manager for Student Achievement Partners), were the founding board members of Michelle Rhee's StudentsFirst, a lobbying advocacy organization for "standards driven" educational reform. Coleman left the board when he joined the College Board in October 2012.

== Honors ==
Coleman was in the 2013 Time 100, Time magazine's annual list of the 100 most influential people in the world. The encomium was announced in the magazine in an article written by former Florida Governor Jeb Bush, a prominent supporter of the Common Core State Standards. Coleman was also honored by NewSchools Venture Fund, which invests in charter schools, as one of its "Change Agents of the Year for 2012".
