= Marc Lamont Hill =

American academic, writer and activist (born 1978)

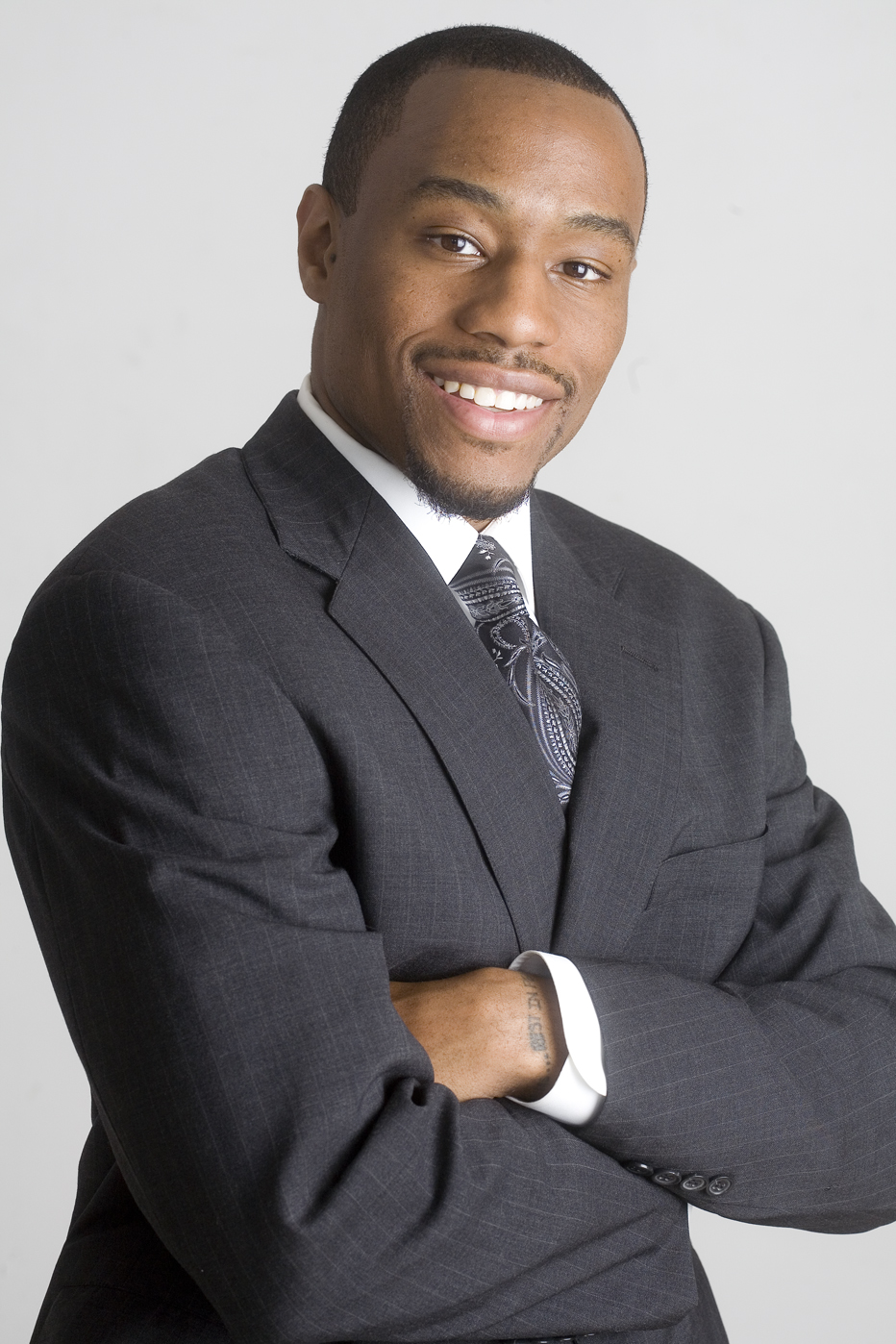
- Hill in 2005
- Born: December 17, 1978 (age 47); Philadelphia, Pennsylvania, U.S.
- Education: Temple University (BS); University of Pennsylvania (MA, PhD)
- Occupations: Academic; commentator; activist; author
- Employer: CUNY Graduate Center
- Political party: Green
- Website: marclamonthill.com

Marc Lamont Hill (born December 17, 1978) is an American academic, author, activist, and television personality. He is a professor of urban education at the CUNY Graduate Center in New York City. He is the host of UpFront on Al Jazeera English, VH1 Live! on VH1, and Basketball Wives reunion shows. He is also a BET News correspondent, and since 2024, has co-hosted The Joe Budden Podcast.

Previously, Hill was the first host of the syndicated television show Our World with Black Enterprise, the host of HuffPost Live, and a political commentator for CNN and Fox News. In November 2018, he was fired from his position at CNN after receiving criticism for a speech he gave before the United Nations on the Israeli–Palestinian conflict in commemoration of the UN's International Day of Solidarity with the Palestinian People. CNN gave no reason for the firing.

== Early life and education ==
Hill was born and raised in Philadelphia. When he was 14, Hill met future NBA star Kobe Bryant at a basketball summer camp, and the two became close friends and remained so until Bryant's death. After graduating from Carver High School, a public school in Philadelphia, Hill attended Morehouse College, one of the nation's most selective HBCUs, but he dropped out while still a freshman because, in his words, he was only "hanging out and getting in trouble". He finished his undergraduate studies back home at Temple University, where he received his B.S. degree in education and Spanish in 2000. He later earned both an M.A. and a Ph.D. from the University of Pennsylvania.

== Career ==
From 2005 to 2009, Hill was a professor of urban education and American studies at Temple University. In the fall of 2009, Hill joined the faculty of Teachers College, Columbia University, as an associate professor of education. He left Teachers College in 2014 to join the faculty at Morehouse College as Distinguished Professor of African American Studies. In May 2017, it was announced that he was re-joining the faculty of Temple University as the Steve Charles Professor of Media, Cities, and Solutions. In August 2023, Hill left Temple University to join the CUNY Graduate Center as a professor of urban education.

Hill worked as a political contributor for Fox News from 2007 until 2009, when he was fired. During this time, he appeared on The O'Reilly Factor, Huckabee, and Hannity. Prior to Fox, Hill was a commentator on CNN and MSNBC, as well as Court TV, where he was a weekly contributor to the Star Jones talk show. In August 2010, he replaced Ed Gordon as host of the syndicated television show Our World with Black Enterprise. In May 2012, he joined Huffington Post as a host of HuffPost Live. In January 2021, Hill was named as the host of UpFront on Al Jazeera English, as the permanent replacement for Mehdi Hasan. In March of the same year, Hill was announced as anchor for Black News Tonight, a primetime show on the Black News Channel which would launch the following month. In 2024, Hill joined The Joe Budden Podcast as a co-host.

== Activism ==
Hill is a founding board member of My5th, a non-profit organization aiming to educate youth about their legal rights and responsibilities. In 2001, he started a literacy project that uses hip-hop culture to increase school engagement and reading skills among high-school students. He also organizes and teaches adult literacy courses for high school dropouts in Philadelphia and Camden. Hill also works with the ACLU Drug Reform Project, focusing on drug informant policy. Hill was named one of America's top 30 black leaders under the age of 30 by Ebony magazine.

In addition, Hill works with African-American and Latino youth. Hill publicly argued for the release of Genarlow Wilson and Shaquanda Cotton. In the Cotton case, Hill organized an internet letter-writing campaign. Hill urged the public to write to District Attorney David McDade to express concerns about his desire to appeal the court's decision to void the sentence of Genarlow Wilson. In May 2013, an article by Hill for Ebony.com entitled "Why Aren't We Fighting for CeCe McDonald?" won the GLAAD Media Award for "Outstanding Digital Journalism Article."

On June 12, 2010, Hill alleged that while driving his car, he was unlawfully stopped by two Philadelphia police officers, one of whom was highly regarded at the time—Officer Richard DeCoatsworth. Hill, represented by his brother, attorney Leonard Hill, filed a civil lawsuit on October 12, 2010, against the City of Philadelphia and four police officers, including DeCoatsworth.

Hill expressed support for the Green Party in the 2016 U.S. presidential election. Of candidates Donald Trump and Hillary Clinton, he stated: "I would rather have Trump be president for four years and build a real left-wing movement that can get us what we deserve as a people, than to let Hillary be president and we stay locked in the same space where we don't get what we want."

== Controversy ==
=== U.N. speech on Israel ===
On November 28, 2018, while speaking in a meeting at the United Nations marking the International Day of Solidarity with the Palestinian People, Hill said: "We have an opportunity to not just offer solidarity in words but to commit to political action, grass-roots action, local action and international action that will give us what justice requires and that is a free Palestine from the river to the sea." The Anti-Defamation League alleged that the phrase "river to the sea" is code, often used by Hamas, for the destruction of Israel.

In November 2018, Hill rejected this characterization, saying this was a "call for justice" referring to the existing borders of the Palestinian territories on the Mediterranean Sea (Gaza) and Jordan River (West Bank). Hill replied, "I support Palestinian freedom. I support Palestinian self-determination. I am deeply critical of Israeli policy and practice. I do not support anti-Semitism, killing Jewish people, or any of the other things attributed to my speech. I have spent my life fighting these things." He also said that the "river to the sea" phrase dates to the early 20th century and "has never been the exclusive province of a particular ideological camp", adding "[t]he idea that this is a Hamas phrase is simply untrue." On December 1, 2018, Hill said that "we must reject anti-Semitism in any form or fashion" and apologized "for the reception of my message". Hill wrote in The Philadelphia Inquirer that "justice will come through a single bi-national democratic state that encompasses Israel, the West Bank, and Gaza."

==== CNN firing ====
Following his comments about Israel before the U.N., Hill's contract with CNN was terminated by the network. This was confirmed on November 29, 2018, when a CNN spokesperson announced that "Marc Lamont Hill is no longer under contract with CNN." CNN gave no reason for firing Hill.

The firing provoked strongly opposing opinions. The move was criticized by pro-Palestinian activists, who viewed it as the network of caving to pressure from pro-Israel groups. Aymann Ismail of Slate magazine said the decision set a "dangerous precedent" which was "another step toward recasting all speech about Israel's brutality as anti-Semitism". Glenn Greenwald remarked that Hill's firing "is a major defeat for the right to advocate for Palestinian rights, to freely critique the Israeli government, and for the ability of journalism and public discourse in the U.S. generally to accommodate dissent."

Bentley Addison of The Forward argued that neither advocating for Palestinian rights, boycotting Israel, nor calling for nonviolent resistance are necessarily antisemitic, but said that Hill's specific wording sounded "eerily similar" to words which had been used by Hamas, writing "the fact that Hill used the rhetoric of groups that are violently anti-Semitic is a real problem, and the fact that he seems to advocate violent resistance against Israel should give pause to every supporter of a peaceful outcome to the conflict."

The board of trustees of Temple University, where Hill was then a tenured professor, released a statement condemning Hill's speech, saying it included what "many regard as promoting violence", and described the phrase "from the river to the sea", used by Hill in his speech, as being "widely perceived as language that threatens the existence of the State of Israel" that "has been used by anti-Israel terror groups". However, the statement also pledged that Temple would remain "open to a wide diversity of thought, opinion, and dialogue by people of all backgrounds." The University also recognized that, as Hill had not been acting as a representative of the school, but rather speaking as private individual, he was therefore entitled to the Constitutional right to freedom of speech; they also noted that "he has through subsequent statements expressly rejected anti-Semitism and anti-Semitic violence". As such, the trustees decided not to dismiss nor discipline Hill.

=== Louis Farrakhan ===
After a meeting with Louis Farrakhan in 2016, Hill said on Instagram: "Been blessed to spend the last day with Minister Louis Farrakhan. An amazing time of learning, listening, laughing, and even head nodding to music. God is Great." The photograph of Hill with Louis Farrakhan, long accused of antisemitism, resurfaced in October 2018. Lamont Hill said at this time that although he disagreed with Farrakhan on some issues, "I will not allow that to be an excuse for allowing dishonest media or poorly intentioned observers to create unnecessary division" adding he would "not be told who to speak to, sit with, or engage." He said he was unaware the image was being used for commercial purposes by the Nation of Islam website and would ask for it to be removed as it was inconsistent with "my values and my professional standards". He said that he did now believe Farrakhan to be an antisemite and was utterly opposed to Farrakhan's then-recent comparison of Jews to termites.

Appearing on The Breakfast Club radio program in December 2018, Hill said that, while he does not agree with Farrakhan on all issues:

For some reason, if you meet with Minister Farrakhan and you don't throw him away wholesale, then you're castigated in a way that doesn't happen with anybody else. Why is only one set of people untouchable? And why does every black leader have to ritually denounce Farrakhan in order to sustain a position? That doesn't happen to anyone else.

== Books ==
- Hill, Marc Lamont; Brewster, Todd (2022). Seen and Unseen: Technology, Social Media, and the Fight for Racial Justice. Atria Books. ISBN 978-1-98218-041-6
- Hill, Marc Lamont; Plitnick, Mitchell (2021). Except for Palestine. The Limits of Progressive Politics. New Press. ISBN 978-1-62097-592-3.
- Hill, Marc Lamont; Barat, Frank (Editor); Taylor, Keeanga-Yamahtta (2020). We Still Here: Pandemic, Policing, Protest, & Possibility. Haymarket Books. ISBN 978-1-64259-474-4
- Hill, Marc Lamont (2016). Nobody: Casualties of America's War on the Vulnerable, from Ferguson to Flint and Beyond. Simon and Schuster. ISBN 9781-5011-2494-5.
- Hill, Marc Lamont (and Mumia Abu-Jamal) (2012). The Classroom and The Cell: Conversations on Black Life in America. Third World Press. ISBN 978-0-8837-8337-5.
- Hill, Marc Lamont (2009). Beats, Rhymes, and Classroom Life: Hip-Hop Pedagogy and the Politics of Identity. Teachers College Press. ISBN 978-0-8077-4960-9.
- Hill, Marc Lamont (2007). Media, Learning, and Sites of Possibility (New Literacies and Digital Epistemologies). Peter Lang Publishing. ISBN 978-0-8204-8656-7.
