= Dennis Daley =

American football player (born 1996)

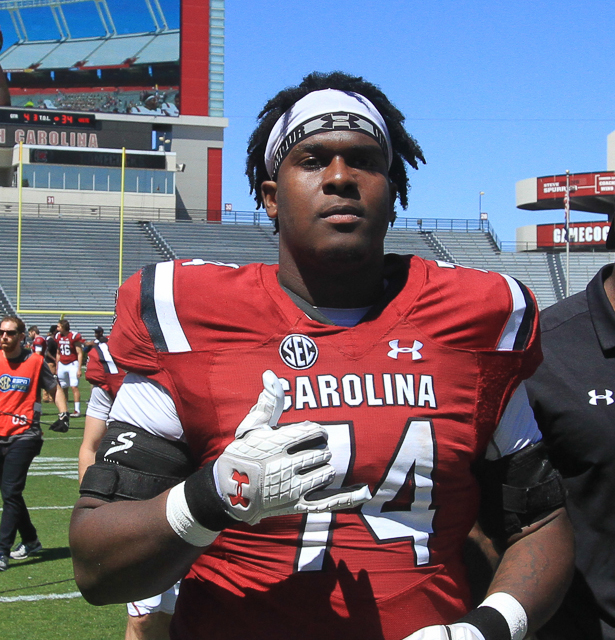
- Daley with the South Carolina Gamecocks in 2018

No. 78
- Position: Offensive tackle

Personal information
- Born: August 7, 1996 (age 30); Fort Lauderdale, Florida, U.S.
- Listed height: 6 ft 6 in (1.98 m)
- Listed weight: 325 lb (147 kg)

Career information
- High school: Ridge View (Columbia, South Carolina)
- College: Georgia Military College (2015–2016); South Carolina (2017–2018)
- NFL draft: 2019: 6th round, 212th overall pick

Career history
- Carolina Panthers (2019–2021); Tennessee Titans (2022); Arizona Cardinals (2023); Jacksonville Jaguars (2024)*
- * Offseason or practice squad member only

Career NFL statistics
- Games played: 54
- Games started: 37
- Stats at Pro Football Reference

Dennis Daley (born August 7, 1996) is an American former professional football player who was an offensive tackle in the National Football League (NFL). He played college football for the South Carolina Gamecocks and was selected in the sixth round of the 2019 NFL draft by the Carolina Panthers. Daley played his first three seasons in the NFL with the Panthers before being traded to the Tennessee Titans in 2022. He then signed with the Cardinals in 2023.

== Early life ==
Daley is of Jamaican descent. He is a native of Columbia, South Carolina. Daley attended Ridge View High School.

== College career ==
Despite having already signed with the University of South Carolina, Daley spent the first two seasons of his collegiate career at Georgia Military College as a result of not qualifying for enrollment at South Carolina immediately after high school. He called his time at GMC "the toughest two years of [his] life", but also credits it for making him more disciplined. Daley began attending South Carolina in 2017 where he was a two-year starter for the South Carolina Gamecocks and started 23 games at left tackle.

Daley graduated from South Carolina in December 2018 with a degree in interdisciplinary studies before playing in the 2019 Senior Bowl.

== Professional career ==
Pre-draft measurables
Height	Weight	Arm length	Hand span	40-yard dash	10-yard split	20-yard split	20-yard shuttle	Three-cone drill	Vertical jump	Broad jump	Bench press
6 ft 5 in (1.96 m)	317 lb (144 kg)	33 3/8 in (0.85 m)	9 1/2 in (0.24 m)	5.23 s	1.84 s	3.09 s	4.92 s	7.95 s	26.5 in (0.67 m)	8 ft 7 in (2.62 m)	20 reps
All values from NFL Combine

=== Carolina Panthers ===
Daley was selected by the Carolina Panthers in the sixth round (212th overall) of the 2019 NFL draft. He started nine games at left tackle his rookie season.

In 2020, Daley started three games, two at right guard and one at left tackle. On December 22, 2020, he was placed on injured reserve.

Daley started nine games in 2021 but played in 15.

=== Tennessee Titans ===
On August 29, 2022, Daley and a 2024 seventh-round pick were traded to the Tennessee Titans in exchange for a 2024 fifth-round pick.

Daley was made the starting left tackle following an injury to Taylor Lewan on the first offensive play of the Titans' Week 2 game against the Buffalo Bills. Daley started for the Titans at left tackle for the rest of the season. Despite being part of the offensive line that blocked for Derrick Henry as he finished second in the league in rushing yards, Daley finished the season tied in the league for the most sacks allowed. At the end of the season, Pro Football Focus ranked the Titans' offensive line the worst in the league.

=== Arizona Cardinals ===
On March 21, 2023, Daley signed a two-year contract with the Arizona Cardinals. He was placed on injured reserve on August 31, 2023. Daley was activated on October 14. He finished the season playing in four games starting one.

On August 19, 2024, Daley was released by the Cardinals.

=== Jacksonville Jaguars ===
On November 5, 2024, Daley was signed to the Jacksonville Jaguars practice squad. He signed a reserve/future contract with Jacksonville on January 6, 2025. On August 3, the Jaguars announced Daley would be retiring from professional football.
