= Elizabeth Coleman =

American academic administrator

9th President of Bennington College
- In office 1987–2013
- Preceded by: Michael Hooker
- Succeeded by: Mariko Silver

Personal details
- Born: 1937 (age 88–89)
- Relations: David Coleman (son)
- Education: University of Chicago (B.A.); Cornell University (M.A.); Columbia University (Ph.D.)

Elizabeth Coleman (born 1937) was the ninth president of Bennington College from 1987 to 2013. Coleman also served as the founding Dean of the College of Arts and Sciences at The New School for Social Research.

== Education ==
Coleman graduated with honors from the University of Chicago, where she was a Ford Foundation Scholar, and completed her master's degree in English and American Literature at Cornell University, where she was a Woodrow Wilson Fellow. She received her Ph.D. with distinction at Columbia University, where she was a Woodbridge and President's Fellow.

== Career ==
Coleman began her career as a professor at Stony Brook University. She then founded the College of Arts and Sciences at The New School for Social Research, where she served as dean. She was appointed president of Bennington College in 1987, and served until her retirement in 2013. She was succeeded by Mariko Silver, a former administrator at Arizona State University and United States Department of Homeland Security official.

== Personal life ==
Coleman is the mother of David Coleman, a businessman and current president of the College Board.
