= Ed Gordon (journalist) =

American television journalist (born 1960)

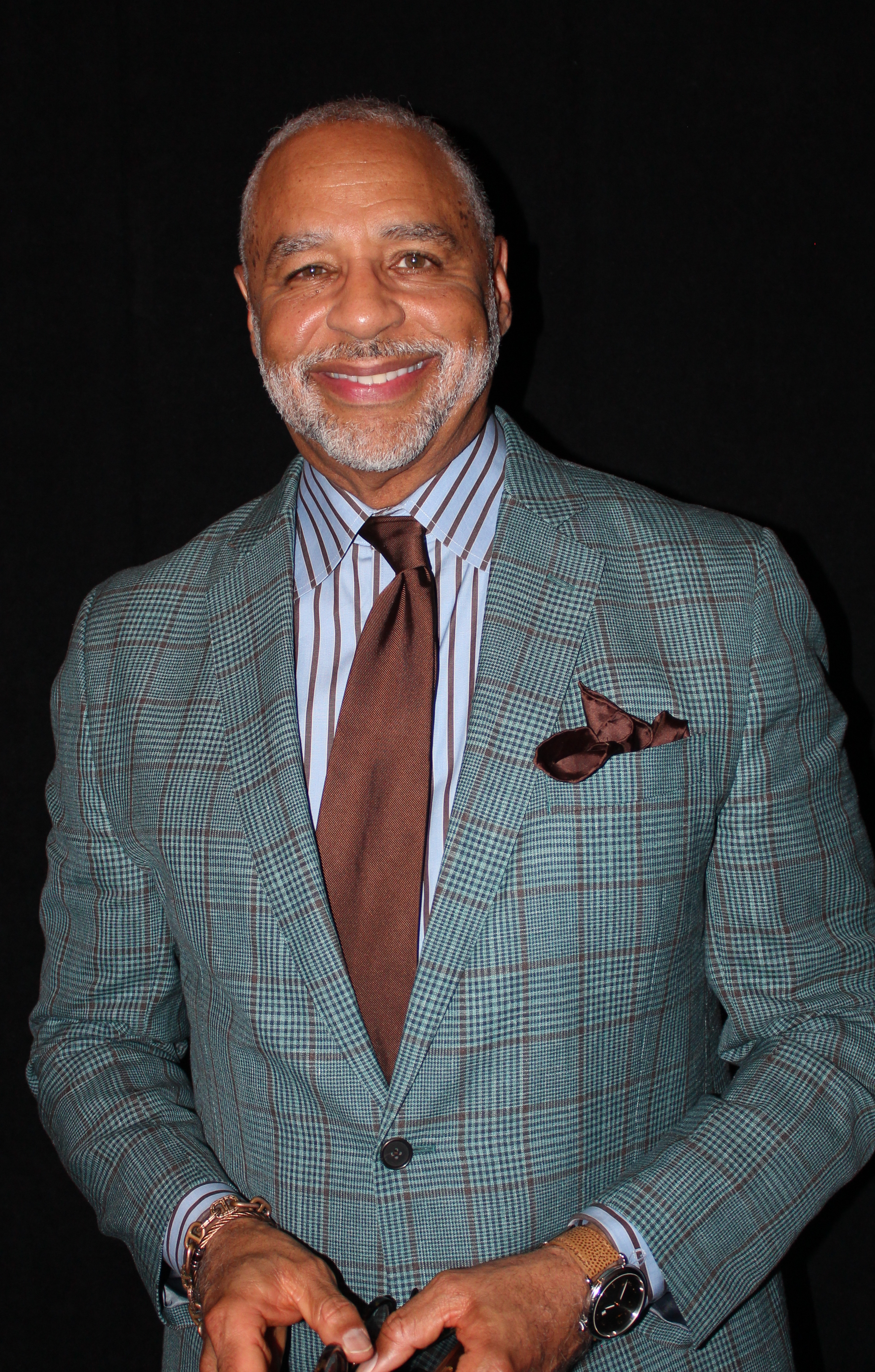
- Gordon at 2025 National Urban League Conference.
- Born: Edward Lansing Gordon III; August 17, 1960 (age 65); Detroit, Michigan, U.S.
- Education: Western Michigan University (BA)
- Occupations: Television journalist, talk show host
- Years active: 1986 – present
- Spouse(s): Karen Haney (divorced); Leslie Howard (current)
- Children: 1
- Parent(s): Ed Gordon Jr. Jimmie Hunt
- Website: EdGordon.net

Edward Lansing Gordon III (born August 17, 1960) is an American television journalist known for his association with BET over four different decades. A native of Detroit, Ed Gordon is the son of an Olympic athlete also named Ed Gordon. The younger Gordon was BET's main news anchor from 1988 to 1996 and again from 2000 to 2001 before hosting the interview show BET Tonight from 2001 to 2002 and another interview show, Weekly with Ed Gordon, from 2010 to 2011.

In addition to his work with BET, Gordon also worked for NBC News from 1996 to 2000, CBS News from 2004 to 2005, and NPR from 2005 to 2006. From 2006 to 2010, he hosted the syndicated talk show Our World with Black Enterprise.

== Personal background ==
Gordon was born in Detroit, Michigan. His father Ed Gordon Jr. (1908–1971) was a schoolteacher who won gold in the 1932 Summer Olympics for competing in the long jump, and his mother Jimmie (née Hunt) (1920–2015) was also a teacher. After graduating from Cass Technical High School in Detroit, the younger Gordon graduated from Western Michigan University in 1982 with a Bachelor of Arts degree in communications and political science.

== Career ==
=== Early career in Detroit (1983–1988) ===
Although Gordon considered law school, Gordon aspired to be a television journalist and took an unpaid internship at WTVS, the PBS affiliate in Detroit. At WTVS, he worked as a production assistant from 1983 to 1985. In 1986, Gordon became host of a local weekly talk show, Detroit Black Journal, which had a yearly salary of $11,000. On the side, Gordon worked as a freelance journalist at the then-fledgling cable network Black Entertainment Television (BET).

=== First stint with BET (1988–1996) ===
In 1988, Gordon joined BET full-time as anchor of the weekly program BET News, which covered African-American social issues and popular culture. While Gordon worked at BET, its news staff had only around 20 people, and Gordon produced most of his interviews with only one or two assistants.

Beginning in 1990, Gordon also hosted hour-long interviews on several occasions in the series Conversation with Ed Gordon. His subjects have included President Bill Clinton, actor/director, rapper Tupac Shakur, Sidney Poitier, and singer Whitney Houston. Following the 1992 Los Angeles riots, Gordon hosted a BET special, L.A. Aftermath: Black Men Speak Out and conducted the first interview with U.S. President George H. W. Bush after the riots.

On January 25, 1996, Gordon became the first journalist to interview former NFL star O. J. Simpson since Simpson was acquitted of murder the previous year.

=== Career with NBC (1996–2000) ===
In July 1996, Gordon left BET to join NBC News, where he began as a daytime anchor and host of weekly talk and interview program Internight on NBC's cable network MSNBC as well as a contributor to NBC's morning show Today. At MSNBC, Gordon covered major news events of the late 1990s such as the Republican and Democratic National Conventions of 1996, the impeachment of Bill Clinton, the crash of Swissair Flight 111, and Pope John Paul II's 1998 visit to Cuba. Beginning in March 1999, Gordon became a regular correspondent on Dateline NBC.

=== Second stint with BET (2000–2004) ===
Gordon returned to BET in 2000 to host BET News, this time on a nightly basis.

In 2001, Gordon replaced Tavis Smiley as host of interview program BET Tonight. Two interviews Gordon conducted for BET Tonight in 2002 attracted outside attention. The May 8 edition broadcast an interview by Gordon with popular R&B singer R. Kelly, who was facing charges for child pornography. In the interview, Kelly denied the accusations of child abuse. Kelly told Gordon: "I've done a lot of wrong things in my life, but I'm not a criminal."

Then on December 16, the program showed his interview with outgoing Senate Minority Leader Trent Lott (Republican of Mississippi) following Lott's controversial remarks at the 100th birthday party for fellow Senator Strom Thurmond that the nation would have been better off had Thurmond, a segregationist, been elected for president in 1948. Howard Rosenberg of the Los Angeles Times described Gordon as "polite but firm" in the interview: "Without being a bully, he held Lott's tongue to the fire...not allowing the senator to dodge, finesse or answer questions that weren't asked."

As part of a reorganization focusing on entertainment productions, BET cut its news staff and canceled BET Tonight in December 2002 along with other public affairs shows hosted by Gordon, Lead Story and Teen Summit. Gordon continued to be a contributor to BET through 2004, when he interviewed Democratic presidential candidate and U.S. senator John Kerry for a Speak Now special broadcast October 8.

=== CBS and NPR (2004–2006) ===
Gordon became a correspondent for the CBS News program 60 Minutes II in November 2004; the show ran until 2005. After Tavis Smiley left National Public Radio (NPR), Gordon began hosting a show on NPR titled News & Notes, a show with a similar focus on African-American issues that he hosted from 2005 to 2006.

=== Recent work (Since 2006) ===
From 2006 to 2010, Gordon hosted the syndicated talk show Our World with Black Enterprise.

BET announced in March 2010 that Gordon would return to the network to host "a variety of news programs and specials." Gordon's latest series Weekly with Ed Gordon premiered on October 3, 2010, with a one-on-one interview with Representative Charles B. Rangel, who was undergoing an ethics issues at the time. In the program, Gordon also discusses news and culture with a four-member panel. The show ran until March 2011.

In the fall of 2016, Gordon hosted a weekly primetime newsmagazine on Bounce TV, Ed Gordon.

In 2020, Gordon released a book, Conversations in Black: On Power, Politics, and Leadership.

In 2023, he returned to BET as a reporter for the newsmagazine America in Black, a co-production with the CBS News. He also appeared several times on the second season, released in 2024. He interviewed President Joe Biden in July 2024.

== Awards ==
- Emmy Award
- NAACP Image Award
- National Association of Black Journalists Journalist of the Year award
- Communication Excellence to Black Audiences Award for Merit
- Named in People Magazine's "50 Most Beautiful People in the World" list

== Personal life ==
Gordon has a daughter, Taylor (born 1993), from his previous marriage to Karen Haney. During his career with Washington, D.C.–based BET, he lived in nearby Alexandria, Virginia. Now married to Leslie Howard, Gordon is the stepfather of two children.
