= VH1 Live! =

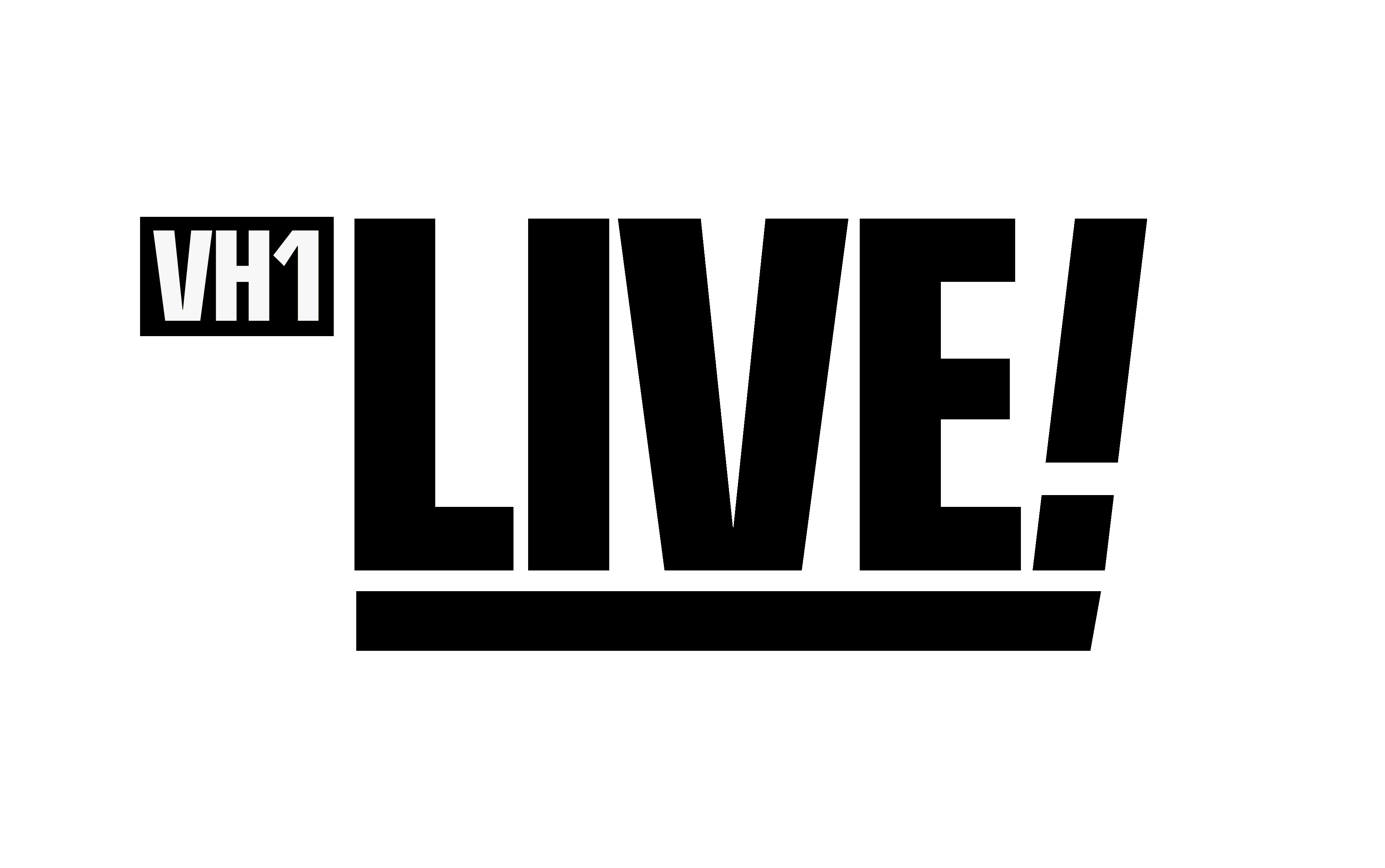
- Starring: Marc Lamont Hill
- Country of origin: United States
- No. of seasons: 2
- No. of episodes: 16

Production
- Production company: Embassy Row Productions

Original release
- Network: VH1
- Release: July 17 – September 20, 2016

VH1 Live! is a late-night talk show that currently airs on VH1. Hosted by Marc Lamont Hill, the show focuses on pop culture, current events, and the lives of VH1 personalities.

== Episodes ==
No.	Guest(s)	Original release date	US viewers (millions)
1	Shaunie O'Neal, Stevie J	July 17, 2016	0.639
2	Jackie Christie, Naturi Naughton	July 24, 2016	0.589
3	Brandi Maxiell, Dascha Polanco	July 31, 2016	0.410
4	Malaysia Pargo, Scrappy	August 7, 2016	0.465
5	LaTosha Duffey, Moniece, Fizz	August 14, 2016	0.361
6	Love & Hip Hop: Hollywood cast	August 15, 2016	1.928
7	Apryl, Joseph Sikora, Omari Hardwick, Enrique Murciano	August 21, 2016	0.361
8	Masika, Angie Martinez	August 22, 2016	0.624
9	Yung Joc, Shameik Moore, Brandi Boyd, Jessica Dime	August 29, 2016	N/A
10	Pooch Hall, Nikki Mudarris	September 12, 2016	N/A
11	Evelyn Lozada, Rocsi Diaz, Rotimi	September 13, 2016	N/A
12	Charlamagne tha God, Lance Bass, David Dees	September 14, 2016	N/A
13	RuPaul, Adrienne C. Moore, Brian Tyree Henry	September 15, 2016	N/A
14	Safaree, Angel Brinks, Teairra Mari	September 19, 2016	N/A
15	Bell Biv Devoe, Sevyn Streeter, Momma Dee	September 20, 2016	N/A
