= Ridge View High School =

Location
- 4801 Hard Scrabble Road; Columbia, South Carolina 29229; United States

Information
- Type: Public secondary college-preparatory school
- Motto: Excellence in Education
- Established: 1995 (31 years ago)
- School district: Richland County School District Two
- Principal: Brenda Mack-Foxworth
- Staff: 97.33 (FTE)
- Grades: 9–12
- Enrollment: 1,696 (2023-2024)
- Student to teacher ratio: 17.43
- Colors: Purple and silver (Black and White Accent Colors)
- Athletics: Baseball, basketball, cheerleading, cross country, football, golf, lacrosse, rifle, soccer, swimming, tennis, track & field, wrestling
- Athletics conference: Region IV-AAAAA
- Mascot: Blazer
- Website: www.richland2.org/rvh

Ridge View High School (commonly abbreviated as RVHS) is a comprehensive public high school in Columbia, South Carolina. It currently holds approximately 1700 students. It is one of five high schools in Richland County School District Two along Spring Valley High School, Blythewood High School, Westwood High School, and Richland Northeast High School. The principal for the 2022-2023 school year is Brenda Mack-Foxworth.

As of 2013, the size of the facility is 238,755 square feet, and the school is built on a 60-acre campus.

== Demographics ==
Ridge View High School has an 85% minority enrollment percentage. The school's ethnicity/racial category percentages are: African-American 79%, Caucasian 10%, Hispanic 6%, Asian 2%, Two or More Races 4%, Native Hawaiian/Pacific Islander 0.3%, and American Indian/Alaskan Native 0%.

== Academics ==
Ridge View has an average GPA of 3.2. Beginning in 2022, Ridge View became one of approximately 60 schools in the United States, and the only school in South Carolina, to pilot the AP African American Studies course.

== Marching band ==
The Ridge View Marching Band was featured in the 2013 6abc Dunkin' Donuts Thanksgiving Day Parade in Philadelphia, Pennsylvania. The band has also placed 2nd at the 4A State Championships in 2014 and 2016.

== Athletics ==
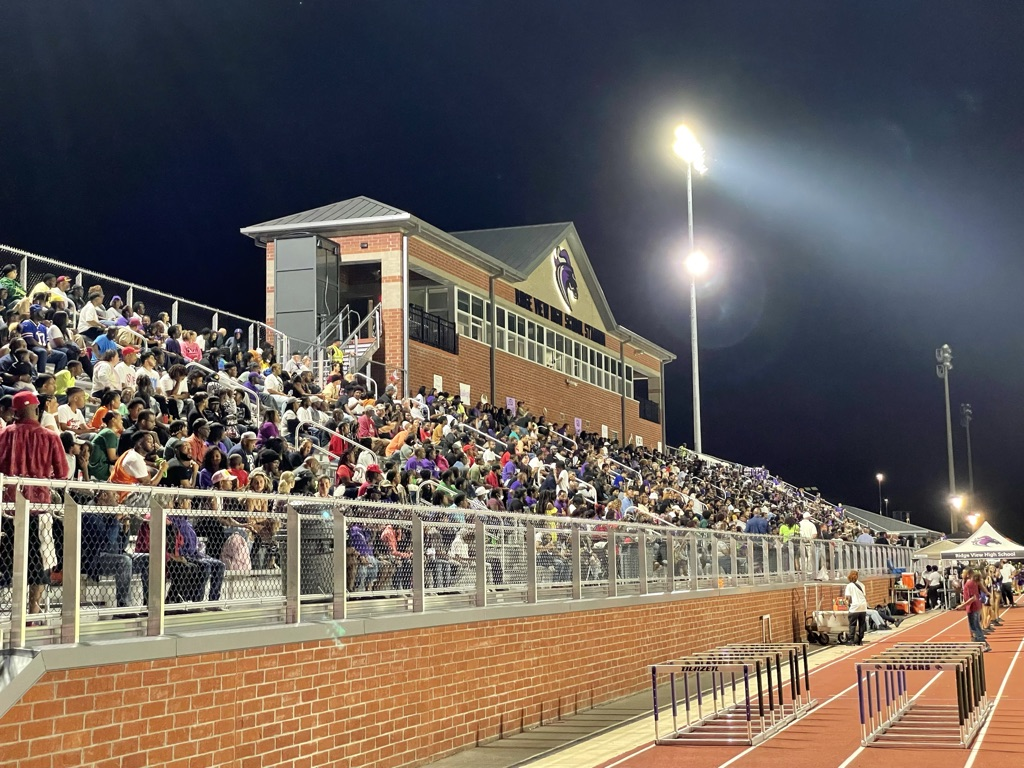
Ridge View High School football game

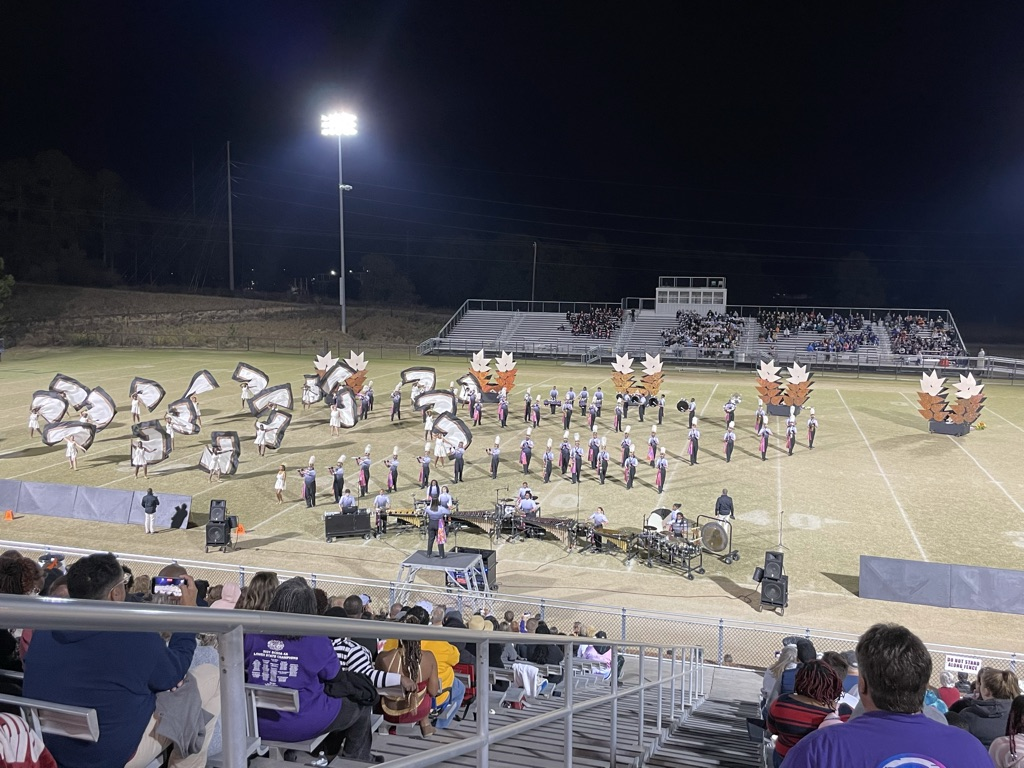
Ridge View marching band at White Knoll High School, 2022.

The Blazer Boys Soccer Team won consecutive Lower State Championships in 2000 and 2001. The 2001 Boys Soccer Team climbed to number 1 in the nation during the season and finished the 2001 season ranked in the top 10 Nationally.

The Blazer Boys Track and Field Team won three consecutive state championships in 2004, 2005, and 2006. During those victories, they set state records in the 4x800 relay and the record for most points ever scored in the state meet.

The Blazer Boys basketball team won the 2017–2018 4A State Championship. The Blazer Boys Basketball team repeated as State Champions in 2018–2019, 2019-2020 and won a fourth state championship in 2021-2022, and in 2023-2024 they won a fifth state championship.

The Ridge View Girls Track team claimed the 2018 AAAA State Championship.

The Blazers football team is a consistent playoff contender. The 1998 team reached the 4A Div 2 State Championship, losing to Marlboro County. The 2007 team advanced to the semifinal round of the state playoffs, losing to the eventual state champion Clover. The Blazer Football team has advanced to the third round of the playoffs two out of the last three seasons. In 2022, the football team was forced to forfeit all games on charges of recruiting.

The Blazer Boys Cross Country Running team finished 2nd in the state in 2001, 2004, 2009, and 2010. The team won the Region Championship in 2002, 2004, 2007, 2008, 2009, and 2010.

The Blazer Girls Cross Country Running team won the Region Championship in 2011 and 2012.

Ridge View established their boys lacrosse team in the fall of 2003 and in their first season as a varsity team posted a record of 17–2 in the regular season before falling in the state semifinals to Greenville in an 8–7 overtime defeat.

== In popular culture ==
In February 2023, Ridge View High was featured on the television show America in Black. The segment focuses on the implementation of the new AP African American Studies course launched by College Board in 2022. The spotlight includes interviews from the course teacher, Daniel Soderstrom, and a junior student, in addition to excerpts from the class lesson on The Harlem Renaissance. The episode gained 1.5 million views on its first airing and 2.7 million more in online streaming views. CNN and CBS also interviewed Soderstrom and students at the school. Ridge View was the first high school in South Carolina to offer the new AP African American Studies course. Several students advocated for the course with the NAACP and the American Civil Liberties Union when the South Carolina Department of Education stated that the course could only be taught at the honors level rather than the advanced-placement level.

== Notable alumni ==
- Jarrell Brantley, basketball player, formerly played for Utah Jazz
- Brian Quick, former professional football player for St. Louis Rams
- Dennis Daley, professional football player Tennessee Titans
- Chazwick Bundick, musician, Toro y Moi (born in 1986, graduated from USC)
- G. G. Jackson, professional basketball player
- Darell Scott, former professional football player
- Jonny Weston, actor
- Jasmine Sanders, model
- Speaker Knockerz, Rapper and Producer
