= Black Enterprise =

African-American-owned multimedia company

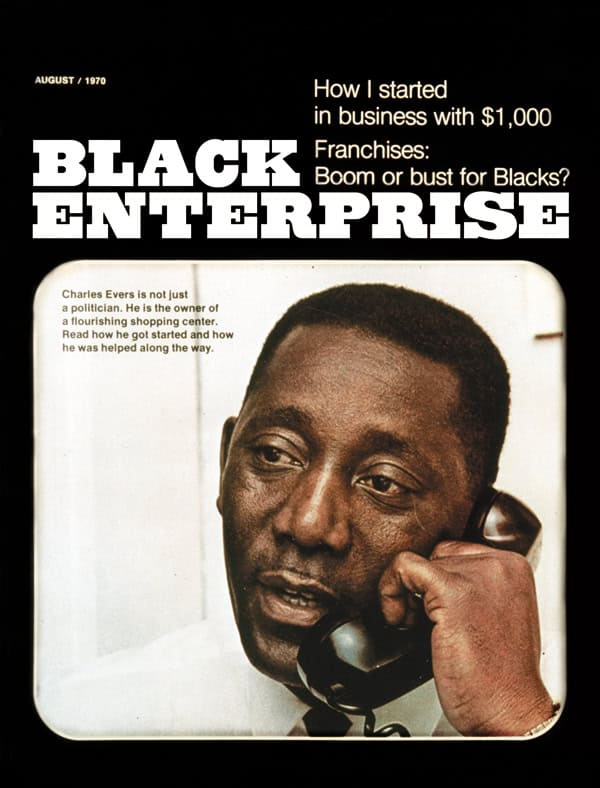
- Cover of the first issue (August 1970), featuring Charles Evers
- Editor-in-Chief: Derek T. Dingle
- Frequency: Bimonthly
- Publisher: Earl G. Graves Sr.
- Total circulation: 534,752 (2013)
- First issue: 1970
- Company: Earl G. Graves Publishing Company, Inc.
- Country: United States
- Based in: New York City
- Website: blackenterprise.com
- ISSN: 0006-4165
- OCLC: 1257165402

Black Enterprise (stylized in all caps) is an American multimedia company. A Black-owned business since the 1970s, its flagship product Black Enterprise magazine has covered African American businesses with a readership of 3.7 million. The company was founded in 1970 by Earl G. Graves Sr. It publishes in print and digital, an annual listing of the largest African-American companies in the country, or "B.E. 100s", first compiled and published in 1973. In 2002, the magazine launched a supplement targeting teens, Teenpreneur. Black Enterprise also has two nationally syndicated television shows, Our World with Black Enterprise and Women of Power.

== History ==
The magazine was founded by Earl G. Graves Sr. In January 2006, he named his eldest son, Earl G. Graves Jr. (known as "Butch"), the company's chief executive officer. Butch joined the company in 1988 after earning his M.B.A. from Harvard University; he received his bachelor's degree in economics from Yale University in 1984. He also sits on the board of directors of AutoZone, serving as lead director and chairman of the compensation committee.

Black Enterprise has been profitable since its 10th issue. The company, headquartered in New York City, has 58 employees and had revenues of $22 million in 2017.

== Award ==
Black Enterprise won the 1997 FOLIO: Editorial Excellence Award in the business/finance consumer magazine category.

== See also ==
- Black capitalism
- List of magazines
