= Valerie Thomas =

American data scientist and inventor

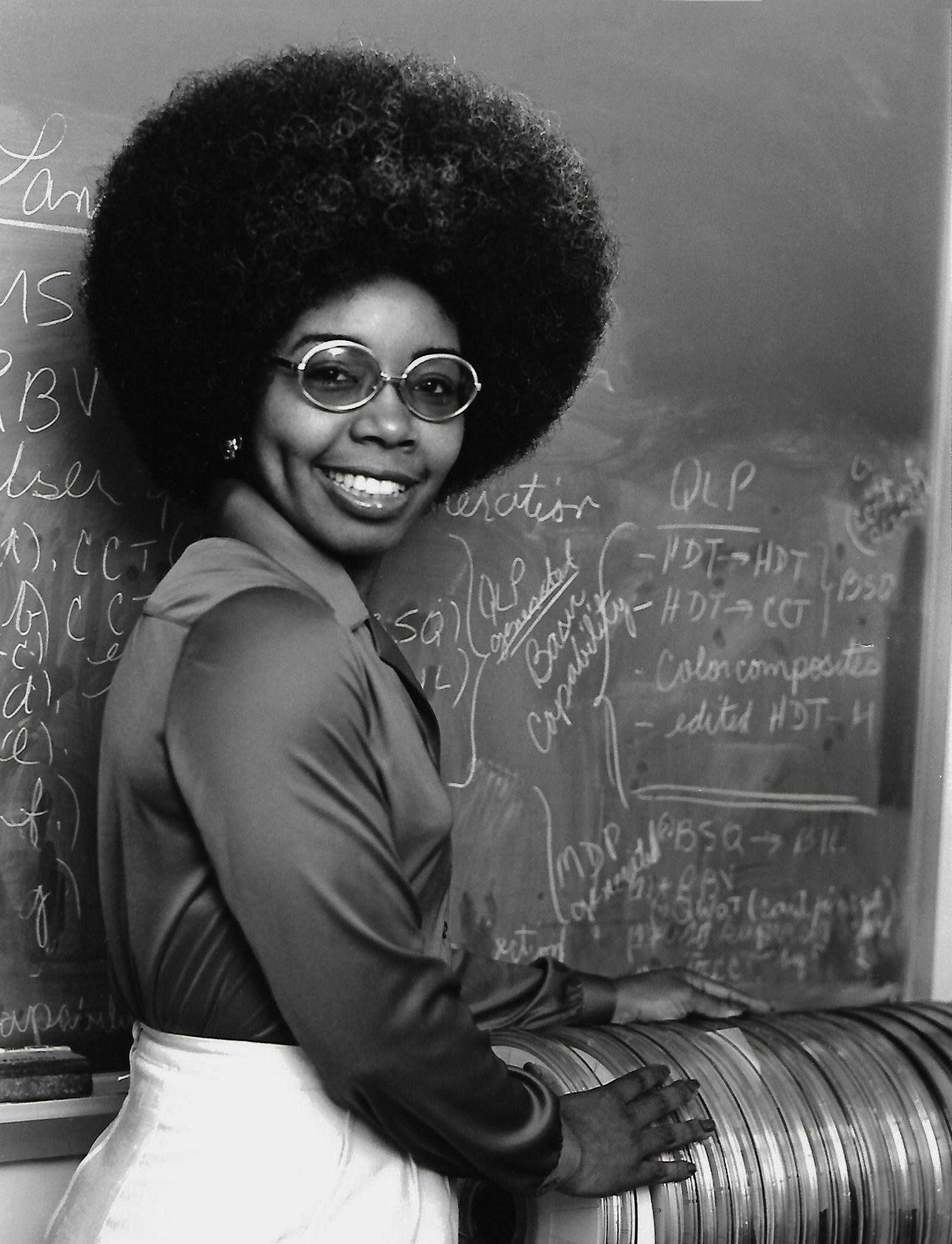
- NASA photograph of Thomas next to a stack of early Landsat Computer Compatible Tapes, 1979
- Born: February 8, 1943 (age 83); Maryland, United States
- Education: Morgan State University; George Washington University; University of Delaware; Simmons College Graduate School of Management
- Known for: Inventor of the illusion transmitter
- Scientific career
- Workplaces: NASA Goddard; UMBC

Valerie L. Thomas (born February 8, 1943) is an American data scientist and inventor. She invented the illusion transmitter, for which she received a patent in 1980. She was responsible for developing the digital media formats that image processing systems used in the early years of NASA's Landsat program. Being born in Baltimore, Maryland during racial segregation, Thomas had to overcome many barriers to graduate from Morgan State University. She graduated with honors in 1964 with a degree in physics. She went on the work at NASA for 31 years which included leadership on multiple projects like the Large Area Crop Inventory Experiment (LACIE) and Space Physics Analysis Network (SPAN). After retiring in 1995, Thomas continued to mentor underrepresented youth in STEM fields. She was inducted into the National Inventors Hall of Fame in 2018 which recognized her contributions to satellite communication and remote sensing technology.

== Early life and education ==
Thomas was born in Baltimore, Maryland. She graduated from high school in 1961, during the era of integration. She attended Morgan State University, where she was one of two women majoring in physics. Thomas excelled in her mathematics and science courses at Morgan State University, graduating with a degree in physics with highest honors in 1964.

== Career ==
Thomas began working for NASA as a data analyst in 1964. She developed real-time computer data systems to support satellite operation control centers (1964–1970). She oversaw the creation of the Landsat program and her participation in the program expanded upon the works of other NASA scientists in the pursuit of being able to visualize Earth from space.

In 1974, Thomas headed a team of approximately 50 people for the Large Area Crop Inventory Experiment (LACIE), a joint effort with the NASA Johnson Space Center, the National Oceanic and Atmospheric Administration (NOAA), and the U.S. Department of Agriculture. LACIE demonstrated the feasibility of using satellites to automate the process of predicting wheat yield on a worldwide basis.

She attended a science exhibition in 1976 that included an illusion of a light bulb that appeared to be lit, even though it had been removed from its socket. The illusion, which involved another light bulb and concave mirrors, inspired Thomas. In response to her curiosity, she began her researching a potential patent in 1977. This involved creating an experiment in which she observed how the position of a concave mirror would affect the real object that is reflected through it. Through her discovery and experimentation, she would invent an optical device called the illusion transmitter. On October 21, 1980, she obtained the patent for the illusion transmitter, a device NASA adopted and which was later adapted for screens on devices ranging from surgery tools to televisions. Thomas became associate chief of the Space Science Data Operations Office at NASA. Thomas's invention has been depicted in a children's fictional book, television, and in video games.

In 1985, as the NSSDC Computer Facility manager, Thomas was responsible for a major consolidation and reconfiguration of two previously independent computer facilities. She then served as the Space Physics Analysis Network (SPAN) project manager from 1986 to 1990 during a period when SPAN underwent a major reconfiguration and grew from a scientific network with approximately 100 computer nodes to one directly connecting approximately 2,700 computer nodes worldwide. Thomas' team was credited with developing a computer network that connected research stations of scientists from around the world to improve scientific collaboration.

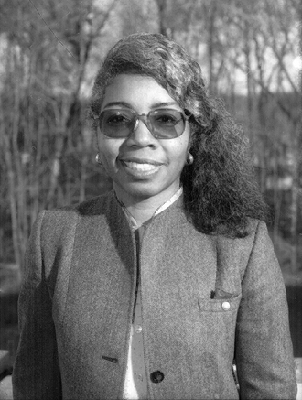
NASA photograph of Valerie Thomas in 1995

In 1990, SPAN became a major part of NASA's science networking and today's Internet. She also participated in projects related to Halley's Comet, ozone research, satellite technology, and the Voyager spacecraft.

She mentored students in the Mathematics Aerospace Research and Technology Inc. program. Thomas often spoke to groups of students from elementary school, secondary, college, and university ages, as well as adult groups. As a role model for her community, she visits schools and national meetings over the years. She has mentored students working in summer programs at Goddard Space Flight Center. She also judged at science fairs, working with organizations such as the National Technical Association (NTA) and Women in Science and Engineering (WISE).

At the end of August 1995, she retired from NASA and her positions of associate chief of the NASA Space Science Data Operations Office, manager of the NASA Automated Systems Incident Response Capability, and as chair of the Space Science Data Operations Office Education Committee.

== Illusion Transmitter ==
In 1976, Thomas went to a science exhibition which featured an optical illusion using concave mirrors. These mirrors made it seem like a light bulb was glowing even though it was unscrewed from the socket. After being inspired by the optical illusion, she started researching how these parabolic mirrors could send three dimensional images across distances. From 1977 to 1980, Thomas conducted experiments to explore the principles behind the three-dimensional image creation and transmission. On October 21, 1980, she got U.S. Patent No. 4,229,761 for her illusion transmitter invention. The device uses parabolic mirrors at transmission and reception points to make three-dimensional optical illusions that look suspended in real space. A camera captures a real image made by the first mirror, then transmits video signals to a projector on the receiving end which reconstructs the image on a second parabolic mirror. This makes a three-dimensional effect without needing special glasses or expensive light sources.

== Problem Addressed With Illusion Transmitter ==
Before Thomas’s invention, the three-dimensional image technology had many limitations. It needed expensive laser systems, it could only record static images, and it was costly and complex. Thomas’s invention solved the problem by using standard parabolic mirrors and video transmission technology to get real time 3D image transmission without needing specialized equipment. This solution had practical applications that were impossible before, like surgeons being able to visualize organs in a minimally invasive way and scientists could visualize complex data in three dimensions. The illusion transmitter uses optical principles instead of expensive and complex technology which addressed these challenges.

== Where Is This Technology Today? ==
NASA still uses the illusion transmitter technology for satellite data visualization and space science applications. This technology also has found uses in the medical and surgical field through visualization systems. It allows surgeons to visualize internal anatomy in 3D during laparoscopic and endoscopic procedures which improves surgical precision. Thomas’s optical principles are also used in 3D display technologies like virtual reality systems. Modern implementations are digital cameras and projectors that can produce high resolution images. Researchers are still finding new applications for these foundational principles and the illusion transmitter technology is still very relevant today.

== Retirement ==
After retiring, Thomas served as an associate at the UMBC Center for Multicore Hybrid Productivity Research. She also continued to mentor youth through the Science Mathematics Aerospace Research and Technology, Inc. and the National Technical Association. In 2018, Thomas was inducted into the National Inventors Hall of Fame, recognizing her contributions to satellite communication and remote sensing as a pioneer.

== Notable achievements ==
Thomas has received numerous awards including the Goddard Space Flight Center Award of Merit and the NASA Equal Opportunity Medal.

== See also ==
- Timeline of women in science
- Mary Jackson (engineer)
- Dorothy Vaughan
- Katherine Johnson
- Claudia Alexander
- Doris Cohen
- Lynnae Quick
