= Illusion transmitter =

Optical device

An illusion transmitter uses two parabolic mirrors to transmit 3-D illusions of an object by use of a camera trained on the first mirror, which then sends video signals to a projector aimed at the second mirror. It was invented by Valerie Thomas; she received a patent in 1980. She developed it for the purpose of sending three-dimensional images across a distance, making them look as if they are in front of the mirror. As of 2022, the technology is still used by NASA and is being adapted for use in surgery, as well as for televisions and video screens.
