= Earl G. Graves Jr. =

American basketball player and businessman

Personal information
- Born: January 5, 1962 (age 61) Brooklyn, New York, U.S.
- Listed height: 6 ft 3 in (1.91 m)
- Listed weight: 200 lb (91 kg)

Career information
- High school: Scarsdale (Scarsdale, New York)
- College: Yale (1980–1984)
- NBA draft: 1984: 3rd round, 68th overall pick
- Drafted by: Philadelphia 76ers
- Position: Shooting guard

Career history
- 1985: Cleveland Cavaliers

Career highlights
- 2× First-team All-Ivy League (1983, 1984); Second-team All-Ivy League (1982)
- Stats at NBA.com
- Stats at Basketball Reference

Earl Gilbert "Butch" Graves Jr. (born January 5, 1962) is an American businessman and retired basketball player. Born in Brooklyn, New York, he is a Scarsdale High School graduate.

== Background ==
Graves, the son of Barbara Graves, and Black Enterprise founder Earl G. Graves Sr., attended Yale University and earned an MBA from Harvard University. While at Yale he was a member of Skull and Bones and captained the college basketball team. He currently is the all-time leading scorer in Yale men's basketball history and third all-time in Ivy League. He was drafted into the NBA by the Philadelphia 76ers and later played briefly for the Cleveland Cavaliers (1984–85). He was also drafted by the Dallas Cowboys.

Graves has worked for Morgan Stanley, as president and CEO of Earl G. Graves Publishing Company, publisher of Black Enterprise magazine, and director of AutoZone, Inc.

In 1995, Graves was detained and searched by two New York Metro-North Police looking for a suspect who did not resemble Graves in any way except race. The police department publicly apologized and Metro-North Railroad purchased ads featuring a printed apology in three New York newspapers, including The New York Times.

On July 22, 2009, Graves stated to the media that "there's nothing post-racial about U.S.", as he responded to the arrest of Harvard professor Henry Louis Gates. In February 2021, Graves said that the biggest challenge for African-American entrepreneurs is scale, and that 96 percent of Black-owned businesses are sole-proprietorships. "We need to take our respective resources [among multiple founders and investors] and work together to build companies that can attract major customers. Microbusinesses can’t do that on their own."

== Career statistics ==
Legend
GP	Games played	GS	Games started	MPG	Minutes per game
FG%	Field goal percentage	3P%	3-point field goal percentage	FT%	Free throw percentage
RPG	Rebounds per game	APG	Assists per game	SPG	Steals per game
BPG	Blocks per game	PPG	Points per game	**Bold**	Career high

=== NBA ===
==== Regular season ====
Year	Team	GP	GS	MPG	FG%	3P%	FT%	RPG	APG	SPG	BPG	PPG
1984–85	Cleveland	4	0	2.8	.333	.000	.200	.5	.3	.3	.0	1.3
