= Ticket quota =

Number of citations a police officer must issue

Ticket quotas are commonly defined as any establishment of a predetermined or specified number of traffic citations an officer must issue in a specified time. Some police departments may set "productivity goals" but deny specific quotas. In many places, such as North Carolina, California, Texas, and Florida, traffic ticket quotas are specifically prohibited by law or illegal.

== United States ==
One common way of preventing traffic ticket quotas includes statutorily regulating the distribution of ticket fine revenue, to prevent it going straight back to the law enforcement agency which issued the tickets; thus eliminating any direct monetary incentive to issue tickets.

=== North Carolina ===
North Carolina law, prohibits ticket quotas only for the State Highway Patrol. In 2002, the Fourth Circuit Court of Appeals ruled that a Division of Motor Vehicles quota system could be followed by officers "without breaking the law".

=== Florida ===
Florida law distributes traffic ticket fine monies by small percentages or amounts to several separate funds preventing it from going back to the agency which issued the ticket. Some of these different funds include the overall governmental entities' general revenue fund, Child Welfare Training Trust Fund, Juvenile Justice Training Trust Fund, Brain and Spinal Cord Injury Trust Fund, Indigent Criminal Defense Trust Fund, Emergency Medical Services Trust Fund, Law Enforcement Radio System Trust Fund, Vocational Rehabilitation of the Department of Education, Division of Blind Services, Epilepsy Services Trust Fund, and Nongame Wildlife Trust Fund.

=== Use by NYPD ===
Officially, the New York City Police Department (NYPD) denies using quotas in policing. In 2015, NYPD Commissioner William Bratton stated: "There are no quotas, if you will." However, some officers dispute this, and describe being put under pressure to meet a specific number of tickets/arrests per month. According to former officer Adhyl Polanco, NYPD officers are expected to bring in "20 and one" per month, referring to 20 tickets and 1 arrest.

Al O'Leary, a spokesman for the Patrolmen's Benevolent Association in Brooklyn, New York says: "Such quotas put the cops under pressure to write summonses when the violations don't exist ... It takes discretion away from the police officer".

== Netherlands ==
The national quota system for issuing tickets was previously scrapped from police performance contracts, but individual forces may still impose their own quota system. In 2009 Guusje ter Horst told Members of the States General of the Netherlands (parliament) that the justice ministry had agreed that the police should raise €831m through fines.

== See also ==
- Highway Traffic Act
