= Earl G. Graves Sr. =

American businessman (1935–2020)

Earl Gilbert Graves Sr.
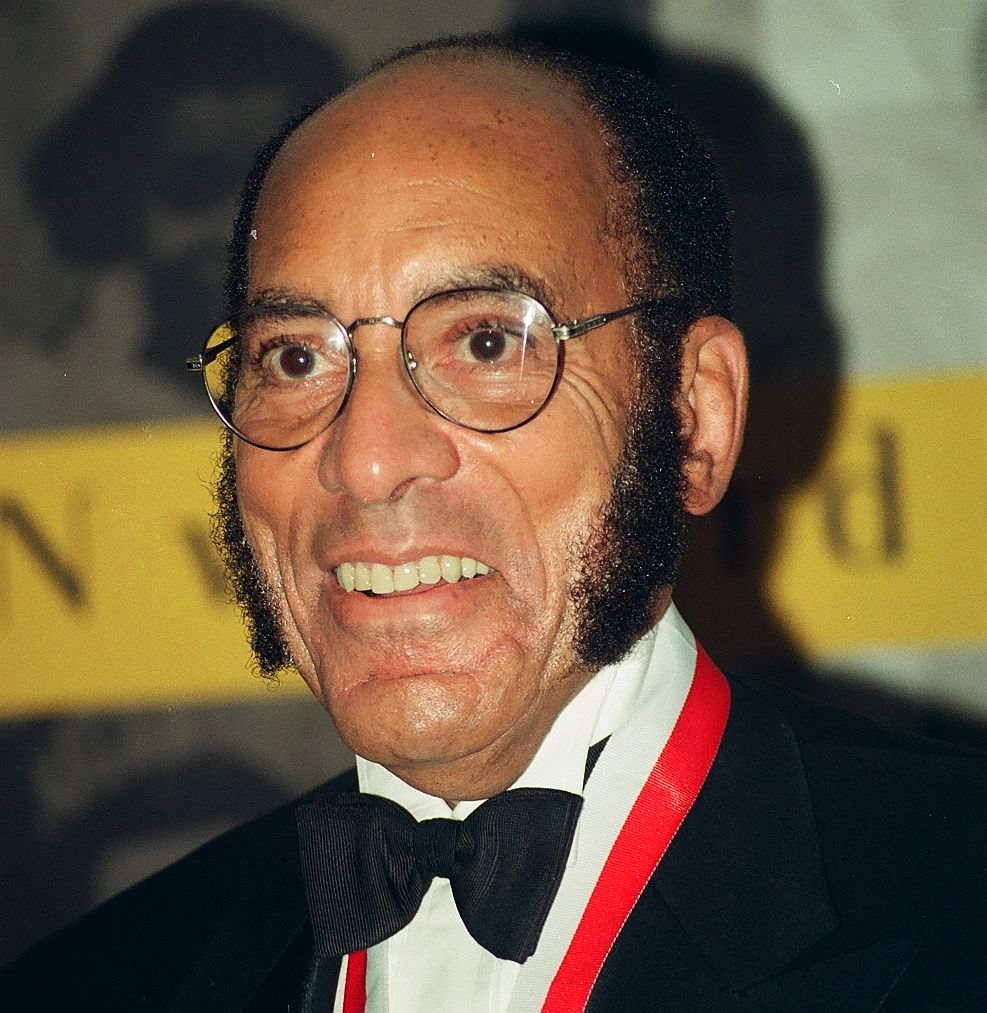
- Graves in 2004
- Born: Earl Gilbert Graves; January 9, 1935; Brooklyn, New York City, U.S.
- Died: April 6, 2020 (aged 85); White Plains, New York, U.S.
- Education: Morgan State University
- Occupations: Entrepreneur; publisher; businessman; philanthropist; advocate
- Known for: Founder of Black Enterprise magazine
- Spouse: Barbara
- Children: 3, including Earl G. Graves Jr.

Earl Gilbert Graves Sr. (January 9, 1935 – April 6, 2020) was an American entrepreneur, publisher, businessman, philanthropist, and advocate of African-American businesses. A graduate of Morgan State University, he was the founder of Black Enterprise magazine and chairman of the media company Earl G. Graves, Ltd. He was the director for Aetna and Executive Board member of the Boy Scouts of America. He was the father of Earl G. Graves Jr.

== Background ==
Born in Brooklyn, New York, to Earl Graves, an immigrant from Barbados, and Winifred (Sealy) Graves, who was from Trinidad. Graves grew up in the Bedford-Stuyvesant section of New York City. A member of Omega Psi Phi fraternity, he received a Bachelor of Arts degree in economics in 1958 from Morgan State University. He was an ROTC graduate and attended Airborne and Ranger Schools.

Having written a letter to the Democratic National Committee, he became a volunteer for the 1964 presidential campaign of Lyndon B. Johnson. His work with the party gave Graves the opportunity to be administrative assistant to newly elected Senator Robert F. Kennedy in 1965. Following the assassination of the senator, Graves would land a seat on the advisory board of the Small Business Administration (SBA) in 1968.

== Business ventures ==
He undertook his first job at the age of seven selling boxed Christmas cards for his uncle. His territory was severely limited due to his father's rule that he could only sell to people living on their side of the block.

While at Morgan State University, Graves made a name for himself as an entrepreneur. Realizing that there was a big market for flowers during Homecoming Week, he went to two competing local florists and cut deals with both to sell flowers on campus. For a percentage of the profits, the florists provided the flowers while Graves covered the campus.

His time on the SBA's advisory board and his direct work with the agency would lead Graves to his belief in the need for advice to businesses in economic development and urban affairs, which convinced him to create an annual newsletter that would chronicle issues relevant to black business people, and raise awareness of the importance of black consumer power. At the suggestion of then SBA Director Howard J. Samuels, Graves would expand the concept of a newsletter into a full-fledged magazine.

Graves started Earl G. Graves, Ltd, and under that holding company he began the Earl G. Graves Associates management consulting firm. In August 1970, the first issue of Black Enterprise magazine hit newsstands. Earl G. Graves, Ltd, grew to include a number of divisions, including publishing, marketing, radio, television and event coordinating arms. The firm is the co-owner of the private equity fund Black Enterprise Greenwich Street Corporate Growth Fund, an equity partnership formed with Travelers Group, Inc. The fund aims to invest and promote minority operated businesses.

In 1990, Graves and Magic Johnson purchased the Pepsi Cola bottling franchise in Washington D.C., and Graves was CEO until 1998, when he sold his ownership to Pepsi. He held board and director memberships with a number of other corporations, including AMR Corporation, Daimler AG, Federated Department Stores and Rohm and Haas, as well as board member of the American Museum of Natural History and Hayden Planetarium in New York City. He was also a member of the Board of Trustees of Howard University.

== Awards and other accomplishments ==
Graves received the Silver Buffalo Award from the Boy Scouts of America in 1988, and was the National Commissioner from 1985 to 1994. He received the NAACP's Spingarn Medal in 1999. In 2002, Graves was named as one of the 50 most powerful and influential African Americans in corporate America by Fortune magazine.

Graves was appointed by the administration of George W. Bush to be on the Presidential Commission for the National Museum of African American History and Culture. On April 26, 2007, Earl G. Graves Sr. was inducted into the Junior Achievement U.S. Business Hall of Fame. In 2009, he became the recipient of the 2009 NCAA Silver Anniversary Award.

In his honor, Morgan State University's business school was named Earl G. Graves School of Business and Management. It was opened in 2015.

A "special thanks" to Mr. Graves is included in Bayer Mack's 2019 documentary No Lye: An American Beauty Story.

== Death ==
Graves died in White Plains, New York, on April 6, 2020, from complications of Alzheimer's disease at the age of 85.
