= Evelyn Brooks Higginbotham =

American professor (born 1945)

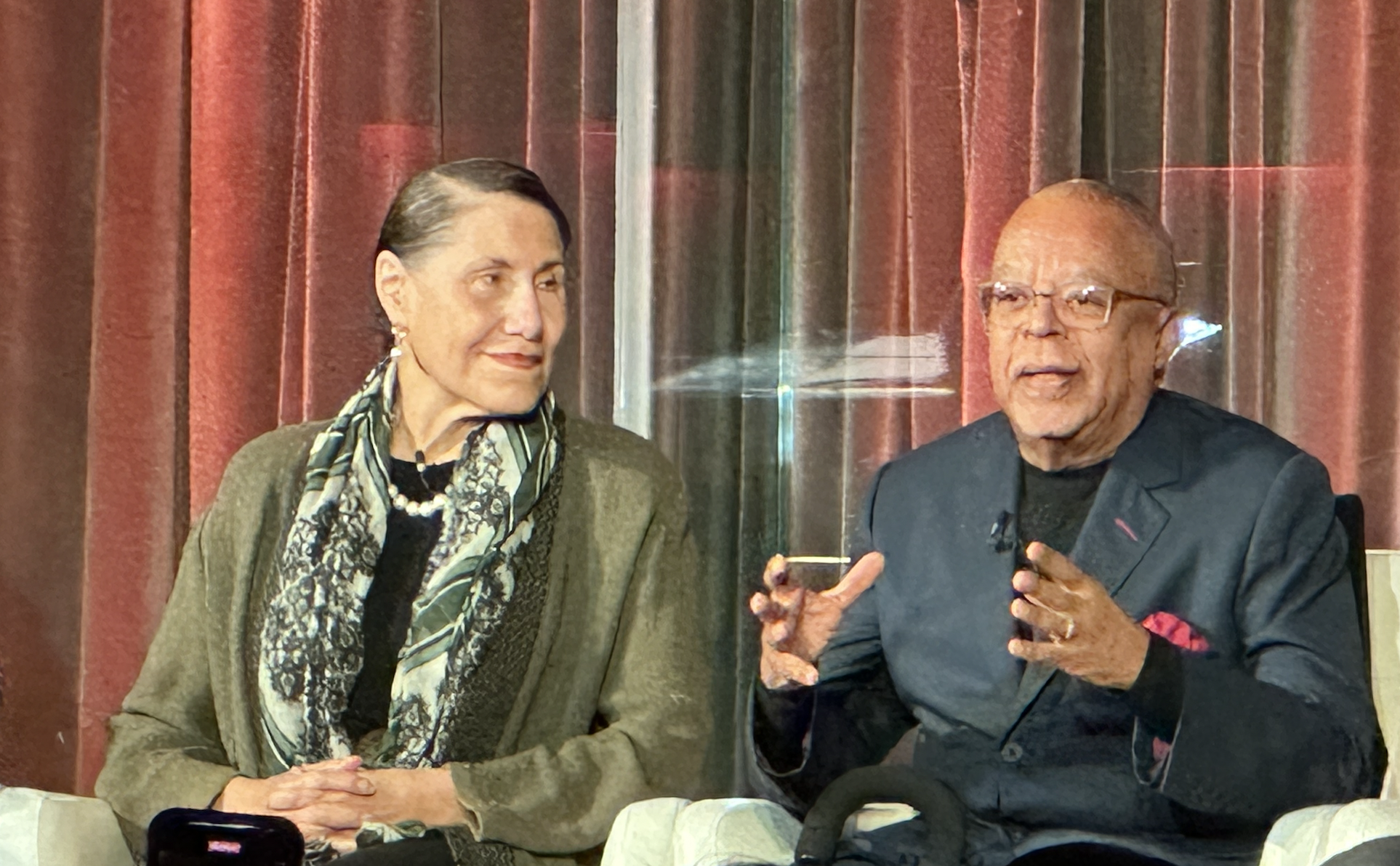
- Higginbotham with Henry Louis Gates Jr.
- Born: 1945 (age 80–81); Washington, District of Columbia, United States
- Education: University of Wisconsin; Howard University; University of Rochester
- Occupation: African American History Professor
- Notable work: Righteous Discontent: The Women's Movement in the Black Baptist Church: 1880–1920
- Spouse: A. Leon Higginbotham (d. 1998)
- Awards: National Humanities Medal

Evelyn Brooks Higginbotham (born 1945) is an American academic who is professor of Afro-American Studies, African American Religion and the Victor S. Thomas Professor of History and African American Studies at Harvard University. Higginbotham wrote Righteous Discontent: The Women's Movement in the Black Baptist Church: 1880–1920, which won several awards. She has also received several awards for her work, most notably the 2014 National Humanities Medal.

== Early life and education ==
Evelyn Brooks Higginbotham was born in Washington, DC, United States, in 1945 to Albert Neal Dow Brooks and his wife Alma Elaine Campbell. Higginbotham's father served as secretary treasurer for the Association for the Study of Afro-American Life and History as well as edited the organization's Negro History Bulletin. Her mother, Alma Elaine Campbell, a high-school history teacher, later became the supervisor for history in the Washington, D.C. public school system.

Higginbotham often accompanied her father to his work, which allowed her to encounter and become familiar with many significant early African-American historians, including Rayford Logan, Charles H. Wesley and Benjamin Quarles. Higginbotham later related how this unique experience shaped her later career choice, "I knew from childhood that I wanted to teach, research, and write about the history of African Americans." Stories her father told her of family members also inspired her. Her great-grandfather, Albert Royal Brooks, was born into slavery in Virginia in 1817, and after the American Civil War then began to serve on the jury to try former Confederate president Jefferson Davis. Higginbotham's great-grandmother, Lucy Goode Brooks, created one of the first, post-Civil War orphanages serving black children. It was then called the Friends Asylum for Colored Orphans. It still operates as FRIENDS Association for Children, a preschool/after school care center. Her grandfather, Walter Henderson Brooks, was a pastor at Nineteenth Street Baptist Church (Washington, D.C.), the oldest black Baptist congregation in Washington D.C. Higginbotham's aunt, Julia Evangeline Brooks, was one of the incorporators of Alpha Kappa Alpha, the first African-American sorority.

"In many ways," Higginbotham says, "the family stories inspired me to pursue the discipline of history and gave me an appreciation of the importance of individual lives, broadly speaking, as a lens or mirror to much larger social and political contexts."

In 1969, Higginbotham received her B.A. history degree from the University of Wisconsin, then in 1974 went on to receive her M.A. history degree from Howard University. In 1975, she earned a certification in Archival Administration and Record Management from the U.S. National Archives. In 1977, she earned a certification in quantitative methodology in Social Science from the Newberry Library in Chicago. In 1984, she received her Ph.D. degree in history from the University of Rochester. She also married A. Leon Higginbotham, who died in 1998.

== Career ==
Higginbotham taught American history and counseled students completing the eighth grade at Francis Parkman Jr. High School in Milwaukee, Wisconsin from 1969 to 1971. After she moved to Washington D.C., she taught American history and social studies at Woodrow Wilson High School. From 1974 to 1975, she worked as a manuscript research associate at Moorland-Spingarn Research Center at Howard University. Higginbotham also taught history as a professor at Dartmouth College, the University of Maryland and the University of Pennsylvania.

In 1993, Higginbotham became a professor of Afro-American Studies and African American Religious History at Harvard University, where since 1998 she has been the Victor S. Thomas Professor of History and African American Studies. Higginbotham became the chair of Harvard University's African American Studies department in 2006 and served as acting-director of the W. E. B Du Bois Institute for African American Research in 2008. She was also appointed as the Inaugural John Hope Franklin Professor of American Legal History at Duke University Law School in 2010.

== Publications and work ==
Higginbotham's writing spans a variety of diverse topics that include African-American religious history, women's history, civil rights, constructions of racial and gender identity, electoral politics and the combination and intersection of theory and history.

Higginbotham's most notable piece of work is her book Righteous Discontent: The Women's Movement in the Black Baptist Church: 1880–1920. This book won numerous awards including awards from the American Historical Association, the American Academy of Religion, the Association of Black Women Historians and the Association for Research on Non-Profit and Voluntary Organizations. Righteous Discontent: The Women's Movement in the Black Baptist Church: 1880–1920 was also on the New York Times Book Review's Notable Books of the Year in both 1993 and 1992.

Higginbotham has also revised and updated John Hope Franklin's African-American history survey From Slavery to Freedom, which was originally published in 1947. She has worked with Henry Louis Gates, Jr. as co-editor of the African American National Biography, a 12-volume resource of information that presents African-American history in more than 5,000 biographical entries. Her article "African American Women's History and the Metalanguage of Race" won the best article prize of the Berkshire Conference of Women Historians in 1993 and continues to be one of her most cited and reprinted articles.

In February 2022, Higginbotham was one of 38 Harvard faculty to sign a letter to The Harvard Crimson defending Professor John Comaroff, who had been found to have violated the university's sexual and professional conduct policies. The letter defended Comaroff as "an excellent colleague, advisor and committed university citizen" and expressed dismay over his being sanctioned by the university. After students filed a lawsuit with detailed allegations of Comaroff's actions and the university's failure to respond, Higginbotham was one of several signatories to say that she wished to retract her signature. Higginbotham was involved in the creation of AP African American Studies, a college-level course available to high school students.

== Honors and recognition ==
Higginbotham has won numerous awards throughout the years for her books, publications and research. In 1994, she received the Scholar's Medal of the University of Rochester. In 2000, she was awarded the YWCA of Boston's Women of Achievement Award. In 2003, Harvard University chose Higginbotham to be a Walter Channing Fellow in recognition of her achievements in history. In March 2005, Higginbotham was included in AOL Black Voice's "Top 10 Black Women in Higher Education." Higginbotham received several awards in 2008. In April 2008, she was honored by Unity First for preserving African-American History. In August 2008, she was awarded the Legend Award by Urban League and in October 2008 she was awarded the Carter G. Woodson Scholars Medallion by the Association for the Study of African American Life and History.

In 2010, Higginbotham was inducted into the American Philosophical Society for promoting useful knowledge. She was awarded an Honorary Doctorate of Humane Letters degree from Howard University in 2011. In 2012, she was honored with the Living Legacy award by the Association for the Study of African American Life and History (ASAALH) and was also awarded the Joan Kelly Memorial Prize in Women's History from the American Historical Association and the Letitia Woods Brown Memorial Award from the Association of Black Women Historians.

In May 2012, Higginbotham received the Star Family Prize for Excellence in Advising for her guidance and mentorship of a Harvard undergraduate. Heidelberg University awarded her the James W.C. Pennington Award in July 2013 for her contributions to African American Religious History. She received an Honorary Doctorate from the University of Wisconsin-Milwaukee in 2014. During the academic year 2013–14, she was the John Hope Franklin Fellow at the National Humanities Venter in Research Triangle Park, North Carolina. In March 2015, Higginbotham was named one of the "Top 25 Women in Higher Education" by Diverse Magazine.

The most notable award Higginbotham has received was the 2014 National Humanities Medal, which was presented to her by President Barack Obama at the White House for "illuminating the African American journey."
