= John O. Spencer =

University administrator (1857–1947)

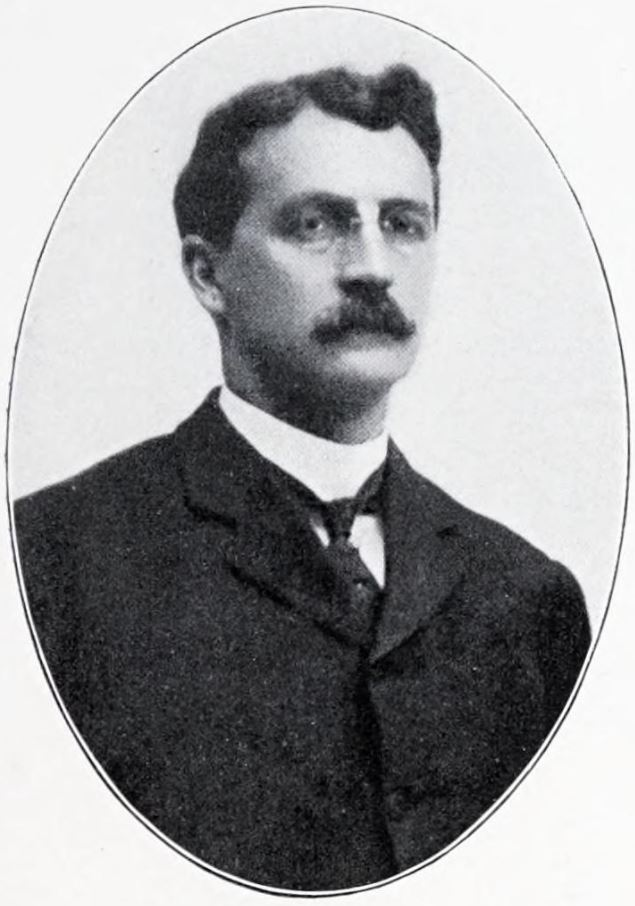
- John O. Spencer, c. 1910

4th President of Morgan College
- In office 1902–1937
- Preceded by: Francis J. Wagner
- Succeeded by: Dwight O. W. Holmes

Personal details
- Born: John Oakley Spencer; July 11, 1857 Lynn, Pennsylvania
- Died: May 24, 1947 (aged 89) Baltimore, Maryland
- Education: Illinois Wesleyan University; Columbia University; Oxford University
- Profession: University president

John Oakley Spencer, Ph.D., LL.D. (July 11, 1857 – May 24, 1947) was an ordained minister and college administrator who served as the fourth president of Morgan College from 1902 to 1937. Spencer's presidency is considered to be a renaissance period and the first "Era of Progress" for Morgan, in which the campus underwent major transformations. The other "Era's of Progress" were under the presidency of Martin D. Jenkins, Ph.D. (1948–1970) and during the presidency of Earl S. Richardson (1984–2010).

== Biography ==
Spencer was born on July 11, 1857, in Lynn, Susquehanna County, Pennsylvania. He was educated at Keystone Academy in Factoryville, Pennsylvania. Afterwards, he attended Illinois Wesleyan University in Bloomington, Illinois, followed by Columbia University and Oxford University. Spencer was an ordained minister and member of the Baltimore Conference, Methodist Episcopal Church.

Spencer became president of Morgan College in 1902, and served in that position until 1937. During his tenure as president, the university saw major expansions across the campus. It also saw the first "Era of Progress" as the college transformed from a college supported by the religious community (which focused primarily upon training young men and women for the ministry) to a college gaining support from private foundations, and offering liberal arts degrees for a variety of professions. Also during this period, Morgan College received its first accreditation by the Middle States Association of Colleges and Schools.
