= Tony Fulton (Maryland politician) =

American politician

Member of the Maryland House of Delegates from the 40th district
- In office January 14, 1987 – May 5, 2005
- Preceded by: Mary B. Adams
- Succeeded by: Catherine Pugh
- Constituency: Baltimore City

Personal details
- Born: Tony Edward Fulton; December 9, 1951 Baltimore, Maryland, U.S.
- Died: May 20, 2005 (aged 53) Baltimore, Maryland, U.S.
- Party: Democratic
- Spouse: Jacqueline Carter-Fulton
- Children: 2
- Education: Morgan State University (BA); University of Maryland, College Park (MA)
- Occupation: Realtor

Tony Edward Fulton (December 9, 1951 – May 20, 2005) was an American politician who served in the Maryland House of Delegates, representing the 40th legislative district, which lies in the central, northwest section of Baltimore.

== Background ==
Fulton, the son of George Edward and Helen Darling Fulton, was born in Baltimore on December 9, 1951 where he grew up and was a member of the Holy Trinity Episcopal Church. Later was a member of New Psalmist Baptist Church until the time of his death. He graduated from the Baltimore City College in 1969 where he played lacrosse. In 1973, he received his B.A. in political science from Morgan State College where he also played on the legendary Ten Bears lacrosse team. He earned an M.A. in public administration from the University of Maryland in 1975. He was married to the former Jacqueline Carter for 29 years, the couple had two children; Fulton died of cancer, May 20, 2005.

== In the Legislature ==
After an unsuccessful try, Fulton was elected to the Maryland House of Delegates in 1986 with his term starting January 14, 1987. He was a member of the Environmental Matters Committee from 1987 to 1992, from 1995 to 1996 and from 2004 until his death. He served on the environment, the housing & real property and the natural resources & ethics subcommittees in 2005. Fulton was a member of the Judiciary Committee in 1993, the Commerce and Government Matters Committee in 1994 and the Economic Matters Committee from 1996 to 2004. While on the Economic Matters committee he was a member of its science & technology, worker's compensation subcommittee, 1999–2004, corporations work group, deathcare industry work group, electric universal service program work group and chaired the unemployment insurance subcommittee from 2003 to 2004.

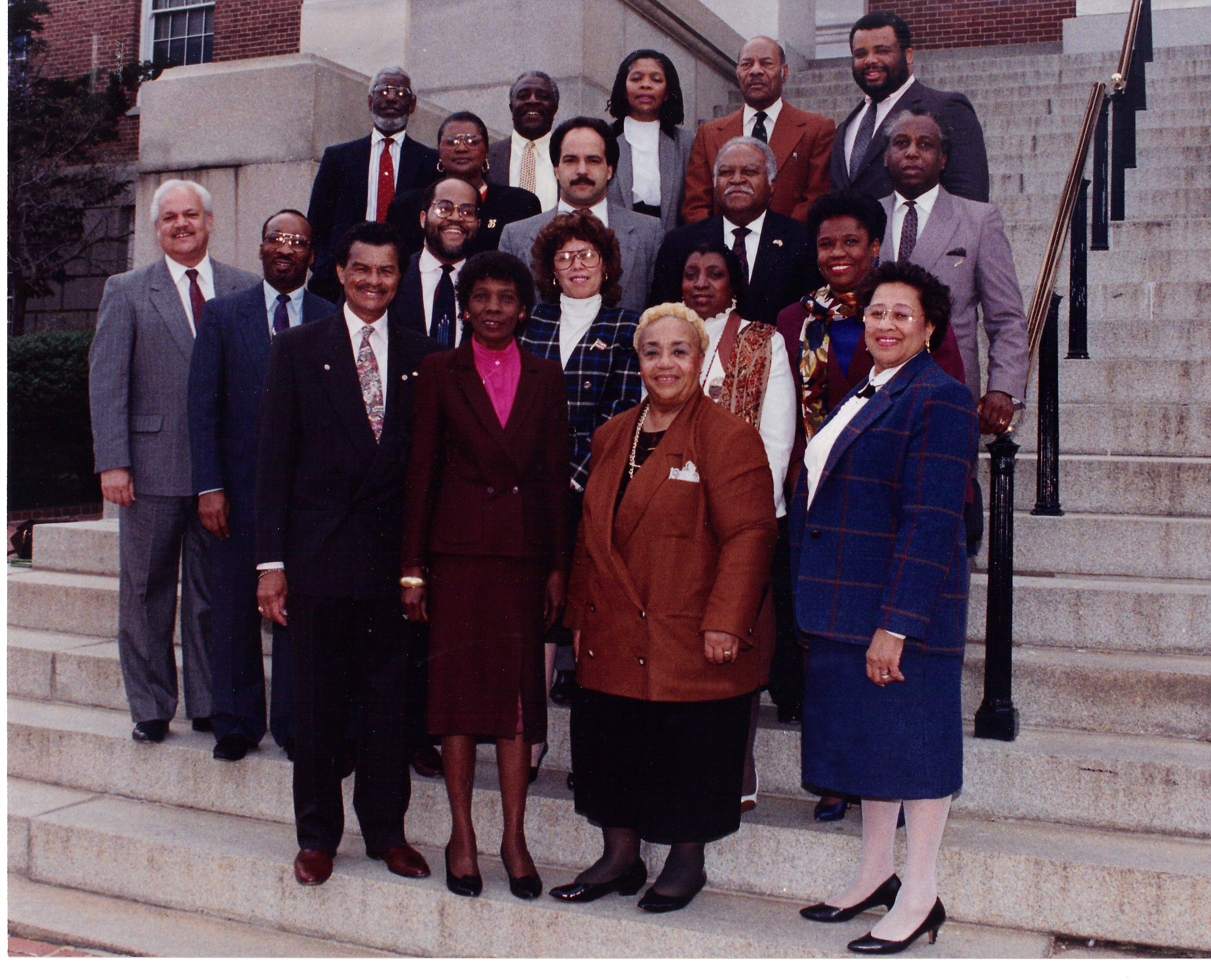
Fulton with the 1992 Legislative Black Caucus of Maryland

Fulton also served as the House Chairman of the Special Joint Committee on Group Homes from 1995 to 1997 and was a deputy majority whip from 1995 to 1998. During his entire tenure he was a member of the Legislative Black Caucus of Maryland and a member of the National Conference of State Legislatures.
