= Michael Spencer (disambiguation) =

Michael Spencer (born 1955) is a British billionaire businessman and philanthropist.

Michael or Mike Spencer may also refer to:

- Michael Spencer (producer), Canadian film producer
- Michael G. Spencer, computer scientist, electrical engineer, and professor at Morgan State University
- Mike Spencer, English record producer and recording engineer
- Mike Spencer, one of the characters in True Blood
- Michael Shane Spencer (born 1972), Major League Baseball outfielder
