= Black-American anthropology =

Black-American anthropology is a field within anthropology that focuses on the study of Black-American culture and ethnogenesis within the United States. This field encompasses various sub-disciplines, including cultural, physical, and linguistic anthropology.

== History and ethnogenesis ==
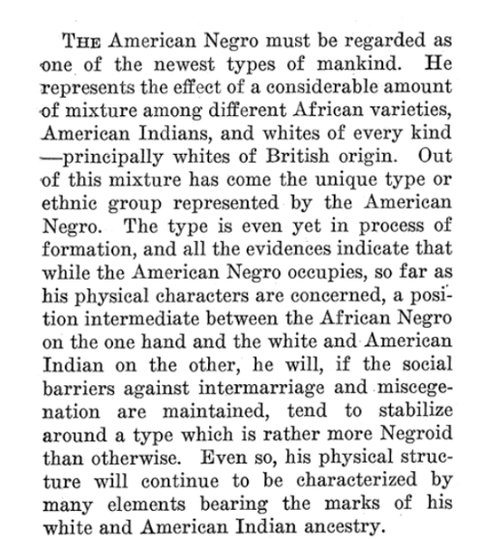
Early 20th century anthropological description of Black-American ethnogenesis

Contact between Native Americans and [Africans] is as old as the contact between Native Americans and Europeans, because the first Europeans entering the Americas brought Africans and (Atlantic) Creoles of Color with them, free or bonded, as sailors, seamen, workers, indentured servants, and slaves.

— Bartel Renate, American Tri-Racials African-Native Contact, Multi-Ethnic Native American Nations, and the Ethnogenesis of Tri-Racial Groups in North America,

Europeans, Africans, and Native Americans usually communicated in Pidgin English or French, which they might have used for communication in Europe and Africa already. The first mentioning of Pidgin English among American Indians dates from 1641 in Massachusetts. T hey also used trade languages like Mobilian Jargon, a pidgin language based on the Choctaw and Chickasaw language, and African Americans and Europeans learned Native American languages fast

— Bartel Renate, American Tri-Racials African-Native Contact, Multi-Ethnic Native American Nations, and the Ethnogenesis of Tri-Racial Groups in North America,

Though there is some scholarly debate regarding the mechanism of collective enslavement as a point of contact between Africans and Native-Americans in colonial America, it nevertheless is the prevailing explanation for the Native American ancestry of Black-Americans.

There are several publications that adhere to the aforementioned slave lore and the theory claiming that the reason for the intermixture of Native Americans with African Americans was their collective enslavement, working side by side as slaves. Some authors even claimed that American Indian slaves were absorbed by African American society: They [American Indian slaves] were thrown closely with the negroes, and the fact that they eventually disappeared indicated that they intermarried with, and were absorbed by, the large body of blacks.

— Bartel Renate, American Tri-Racials African-Native Contact, Multi-Ethnic Native American Nations, and the Ethnogenesis of Tri-Racial Groups in North America,

Per DNA evidence, Black-Americans are descendants of Native-Americans who encountered enslaved African people via plantations, or refuge, and intermixed with Europeans sometime prior to the Civil War. Using tract lengths, a 2015 23andMe related study "[estimated] that initial admixture between Europeans and Native Americans occurred twelve generations ago, followed by subsequent African admixture six generations ago, consistent with other admixture inference methods dating African American admixture.

However, there is evidence to suggest admixture between Native-Americans and Africans occurred prior to European admixture, as seen with individuals buried in Catocin Furnace cemetery.

At the population level, the Catoctin individuals have diverse ancestry, with clear genetic links to Africa, Europe, and the Americas. Most individuals have primarily sub-Saharan African ancestry, with the strongest ties to present-day peoples in Senegambia and West Central Africa, a region that primarily encompasses present-day Angola and the DRC. These findings accord with historical records that show that slave ships originating from Senegambia (particularly before the end of the 18th century) and West Central Africa accounted for the highest disembarkation rates in Maryland over the course of the transatlantic slave trade

— Éadaoin Harney, Steven Micheletti, et al, The Genetic Legacy of African Americans from Catoctin Furnace,

Over one quarter of individuals (n=7) could be modeled as having no detectable European admixture (i.e., the amount of ancestry assigned to the European source population is within a single standard error of zero). This is in sharp contrast to nearly all present-day self-identifying African Americans who typically have at least some European-derived ancestry (e.g., there is an average of 24% European ancestry among 23andMe research participants who self-identify as African American (39)).

— Éadaoin Harney, Steven Micheletti, et al, The Genetic Legacy of African Americans from Catoctin Furnace,

The researchers write it is uncertain if the individuals at Catoctin Furnace had Native American ancestry.

African-Americans, who were sampled in 2010, were found to be 73.2% African, in addition to being found to have 24.0% European and 0.8% Native ancestry. The researchers comment the study indicates a lower African admixture than previous ones. They state their dataset has higher representation of African-Americans in New York and California, who have lower rates of African ancestry on average, and that sociocultural and economic factors may have influenced who purchased 23andme tests, as the testing is not free, and requires internet access.

== Cultural anthropology ==
[T]he [Black]-American community is [not] held together by "white oppression and racism." There is strong evidence to support [the] view that the [Black]-American people have reasons of their own to cling together, quite apart from external oppression. For example, the [B]lack church does not exist simply because the white church is oppressive. Black religion is a qualitatively different experience altogether and exists parallel with but not subservient to white religion. The [B]lack fraternal organizations might have been necessary because of exclusion from white organizations, but their persistence and growth are driven by forces internal to the [B]lack experience as much as by external hostility.

— Andrew Billingsley, Climbing Jacob's Ladder: The Enduring Legacies of African-American Families,

Finally, it is appropriate to speak of [a] [Black]-American community in terms of a set of institutions and organizations which grow out of the [Black]-American heritage, identify with it, and serve primarily [Black]-American people and families. The repeated assertion that the black community is not organized misses the mark. Organization is widespread. There is an organization, agency, or institution for every conceivable function in the [B]lack community today. They are, however, sometimes small and uncoordinated, and uncooperative with others. And they sometimes spring up and dissolve too soon to complete their missions. But they anchor the community and can be galvanized into collective action when circumstances or leadership commands.

— Andrew Billingsley, Climbing Jacob's Ladder: The Enduring Legacies of African-American Families,

Fully 70 percent of [B]lack adults belong to just one, namely the [B]lack church, which is easily the strongest and most representative. The[B]lack church embodies all the four senses of community. Ordinarily located in neighborhoods where a majority of the families are of [Black]-American descent, it embraces traditional [Black]-American values. It identifies with both the struggles and achievements of [Black]-American people, and it is institutionalized with an enduring organizational structure and mission.

— Andrew Billingsley, Climbing Jacob's Ladder: The Enduring Legacies of African-American Families',

While social justice is a Black-American cultural pillar, social justice movements and institutions particularly in the post civil rights era have often been criticized as "very male-centered" with "[solutions] which further marginalise [sic]…Black women" as a "masculinised [sic] vision of Black empowerment and liberation resonates [throughout the community]".

Patriarchy is also evidenced in the family structure, as "by the early 1970s …abundant research [had demonstrated] that the [Black]-American family was not a tangle of pathologies of black matriarchies. Rather…[since the time of slavery Black-Americans] had created viable, productive, resilient families that … were mostly nuclear, male-headed households".

However, a notable caveat differentiating the Black-American household from their European and other immigrant counterparts is the extended family. "Extended family members constitute an important source of support for [Black-Americans] (Lincoln, Taylor, & Chatters, 2012). [Black-Americans] generally rely more heavily on kin than nonkin for support (Taylo Hernandez, Nicklett, Taylor, & Chatters, 2014) and are more likely than Whites to both provide and receive instrumental assistance such as help with household chores, transportation, and running errands (Gerstel, 2011). Although some argue that African Americans' greater social involvement in the extended family network is more a function of class, with poorer people more heavily involved in their family networks as a result of need (Gerstel, 2011), O'Brien (2012) found that both middle- and upper-income African Americans were more likely to be involved in their family networks in terms of providing financial assistance than were Whites. With respect to family structure, African Americans are more likely than Whites to reside in extended family households, which are beneficial living arrangements because they allow for family members to pool economic and social resources and distribute household and caregiving responsibilities (Taylor, Chatters, Tucker, & Lewis, 1990)."

It is also important to note that education is highly valued in Black-American culture. "Contrary to what "acting white" advocates say, Black youth have positive attitudes about education. In his analysis of data on student attitudes, Dr. Toldson found that Black males were the most likely to consider high-achieving students "cool." Moreover, 95 percent of Black girls said that they would be proud to tell their friends about their academic achievements – the highest percentage of any group. Black girls were the least likely to avoid telling friends about academic triumphs; white males were the most likely to do so. Finally, Black females were twice as likely as white males to report that their friends would support their choice to study even if it meant delaying plans to have fun."

== Physical anthropology ==
Physical anthropology is the study of the biological features of ancient and modern humans, including health, nutrition, mortality, genetics and physical variability in the past and present, and of humans' primate relatives and fossil ancestors. These studies are all informed by modern evolutionary theory and take their place in anthropology rather than biology because they consider the biocultural context within which human evolution, adaptation and variation occur. Historically, however, physical anthropology focused on the physical variation observed among living peoples and assumed that a fixed number of definitive physical "types" lay behind this variation. These fundamental types were identified as the different "races" of humankind and were thought to be recognizable also in the fossil or skeletal record.

— Kathryn A. Bard, Encyclopedia of the Archaeology of Ancient Egypt,

Contemporary physical anthropologists recognize, however, that race is not a useful biological concept when applied to humans. Although many people believe that they can distinguish "races" on the basis of skin color, more of the variation in human genetic makeup can be attributed to differences within these so-called races than between them. Furthermore, the observable and unobservable (to the eye) physical variation is so great and complex that there are no criteria that can satisfactorily segregate all individuals into one race or another. The movement in historic times of genes throughout different populations of the world and the sharing of genes through interbreeding ensures that different populations around the world are becoming more alike. Unlike the classic typological approach, which interprets variation in physical form as resulting only from the admixture of races, contemporary approaches to understanding variation also take into account genetic and physiological adaptations to local and regional environmental factors, such as the intensity of ultraviolet radiation or ambient temperature and humidity. Conceptually, biological affinity expresses a continuum of relationship that reflects genetic mixing (gene flow) from different local and regional areas in antiquity in addition to the influences of other evolutionary factors, such as natural selection and genetic drift.

— Kathryn A. Bard, Encyclopedia of the Archaeology of Ancient Egypt,

Due to shared ancestry and their ethnogenesis within the land that would become the United States, Black-Americans exhibit morphological traits consistent with their founding populations.

The formation of a unique Black-American ethnicity was noted by anthropologists in the early 20th century, "[t]hey noticed a "transformation" in the American Black population that Melville J. Herskovits (1928) termed "racial crossing." They began to publish, from an anthropological view, articles and books to help American Blacks understand their biological origins and culture. Herskovits did much to understand what he termed the "American Negro" and tried to help all Americans in the early 20th century understand that American Blacks were a significant portion of the population and that they have adapted to this environment both culturally and biologically, and are therefore American."

Since the early 18th century, Black-Americans have remained morphologically distinct, yet somewhat intermediate between Europeans and Africans. A University of Tennessee study, found that "West African groups are more similar to one another than any other groups are to each other. The class means of the canonical variables were plotted and represent 64% of the among-group variation, Figure 6. The between canonical structure (Table 9) indicates that on the first canonical axis West Africans display more facial prognathism, wider nasal apertures, longer malars, and wider mid-facial breadth. Early American Whites display longer and wider vaults, wide biauricular breadth, larger values for cheek height, and larger values for occipital subtense. The second canonical axis is primarily separating groups based on vault height and frontal chord values. The 1600 and 1650 White half-century groups display the lowest vault heights and the 1700 and 1750 White half-century groups display the highest values for vault height. Based on the craniofacial variables used in the present analysis, the early American Black sample is intermediate to the West African and American White samples."

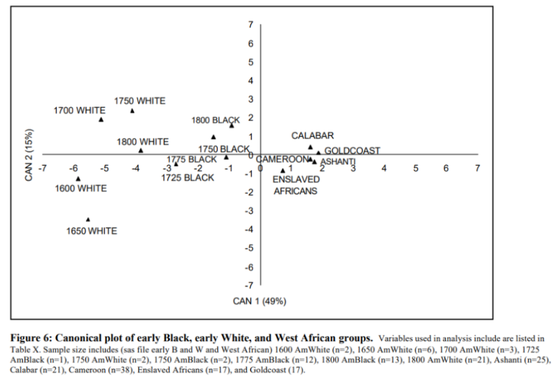
Principal component analysis of Early American Blacks

These findings are consistent with earlier literature:

Pollitizer (1958) found American Blacks morphologically and genetically intermediate between American Whites and West Africans based on quantitative polygenic traits and genetic data. However, Pollitizer's study uses recent American Black and White and West African samples.

— Martha Katherine Spradley, Biological Anthropological Aspects of the African Diaspora; Geographic Origins, Secular Trends, and Plastic Versus Genetic Influences Utilizing Craniometric Data,

Trevor was interested in quantifying phenotypic traits of American Blacks by determining specific traits that were more similar to Africans and traits that were more similar to Europeans. In his analysis, he found three variables in American Blacks that were significantly higher than values for West African and British crania, indicating that American Blacks were not just intermediate, but displayed a unique morphology. These variables include facial height, nasal height, and orbital breadth. As other studies during this time period and earlier, the increased values for the three variables were attributed to admixture.

— Martha Katherine Spradley, Biological Anthropological Aspects of the African Diaspora; Geographic Origins, Secular Trends, and Plastic Versus Genetic Influences Utilizing Craniometric Data,

In Angel's study of colonial to modern skeletal change in both American Blacks and Whites, he attributed an increase in facial height among American Blacks specifically to admixture with American Whites and Native Americans.

— Martha Katherine Spradley, Biological Anthropological Aspects of the African Diaspora; Geographic Origins, Secular Trends, and Plastic Versus Genetic Influences Utilizing Craniometric Data,

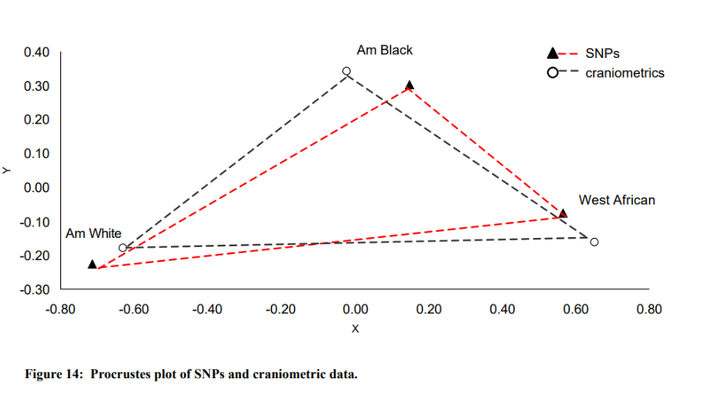
Plot of SNPs versus craniometrics

Per the University of Tennessee study, "[t]he most interesting relationship was found between SNPs and craniometrics, both indicating American Blacks to be intermediate between West Africans and American Whites. If craniofacial morphology was influenced by plasticity more than genetics, then the craniometric data would not "fit" well with the SNPs data. While plasticity does likely affect craniofacial morphology, the fit between the SNPs and craniometric data supports a genetic influence." Accordingly, the intermediacy of Black-Americans is supported both craniofacially and genetically.

These findings are reinforced by a 2021 study published in Forensic Anthropology Volume 4, which found, "the [Black-American] group intermediate to the West and Central Africans and European Americans on the first axis."

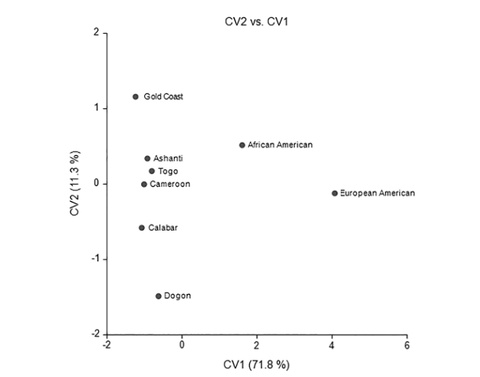
Canonical Variable plot for Black-Americans

The variance of these populations is explained as follows. "Almost all variables contribute to CV1 as indicated by the structure coefficients (see Table 2). The pattern of loadings presents a clear pattern of morphometric variation. High scores on CV1 result from a wide cranial base, long cranial base length and vault height, high nasal height and narrow nasal aperture and interorbital distance. The reverse is the case for low scores on CV1. CV1 reflects a pattern of variation normally associated with African-European variation."

These results are further verified using a discrimination matrix to discern whether these populations could be distinguished craniofacially. "Given the similarities between these two groups and their intermediate or dissimilar positions relative to their ancestral groups, an additional analysis, to highlight and contextualize our results within a forensic anthropological framework, was performed. A discriminant functional analysis (DFA) was performed to assess how well these American groups classify when compared to their ancestral groups. A cross-validated classification matrix is presented in Table 6. These results agree with the intermediate position of African American presented in our CV plot."

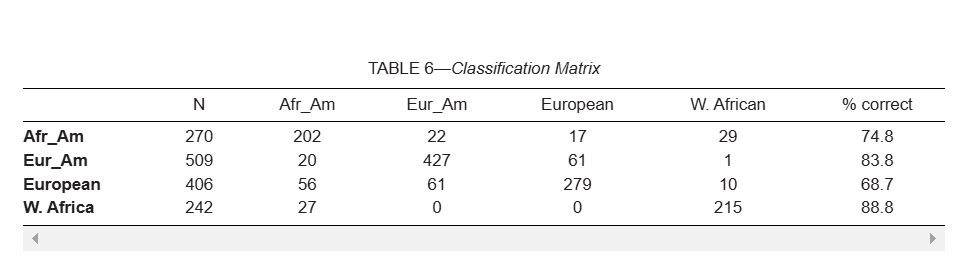
Craniofacial metrics utilized via a discrimination matrix to differentiate populations

The results of the discrimination analysis showed that while 39 Black-Americans were misclassified as 'European' or 'European-American', just 29 fell into the 'African' category, while approximately 75% of Black-Americans were correctly discriminated, confirming that "the ability to predict group membership can be referred to as affinity", and solidifying craniofacial Black-American affinity overall.

Furthermore, beyond the wider orbital breadths discussed by Trevor, Black-Americans exhibit relatively broad cheekbones which are also a marker of American Indian ancestry.

Ancestral variation in the zygoma reflects genetic variations because of genetic drift as well as natural selection and epigenetic changes to adapt to diet and climate variations with possible intensification by isolation. Prominence of the zygoma, zygomaxillary tuberosity, and malar tubercle have been associated with Eastern Asian populations in whom these features intensified. …Diffusion of these traits occurred across the Behring [sic] Sea to the Arctic areas and to North and South America. The greatest zygomatic projections are exhibited in Arctic groups as an adaptation to extreme cold conditions

— Anna C. Oettlé, Fabrice P. Demeter, Ericka N. l'Abbé, Ancestral Variations in the Shape and Size of the Zygoma,

While both Europeans and Africans at large (with the notable exceptions of Eastern Europeans and Khoisan peoples) exhibit 'retracted' zygomatic bones (cheekbones), the cheekbones of Black-Americans do not exhibit this trait, and are similar to Inuit and Native-American populations in respect to bizygomatic breadth. "Skulls from European ancestry have narrower faces with retracted zygomatic bones…African groups present with retracted zygomatic bones (L'Abbé et al., 2011)...."

Mean bizygomatic distances of males are represented on the map (Fig. 3) and are tabulated according to size in Table 2. Distances ranged from 125.10 mm to 147.50 mm. From the map, population groups from African and European ancestry presented with the smallest measurements. The values rose slightly in Eastern Europe and in the Middle East. The greatest measurements were found, as expected, in Inner Mongolians, Thais, Japanese, and Azerbaijanis. Higher than expected values were found …in North American Blacks (138.70 mm). Although many factors may be responsible for the greater than expected bizygomatic breadths noted in North Americans, the possibility of admixture needs to be considered.

— Anna C. Oettlé, Fabrice P. Demeter, Ericka N. l'Abbé, Ancestral Variations in the Shape and Size of the Zygoma,

More particularly while Sub-Saharan Africans were shown to have an average bizygomatic width of 126.50 mm (4.980 in), Black-Americans' bizygomatic widths were on average 138.70 mm (5.461 in), which is on par with measurements for Inuit.

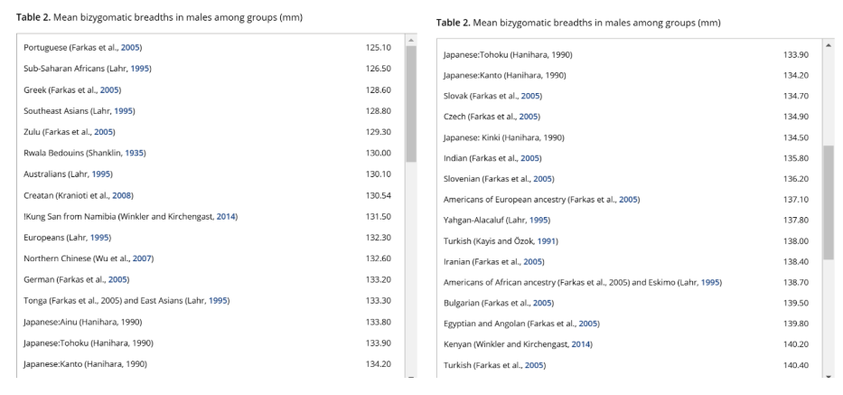
Mean bizygomatic breadths in males among groups (mm)

Post-cranial traits of Black-Americans are also distinct from Europeans and many Africans, and are proximate to Ancient Egyptians and Nubians.

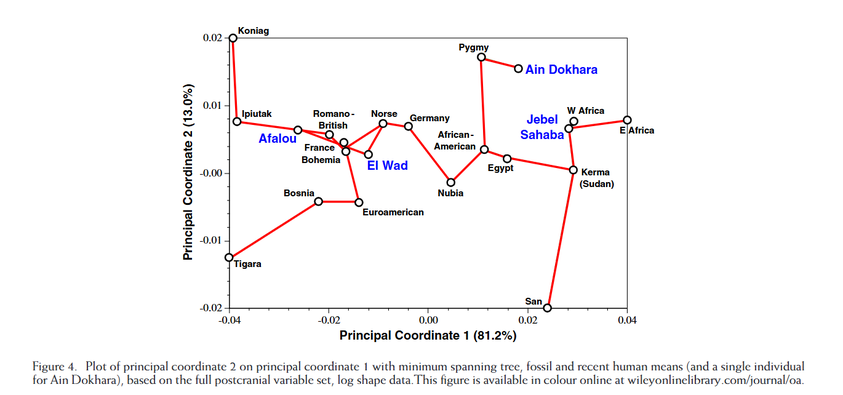
Plot of principal coordinate 2 on principal coordinate 1 with minimum spanning tree, fossil and recent human means (and a single individual for Ain Dokhara), based on the full postcranial variable set, log shape data

The principal coordinates plot based on the five postcranial shape variables and its associated minimum spanning tree are shown in Figure 4. Recent African groups tend to cluster together on the right side of the plot, whereas recent Europeans and circum- polar groups tend to cluster together on the left.

— T. W. Holliday, Population Affinities of the Jebel Sahaba Skeletal Sample: Limb Proportion Evidence,

The Egyptians are connected via a short branch to recent African-Americans, who are then connected by one short branch to the recent Nubians and a second, much longer, branch to the African 'Pygmies'.

— T. W. Holliday, Population Affinities of the Jebel Sahaba Skeletal Sample: Limb Proportion Evidence,

In terms of dentition, an Ohio State University study found that Black-Americans are approximately intermediate between African and European populations. As noted, "[t]he results of this research support the main hypothesis; African Americans have become genetically closer to the average of western Europeans and West Africans since the two groups came into contact in the American colonies and later, the United States. Dental morphology reflects this change. The difference between West Africans and African Americans doubles in each time period, early, middle and late. African Americans are progressively becoming less like their West African ancestors. Also, when comparing contemporaneous early, middle, and late European Americans and African Americans, the difference shrinks over time. African Americans have tended toward the average of West Africans and western Europeans, and that this microevolutionary pattern is discernible using dental morphology. These conclusions are most clearly seen in the MMD results, but they are also generally true for pseudo-D2results."

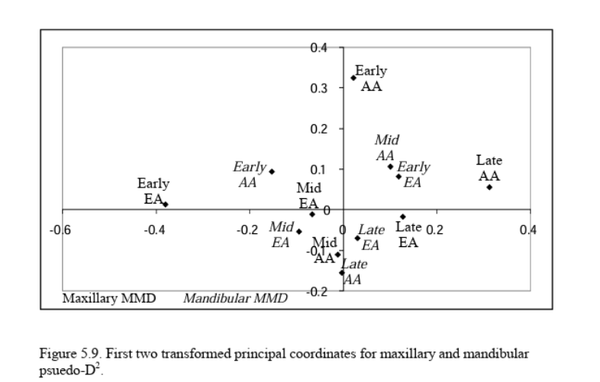
First two transformed principal coordinates

Furthermore the study found that the founding stock of European-Americans are dentally more similar to Black-Americans overall than modern day American citizens of European origin.

An interesting factor that was not anticipated was the changes over time in the dental morphology of European Americans. The sample from western Europe is more similar to the overall sample of African Americans than it is to the overall sample of European Americans. Historical studies indicate that the admixture of European genes into the African American gene pool seems to have come primarily prior to the Civil War (Williamson, 1980). This contention is supported by the present study. After the Civil War, the preponderance of Europeans immigrating to the United States were from eastern and southern Europe (Jones, 1992). These areas were excluded from the western European sample used in the present analysis. It seems that this change in migratory patterns altered the results relating to late time period European Americans. While African Americans over time have genetically become closer to the average of their two founding populations, dental morphology indicates that the pool of individuals who today are thought of as Americans of European heritage is of a somewhat different heritage than was true in previous generations. Contrary to prior thinking, new research indicates that it is also reflected the craniometrics of European immigrants to this country

— Heather Joy Hecht Edgar, Biological Distance and the African American Dentition,

A University of Nevada, Las Vegas study found that "[a] total of thirteen individuals [out of a sample of 50 Black-Americans] had shovel shaped incisor penetration, and two had double shovel incisors" , furthermore, "[s]ince shovel shaped incisors occur more frequently among Native Americans and Asians than other populations… the frequencies of these anterior dental nonmetric traits in a sample of African Americans [serves to substantiate admixture]"

== Linguistic anthropology ==
Ebonics (widely known as AAVE) was coined "by a Black scholar in 1975 but never adopted by linguists…[it was]...concocted from ebony (a color term from the name of a dark-colored wood) and phonics (the name of a method for teaching reading)"

However, it should not be confused with 'slang' as "an expression [is] slang when it represents a vivid, colloquial word or phrase associated with some subculture and not yet incorporated as part of the mainstream language. No subculture's slang could constitute a separate language."

As linguist Geoffrey K. Pullum states, "[s]lang is by definition parasitic on some larger and more encom- passing host language. It has no grammar of its own; it is a small array of words and phrases used under the aegis of some ordinary language and in accordance with its grammar. The majority of slang words and phrases are in the language already and are merely assigned new slang meanings by some subpopulation." And as he later adds, "[while the] majority of English speakers think that AAVE is just English with two added factors: some special slang terms and a lot of grammatical mistakes. They are simply wrong about this."

Pullum begins by pointing out that "there is obviously a difference between being an incorrect utterance of one language and being a correct utterance in another (perhaps only slightly different). This is obvious when the two languages are thoroughly different, like English and French. When a French speaker refers to the capital of the United Kingdom as Londres, it isn't a mistake; that's the correct French name for London. But the same is true when we are talking about two very closely related languages. There is a strong temptation, especially when one of the two has higher prestige, to take one to be the correct way to speak and the other to be incorrect. But it is not necessarily so."

Discussing the classification of Ebonics as a dialect of English, Pullum states, "Dialects and languages are in fact the same kinds of thing. "Dialect" does not mean a marginal, archaic, rustic, or degraded mode of speech. Linguists never say things like "That is just a dialect, not a language." Rather, they refer to one language as a dialect of another. The claim that Tosk is a dialect of Albanian is a classificatory claim, like saying that the white-tailed deer is a kind of deer. It is not some kind of put-down of Tosk speakers."

Noting that in particular that Ebonics bears a close connection to Early Modern English, Pullum states, "This is not an insulting or demeaning thing to say about AAVE. It merely places it in a linguistic classification that unites the language of Shakespeare and the language of the Oakland ghetto very closely compared to languages in other families or in other parts of the Germanic family."

One such example is the use of 'ax' in Ebonics, as Stanford University linguist John R. Rickford affirms, "Sheidlower says you can trace "ax" back to the eighth century. The pronunciation derives from the Old English verb "acsian." Chaucer used "ax." It's in the first complete English translation of the Bible (the Coverdale Bible): "'Axe and it shall be given.'"

Another such example is the use of double negatives, as "it's only since the eighteenth century that we became loath to use double negatives in this way …and to consider it wrong and illogical. Before then, speakers were using double negatives illogically daily (and probably twice on Sundays), from Chaucer to Shakespeare and many others."

"[t]he origin of [Ebonics] is unknown. Linguists are currently embroiled in the "creolist/anglicist" controversy concerning whether AAL originated as a creole formed on plantations, a working-class speech variety based on the language of plantation overseers, a mixture of the two… (Thomas 2007)."
