= Hongtao Yu =

Chinese chemist and academic administrator

- Education: University of Science and Technology of China; Chinese Academy of Sciences, Institute of Chemistry; Technical University of Munich
- Scientific career
- Fields: Chemistry
- Workplaces: Jackson State University; Morgan State University

Hongtao Yu is a chemist and academic administrator serving as the provost and senior vice president of academic affairs at Morgan State University, and a Fellow of the American Association for the Advancement of Science.

== Life ==
Yu completed a B.S. at the University of Science and Technology of China in 1982. He earned a M.S. from the Chinese Academy of Sciences in 1986. In 1990, Yu completed a Doctor of Natural Science degree at the Technical University of Munich. He was a postdoctoral fellow in the department of chemistry at the Louisiana State University from 1990 to 1994. Yu was a senior postdoctoral fellow in the department of medicinal chemistry in the college of pharmacy at University of Texas at Austin from 1994 to 1996.

Yu was an assistant professor of chemistry from 1996 to 2001 at the Jackson State University. He became an associate professor in 2001 and professor in 2006. He was chair of the department of chemistry and biochemistry from 2004 to 2016 after one year as the interim department chair. In 2016, Yu joined Morgan State University as dean and professor of chemistry in the school of computer, mathematical, and natural sciences. In 2021, he became provost and senior vice president for academic affairs.
