= Dwight O. W. Holmes =

American novelist

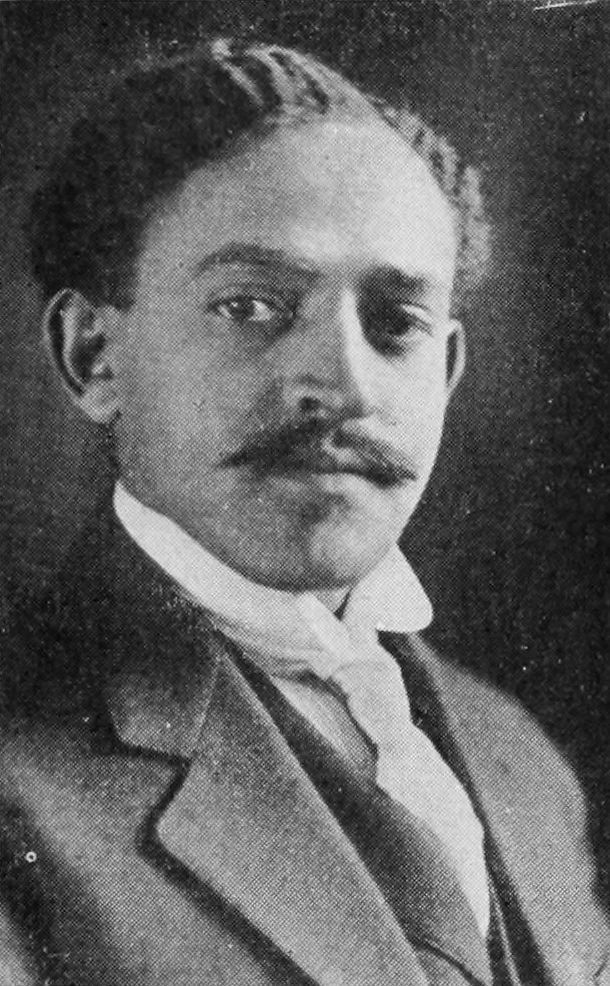

5th President of Morgan State College
- In office 1937–1948
- Preceded by: John O. Spencer
- Succeeded by: Martin D. Jenkins

Personal details
- Born: Dwight Oliver Wendell Kendell Holmes; November 18, 1877 Lewisburg, West Virginia, US
- Died: September 7, 1963 (aged 85)
- Education: Howard University, Columbia University
- Profession: College administrator, academic

Dwight Oliver Wendell Holmes (November 18, 1877 – September 7, 1963) was an American sociologist, civil rights activist, collegiate athlete, author, and served as the fifth president of Morgan State College from 1937 to 1948.

== Early life and career ==
Holmes was born in Lewisburg, West Virginia and raised in Annapolis, Maryland, New York City, and Staunton, Virginia. He was the son of the Reverend John A. Holmes, a pastor with the Metropolitan A.M.E. Church in Washington, D.C. for almost twenty years. As an undergraduate at Howard University, Holmes played quarterback and became the team captain of the Howard Bison football and baseball teams. Additionally, he became the president of the first tennis team at Howard, was a member of the debate and glee clubs. He earned a B.A. degree in 1901 and was valedictorian of the graduating class. Afterwards, Holmes continued his collegiate studies at Columbia University, where he earned both a M.A. and Ph.D.

In 1934, he wrote The Evolution of the Negro College, a book focusing on the development of Historically black colleges and universities (HBCUs), and the resources that these institutions should provide to the African-American population in the Southern states of the U.S. post-Civil War.

Holmes died on September 7, 1963, at the age of 85.
