= Gary Lynn Harris =

Gary Lynn Harris (1953 – 2020) was a professor of electrical engineering at Howard University and director of that school's National Nanotechnology Infrastructure Network facility. His research involved semiconductor fabrication of electronic and optical materials. He was one of the first two African Americans to receive a Ph.D. in electrical engineering from Cornell University, along with Michael Spencer.

== Life ==
Gary Lynn Harris received a B.S. in 1975, and an M.S. in 1976, for electrical engineering. From 1977 to 1980, he was an associate with the National Research and Resource Facility for Sumicron Structures (NRRFSS). From 1981 to 1982, he was a visiting scientist at the Naval Research Laboratory. In 1980 he became an associate professor at Howard University. In 1984 he became a consultant to the Lawrence Livermore National Laboratory. Harris remained a professor of electrical engineering at Howard University. He directed the school's National Nanotechnology Infrastructure Network node, one of 14 in the nation. He was Dean of the Graduate School and Associate Provost for Research at Howard. Gary Harris died on Monday, October 26, 2020.

== Notable works ==
- Gary Lynn Harris (1992). Amorphous and crystalline silicon carbide IV: proceedings of the 4th international conference, Santa Clara, CA, October 9-11, 1991. Springer. ISBN 978-3-540-55687-9.
- Mahmud Mahmudur Rahman; Cary Y.-W. Yang; Gary Lynn Harris (1989). Amorphous and crystalline silicon carbide II recent developments: proceedings of the 2nd International Conference, Santa Clara, CA, December 15-16, 1988. Springer-Verlag. ISBN 9780387516561.
- Gary Lynn Harris (1980). An experimental study of capless annealing of ion implanted gallium-arsenide. Cornell University, August.
- Gary Lynn Harris (1 November 2005). Properties of Silicon Carbide. Institution of Engineering & Technology. ISBN 978-0-86341-554-8.
