= Morgan Park Historic District =

- U.S. National Register of Historic Places
- U.S. Historic district
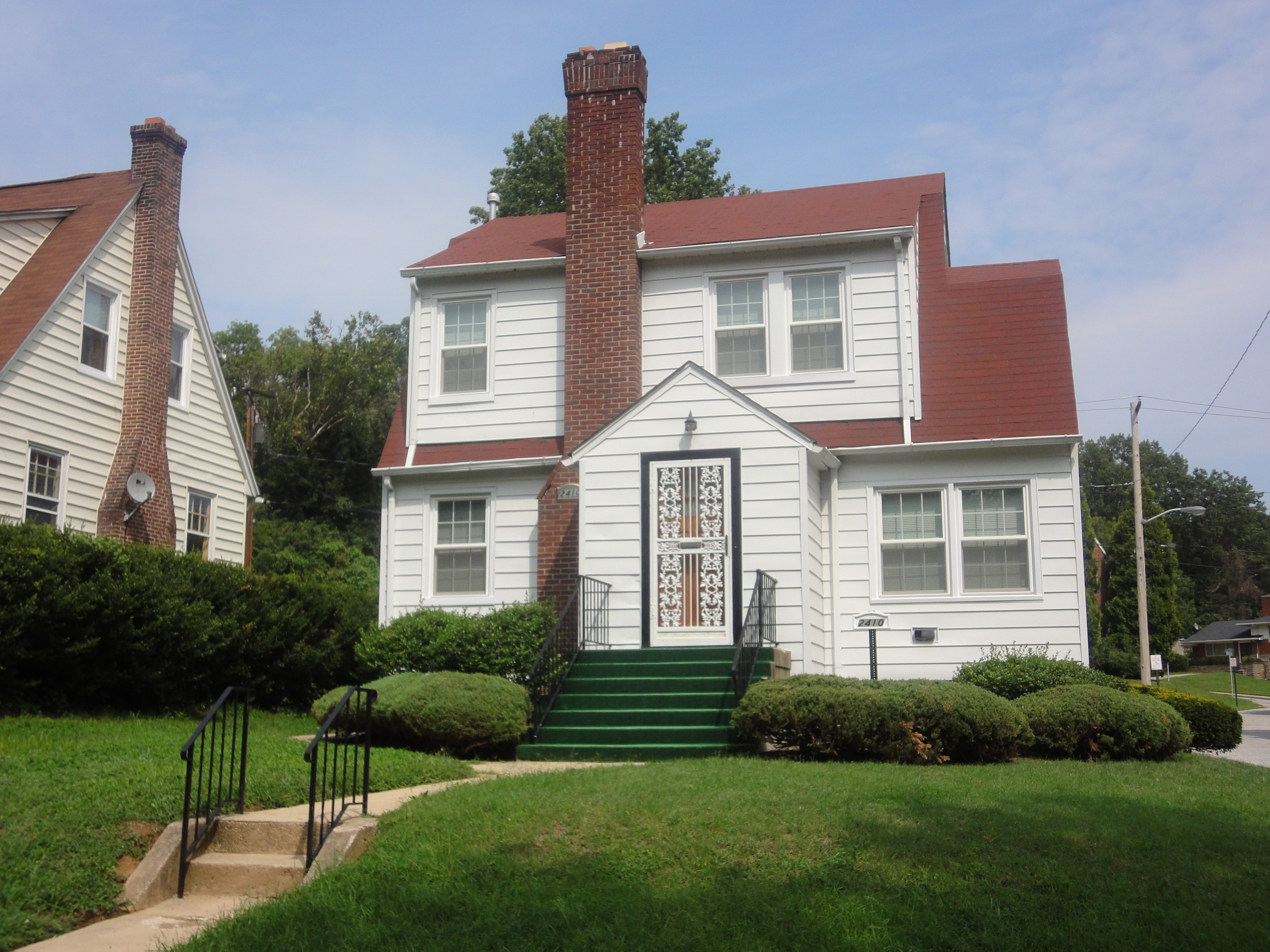
- A house in Morgan Park

- Location within Baltimore Location within Maryland Location within the United States
- Location: Roughly bounded by Herring Run Stream, East Cold Spring Lane and Charlton Ave. Baltimore, Maryland
- Coordinates: 39°20′51″N 76°34′43″W
- Area: 27 acres (11 ha)
- Built: 1918-1968
- Architect: George R. Morris, Albert I. Cassell, Saul Perdue
- Architectural style: Bungalow, Colonial Revival, Ranch, International Style, Contemporary, Split-level
- NRHP reference No.: 100004808
- Added to NRHP: March 9, 2020

Morgan Park Historic District, is a historic district located at Baltimore, Maryland, United States. The district encompasses 84 contributing historic resources built between 1918 and 1968. The area of detached single-family dwellings, was created as an exclusively black neighborhood for Morgan College faculty and black professionals. Especially prominent residents of Morgan Park include W.E.B. Dubois, influential scholar of black history and America's leading civil rights activist and a founder of the NAACP, and Carl J. Murphy, publisher who transformed The Baltimore Afro-American into a leading national black newspaper.

It was listed on the National Register of Historic Places in 2020.
