= Morgan State Bears lacrosse =

College level lacrosse team

1975 Morgan "Bears"

The Morgan State Bears lacrosse team is the collegiate sports team representing Morgan State University in Baltimore, Maryland. Upon its founding in 1970, it was the only lacrosse team established to play NCAA-level lacrosse at a historically black institution.

In its early years, team defeated schools like Harvard and Notre Dame and upset a #1 ranked team in 1975. The team's exploits are recounted in the book Ten Bears, and the story is in production for a major motion picture. The program was later shut down, though a club team was created in the 21st century and a new intercollegiate team at the school won the NCL championship in 2023.

== History ==
Morgan State University was founded and chartered in 1867 as the Centenary Biblical Institute. It was built on its present site, in northeast Baltimore, in 1890 and was known as Morgan College from 1890 to 1938. It became a public college in 1939, as Morgan State College.

The late 1960s were turbulent years with regard to race relations in the United States. Riots had broken out in major cities across the country, with at least three in Maryland. Dr. Martin Luther King Jr. had been assassinated and formerly all white universities and colleges were opening their doors to African-Americans for the first time. But the major lacrosse powers like Johns Hopkins, Navy and Maryland still fielded mostly white teams.

The team was formed in 1970 when a former Baltimore high school lacrosse player and Morgan grad student, Howard "Chip" Silverman, realized that many of black Baltimore's high school lacrosse players were at Morgan, but were not playing lacrosse. Silverman had never coached before, but, he put up flyers around campus, and 30 athletes showed up for a meeting. Two-thirds were football players. Some would later star in the NFL, such as Stan Cherry. Silverman started the lacrosse club and two years later petitioned the NCAA for full membership as a college team. At that time, the NCAA had its best 40 teams in Division I and another 80 teams in Division II. It was Division II that Morgan would soon dominate.

Ironically, by 1975 Morgan became noted for its lacrosse team because black high school lacrosse players from Maryland and New York still had trouble getting into the major white lacrosse colleges and universities. Morgan was the first (and until the turn of the 21st century) the only historically black university to field a lacrosse team.

During the period from 1970 to 1975, the Bears were ranked in the nation's top 25 in four out of five years. They made the championship tournament twice, and in 1975 were involved in one of the great upsets in intercollegiate sports history, when Morgan defeated then #1 ranked Washington and Lee University, a lacrosse team which would eventually reach the NCAA Division I semi-finals as the number seven seed. Washington & Lee had not lost a regular season or home game the prior two seasons.

After the 1975 season, Silverman retired as the Bears lacrosse coach, and Morgan never again had a winning season. By 1981 Title IX funding priorities required university athletic funds be equally distributed among women's programs and the school dropped lacrosse in 1981.

The 1981 Bears team featured some of the most talented players in the nation. Gene White, who would later coach the newly formed club team in 2005, and Lou Carter where NCAA Top 25 scoring leaders while goalie Cedric White was in the NCAA Top 10 in goals blocked during the season. In addition, there were a core of freshmen and sophomores who had played the game at early ages that gave the team even more potential for the next seasons that would not be. As a testament to the Bears' legacy, the 1981 team coached by National Lacrosse Hall of Fame inductee (2005) Sheldon Freed, defeated Notre Dame (13-12), Villanova (16-9), Michigan State and Georgetown in the span of a five-day schedule during the middle of the season. and lost to Loyola in the NCAA Division II Championship Semi-Finals to end an era.

=== 21st-century comeback ===
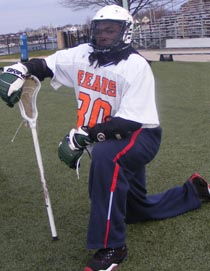
Morgan lacrosse-2008

More than 20 years after the original team was shut down, Morgan State returned to lacrosse. In 2005 a lacrosse club team was formed on campus and is awaiting acceptance into the NCAA. Coach Gene White, a player from the original incarnation, commented, "I think it is the greatest thing that has happened since I played for Morgan in '81". The 2005 club was not a sanctioned team in NCAA competition, but they did play exhibition games against teams that were.

=== NCL era ===
In 2022, Morgan made another return to lacrosse in the form of NCL (Next Collegiate League), led by Kobie Johnson who also won 1st Team All League honors. In 2023 the leaders were Charles Pitt(1st Team All League) and Jaden Scott (2nd Team All League), the team had an outstanding record of 12 wins and 1 loss in the teams second season while also earning their place as the 2023 NCL champions. The team is now coached by Head Coach Skylar Hargrave assisted by Devin Richards, Ibukun Alo, and Bill Krehnbrink. In 2024 the Bears found themselves in playoff contention, but they lost I the first round to the Delaware State University Hornets. The team looks to have a successful 2025 season.

=== Morgan State University Division II / III All-Americans ===
As listed by the United States Intercollegiate Lacrosse Association:

- 1971 - Wayne Jackson
- 1972 - Wayne Jackson
- 1973 - Wayne Jackson
- 1974 - Dave Raymond and Courtenay Servary
- 1975 - Dave Raymond, Courtenay Servary and Tyrone Jones
- 1976 - Joe Fowlkes
- 1977 - Joe Fowlkes
- 1978 - Joe Fowlkes

=== Morgan State University Representatives in the North/South Game ===
As listed by the United States Intercollegiate Lacrosse Association:

- 1971 - Miles Harrison
- 1973 - Wayne Jackson
- 1975 - Dave Raymond
- 1978 - Joe Fowlkes
- 1981 - Mike McBride

== Legacy ==
In 2015, US Lacrosse announced that it would create a permanent exhibit in its new museum to honor the Morgan State lacrosse team.

=== Alumni ===
Stan Cherry was signed as a linebacker in the National Football League.

Both Tony Fulton and Curt Anderson were elected to the Maryland House of Delegates

Three time all-American Joe Fowlkes became a security consultant, while George Kelley went into law enforcement.

Dr. Miles Harrison and Coach Chip Silverman collaborated on the book, Ten Bears, which is being made into a movie. Silverman died in March 2008. Dr. Harrison's son, Kyle Harrison, was the #1 draft pick of Major League Lacrosse in 2005, after leading Johns Hopkins to a national championship the same year and winning the Tewaaraton trophy.

== In popular media ==
Two documentaries have been shot on the team, one, produced by Jeremy Schaap, aired on ESPN in 2006 and the second, produced by Luke David, airs on PBS in early April, 2008.

=== Season-by-season results ===
Season	W	L
2006	0	7
2007	3	10
2008	0	6

2006 Morgan club lacrosse season

Date	Time	Opponent	W/L	Score	Site	City
02/28/06	5:00pm	UMBC	L	3-9	UMBC Stadium	Catonsville, MD
02/25/06	3:00pm	George Washington	L	2-8	GW-Mount Vernon Athletic Complex	Washington, DC
03/11/06	2:00pm	Johns Hopkins	L	5-8	Homewood Field	Baltimore, MD
03/11/06	3:00pm	Towson	L	2-14	Homewood Field	Baltimore, MD
3/16/06	6:00pmpm	Loyola	L	2-9	Geppi-Aikens Field	Baltimore, MD
4/09/06	3:00pm	Howard	L	8-9	Greene Stadium	Washington, DC
4/15/06	4:15pm	Washington College	L	0-1	Shriver Field	Chestertown, MD

2007 Morgan club lacrosse season

Date	Time	Opponent	W/L	Score	Site	City
03/03/07	12:00pm	Maryland	L	3-14	Recreation Field 1	College Park
03/03/07	2:00pm	Washington College	L	3-13	Recreation Field 1	College Park
03/07/07	5:00pm	Johns Hopkins	L	1-13	Homewood Field	Baltimore
03/10/07	4:00pm	Salisbury	L	4-13	Intramural Fields	Salisbury, MD
03/11/07	2:15pm	Mt. St. Mary's	W	6-4	Mt. St. Mary's	Emmitsburg, MD
03/11/07	3:00pm	Frostburg	L	8-9	Mt. St. Mary's	Emmitsburg, MD
3/30/07	7:00pm	Navy	L	1-8	Rip Miller Field	Annaoplis
3/31/07	4:00pm	UMBC	W	9-8	UMBC Club Fields	Catonsville, MD
4/01/07	2:00pm	Loyola	L	2-15	Geppi-Aikens Field	Baltimore, MD
4/07/07	2:00pm	Delaware	L	5-17	Frazier Field	Newark, De.
4/14/07	4:00pm	Howard	W	9-4	Herring Run Park	Baltimore, MD
4/15/07	6:00pm	Johns Hopkins	L	8-9	Homewood Field	Baltimore, MD
4/28/07	2:00pm	University of Baltimore	L	3-14	Mt. Washington Field	Baltimore, MD

2008 Morgan club lacrosse season

Date	Time	Opponent	W/L	Score	Site	City
02/24/08	2:00pm	UMBC	ppd	rain	UMBC field	Catonsville, MD
03/01/08	3:00pm	Maryland	L	1-13	Recreation Field 1	College Park
03/18/08	6:00pm	Navy	L	1-15	Rip Miller Field	Annapolis
03/29/08	1:00pm	Towson			Burdick Field	Towson
03/30/08	2:30pm	Loyola	L	0-1	Herring Run Park	Baltimore
4/05/08	2:00pm	NYU	L	3-16	UMBC Turf	Baltimore
4/06/08	2:00pm	UMBC	L	6-8	UMBC Turf	Baltimore
4/10/08	4:00pm	Delaware	L	0-1	Rollo Stadium	Delaware
4/26/08	3:00pm	George Washington			GW-Mount Vernon Athletic Complex	Washington, DC
