= David Wilson (university administrator) =

American university administrator

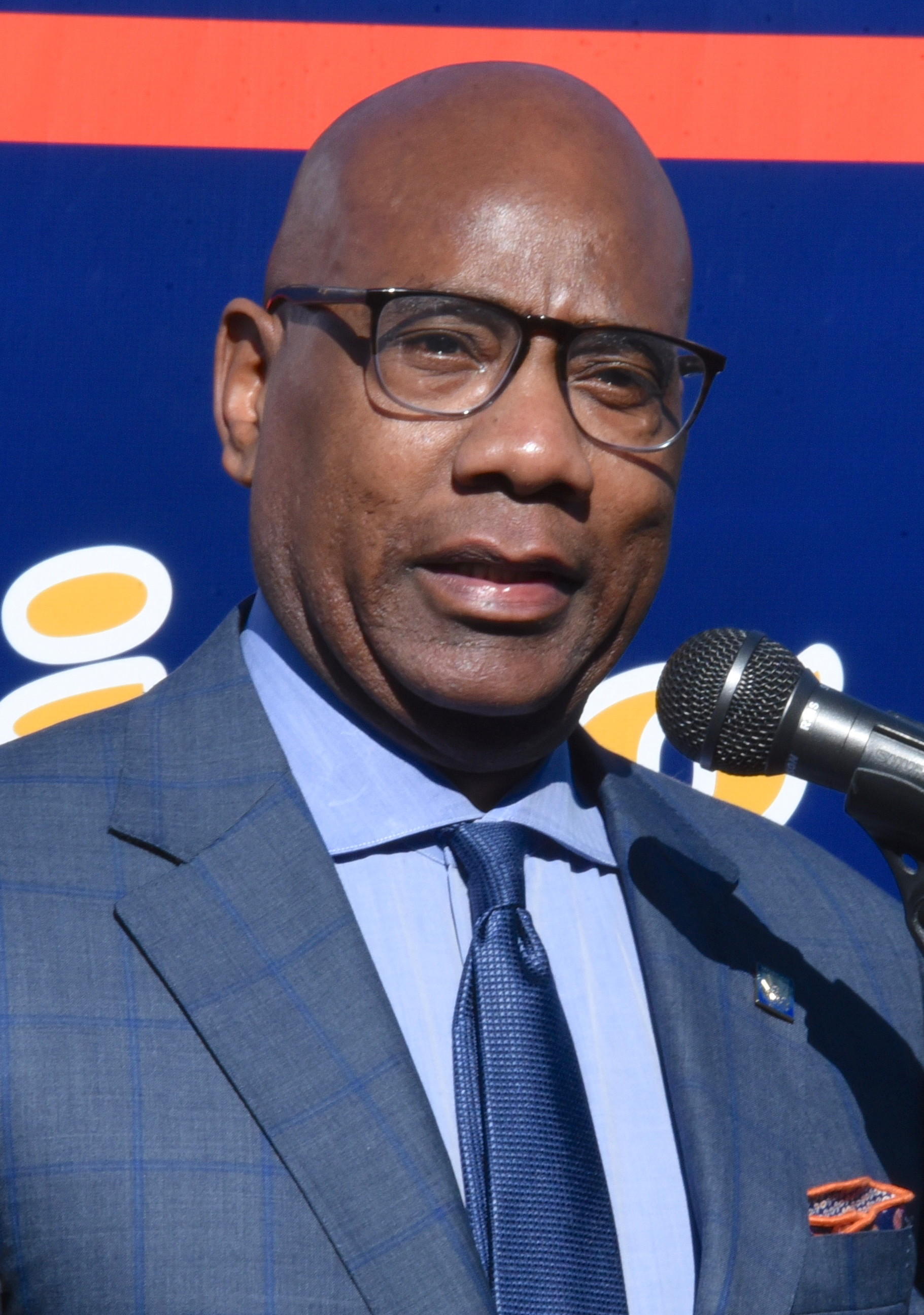

10th President of Morgan State University
- Incumbent
- Assumed office July 1, 2010
- Preceded by: Earl S. Richardson

Personal details
- Born: Marengo County, Alabama, U.S.
- Education: Tuskegee University (BA, MEd); Harvard University (MEd, EdD)

David K. Wilson is an American university administrator who has been the tenth president of Morgan State University in Baltimore, Maryland since July 1, 2010.

== Early life and education ==
Wilson grew up with 10 siblings on a sharecropper farm in McKinley, Alabama. His father farmed cotton and okra. His early years were spent in a shanty with no electricity or plumbing. He recalls that he learned to read from perusing the pages of Look and Life Magazines that his mom had plastered against the wall of the house to keep the cold wind out in the winter. As a sharecropper's child, Wilson rarely attended school full-time during the harvest season and was in the seventh grade before he went to school five days per week. He was the first person in his family to attend college.

Wilson earned his Bachelor of Science in Political Science in 1977 and a Master of Education degree in 1979 at the Tuskegee Institute (now Tuskegee University) in Tuskegee, Alabama.

He earned another Master of Education degree in 1984 and a Doctor of Education in 1987, both from the Harvard Graduate School of Education. His doctorate thesis at Harvard was Going from Black to Black and White: a case study of the desegregation of Kentucky State University.

== Career ==
He currently serves as the 10th President of Morgan State University in Baltimore, Maryland, having been appointed on July 1, 2010. Prior to becoming President at Morgan, he was the Chancellor of the University of Wisconsin–Extension and the University of Wisconsin Colleges from 2006-2010. He was the first person in the history of the University of Wisconsin System to serve as Chancellor of two statewide institutions simultaneously. From 1995-2006, Wilson served as Vice President for University Outreach and Associate Provost at Auburn University in Alabama. He was the first African-American to hold a Vice Presidency at Auburn, and the first African-American to hold any senior administrative appointment at a predominantly white university in the State of Alabama. Prior to that, Wilson was Assistant Provost, from 1988 to 1990, of Rutgers University in New Jersey and associate provost from 1990 to 1995 at Rutgers.

Wilson also served as Director of the Office of Minority Programs and Program Officer at the Woodrow Wilson National Fellowship Foundation in Princeton, New Jersey, from 1984 to 1988.

Wilson was a Woodrow Wilson Foundation Administrative Fellow, serving as Executive Assistant to Vice-President for Business Affairs and Finance at Kentucky State University in Frankfort, Kentucky from 1984 to 1985.

Wilson has won numerous awards and recognitions. He was a Fellow at the W. K. Kellogg Foundation, served on President Barack Obama's Board of Advisors on Historically Black Colleges and Universities, named one of America's Best and Brightest by Dollars and Sense Magazine, named one of America's top 100 administrators by Change Magazine of the American Association of Higher Education, received the Distinguished Leadership for Engaged Scholarship Award from the University of Alabama, was part of the planning team that assisted in the formation of the University of Namibia in Africa, among countless other recognitions. He is a member of the American Academy of Arts and Sciences and as the 2023 recipient of the McGraw Prize in Higher Education. His alma mater, Tuskegee University, bestowed on him an honorary degree.
