= King Virgil Cheek =

American educator, lawyer, and author

7th President of Morgan State University
- In office 1971–1974
- Preceded by: Martin D. Jenkins
- Succeeded by: Andrew Billingsley

Personal details
- Born: King Virgil Cheek, Jr. May 26, 1937 (age 89) Weldon, North Carolina, U.S.
- Education: Bates College, University of Chicago
- Profession: College administrator, Academia, Civil-rights activist

King Virgil Cheek (born May 26, 1937) is an American educator who served as the president of Shaw University from 1969 to 1971, and also served as the seventh president of Morgan State University from 1971 to 1974. He was an active participant in the Civil Rights Movement of the 1950s and 1960s, including participating in the March on Washington in 1963. He is the author of numerous books including The Quadrasoul, novels that explore the four dimensions of the human spirit.

== Early life and career ==
He was born on May 26, 1937, in Weldon, North Carolina, his father was a Baptist minister and his mother was an insurance broker. Cheek graduated from James B. Dudley High School in Greensboro, North Carolina, and continued his education at Bates College in Lewiston, Maine, where he majored in Economics. He received his B.A. in 1959, and later continued his collegiate studies at the University of Chicago where he earned a M.A. degree in 1967. Afterwards, he earned a J.D. degree from the University of Chicago Law School in 1969.

In 1969, Cheek was appointed the President of Shaw University where he served in that post until 1971. Previously, he had served as Shaw's Dean and Vice President. In 1971, Cheek was appointed as the 7th President of Morgan State University in Baltimore, Maryland, where he served until 1974. He served as the vice president of the Union Institute and University from 1974 to 1976, and president from 1976 to 1978.

In 1978, Cheek made a career change and dedicate more time to leadership development, and created the Center for Leadership and Career Development in Washington, D.C. He has also worked as a professor of Social Science and as Dean of Graduate Studies at the New York Institute of Technology.
