= Morgan State University =

Historically black university in Baltimore, Maryland, US

- Former names: Centenary Biblical Institute (1867–1890); Morgan College (1890–1939); Morgan State College (1939–1975)
- Motto: Growing the Future and Leading the World
- Type: Public historically black research university
- Established: 1867; 159 years ago
- Academic affiliations: CUMU; USU; space-grant
- President: David Wilson
- Provost: Hongtao Yu
- Academic staff: 818
- Administrative staff: 2,108
- Students: 10,739 (fall 2024)
- Undergraduates: 9,027 (fall 2024)
- Postgraduates: 1,712 (fall 2024)
- Location: Baltimore, Maryland, United States; 39°20′38″N 76°35′05″W
- Campus: Urban, 143 acres (0.58 km^{2})
- Newspaper: The Spokesman
- Colors: Blue and orange
- Nickname: Bears
- Sporting affiliations: National Collegiate Athletic Association; NCAA Division I – Mid-Eastern Athletic Conference (MEAC)
- Website: www.morgan.edu

Morgan State University (Morgan State or MSU) is a public historically black research university in Baltimore, Maryland, United States. It is the third largest among all Historically Black Colleges or Universities (HBCUs). In 1890, the university, then known as the Centenary Biblical Institute, changed its name to honor Lyttleton Morgan, the first chairman of its board of trustees and a donor. It became a university in 1975.

Although a public institution, Morgan State is not a part of the University System of Maryland. It is a member of the Thurgood Marshall College Fund. It is accredited by the Middle States Commission on Higher Education. and classified among "R2: Doctoral Universities – High research activity".

== History ==
Presidents of Morgan State University
Centenary Biblical Institute
- 1869–1882: J. Emory Round
- 1882–1888: W. Maslin Frysinger

Morgan College
- 1888–1901: John J. Wagner
- 1901–1902: Charles Edmond Young (acting)
- 1902–1937: John O. Spencer

Morgan State College
- 1937–1948: Dwight O.W. Holmes
- 1948–1970: Martin D. Jenkins
- 1970–1971: Thomas P. Fraser, II (interim)
- 1971–1974: King Virgil Cheek
- 1974–1975: Thomas P. Fraser

Morgan State University
- 1975–1984: Andrew Billingsley
- 1984–2010: Earl S. Richardson
- 2010–present: David Wilson

Morgan State University (MSU) is a historically black college in Baltimore, Maryland. It was founded in 1867 as the Centenary Biblical Institute, a Methodist Episcopal seminary, to train young men in the ministry. At the time of his death, Thomas Kelso, co-founder and president of the board of directors, endowed the Male Free School and Colored Institute through a legacy of his estate.

It later broadened its mission to educate both men and women as teachers. The school was renamed as Morgan College in 1890 in honor of the Reverend Lyttleton Morgan, the first chairman of its board of trustees, who donated land to the college. In 1895, the institution awarded its first baccalaureate degree to George W. F. McMechen, after whom the building of the school of business and management is named today. McMechen later earned a law degree from Yale University and, after establishing his career, became one of Morgan's main financial supporters.

John O. Spencer became the fifth president of Morgan College in 1902, and served in that position until 1937. In 1902, Morgan's assets were a little over $100,000 in grounds, equipment and endowments, including its branch schools at the time; the then Princess Anne Academy and the Virginia Collegiate and Industrial Institute. During his tenure as president, the university saw major expansions across the campus. By 1937, the school's assets were more than $1,000,000 and its enrollment had grown from 150 to 487. It also saw the first "Era of Progress" as the college transformed from a college supported by the religious community (which focused primarily upon training young men and women for the ministry) to a college gaining support from private foundations, and offering liberal arts academic degree for a variety of professions. In 1915, Andrew Carnegie donated to the school a grant of $50,000 for a central academic building. The terms of the grant included the purchase of a new site for the College, payment of all outstanding obligations, and the construction of a building to be named after him. The College met the conditions and moved to its present site in northeast Baltimore in 1917.

In 1918, the white community of Lauraville tried to have the sale revoked by filing suit in the circuit court in Towson, upset that the Ivy Mill property, the planned location of Morgan State, had been sold to a "negro" college. The circuit court dismissed the suit, which the community appealed to the Maryland Court of Appeals. The appellate court upheld the lower court decision, finding no basis that siting the college at this location would constitute a public nuisance. Despite some ugly threats and several demonstrations against the project, Morgan College was constructed at the new site and later expanded. Carnegie Hall, the oldest original building on the present Morgan campus, was erected a year later.

Morgan remained a private institution until 1939. That year, the state of Maryland purchased the school. Morgan College became Morgan State College. In 1975, Morgan State added several doctoral programs and was designated as a university by state legislature.

=== 21st century ===
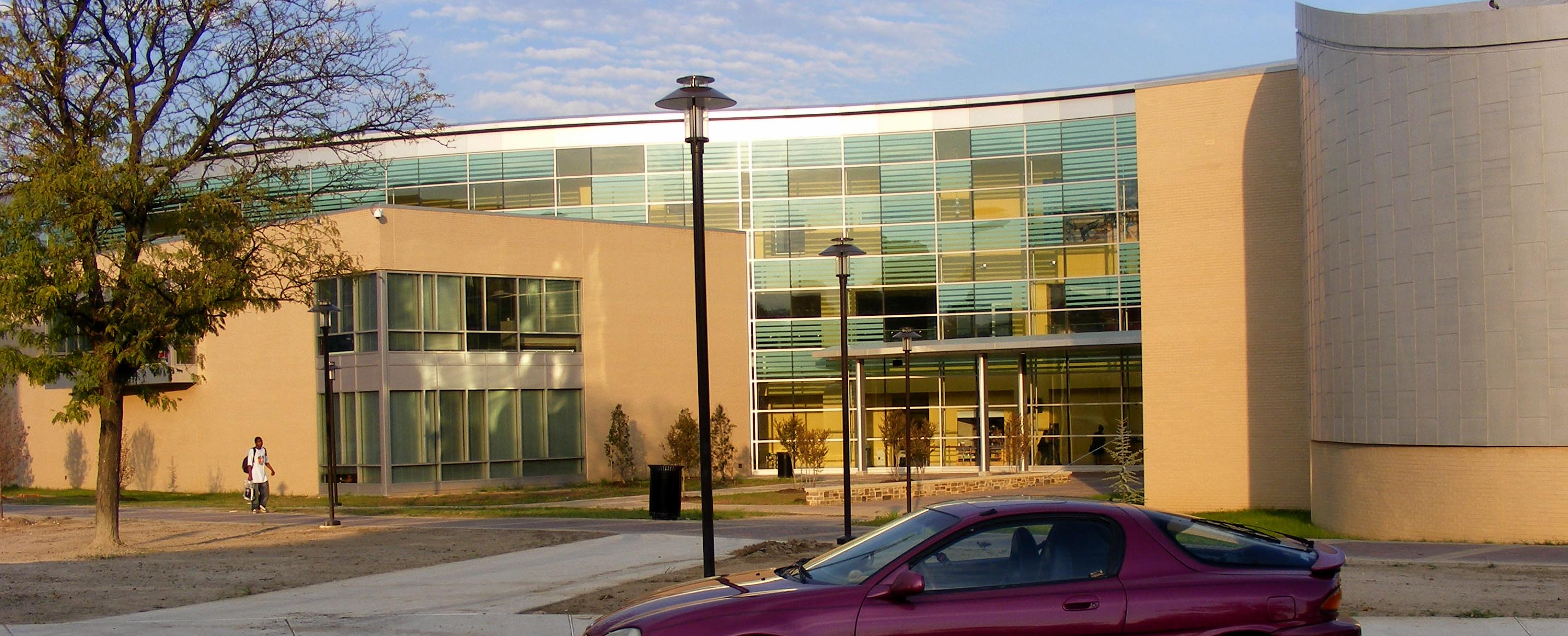
New student union building

In the 21st century, the university has seen the construction of a new student union, two dedicated parking garages, the Earl S. Richardson Library, the Dixon Research Center, the Communications Building, and the Center for the Built Environment and Infrastructure Studies.

The Carl J. Murphy Fine Arts Center is also the home of the James E. Lewis Museum of Art. In September 2012, Morgan State opened the Center for the Built Environment and Infrastructure Studies (CBEIS) which houses the School of Architecture and Planning, School of Transportation Studies, and the School of Engineering.

In 2020, MacKenzie Scott donated $40 million to Morgan State. The following year, Calvin E. Tyler Jr. donated $20 million to endow scholarships. In 2025, MacKenzie Scott donated an additional $63 million to Morgan State, the largest donation in the history of the institution.

The National Trust for Historic Preservation has designated Morgan State University as a National Treasure, the only such honor for a college or university campus in the United States. The neighboring Morgan Park Historic District was listed on the National Register of Historic Places in 2020.

== Academics ==
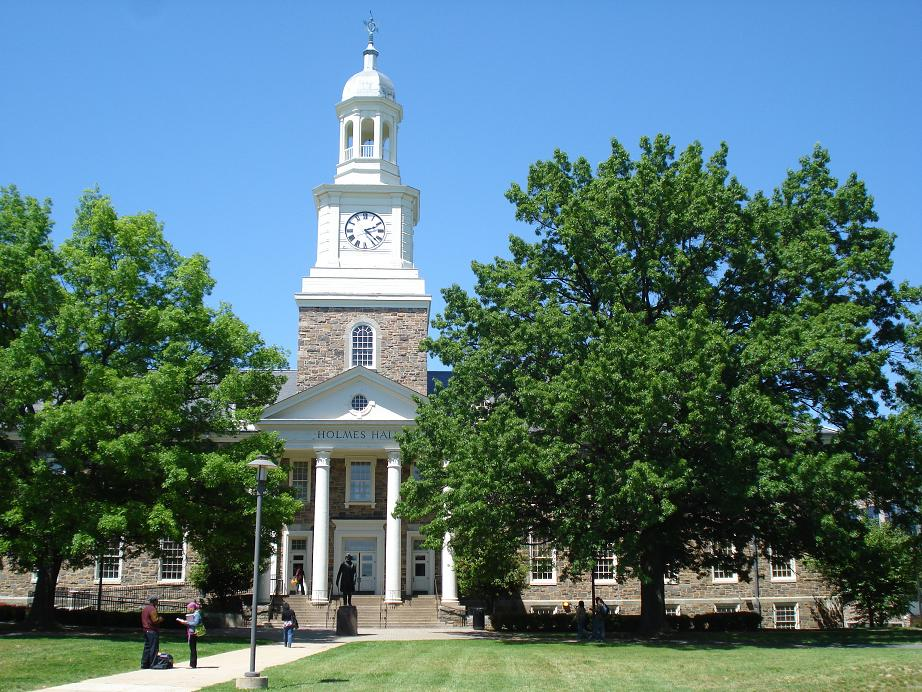
The historic Holmes Hall

Morgan State awards baccalaureate, master's, and doctorate degrees.

Morgan has educated over 100 Fulbright scholars, the most of any HBCU. Morgan is also first among HBCUs in the number of Fulbright-related grants awarded to students, faculty, and administrators. It is one of the 19 schools included on the inaugural Fulbright HBCU Institutional Leaders list. Since instituting the Fulbright program, Morgan State University has trained 144 Fulbright awardees initiating international studies in 43 different countries. Moreover, 51 MSU professors or administrators (none of whom were Morgan graduates) have earned 73 "Senior Fulbright" awards to 42 countries.

=== Schools and colleges ===
The university operates twelve colleges, schools, and institutes.

- James H. Gilliam, Jr. College of Liberal Arts
- School of Computer, Mathematical, and Natural Sciences
- Clarence M. Mitchell School of Engineering
- School of Architecture and Planning
- Earl G. Graves School of Business and Management
- School of Community Health and Policy
- School of Global Journalism and Communication
- School of Education & Urban Studies
- School of Social Work
- College of Interdisciplinary and Continuing Studies
- Dr. Clara I. Adams Honors College
- School of Graduate Studies
- Patuxent Environmental & Aquatic Research Laboratory (PEARL)

==== James H. Gilliam, Jr. College of Liberal Arts ====
The College of Liberal Arts offers degree programs in the arts, history, humanities, military and social sciences, and hosts two museums: the James E. Lewis Museum of Art and Lillie Carroll Jackson Civil Rights Museum. The James E. Lewis Museum of Art (JELMA) is the cultural extension of Morgan State University's Fine Arts academic program. The Lillie Carroll Jackson Civil Rights Museum illustrates the last recorded lynching in Maryland.

==== School of Computer, Mathematical, & Natural Sciences ====
The School of Computer, Mathematical, & Natural Sciences offers undergraduate majors and minors as well as graduate degree programs in the natural and formal sciences. The chemistry program is approved by the American Chemical Society (ACS). The medical laboratory science program is accredited by the National Accrediting Agency for Clinical Laboratory Sciences (NAACLS) and the American Society for Clinical Pathology (ASCP). The actuarial science program is approved by the Society of Actuaries (SOA). It also hosts the university's environmental and aquatic research laboratory, PEARL.

==== Clarence M. Mitchell School of Engineering ====
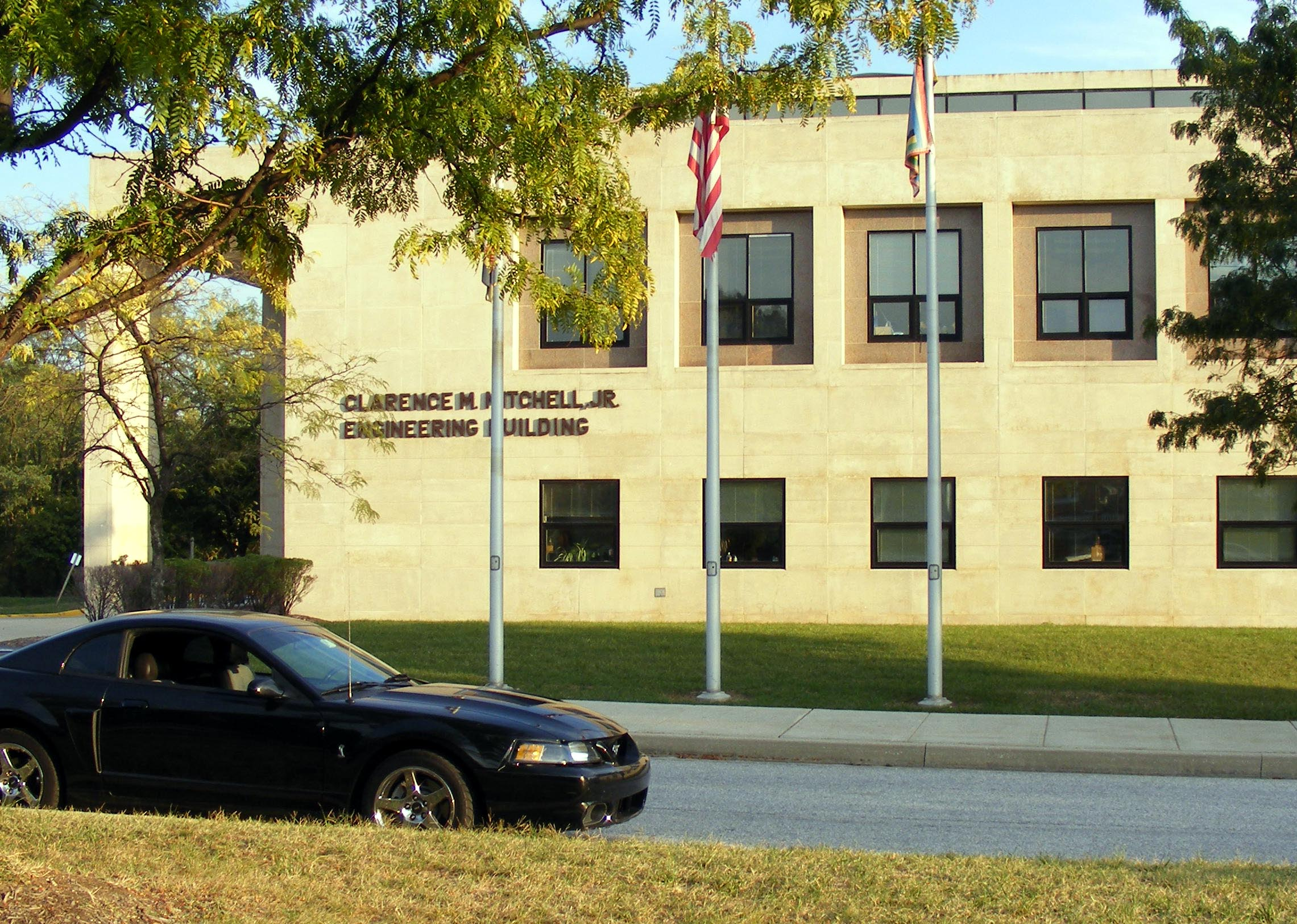
Clarence M. Mitchell, Jr. School of Engineering building

The School of Engineering offers Accreditation Board for Engineering and Technology (ABET) accredited degrees in engineering and admitted its first class starting in 1984. The first graduates received degrees in 1988. Eugene M. DeLoatch (retired 2016) was the first Dean of the School of Engineering, having previously been Chairman of the Department of Electrical Engineering at Howard University. He was succeeded by Michael G. Spencer who was previously a professor of electrical engineering at Cornell University. By 1991, the construction of the 35,000 sq ft (3,300 m^{2}) Clarence M. Mitchell, Jr. School of Engineering building was completed, and the facility included sixteen teaching laboratories and five research laboratories. The William Donald Schaefer Building is a 40,000 sq ft (3,700 m^{2}) addition to the Engineering School and was completed in April 1998. The facility provided instructional laboratories, classrooms, a student lounge, research laboratories and a 2,200 sq ft (200 m^{2}) library annex.

In 2015 Morgan State University's School of Engineering graduates provided more than two-thirds of the state's African-American Civil Engineers, 60 percent of the African-American Electrical Engineers, 80 percent of the African-American Telecommunications specialists, more than one-third of the African-American Mathematicians, and all of Maryland's Industrial Engineers.

==== School of Architecture and Planning (S+AP) ====
In 1997, the school became the only HBCU to establish accredited architecture, landscape architecture, and city and regional planning programs. A plan was announced by the university president, Earl Richardson in 2005, for the program to establish school status and it was designated as the School of Architecture and Planning (S+AP) in 2008. Construction began in 2010 to house all of the related majors. The Center of Built and Environmental Studies (CBEIS) was designed by in association with the Freelon Group. The School of Architecture and Planning granted its first interior design degree in 2020. The school offers bachelor's through doctoral programs in architecture and is accredited by the National Architectural Accrediting Board (NAAB) and National Council of Architectural Registration Boards (NCARB).

==== Earl G. Graves School of Business and Management ====
The Earl G. Graves School of Business and Management (GSBM) is named in honor of alumnus Earl G. Graves, Sr. and is housed in the Graves School of Business and Management building, which was opened for the Fall Semester 2015 at the western edge of the campus. It contains classrooms, laboratories, and office buildings with rooms for hospitality management students to operate. The GSBM offers Bachelor of Science, Master of Science, Master of Business Administration, and PhD degree programs. These programs are accredited by The Association to Advance Collegiate Schools of Business (AACSB).

==== School of Community Health and Policy ====
The School of Community Health and Policy offers an American Association of Colleges of Nursing (AACN) accredited program in nursing, degree programs in nutritional sciences and health education, and graduate programs leading to the Master of Public Health, Master of Science, and Doctor of Public Health (DrPH).

The university's nursing class of 2018 scored a perfect pass rate, the first perfect score for an entire nursing program class at Morgan, and the only four-year nursing program in Maryland to achieve a 100 percent pass rate that year.

==== School of Global Journalism and Communication ====
Established in 2013, Morgan's School of Global Journalism and Communication is one of only two Maryland-based universities with an internationally accredited journalism school. The School of Global Journalism and Communication degree programs include journalism, strategic communications, and multiplatform production. The programs are accredited by the Accrediting Council on Education in Journalism and Mass Communications (ACEJMC), as recognized by the Association for Education in Journalism and Mass Communication (AEJMC).

The school is also the host of the student-run newspaper The Spokesman, the university's radio station WMUR Baltimore, and its television network BEAR-TV.

==== School of Education & Urban Studies ====
The School of Education houses the teacher education and institution administrator programs. The teacher education program is accredited by the Council for the Accreditation of Educator Preparation (CEAP).

==== School of Social Work ====
The School of Social Work offers undergraduate and graduate programs leading to the Doctor of Social Work (DSW). These programs are accredited by the Council on Social Work Education (CSWE).

==== College of Interdisciplinary and Continuing Studies ====
The College of Interdisciplinary and Continuing Studies provides degree programs to learners with previously earned college credits but no degree, affording the opportunity of degree completion. The interdisciplinary nature of the programs allows students to draw from expertise and resources across campus to design a program of study aligned with local, national and global workforce opportunities.

==== Dr. Clara I. Adams Honors College ====
The Dr. Clara I. Adams Honors College admits high performing and achieving undergraduate students, affording them scholarship awards and extracurricular resources including research opportunities and study abroad.

==== School of Graduate Studies ====
The School of Graduate Studies houses the doctoral degree programs.

=== Library ===
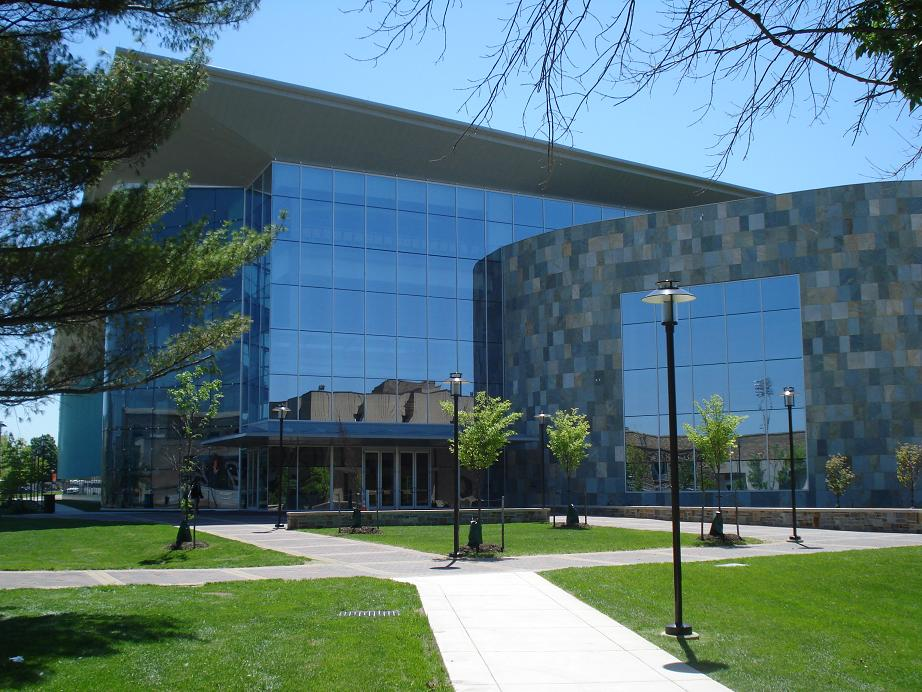
Earl S. Richardson Library

The Earl S. Richardson Library's is the main academic information resource center on the campus. Constructed in 2008, the building covers approximately 222,517 square feet. The library's holding constitutes over 500,000 volumes, and access to over 1 million e-books and 5,000 periodical titles. There are 167 online databases that are subscribed to the Library. Reading and studying spaces are provided with wired and wireless access to databases for research. One such collection in the volumes includes books on Africa, with an emphasis on sub-Saharan Africa. The African-American collection includes papers and memorabilia of such persons as Emmett Jay Scott, secretary to Booker T. Washington. The Forbush Collection is composed of materials associated with the Quakers and slavery. The Martin D. Jenkins Collection was acquired in 1980.

== Research ==
Morgan is a public research university that engages in active research with several national and international organizations and agencies including the National Science Foundation, National Institutes of Health, and United States Department of Defense.

The research centers and programs are supported by and operated out of the various schools and institutions of the university.

=== Patuxent Environmental & Aquatic Research Laboratory ===
The Morgan State University Patuxent Environmental & Aquatic Research Laboratory (PEARL) is located 80 miles south of the main campus on the shoreline of the Patuxent River - a major tributary of the Chesapeake Bay. PEARL research is designed to increase the understanding of coastal and environmental systems so that they can be properly managed and protected. PEARL is dedicated to solving complex environmental problems, applying interdisciplinary approaches to studying the connections between complex ecological systems, while providing society with knowledge to meet the environmental challenges of the 21st century.

== Campus ==
Morgan has an over 100-acre sprawling campus in the northeast neighborhood of Baltimore city. The campus is surrounded by residential suburbs with Lake Montebello to the south. The university's campus is designated as a national historic site for preservation by the National Trust for Historic Preservation.

== Enrollment ==
From 2006 to 2019 the number of African-American students remained constant, but the numbers of other racial groups, including Hispanic/Latine and non-Hispanic white students increased. In 2006 the student count was 6,700, including 60 Hispanic/Latine students, in 2019 it was up to 7,700, including 260 Hispanic/Latine students, and in 2024 it was up to 9,808, including 476 Hispanic/Latine students.

As of Fall of 2025, there were 11,559 students, being 9,554 undergraduates and 2,005 graduate students enrolled at Morgan, and 45% were non-Maryland residents. The largest sources of enrollment outside of Maryland were New York, New Jersey, and Pennsylvania. Almost 10% of the student population was international, including many from countries like Jamaica, Dominican Republic, Nigeria, and Saudi Arabia. As of Fall 2026, the new record number of enrollment is 12,477 students. The university’s enrollment growth is due not only to the growing interest in HBCUs in general, but also to the institution's dedicated recruiting efforts.

== Student life ==
Undergraduate demographics as of fall 2023
Race and ethnicity	Total
Black	74%
Unknown	9%
International student	7%
Hispanic	5%
Two or more races	3%
White	1%
Economic diversity
Low-income (Note: The percentage of students who received an income-based federal Pell grant intended for low-income students.)	54%
Affluent (Note: The percentage of students who are a part of the American middle class at the bare minimum.)	46%

=== Residential life ===
The university offers on and off campus housing options including multiple dining services catering to students of various backgrounds and needs.

University resources and services available for all students include the student center, university gym, food resource center, health center, counseling center, memorial chapel and youth ministry, and career development centers.

=== Greek life, social clubs, and organizations ===
Morgan State University has over 20+ fraternity and sorority chapters including the nine National Pan-Hellenic Council (NPHC) organizations, social fellowships, clubs, student government association (SGA), and free purpose recreation spaces.

=== Athletics ===
Morgan's athletic teams are known as the Bears, and they compete in the Mid-Eastern Athletic Conference (MEAC). Between 1926 and 1928, a young Charles Drew served as Athletic Director. During this time he made great improvements in the school's teams' records. From the 1930s through 1960s, led by coach and then athletic director Edward P. Hurt, Morgan's athletic teams were legendary. More than thirty of its football players were drafted by and played in the NFL and many of its track athletes competed internationally and received world-class status. By the late 1960s most white colleges and universities ended their segregation against black high school students and many top black high school students and athletes started matriculating to schools from which they had previously been barred. While achieving a national goal of desegregation, integration depleted the athletic strength of schools like Morgan State and Grambling State University. For example, the annual contest between Morgan State and Grambling played in New York City in the late 1960s drew more than 60,000 fans. Morgan State's rivals are the Howard University Bison (the matchup is often called the Battle of the Beltway) and the Coppin State Eagles.

==== Basketball ====
In 2009, the Morgan State men's basketball team won the MEAC regular season and tournament championship and qualified for the 2009 NCAA Division I men's basketball tournament. In their first tournament appearance, the 15th-seeded Bears lost to the 2008–09 Oklahoma Sooners men's basketball team Oklahoma Sooners, 82–54, in the first round of the South Regional.

In 2010 the Morgan State men's basketball team again won the MEAC regular season and tournament championship and qualified for the 2010 NCAA Division I men's basketball tournament, again as a 15 seed. Morgan State lost to West Virginia University in the first round by a score of 77–50.

==== Football ====
Morgan State began playing football in 1898, 31 years after the school was founded. The Bears have won three MEAC Championships (1976, 1979 and 2014). Their last Division I-AA/FCS playoffs appearance was in 2014. Fifty-three former Morgan players have gone on to play professional football. Former Morgan Bears Len Ford, Leroy Kelly, Willie Lanier and Rosey Brown are members of the Pro Football Hall of Fame in Canton, Ohio.

==== Lacrosse ====
By 1975 Morgan State became noted for its lacrosse team. Morgan State was the first—and, until the turn of the 21st century, the only—historically black university to field a lacrosse team.

In 2005 students organized a lacrosse club which plays other college's lacrosse clubs, but the team has yet to qualify to become an NCAA-sanctioned team.

==== Wrestling ====
In 2023, Morgan State revived its wrestling program, which had been cut in 1997 due to budget restraints. Kenny Monday was hired as head coach.

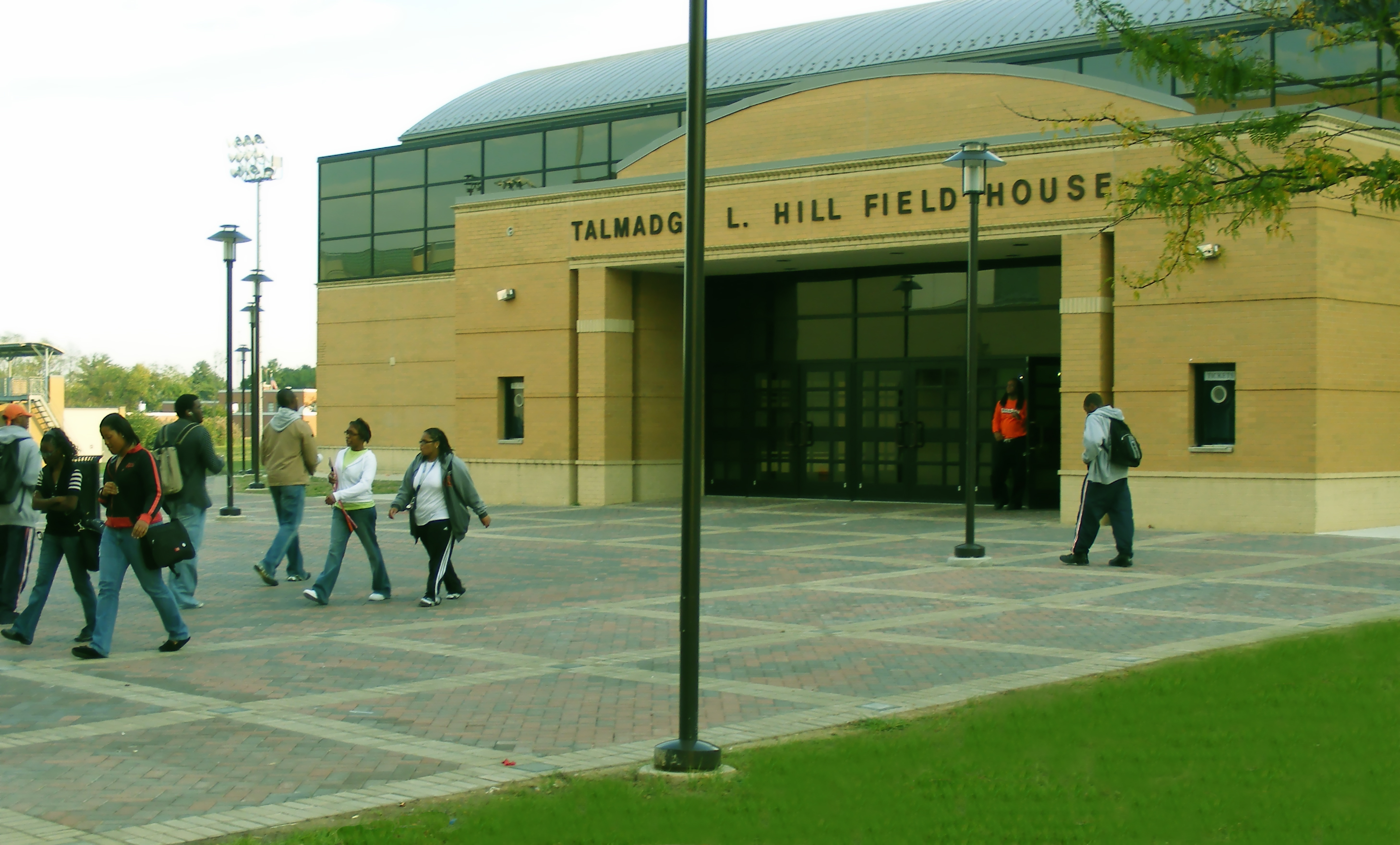
Hill Field House, Morgan's indoor athletic venue

==== Athletic Hall of Fame ====
More than two hundred men and women Morgan State athletes have been inducted into the Morgan State University Hall of Fame including National Football League Hall of Famers Rosey Brown, Leroy Kelly and Willie Lanier, two-time Olympic Gold medalist George Rhoden, and the coach of the Ten Bears lacrosse team Howard "Chip" Silverman.

=== Band ===
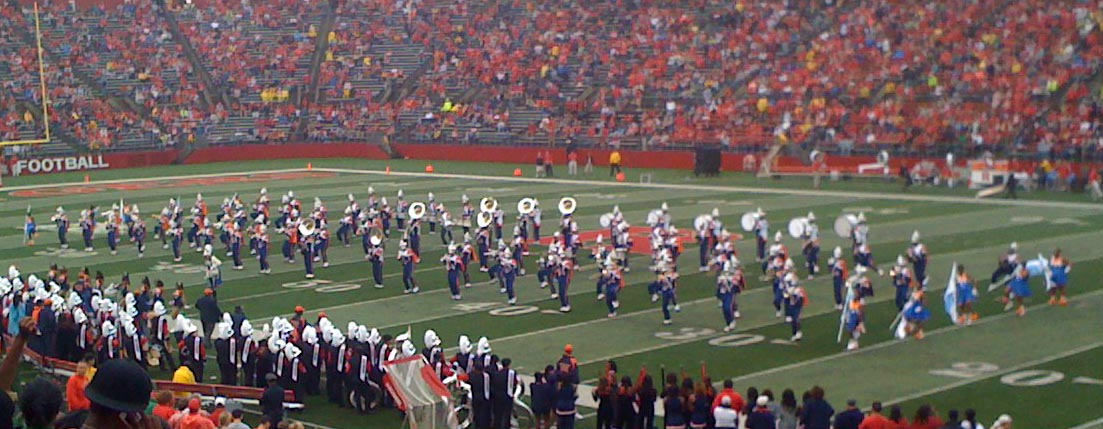
The Morgan State Marching Band performing during halftime at the Rutgers University–Morgan State football game in Piscataway, New Jersey (September 2008)

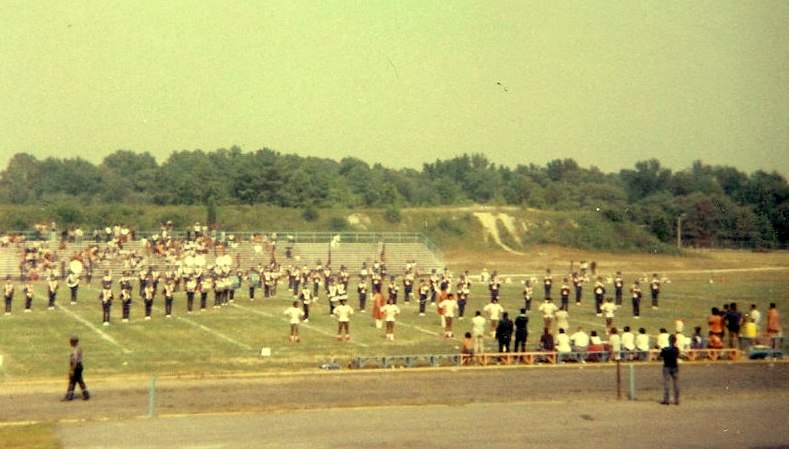
1977 photo of Morgan State University Marching Band

The Morgan State University Band Program consists of six ensembles: the marching band, symphonic band, symphonic winds, pep band, jazz ensemble, and jazz combo. Titled the Magnificent Marching Machine, the marching band has performed at Morgan State football games, NFL games, Presidential Inaugurations, World Series games and in regional and local television appearances.

On November 28, 2019, the Magnificent Marching Machine performed during Macy's Thanksgiving Day Parade in New York City. They also performed at the 80th Anniversary and Commemoration of D-Day in Normandy, France on June 12, 2024.

=== Choir ===
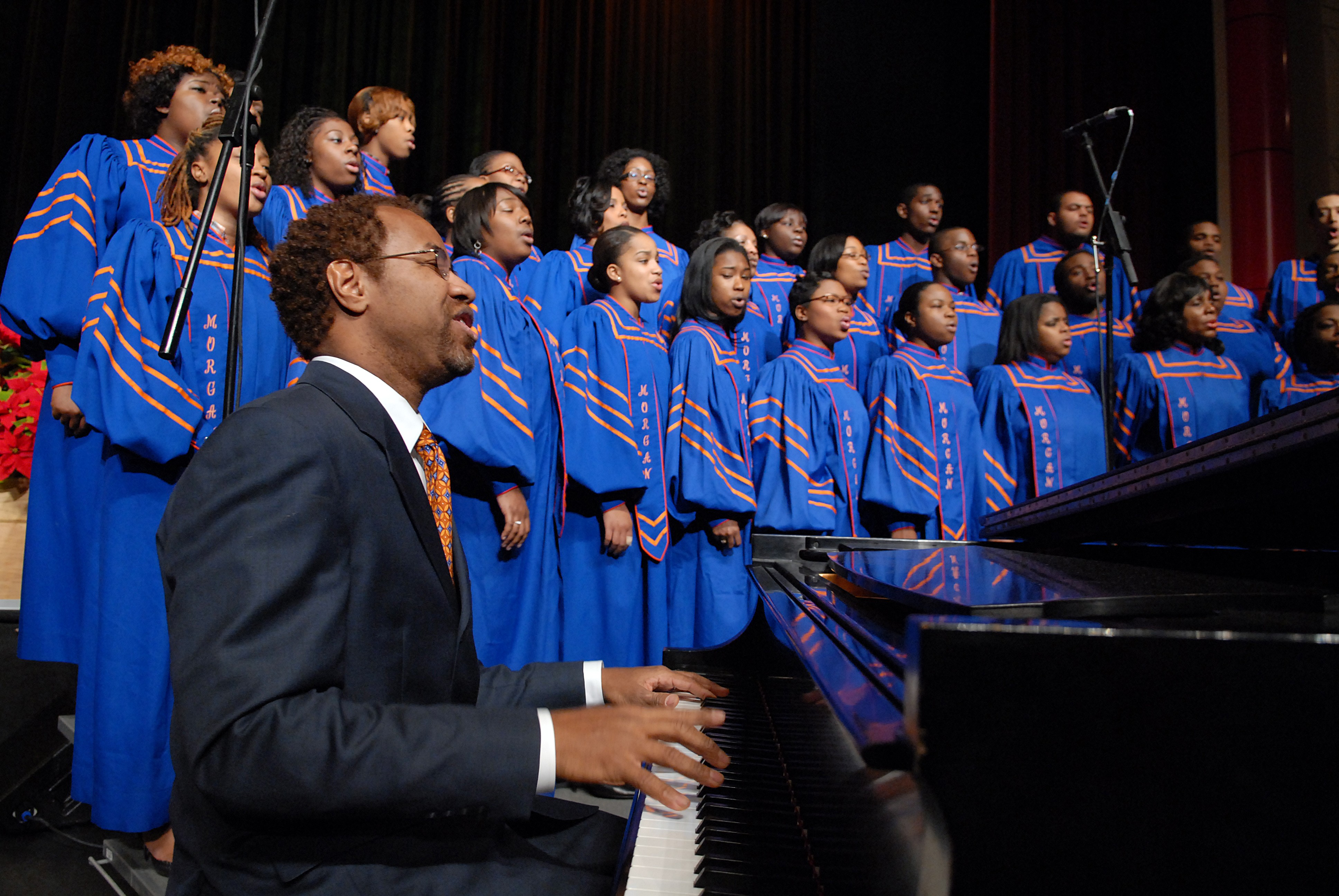
Morgan State University Choir

The Morgan State University Choir has performed for audiences throughout the United States and internationally. Robert Shaw has directed them, together with the Orchestra of St. Lukes and Jessye Norman and others in Carnegie Hall's One Hundredth Birthday Tribute to Marian Anderson. In the 1996-1997 season, the "Silver Anniversary" concert was broadcast throughout the state of Maryland. The concert won an Emmy Award for Maryland Public Television.

During 2011-2012 academic years, the choir had several prominent performances. Since 2017, the Morgan State University choir has toured Cuba, Spain, Portugal, Austria, Slovakia, Germany, England, Scotland, Wales, Peru, Ecuador, and the Galapagos Islands. In December 2021, the choir sang a concert in Hawaii, to commemorate the eightieth anniversary of the bombing of Pearl Harbor.

== Media ==
=== The Spokesman ===
The Spokesman is the university's student-run newspaper.

=== WMUR Baltimore ===
WMUR Baltimore is the student-operated radio station of the School of Global Journalism and Communication and the university.

=== WEAA 88.9 FM ===
WEAA 88.9 is the NPR-affiliated public radio station of Morgan State University, and a service of the university's School of Global Journalism and Communication. It began broadcasting on January 10, 1977, with call letters standing for "We Educate African Americans." Broadcasting since 1977, WEAA 88.9 operates independently and attracts support from public donors, underwriters, and grant-makers.

=== BEAR-TV ===
BEAR-TV Network is Morgan State University's TV network offering regular programming in local and campus news and sports among other featured productions.

== Notable alumni and faculty ==
=== Alumni ===
Alumni of Morgan State University have achieved notability in the fields of athletics, science, government, law, the arts, and the military including four members of the NFL Football Hall of Fame (Willie Lanier, Roosevelt Brown, Leroy Kelly, and Len Ford); Black Enterprise Magazine publisher Earl Graves; Clarence Dunnaville, lawyer and civil rights activist; and nearly a dozen U.S. Army generals, including Lieutenant General William "Kip" Ward, the first commanding officer of the United States Africa Command. The New York Times sports columnist William C. Rhoden, playwright, TV producer, and entrepreneur David E. Talbert, and American-Israeli Olympic sprinter Donald Sanford are also alumni. Civil rights activist and music critic for the Baltimore Afro-American newspaper Adah Jenkins graduated from Morgan State, as did scientist and inventor Valerie Thomas.

=== Faculty ===
Former faculty member Ernest Lyon was a United States ambassador to Liberia and the founder of the Maryland Industrial and Agricultural Institute for Colored Youths. Noted African American historian and pioneering scholar Dr. Benjamin A. Quarles served on its faculty for many decades. Physician-scientist Charles R. Drew, known for his work on blood transfusion, was Morgan College's first athletic director. African-American historian Rosalyn Terborg-Penn wrote on women's suffrage. Flora E. Strout, Morgan College teacher and principal, wrote the school's anthem.

Notable faculty currently teaching at Morgan State University include bestselling author and filmmaker MK Asante, and scholar Raymond Winbush.
