= Earl S. Richardson =

American academic (1943–2025)

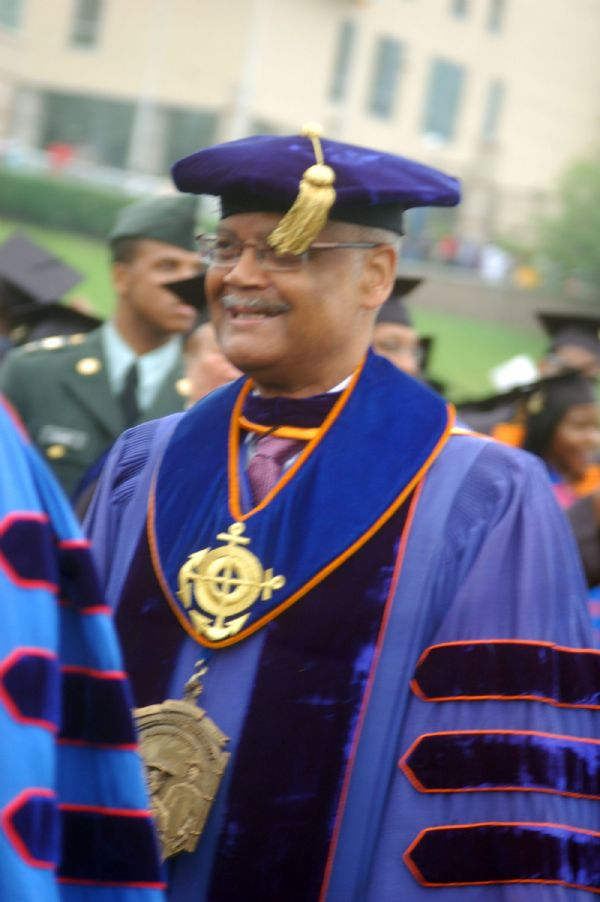
- Richardson in 2009

9th President of Morgan State University
- In office November 1, 1984 – June 30, 2010
- Preceded by: Andrew Billingsley
- Succeeded by: David Wilson

Personal details
- Born: Earl Stanford Richardson; September 25, 1943 Westover, Maryland, U.S.
- Died: September 11, 2025 (aged 81)
- Education: Maryland State College; University of Pennsylvania
- Profession: College administrator, academic

Earl Stanford Richardson (September 25, 1943 – September 11, 2025) was an American academic who served as the ninth president of Morgan State University from 1984 to 2010. Prior to serving as the president of Morgan State University, Richardson served as Assistant to the president of the University System of Maryland, and Executive Assistant to the Chancellor, Director of Career Planning and Placement and Acting Director of Admissions and Registration at the University of Maryland Eastern Shore.

== Early life and early career ==
Richarson was born on September 25, 1943, in Westover, Maryland, an unincorporated community in Somerset County on the Eastern Shore of Maryland. He earned a Bachelor of Arts degree from Maryland State College. Afterward, he earned a Master of Science degree and a Doctor of Education degree from the University of Pennsylvania. Richardson also served in the United States Air Force from 1965 to 1969.

Richardson became a fellow at the Ford Foundation and the W. K. Kellogg Foundation where he conducted extensive research on critical problems in higher education relevant to racial autonomy, desegregation and integration. He wrote several articles on the implications of proposals to merge historically Black institutions with white institutions and on inter-institutional cooperation in higher education.

== President of Morgan State University ==
Richardson served as President of Morgan State University from November 1, 1984, to June 6, 2010. During this period, the University went through a rebirth throughout the campus. This time period is considered to be a renaissance period and the third "Era of Progress" for the University. Richardson's vision was to create an environment for students to receive the best education possible. A fundamental part of that vision was providing Morgan students a quality academic information resource center, strengthening academic programs, improving fiscal management, stabilizing student enrollment, and renovating the University's buildings and infrastructure.

During his presidency, the University added modern, state-of-the-art facilities resulting from over $200 million in capital improvements. Additionally, upgrades included the renovation and construction of classroom and research buildings, residence halls and other auxiliary buildings, totaling nearly $400 million. The expansion of the campus included three adjacent complexes (Montebello Complex, the Pentridge Apartments, and a portion of the Northwood Shopping Center) and a satellite Estuarine Research Center in Southern Maryland. The construction of a new fine arts center (the Carl J. Murphy Fine Arts Center) was also undertaken on the southern portion of the campus.

Moreover, the size of the student body increased by over 40% under his tenure. As the student body continued to grow, the academic achievements of the student body also increased (as measured by the high school GPA and SAT scores). Morgan also experienced growth in its academic programs, adding Bachelor's degree programs in civil, electrical and industrial engineering, hospitality management and finance. Also, adding Master's degrees and Doctorate degrees in engineering, history, business and public health.

During Richardson's tenure, Morgan led Maryland colleges and universities in the overall production of African American baccalaureates, and in the number of undergraduates in mathematics, science and engineering. Thirty-six percent of the graduates pursued advance study compared to the State average of twenty-six percent.

== Later life and death ==
Richardson kept active in civic and community organizations. He served as a member of LifeBridge Health, the National Institutes of Health, the American Council on Education’s Commission on International Education, President's Board of Advisors on HBCUs. He also served as a member of the Boards of the Baltimore Symphony Orchestra and the Alvin Ailey Dance Theater Foundation of Maryland.

Richardson received both a Distinguished Alumni Award and an honorary doctorate of laws from the University of Maryland Eastern Shore.

Richardson died on September 11, 2025, at the age of 81.
