= Andrew Billingsley =

American academic (born 1926)

8th President of Morgan State University
- In office July 31, 1975 – February 27, 1984
- Preceded by: King Virgil Cheek
- Succeeded by: Earl S. Richardson

Personal details
- Born: Andrew Billingsley; March 20, 1926 (age 100) Marion, Alabama
- Spouse: Amy Loretta Tate
- Children: 2
- Education: Grinnell College (A.B.); Boston University (M.S.); Brandeis University (Ph.D.)
- Profession: Sociologist; University President

Andrew Billingsley (born March 20, 1926) is an American sociologist, author, lecturer, and college professor who served as the eighth president of Morgan State University from 1975 to 1984.

== Biography ==
Billingsley was born on March 20, 1926, in Marion, Alabama, the son of Silas and Lucy Billingsley. He served in the United States Army during World War II from 1944 to 1946. After his military service, he obtained his A.B. degree from Hampton Industrial University in 1951. Thereafter, he obtained his M.S. degree from Boston University in 1956, and his Ph.D. from Brandeis University in 1964. While at Brandeis University, Billingsley met his future wife, Amy Loretta Tate, who was a fellow student. They were married in 1961 and had two children.

Billingsley has been a sociology and African-American/Africana studies at many colleges and universities, including Howard University, University of California, Berkeley, University of Maryland, College Park, and the University of South Carolina. Billingsley wrote or co-authored books, research papers, and academic publications.

== Publications ==
- Andrew Billingsley, Scholar and Institution Builder: Essays and Tributes (2021: Black Classic Press, Maryland)
- Black Families and the Struggle for Survival (1974: Friendship Press, New York)
- Child Development and Family Life in the Black Community (1974: Department of Health, Education, and Welfare, Washington, D.C.)
- Climbing Jacob's Ladder: The Enduring Legacy of African-American Families (1992: Simon and Schuster, New York)
- The Evolution of the Black Family (1976: National Urban League, New York)
- Illegitimacy: Changing Services for Changing Times (1970: National Council on Illegitimacy, New York)
- Mighty like a River: The Black Church and Social Reform (1999: Oxford University Press, New York)
- The Role of the Social Worker in a Child Protective Agency: a Comparative Analysis (1964: Society for the Prevention of Cruelty to Children, Boston)
- The Social Worker in a Child Protective Agency New York;(1965: National Association of Social Workers, New York)
- Yearning to Breathe Free: Robert Smalls of South Carolina and His Families (2007: University of South Carolina Press, 2007)

As joint-publications:

- Black Families in White America (1968: Prentice-Hall, New Jersey)
- Children of the Storm: Black Children and American Child Welfare (1972: Harcourt, New York)
- Research on African-American Families: a Holistic Perspective (1989: Trotter Institute, University of Massachusetts, Boston)
- Studies in Child Protective Services: Final Report of a Project Supported by the Children’s Bureau (1969: U.S. Department of Health, Education, and Welfare, Washington, D.C.)

As a co-editor:

- Black Colleges and Public Policy (1986: Follett Press, Chicago)
- Blacks on White Campuses: Whites on Black Campuses (1986: Follett, Chicago)
- Inside Black Colleges and Universities (1986: Follett, Chicago)
