= Martin David Jenkins =

American academic

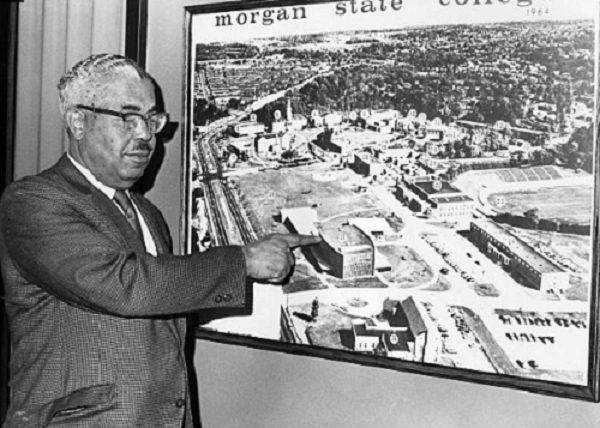

6th President of Morgan State College
- In office 1948–1970
- Preceded by: Dwight O.W. Holmes
- Succeeded by: King Virgil Cheek

Personal details
- Born: September 4, 1904 Terre Haute, Indiana
- Died: June 9, 1978 (aged 73) Washington, D.C.
- Spouse: Elizabeth Lacy
- Education: Howard University; Indiana State University; Northwestern University
- Profession: Education

Martin David Jenkins (September 4, 1904 – June 9, 1978) was an American educator and researcher known for his work challenging mainstream theories of African American race and intelligence.

== Early life ==
Martin Jenkins was born to David and Josephine Jenkins in Terre Haute, Indiana. Jenkins was educated in racially segregated public schools until his high school years when he attended the racially integrated Wiley High School. While attending Wiley, he was the captain of the track team and set Vigo County record for the 50-yard (5.6 seconds), 100-yd (10.2 sec) and 220-yd (24.0 sec) dashes. He graduated from Wiiley in 1921.

== Personal life ==
In September 1927, Jenkins married Elizabeth Lacy.

== Academic career ==
Jenkins graduated from Howard University with Bachelor of Arts in mathematics in 1925. Between 1925 and 1930, he worked with his father's firm, David Jenkins and Son, as a highway bridge contractor. Concurrently, he attended Indiana State College (now Indiana State University) and earned an associate degree in teacher education. During a brief interim, Jenkins taught at Virginia State College. In 1932, he was awarded a graduate school fellowship to Northwestern University, the first of its kind to be awarded to a Black American at the institution. In 1933, he received his Master's degree and, in 1935 earned his Ph.D. in Education. While earning his doctorate, he studied under Prof. Paul A. Witty and wrote his dissertation called "A Socio-Psychological Study of Negro Children of Superior Intelligence." Jenkins' dissertation, and his subsequent research, were foundational to the field of educational psychology. Jenkins' work discussed Intelligence Quotient (IQ) testing and worked to disprove the prevailing consensus that blacks, through a measurement of their IQ, were less intelligent than whites.

Between 1935 and 1937, Jenkins worked as register and professor of education at North Carolina Agriculture and Technical College (now University). In 1938, he worked at Cheyney State Teachers College as Dean of Instruction. From 1938 to 1948, Jenkins worked at his alma mater, Howard University, as professor of education. Then, in 1948, Jenkins accepted the position as president of Morgan State College (now University) in Maryland. While serving as president during the Civil Rights era, he felt that the institution should remain apolitical and not support the civil rights movement, a decision many students disagreed with and spoke out against. In 1970, he left Morgan State and worked as the Director of the Office of Urban Affairs for the American Council on Education until 1974. During this period, he also worked as a consultant in higher education and as a diplomate of the American Board of Examiners in Clinical Psychology.

During his career, Jenkins published over 80 scholarly articles and monographs and lectured worldwide on his intelligence testing research with aid from the U.S. State Department.

== Notable scholarship ==
Jenkins premier scholarship, was his 1935 doctoral dissertation published in "A Socio-Psychological Study of Negro Children of Superior Intelligence," was among the first to focus on black children of superior intelligence. Jenkins researched black children of "superior intelligence" in grades 3-8 living in Chicago, Illinois. Jenkins findings contradicted prevailing intelligence research that suggested that black children of high intelligences were rare and instead asserted that highly intelligent black children existed at when they were given the opportunity for educational and cultural development. Jenkins work rejected the notion that blacks had a genetic predisposition for lower intelligences and, in fact, showed that intelligence levels among blacks were as high as they were among whites. Jenkins showed that being black was not a limiting factor for one's intelligence, as previous research had claimed.

Working with his mentor Witty, Jenkins co-authored "The Case of 'B'—A Gifted Negro Girl," a descriptive case study that observed a nine-year-old girl from Chicago whose Stanford-Binet IQ score measured at 187. Jenkins and Witty described her developmental history, academic success, interests, friends and home life. They described "B" as a child who provided rapid responses to questions, made high-level associations, yet was not satisfied with her own performance. This study further provided the groundwork for research that examined blacks of significantly high intelligence.

In 1939, Jenkins published "The Mental Ability of the American Negro," a systematic review article that rejected inter-race, or white and black comparison, analysis for understanding the intelligence capabilities of blacks. Jenkins showed that there is significant overlap between black and white intelligence tests and that intra-group differences were much larger than inter-group differences. This work highlighted that more blacks and whites shared intelligence test scored rather than the majority blacks scoring lower than whites.

== Awards ==
Jenkins was bestowed as Knight by the Liberian Government of the Liberian Humane Order of African Redemption. He received a Commendation for Model Cities activities by the Department of Health, Education and Welfare and Housing and Urban Development. He was also awarded the Andrew White Medal from Loyola College and the Department of the Army Outstanding Civilian Service Medal.

Jenkins was awarded an honorary doctorates degree by the University of Liberia, Delaware State College, Howard University, Indiana State University, Johns Hopkins University, Lincoln University and Morgan State College.

In 1974, Morgan State College dedicated the Martin David Jenkins Behavior Science Center in Jenkins' honor.

== Publications ==
- A Socio-Psychological Study of Negro Children of Superior Intelligence
- The Case of "B"—A Gifted Negro Girl
- The Mental Ability of the American Negro
- Current Trends in Higher Education: Democratic Government in Negro Colleges
- Enrollment in Institutions of Higher Education of Negroes, 1940–1941
- Case Studies of Negro Children of Binet IQ 160 and Above
- A Listing of the Significant Programs in Institutions of Higher Education of Negroes
- Enrollment in Institutions of Higher Education for Negroes, 1944-1945
- Enrollment in Institutions of Higher Education for Negroes 1946-47
- Graduate Work in Negro Institutions of Higher Education
- The Availability of Higher Education for Negroes in the Southern States
- The Upper Limit of Ability among American Negroes
- Intellectually Superior Negro Youth: Problems and Needs
- Problems Incident to Racial Integration and some Suggested Approaches to these Problems
- The Future of the Desegregated Negro College Education: A Critical Summary
