= Michael G. Spencer =

American computer scientist

- Born: March 9, 1952 (age 74); Detroit, Michigan
- Education: Cornell University, B.S., M.Eng., and Ph.D.
- Awards: Quality Education for Minorities Giants of Science Award 1996; Distinguished Visiting Scientist Appointment (Jet Propulsion Laboratories) 1990; Allen Berman Research Publication Award (Naval Research Laboratory) 1986; Presidential Young Investigator Award (National Science Foundation) 1985
- Website: https://people.ece.cornell.edu/spencer/

Michael G. Spencer is a computer scientist, electrical engineer, and professor at Morgan State University's Clarence M. Mitchell Jr. School of Engineering in Baltimore. His research and studies is concentrated on semiconductors, microwave devices, and solar cells.

== Education and early life ==
Spencer was born in Detroit, Michigan on March 9, 1952. His family members consisted of teachers, who had culturally rich backgrounds. Spencer grew up in Washington, D.C., and traveled to Ithaca, New York to study at Cornell University.

Spencer became well involved with the electrical engineering industry. He was interested in computer engineering because he wanted to expand his knowledge and gain experience of computer engineering.

Spencer earned a Bachelor of Science degree in 1974 and a Master of Science degree in electrical engineering from Cornell University in 1975. Spencer later returned to Cornell University in 1981 and was one of the first of two black men to earn a doctoral degree in electrical engineering.

== Career ==
From 1974 to 1977 Spencer worked at Bell Labs alongside the world's top scientists and innovators. He began as an assistant professor in 1984 at Howard University. Spencer and Gary L. Harris founded the Materials Science Center of Excellence (formerly known as the Rockwell Solid State electrics Laboratory) in 1984 at Howard University at the invitation of Eugene DeLoatch. He became a 'full professor' in 1990 and concluded his career at Howard in 1999 as the David and Lucile Packard Chaired Professor of Materials Science. At Howard University, he was awarded a Young Investigator award from the National Science Foundation and named Presidential Scholar.

Spencer then taught as a professor of electrical engineering at Cornell University from 1999 to 2002. He progressed to 'Associate Dean of Research and Graduate Studies' at the College of Engineering from 2002 to 2008. At Bandgap Laboratory he directed research on 'semiconductors'- advancing his research. He also served as director of the Bandgap laboratory and of the National Science Foundation (NSF) Nano-Fabrication Network. In 2008, Spencer co-founded the company 'Wavetronix' to build low-power, long-life beta voltaic batteries.

Spencer became the dean of the Clarence M. Mitchell Jr. School of Engineering at Morgan State University in Baltimore on January 4, 2017. He is the second dean in the school's history, succeeding Eugene M. Deloatch, and a professor of electrical and computer engineering, with a focus on semiconductors, microwave devices, and solar cells.

Spencer has more than 160 publications and 20 patents in the fields of compound semiconductors, graphene, power conversion, microwave devices, and solar cell technology.

He was also a committee member for the American Vacuum Society, the International Conference on Silicon Carbide and Related Materials, the Electronic Materials Conferences Organizing Committee, and the Compound Semiconductor Symposium Organizing Committee.

== Research ==
Spencer's biggest area of his research was on compound semiconductors. A semiconductor is a material that is electrically conductive and can act as an insulator, such as silicon or germanium. In computer engineering these materials are useful for keeping and stopping an electrical current in a computer chip at a compact size. Spencer dedicated a chunk of his research behind compound semiconductors.

Compound semiconductors are semiconductors that are made from two elements or more. Unlike semiconductors, which are made from a single element such as silicon, compound semiconductors typically consists of GaAs (Gallium Arsenide), GaN (Gallium Nitride), SiC (Silicon Carbide), etc. Compound semiconductors give a vast amount of benefits over regular semiconductors.

Spencer analyzed the correlation between the performance of a device with the material(s) being used. Spencer's more recent work has been centered around graphene and wide-band gap materials. The wider the band gap in a compound semiconductor, the higher the voltage, thermal stability, and efficiency. Graphene semiconductors are considered to have the potential to outperform regular silicon based semiconductors in some areas, such as higher conductivity, speed, and thermal capabilities. Although it's stated that it'll likely not become a complete replacement to silicon, it is considered to have promising areas of strength. Spencer's research has contributed to the application of these materials to things like microwave devices, power conversion devices, betavoltaic batteries, and solar cells.

== Selected publications ==
Publications include:

- "Progress, Challenges, and Opportunities in Two-Dimensional Materials Beyond Graphene". ACS Nano. 7 (4): 2898–2926. doi:10.1021/nn400280c. ISSN 1936-0851.
- "Oriented 2D Covalent Organic Framework Thin Films on Single-Layer Graphene". Science. 332 (6026): 228–231. doi:10.1126/science.1202747. ISSN 0036-8075.
- "Measurement of ultrafast carrier dynamics in epitaxial graphene".(2008). Applied Physics Letters. 92 (4).
- "Ultrafast Optical-Pump Terahertz-Probe Spectroscopy of the Carrier Relaxation and Recombination Dynamics in Epitaxial Graphene".(2008-12-10).Nano Letters. 8 (12): 4248–4251. doi:10.1021/nl8019399. ISSN 1530-6984.

== Awards and nominations ==
Awards and nominations include:

- Quality Education for Minorities Giants of Science Award 1996
- Featured in PBS TV Series Breakthrough: Engineering From the Inside Out aired April 1996
- Distinguished Visiting Scientist Appointment (Jet Propulsion Laboratories) 1990
- Allen Berman Research Publication Award (Naval Research Laboratory) 1986
- Presidential Young Investigator Award (National Science Foundation) 1985
