= National Register of Historic Places listings in East and Northeast Baltimore =

National Register of Historic Places listings in the city of Baltimore, Maryland

This list covers some of the properties in the independent city of Baltimore, but not those in the county of Baltimore surrounding the city. The county does not include the city, which is an independent county-equivalent.

This National Park Service list is complete through NPS recent listings posted June 19, 2026.

== Current listings ==
	Name on the Register	Image	Date listed	Location	District	Description
1	American Brewery	American Brewery	May 9, 1973 (#73002179)	1701 N. Gay St. 39°18′34″N 76°35′06″W	East	
2	Arcadia-Beverly Hills Historic District	Arcadia-Beverly Hills Historic District	December 23, 2004 (#04001375)	Moravia Rd.-Belair Rd.-Herring Run Park-Harford Rd. 39°20′13″N 76°34′06″W	Northeast	
3	Baltimore American Indian Center and Heritage Museum	Baltimore American Indian Center and Heritage Museum	September 23, 2025 (#100012255)	113 S. Broadway; 39°17′24″N 76°35′37″W	East	
4	Baltimore City College	Baltimore City College	June 30, 2003 (#03000573)	3320 The Alameda; 39°19′17″N 76°35′46″W	Northeast	
5	Baltimore East/South Clifton Park Historic District	Baltimore East/South Clifton Park Historic District	December 27, 2002 (#02001611)	Roughly bounded by Clifton Park, N. Broadway, E. Chase St., and N. Rose St. 39°18′33″N 76°35′22″W	East	
6	Barclay-East Baltimore-Midway Historic District	Barclay-East Baltimore-Midway Historic District	March 1, 2024 (#100009978)	Bound by Barclay St., E. North Ave., Harford Ave., E. 25th St. 39°18′58″N 76°36′24″W		
7	Berea-Biddle Street Historic District		December 29, 2014 (#14001092)	N. Rose, & Federal Sts., Edison Hwy., PCRR. 39°18′18″N 76°34′43″W	East	
8	Bohemian National Cemetery	Bohemian National Cemetery	November 10, 2010 (#10000910)	1300 Horners Lane; 39°18′28″N 76°33′13″W	East	
9	Brewers Hill Historic District	Brewers Hill Historic District	December 22, 2014 (#14001070)	Roughly bounded by Eastern Ave., S. Conkling, S. Haven & Dillon Sts. 39°17′02″N 76°33′53″W	East	
10	Clifton Park	Clifton Park	September 12, 2007 (#07000941)	Bounded by Hartford Rd., Erdman Ave., Clifton Park Terrace, the Baltimore Belt Line, and Sinclair Ln. 39°19′15″N 76°34′58″W	East	
11	Clifton Park Valve House	Clifton Park Valve House	February 18, 1971 (#71001034)	2801 Harford Rd. 39°19′09″N 76°35′13″W	Northeast	
12	Clifton School	Clifton School	December 16, 1982 (#82001583)	2670 Kennedy Ave. 39°19′18″N 76°35′46″W	Northeast	
13	Coca-Cola Bottling Company of Baltimore Building	Coca-Cola Bottling Company of Baltimore Building	October 23, 2013 (#13000847)	2525 Kirk Ave. 39°19′08″N 76°36′01″W	East	
14	Coldstream Homestead Montebello Historic District	Coldstream Homestead Montebello Historic District	October 23, 2013 (#13000848)	Roughly bounded by The Alameda, Kennedy & Kirk Aves., Harford Rd., E. 32nd & E. 33rd Sts. 39°19′19″N 76°35′36″W	East	
15	Paul Laurence Dunbar School Complex	Paul Laurence Dunbar School Complex	November 4, 2024 (#100010938)	500 North Caroline Street and 540 North Caroline Street; 39°17′48″N 76°35′51″W		
16	East Monument Historic District	East Monument Historic District	December 8, 2009 (#09001061)	N. Washington St. on the west, an Amtrak rail line on the north to East St., south to Monument, and east to Highland Ave. 39°18′02″N 76°34′48″W	Northeast	
17	Engine House No. 6	Engine House No. 6	June 18, 1973 (#73002185)	416 N. Gay St. 39°17′43″N 76°36′20″W	East	
18	Friends Burial Ground	Friends Burial Ground	January 12, 2005 (#04001471)	2506 Harford Rd. 39°19′05″N 76°35′42″W	Northeast	
19	Green Mount Cemetery	Green Mount Cemetery	April 2, 1980 (#80001786)	Bounded by North and Greenmount Aves. and Ensor and Hoffman Sts. 39°18′31″N 76°36′24″W	East	
20	Gompers School	Gompers School	June 20, 1985 (#85001272)	1701 E. North Ave. 39°18′43″N 76°35′41″W	East	
21	L. Grief and Bro., Inc. Manufactory	L. Grief and Bro., Inc. Manufactory	December 19, 2007 (#07001284)	901 N. Milton Ave. 39°18′05″N 76°34′57″W	East	
22	Gunther Brewing Company	Gunther Brewing Company	December 26, 2002 (#02001607)	1200, 1211, and 1301 S. Conkling St., 3601 and 3701 O'Donnell St., the eastern side of S. Conkling St., and the rear eastern side of S. Conkling St. 39°16′46″N 76°34′00″W	East	
23	Industrial Building	Industrial Building	March 10, 1980 (#80001788)	501 E. Preston St. 39°18′16″N 76°36′31″W	East	
24	Lauraville Historic District	Lauraville Historic District	December 28, 2001 (#01001371)	Roughly bounded by Harford Rd., Herring Run Creek, Cold Spring Ln., Charlton Ave., Halcyon Ave., Grindon Rd., and Echodale Ave. 39°20′44″N 76°34′23″W	Northeast	
25	Laurel Cemetery		June 23, 2026 (#100013158)	2401 Belair Rd. 39°19′07″N 76°34′37″W	Northeast	
26	Mayfield Historic District	Mayfield Historic District	January 6, 2004 (#03001371)	Lake Montebello Rd.-Chesterfield Ave.,-Crossland Ave.-Erdman Ave. 39°19′49″N 76°34′48″W	Northeast	
27	McDonogh Place Historic District	McDonogh Place Historic District	April 28, 2015 (#15000172)	N. Broadway, E. Eager, McDonogh & E. Chase Sts. 39°18′10″N 76°35′39″W	East	
28	Morgan Park Historic District	Morgan Park Historic District	March 9, 2020 (#100004808)	Roughly bounded by Herring Run Stream, East Cold Spring Lane and Charlton Ave. 39°20′51″N 76°34′43″W		
29	Morgan State University Memorial Chapel		May 21, 2018 (#100002500)	4307 Hillen Rd; 39°20′35″N 76°35′12″W		
30	North Central Historic District	North Central Historic District	December 27, 2002 (#02001606)	Roughly bounded by North Ave., Greenmount Ave., Falls Rd., and Interstate 83; 39°18′34″N 76°36′48″W	East	
31	Null House	Null House	January 27, 1983 (#83002936)	1037 Hillen St. 39°17′46″N 76°36′22″W	East	
32	Oak Street Garage	Oak Street Garage	October 23, 2013 (#13000849)	2600 N. Howard St. 39°19′10″N 76°37′14″W	East	
33	Old East Baltimore Historic District	Old East Baltimore Historic District	December 27, 2006 (#06001175)	Generally bounded by Jones Falls, Greenmount Cemetery, North Ave., Broadway, and Madison, Ashland and Eager Sts. 39°18′19″N 76°36′16″W	East	
34	Old Hamilton Library	Old Hamilton Library	September 25, 2012 (#12000817)	3006 Hamilton Ave. 39°21′06″N 76°33′39″W	Northeast	
35	Old Town Savings Bank	Old Town Savings Bank	May 9, 1996 (#96000470)	353 N. Gay St. 39°17′40″N 76°36′24″W	East	part of the Cast Iron Architecture of Baltimore MPS
36	Public School No. 37	Public School No. 37	September 25, 1979 (#79001112)	E. Biddle St. and N. Patterson Park Ave. 39°18′16″N 76°35′08″W	East	
37	Public School No. 99	Public School No. 99	September 25, 1979 (#79001113)	E. North Ave. and N. Washington St. 39°18′46″N 76°35′25″W	East	
38	Public School No. 109		September 25, 1979 (#79001110)	N. Broadway and Ashland Ave. 39°18′01″N 76°35′38″W	East	
39	Rowhouses at 303-327 East North Avenue	Rowhouses at 303-327 East North Avenue	September 13, 1984 (#84001351)	303-327 E. North Ave. 39°18′40″N 76°36′43″W	East	
40	St. James the Less Roman Catholic Church	St. James the Less Roman Catholic Church	March 15, 1982 (#82004750)	Aisquith St. at Eager St. 39°18′04″N 76°36′08″W	East	
41	St. John the Evangelist Roman Catholic Church	St. John the Evangelist Roman Catholic Church	March 15, 1982 (#82004751)	901 E. Eager St. 39°18′05″N 76°36′17″W	East	
42	Hans Schuler Studio and Residence	Hans Schuler Studio and Residence	September 27, 1985 (#85002510)	5 East Lafayette Ave. 39°18′34″N 76°36′57″W	East	
43	Sydenham Hospital for Communicable Diseases	Sydenham Hospital for Communicable Diseases	October 30, 1998 (#98001294)	Argonne Dr., west of Herring Rd. 39°20′16″N 76°34′52″W	Northeast	
44	Taylor's Chapel	Taylor's Chapel	July 28, 1983 (#83002940)	6001 Hillen Rd., Mount Pleasant Park; 39°21′46″N 76°34′40″W	Northeast	
45	Upper Fells Point Historic District	Upper Fells Point Historic District	December 20, 2007 (#07001034)	Roughly bounded by E. Baltimore St., S. Chapel St., E. Pratt St., S. Patterson Park Ave., and S. Chester, Gough, and S. Bethel Sts. 39°17′19″N 76°35′16″W	East	

== See also ==
- National Register of Historic Places listings in Maryland
