= Clifton =

Clifton may refer to:

== People ==
- Clifton (surname)
- Clifton (given name)

== Places ==
=== Australia ===
- Clifton, Queensland, a town
  - Shire of Clifton
- Clifton, New South Wales, a suburb of Wollongong
- Clifton, Western Australia

=== Canada ===
- Clifton, Nova Scotia, a rural community
- Clifton, a former name of New London, Prince Edward Island
- Clifton, a former name of Niagara Falls

=== New Zealand ===
- Clifton, Christchurch, a suburb
- Clifton, Hawke's Bay
- Clifton, Invercargill, a suburb
- Clifton, Auckland, the home of Josiah Firth and a Category 1 Heritage New Zealand listed building

=== Pakistan ===
- Clifton, Karachi, a neighborhood
- Clifton Beach, Karachi
- Clifton Cantonment, Karachi

=== United Kingdom ===
- Clifton, Bedfordshire
- Clifton, Bristol, a suburb
- Clifton, Cumbria, village near Penrith
- Great Clifton, Cumbria
- Little Clifton, Cumbria
- Clifton, Derbyshire
- Clifton, Devon, a hamlet in East Down, Devon
- Clifton, Doncaster, village in the borough of Doncaster, South Yorkshire
- Clifton, Greater Manchester, in the City of Salford
- Clifton, Lancashire, village west of Preston
- Clifton, Northumberland, a hamlet
- Clifton, Nottinghamshire, near Nottingham
- North Clifton, Nottinghamshire
- South Clifton, Nottinghamshire
- Clifton, Harrogate, North Yorkshire
- Clifton, York, a suburb
  - Clifton Without
- Clifton-on-Yore, a civil parish in North Yorkshire
- Clifton, Oxfordshire, a hamlet
- Clifton Hampden, Oxfordshire
- Clifton, Rotherham, a suburb
- Clifton, West Yorkshire
- Clifton, Worcestershire
- Clifton upon Teme, Worcestershire
- Clifton, a mining community near Tyndrum in Scotland

=== United States ===
- Clifton, Arizona, a town
- Clifton, former name of Del Rey, California
- Clifton, former name of Last Chance, California
- Clifton, Colorado, a census-designated place
- Clifton, Idaho, a small city
- Clifton, Illinois, a village
- Clifton, Indiana, an unincorporated community
- Clifton, Kansas, a city
- Clifton, Louisiana, an unincorporated community
- Clifton, Louisville, Kentucky, a neighborhood east of downtown Louisville
- Clifton, Maine, a town
- Clifton, Massachusetts
- Clifton, Michigan, a ghost town
- Clifton, Nevada, a ghost town
- Clifton Township, Lyon County, Minnesota
- Clifton Township, Traverse County, Minnesota
- Clifton, Oregon County, Missouri, an unincorporated community
- Clifton, Schuyler County, Missouri, an unincorporated community
- Clifton City, Missouri, an unincorporated community
- Clifton, New Jersey, a city
- Clifton, New York, a town
- Clifton, Staten Island, New York
- Clifton, North Carolina, an unincorporated community
- Clifton, Ohio, a village
- Clifton, Cincinnati, Ohio, a neighborhood in Cincinnati
- Clifton, Clatsop County, Oregon
- Clifton, Hood River County, Oregon
- Clifton Township, Lackawanna County, Pennsylvania
- Clifton, Tennessee, a city
- Clifton, Texas, a city
- Clifton, Virginia, a town
- Clifton, Grant County, Wisconsin, a town
- Clifton, Monroe County, Wisconsin, a town
- Clifton, Pierce County, Wisconsin, a town
- Clifton (community), Wisconsin, an unincorporated community

==== Historic sites ====
- Clifton (Davenport, Iowa)
- Clifton (Clarksville, Maryland)
- Clifton (Ednor, Maryland)
- Clifton (Roslyn Harbor, New York)
- Clifton (Hamilton, Virginia)
- Clifton (Kilmarnock, Virginia)
- Clifton (Lexington, Virginia)
- Clifton (Rixeyville, Virginia)
- Clifton (Shadwell, Virginia)

=== Other countries ===
- Clifton, County Cavan, Ireland
- Clifton, Cape Town, South Africa, a suburb
- Clifton, Union Island, Saint Vincent and the Grenadines

== Transportation ==
- Clifton (NJT station), a New Jersey Transit train station
- Clifton (Staten Island Railway station), a Staten Island Railway station
- SS Clifton, a steamship that sank with all hands in 1924
- Clifton, a New Zealand Company chartered sailing ship that bought immigrants to Wellington, New Zealand, in 1842
- USS Clifton (1861), a side-wheel gunboat of the American Civil War
- USS Clifton (IX-184), a station tanker which served from 1945–1946

== Other uses ==
- Clifton (comics), a Franco-Belgian comics series
- USS Clifton, several US Navy ships
- Clifton, Auckland, the home of Josiah Firth and a Category 1 Heritage New Zealand listed building

== See also ==
- Clifton Hall (disambiguation)
- Clifton Heights (disambiguation)
- Clifton High School (disambiguation)
- Clifton Hotel (disambiguation)
- Clifton railway station (disambiguation)
- Clifton School (disambiguation)
- Clifden (disambiguation)
