= Clifton, Wisconsin =

Clifton is the name of some places in the U.S. state of Wisconsin:

- Clifton, Grant County, Wisconsin, a town
- Clifton, Monroe County, Wisconsin, a town
- Clifton, Pierce County, Wisconsin, a town
- Clifton (community), Wisconsin, an unincorporated community
