= Old East Baltimore Historic District =

Historic district in Maryland, United States

- U.S. National Register of Historic Places
- U.S. Historic district
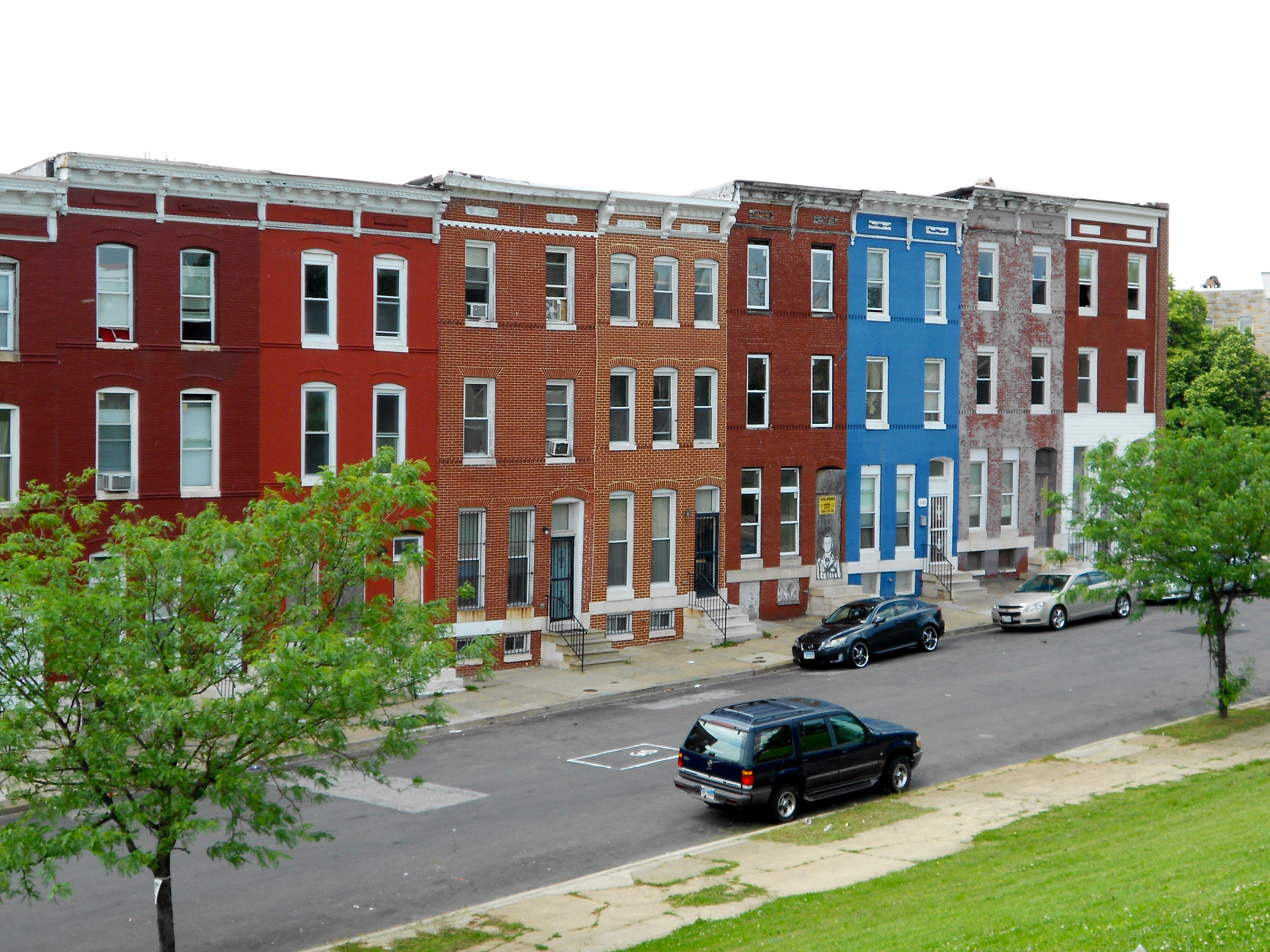
- Old East Baltimore Historic District, May 2013

- Location within Baltimore Location within Maryland Location within the United States
- Location: Generally Bounded by Jones Falls, Greenmount Cemetery, North Ave., Broadway, and Madison, Ashland and Eager Sts., Baltimore, Maryland
- Coordinates: 39°18′19″N 76°36′16″W
- Area: 194 acres (79 ha)
- Architectural style: Mid 19th Century Revival, Late Victorian
- NRHP reference No.: 06001175
- Added to NRHP: December 27, 2006

Old East Baltimore Historic District is a national historic district in Baltimore, Maryland, United States. It is a mainly residential area of Baltimore City that grew up northward from the original mid-18th century settlement east of the Jones Falls, known as Jones Town, or Old Town. It comprises some 70 city blocks covering approximately 194 acres (0.79 km^{2}). The southern part is characterized by vernacular Greek Revival-style working-class housing, constructed in the mid-1840s to mid-1850s for the large numbers of Irish and German immigrants settling there. By the late 1880s and early 1890s all of the blocks in the historic district had been filled with substantial rowhouses showing the influence of Queen Anne and Renaissance Revival styles. The churches in the district include good examples of Italianate, Gothic, Richardsonian Romanesque, Northern European Romanesque, and French Romanesque. Two ethnic Catholic churches, St. John the Evangelist Roman Catholic Church and St. James the Less Roman Catholic Church, are listed separately on the National Register of Historic Places.

It was added to the National Register of Historic Places in 2006.
