= Gompers School (disambiguation) =

Gompers School may refer to:

- Gompers Preparatory Academy in San Diego, California
- Gompers School, also known as Eastern High School and Samuel Gompers General Vocational School, in Baltimore, Maryland
- Samuel Gompers Career and Technical Education High School in The Bronx, New York
- Gompers Woodworking School in Seattle, Washington
