= Clifton, California =

Clifton, California may refer to:

- Clifton, former name of Del Rey, California
- Clifton, former name of Last Chance, California
