= Clifton School =

Clifton School may refer to

- Clifton School (South Africa)
- Clifton Preparatory School, Nottingham Road, South Africa
- Clifton School (Baltimore, Maryland)
- Clifton College, England
- Clifton Community School, Rotherham, England
- Clifton High School (disambiguation)
