= Clifton, Oregon =

Clifton, Oregon may refer to:

- Clifton, Clatsop County, Oregon, an unincorporated community
- Clifton, Hood River County, Oregon, an unincorporated locale
