= USS Clifton =

USS Clifton may refer to the following ships of the United States Navy:

- USS Clifton (1861), a side-wheel gunboat of the American Civil War
- USS Clifton (ID-2080), a motorboat which served from 1917–1918
- USS Clifton (IX-184), a station tanker which served from 1945–1946

== See also ==
- USS Clifton Sprague (FFG-16), a guided missile frigate
