= Oak Street Garage =

History building in Maryland, US

- U.S. National Register of Historic Places
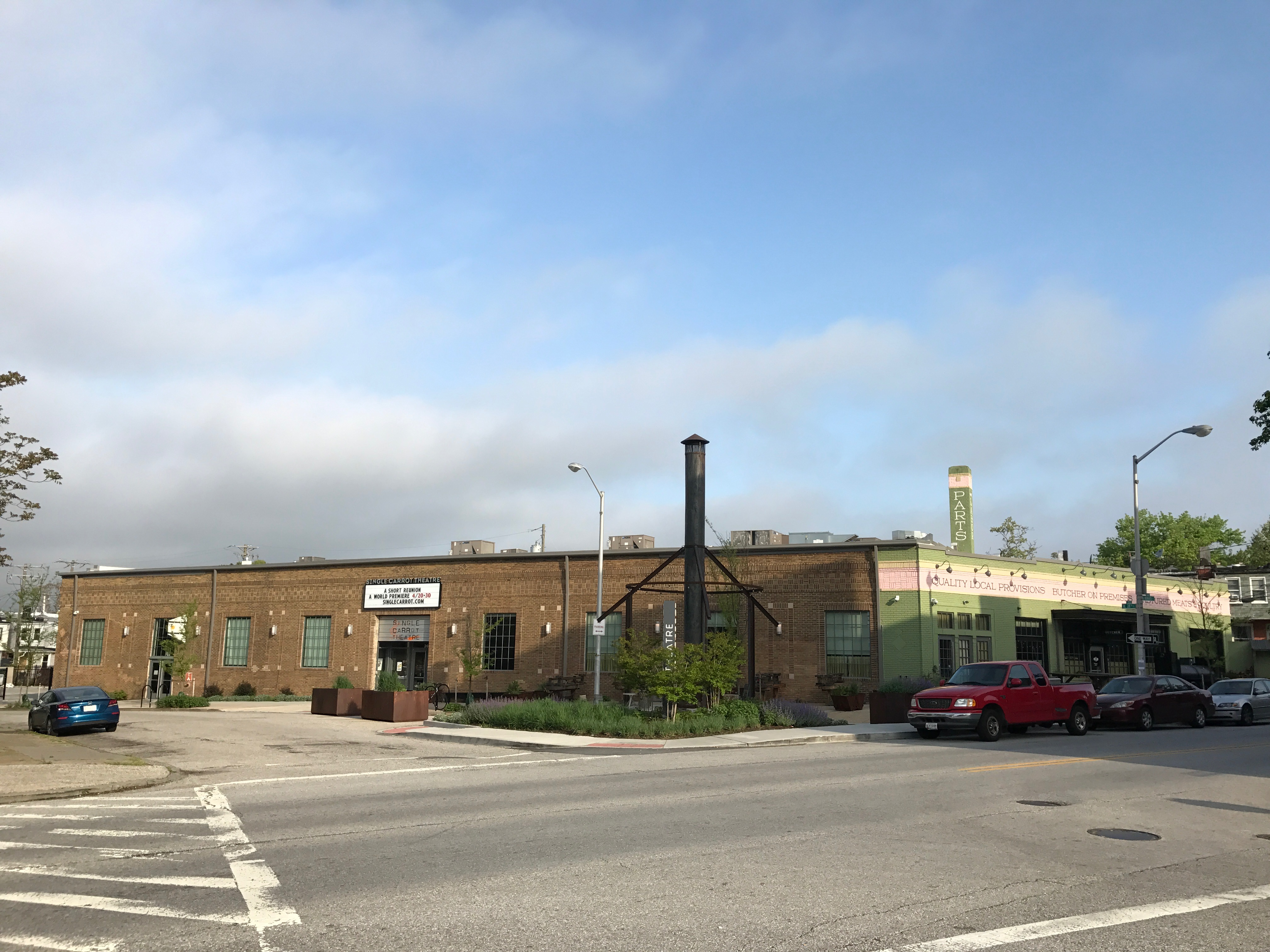

- Location within Baltimore Location within Maryland Location within the United States
- Location: 2600 North Howard St., Baltimore, Maryland
- Coordinates: 39°19′10.4″N 76°37′12.3″W
- Built: 1924
- NRHP reference No.: 13000849
- Added to NRHP: October 23, 2013

The Oak Street Garage is an historic automotive storage and repair facility at 2600 North Howard Street in Baltimore, Maryland. The single story Beaux Arts style building was built in 1924 and expanded in 1927. The building has a roughly trapezoidal shape, with a triangular office area in the front and two garage bays in the rear, the second (the 1927 addition) a few steps down from the first. The building is finished in brick. It was first used by Neely and Ensor, a manufacturer of high-end carriages that had branched out into the automotive field. At the time, what is now Howard Street in that area was called Oak Street.

The building was listed on the National Register of Historic Places in 2013.

== See also ==
- National Register of Historic Places listings in East and Northeast Baltimore
