= McDonogh Place Historic District =

Historic district in Maryland, United States

- U.S. National Register of Historic Places
- U.S. Historic district
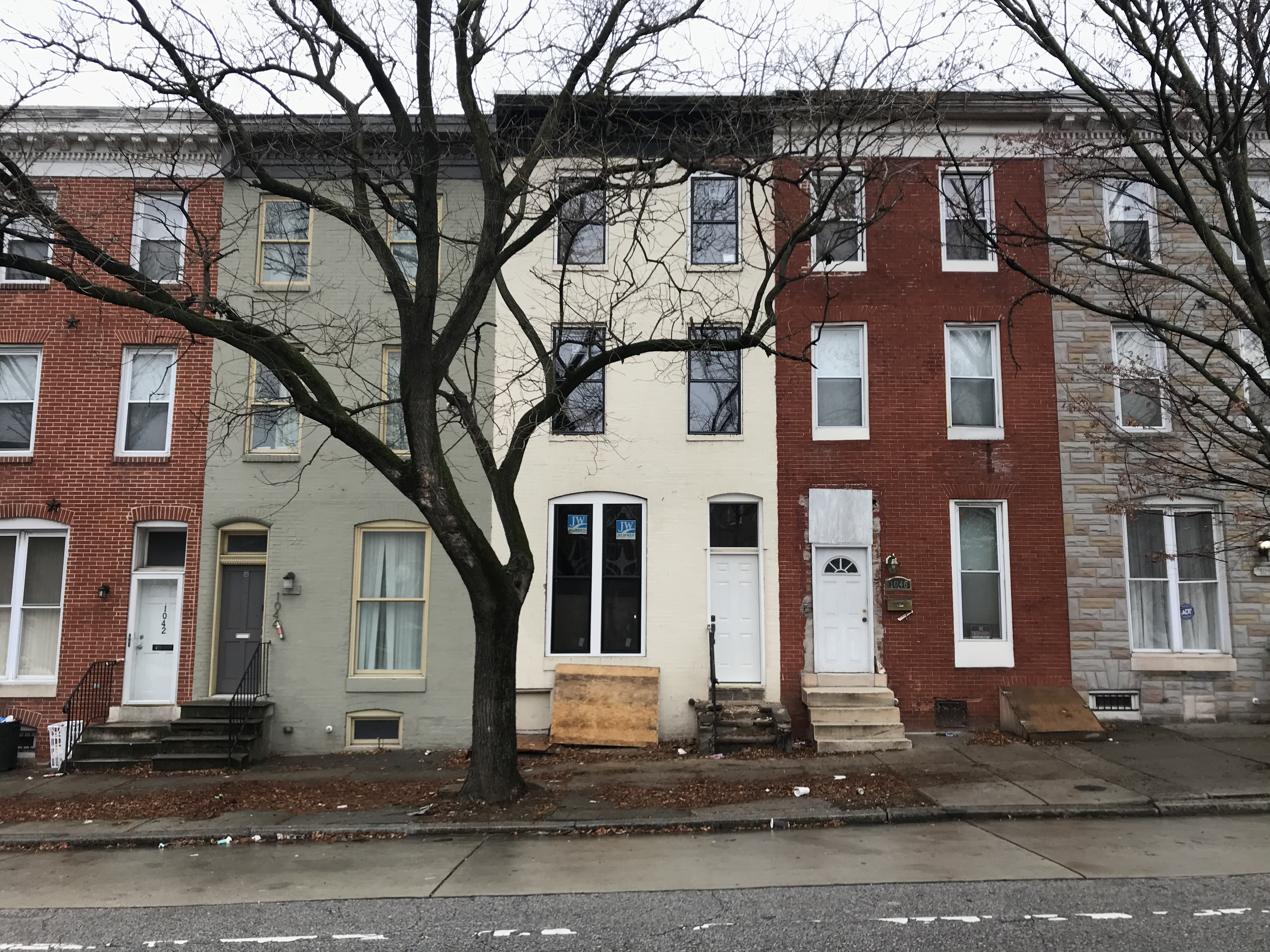
- Row houses on N. Broadway

- Location within Baltimore Location within Maryland Location within the United States
- Location: 1101-51 N. Broadway, 1004-42 McDonogh Pl., Baltimore, Maryland
- Coordinates: 39°18′10″N 76°35′39″W
- NRHP reference No.: 15000172
- Added to NRHP: April 28, 2015

The McDonogh Place Historic District is a national historic district in Baltimore, Maryland, United States. It encompasses two sets of rowhouses, one on North Broadway and the other on McDonogh Place, between East Chase and East Eager Streets. They are three stories in height, built out of brick, and have Italianate styling. They were built between 1868 and 1872 by the McDonogh Place Company, and are the last surviving rowhouses (out of nine blocks in all) of that company. At the time of their construction, this stretch of Broadway was being developed as a fashionable residential area.

The district was added to the National Register of Historic Places in 2015.

== See also ==
- National Register of Historic Places listings in East and Northeast Baltimore
