= Clifton Hall =

Clifton Hall may refer to:

== Buildings ==
- Clifton Hall, Cheshire, an 18th-century country house in England, adjacent to Rocksavage
- Clifton Hall, Cumbria, a 15th-century manor house in England
- Clifton Hall, Nottingham, a country house in Clifton, Nottingham, England
- Clifton Hall (Havertown, Pennsylvania), a historic mansion

== Schools ==
- Clifton Hall School, a school near Edinburgh, Scotland
- Clifton Hall Girls' Grammar School, a former school at Clifton Hall, Nottingham, England

== Other ==
- Clifton Hall Colliery, at Clifton, Greater Manchester (historically in Lancashire), England
- Clifton A. Hall (1826–1913), Rhode Island architect

== See also ==
- Clifton (disambiguation)#Historic sites
