= Clifden (disambiguation) =

Clifden may refer to:

- Clifden, a small town on the west coast of Ireland
- Clifden, New Zealand, a hamlet, noted for the tourist attractions of:
  - Clifden Suspension Bridge
  - Clifden Limestone Caves

== See also ==
- Clifton (disambiguation)
