= Berea–Biddle Street Historic District =

Historic district in Maryland, United States

- U.S. National Register of Historic Places
- U.S. Historic district
- Location within Baltimore Location within Maryland Location within the United States
- Location: Roughly bounded by N. Rose, & Federal Sts., Edison Hwy., PCRR., Baltimore, Maryland
- Coordinates: 39°18′18″N 76°34′43″W
- NRHP reference No.: 14001092
- Added to NRHP: December 29, 2014

The Berea–Biddle Street Historic District is a national historic district in Baltimore, Maryland, United States. It is located in the far eastern part of the historic city bounds, and is roughly bounded by the Edison Highway, Federal Street, North Rose Street, and the railroad tracks of the Penn Central Railroad. This area was one of the last to be developed within the city's 1851 boundaries, and consists mainly of two-story rowhouses built between about 1890 and 1925. The centerpiece of the district is the St. Katherine of Sienna Roman Catholic church and school complex.

Berea–Biddle Street is historically significant due to its association with the immigrant history of Baltimore, in particular the Bohemian/Czechoslovak immigrants who began settling in the area during the 1870s and 1880s. By the early 1900s, many of the Czech immigrants had relocated northeast to access more modern and spacious housing. Many Irish and Italian immigrants also lived in the neighborhood during the late 1800s and early 1900s.

The district was added to the National Register of Historic Places in 2014.

== See also ==
- National Register of Historic Places listings in East and Northeast Baltimore
