= Public School No. 109 =

- U.S. National Register of Historic Places
- Location within Baltimore Location within Maryland Location within the United States
- Location: N. Broadway and Ashland Ave., Baltimore, Maryland
- Coordinates: 39.3003°N 76.5940°W
- Area: 0.3 acres (0.12 ha)
- Built: 1876
- Architectural style: Open plan
- NRHP reference No.: 79001110
- Added to NRHP: September 25, 1979

Public School No. 109, also known as Male and Female Primary School No. 5 and Broadway School, was a historic elementary school located at Baltimore, Maryland, United States. It was a two-story red brick utilitarian building featured a central tower capped by a pediment, two large chimneys with arched openings, and an entrance appendage on the south façade housing a stairwell. It was constructed in 1876 as an "open plan" school with classes separated by glass partitions. It was demolished in late 2003/early 2004 in order to make room for the Kennedy Krieger Institute’s new “Community Behavioral Health Center.”

Public School No. 109 was listed on the National Register of Historic Places in 1979.
