= Null House =

Historic house in Maryland, United States

- U.S. National Register of Historic Places
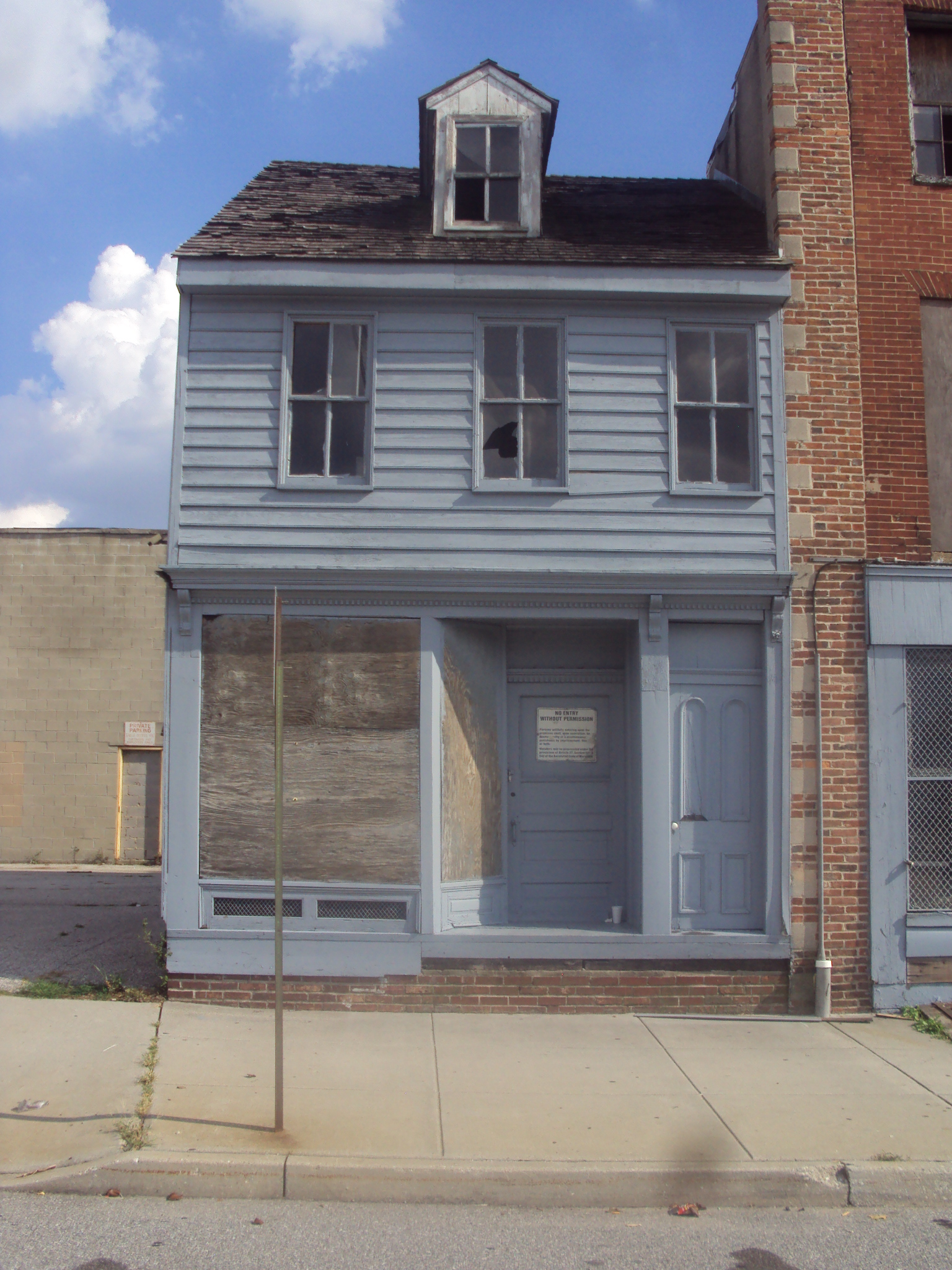
- Null House, Baltimore

- Location within Baltimore Location within Maryland Location within the United States
- Location: 1037 Hillen St., Baltimore, Maryland
- Coordinates: 39°17′46.1″N 76°36′22.5″W
- Area: less than one acre
- Built: 1782
- Architectural style: Italianate
- NRHP reference No.: 83002936
- Added to NRHP: January 27, 1983

Null House is a historic home located at Baltimore, Maryland, United States. It is a 2 1/2-story, three-bay wide dwelling of wood-frame construction that was built between 1782 and 1784. It is a rare specimen of the early wooden clapboard building. The façade features a one-story wooden Italianate storefront of later construction with large store windows and two entrances. Originally located at 1010 Hillen Street, to save the building from demolition, it was moved on September 28, 1980, to the present site, 300 feet northeast of its original location on the opposite side of Hillen Street.

Null House was listed on the National Register of Historic Places on January 27, 1983.

== Gallery ==
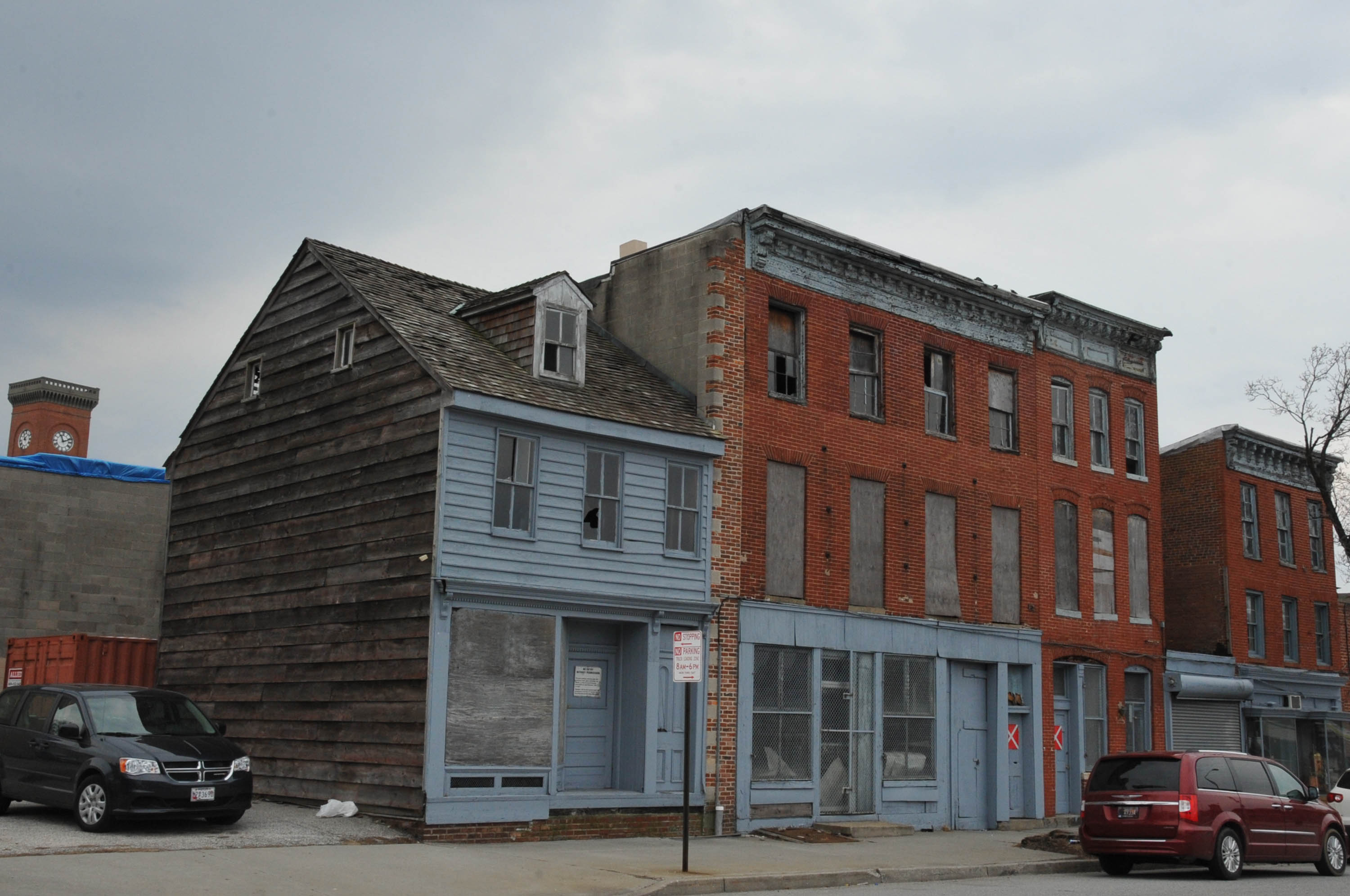
