= Rowhouses at 303-327 East North Avenue =

Historic houses in Maryland, United States

- U.S. National Register of Historic Places
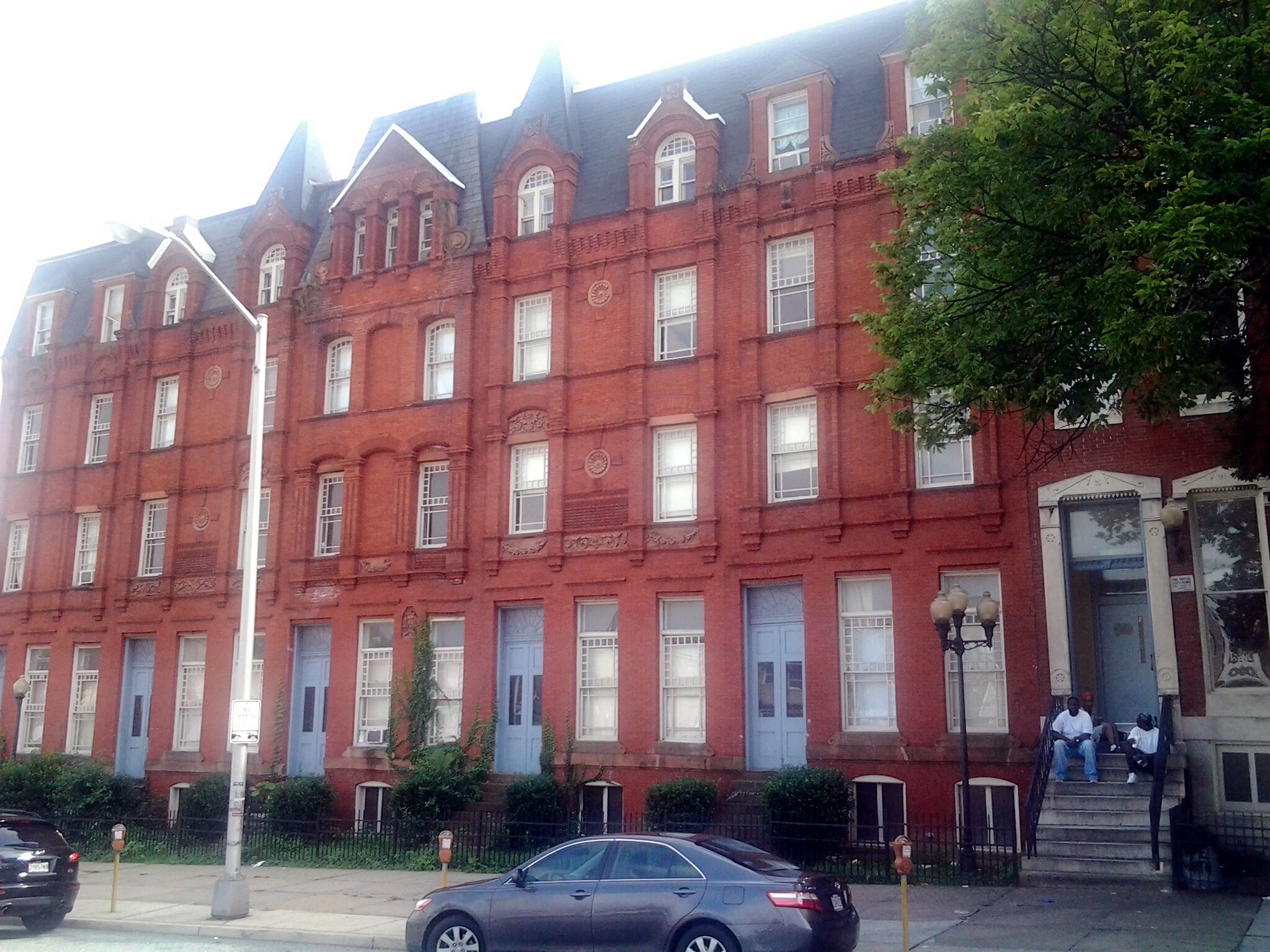
- Rowhouses at 303-327 East North Avenue, September 2012

- Location within Baltimore Location within Maryland Location within the United States
- Location: 303-327 E. North Ave., Baltimore, Maryland
- Coordinates: 39°18′40″N 76°36′43″W
- Area: less than one acre
- Built: 1879
- Architect: Foreman, George A.; Belvidere Land & Loan Co.
- Architectural style: Second Empire
- NRHP reference No.: 84001351
- Added to NRHP: September 13, 1984

Rowhouses at 303-327 East North Avenue is a group of historic rowhouses located at Baltimore, Maryland, United States. The row houses at 303-317 and 319-327 East North Avenue consists of two groups of brick Victorian row houses that rest on high masonry foundations and are four stories high which includes a mansard roof. These two groups of row houses are some of the most elaborately decorated rows that were constructed in Baltimore in the late 19th century outside of Mount Vernon.

Rowhouses at 303-327 East North Avenue was listed on the National Register of Historic Places in 1984.
