= Public School No. 37 =

Historic elementary school in Maryland, USA

- U.S. National Register of Historic Places
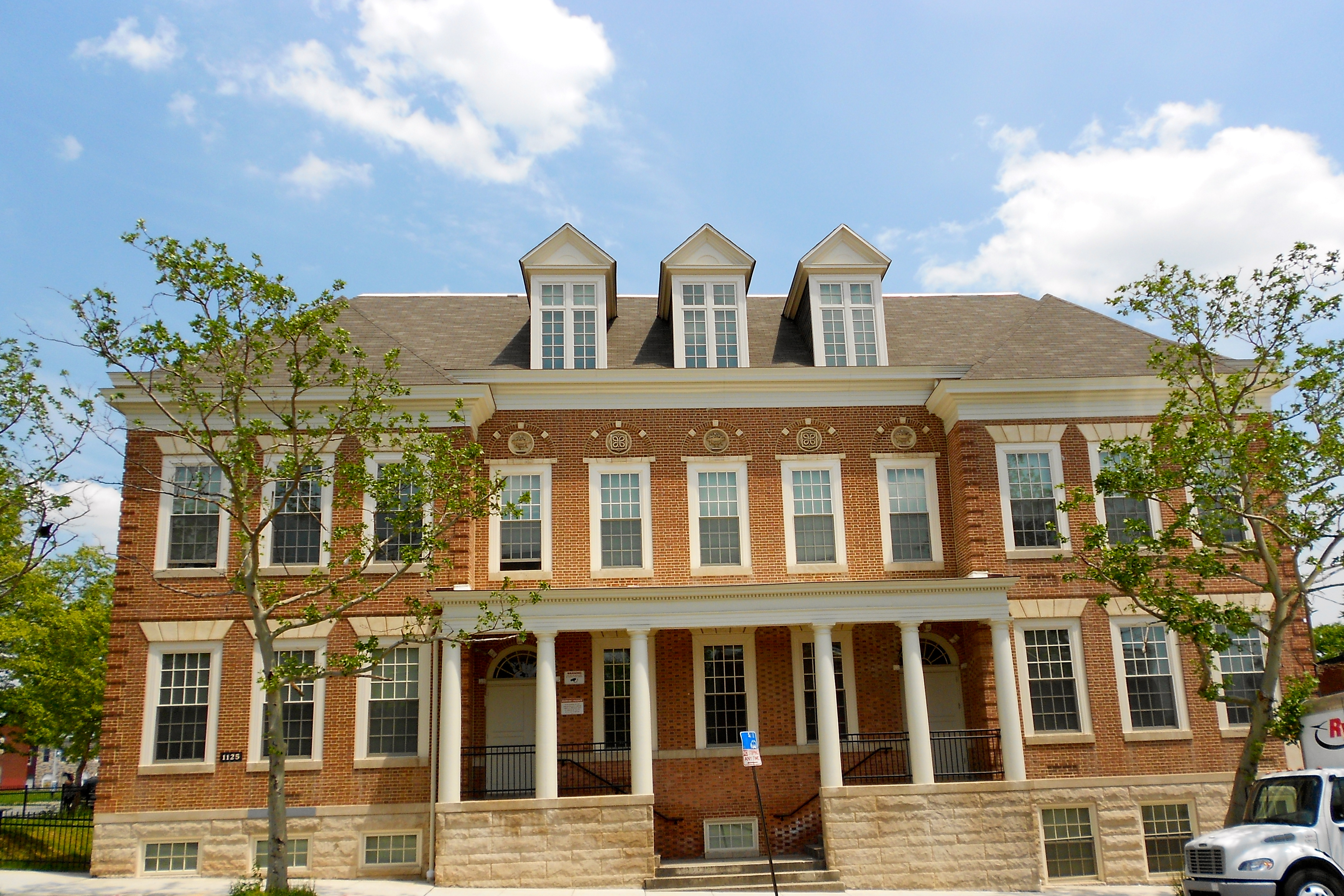
- Public School No. 37, May 2013

- Location within Baltimore Location within Maryland Location within the United States
- Location: E. Biddle St. and N. Patterson Park Ave., Baltimore, Maryland
- Coordinates: 39°18′16″N 76°35′8″W
- Area: 0.5 acres (0.20 ha)
- Built: 1896
- Architect: Ellicott & Emmart; Ellicott, William E., Jr.
- Architectural style: Colonial Revival, Georgian Revival
- NRHP reference No.: 79001112
- Added to NRHP: September 25, 1979

Public School No. 37, also known as Patrick Henry School and Primary School No. 37, is a historic elementary school located at Baltimore, Maryland, United States. It is an elaborately detailed 2 1/2-story Georgian Revival structure. The entrance portico has six freestanding columns, rustication at the base, lintels, and quoins, and a large slate-shingled hip roof. It was built in 1896 for $25,000.

Public School No. 37 was listed on the National Register of Historic Places in 1979.
