= Clifton Heights =

Clifton Heights may refer to the following towns and neighborhoods:

in the United States

- Clifton Heights, Louisville, Kentucky
- Clifton Heights, St. Louis, Missouri
- Clifton Heights, Cincinnati, Ohio - see CUF, Cincinnati
- Clifton Heights, Pennsylvania

in the United Kingdom

- Clifton Heights, part of the Clifton Triangle in Clifton, Bristol
