= L. Grief and Bro., Inc. Manufactory =

Historic industrial building in Maryland, US

- L. Greif and Bro., Inc. Manufactory
- U.S. National Register of Historic Places
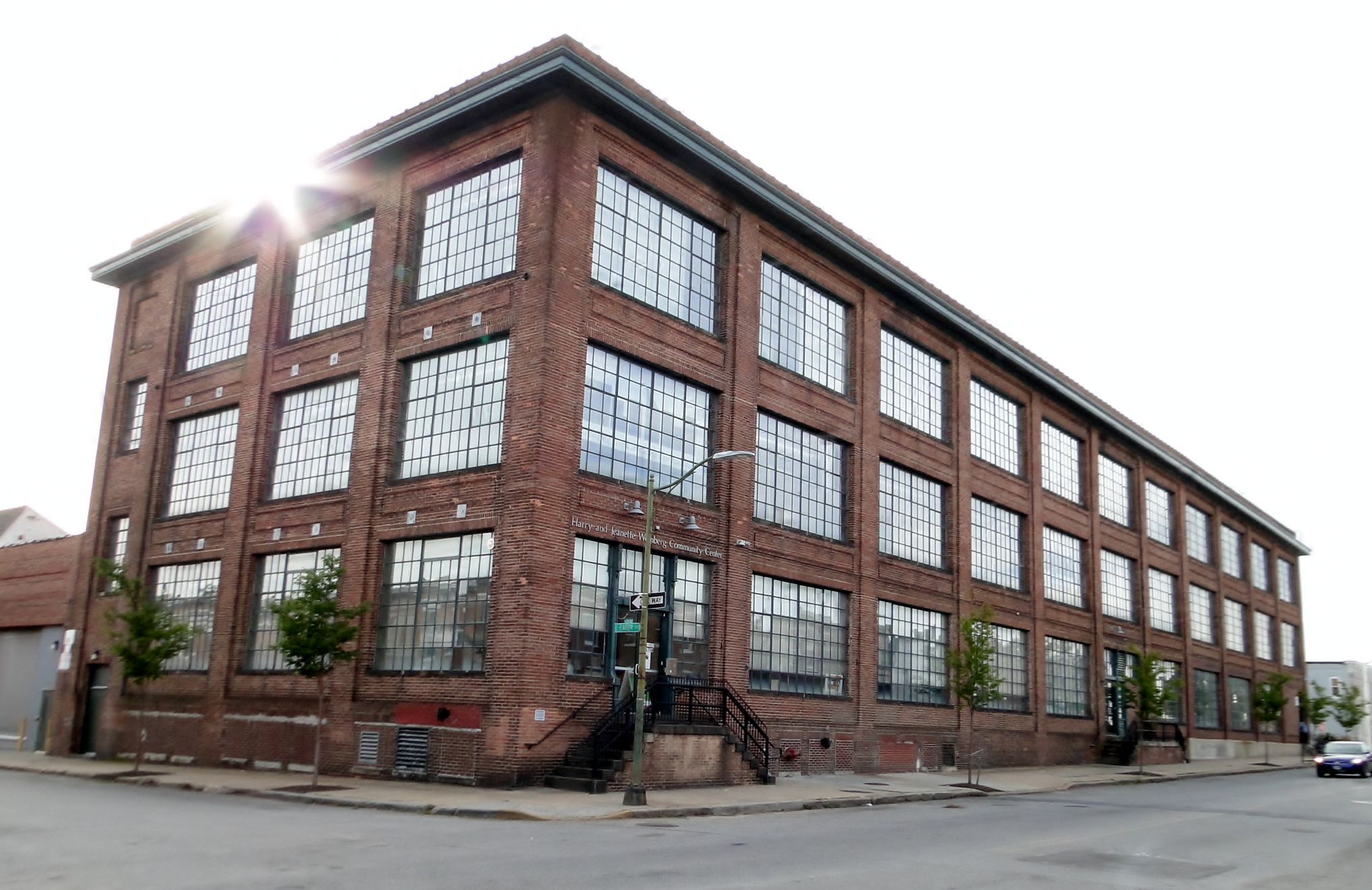

- Location within Baltimore Location within Maryland Location within the United States
- Location: 901 N Milton Ave., Baltimore, Maryland
- Coordinates: 39°18′5″N 76°34′57″W
- Area: 0.7 acres (0.28 ha)
- Built: 1914
- Architect: Frank & Kavanaugh
- Architectural style: Renaissance
- NRHP reference No.: 07001284
- Added to NRHP: December 19, 2007

L. Greif and Bro., Inc. Manufactory is a historic factory building located at Baltimore, Maryland, United States. It is a three-story brick and steel industrial building constructed about 1914–15. It features an expanse of multi-light steel windows, a metal cornice, and sawtooth monitors. It encompasses almost an entire city block and over 60,000 square feet (5,600 m^{2}) of interior space. It served as a clothing factory for L. Greif & Bro., Inc., makers of the men's clothing brand, 'Griffin,' and for a time the country's second-largest men's clothing company. The company was sold to a national conglomerate in 1957.

L. Grief and Bro., Inc. Manufactory was listed on the National Register of Historic Places in 2007.
