= Clifton Hotel =

Clifton Hotel may refer to:

- Clifton Hotel (England)
- Clifton Hotel (Canada)
