= Arcadia–Beverly Hills Historic District =

Historic district in Maryland, United States

- U.S. National Register of Historic Places
- U.S. Historic district
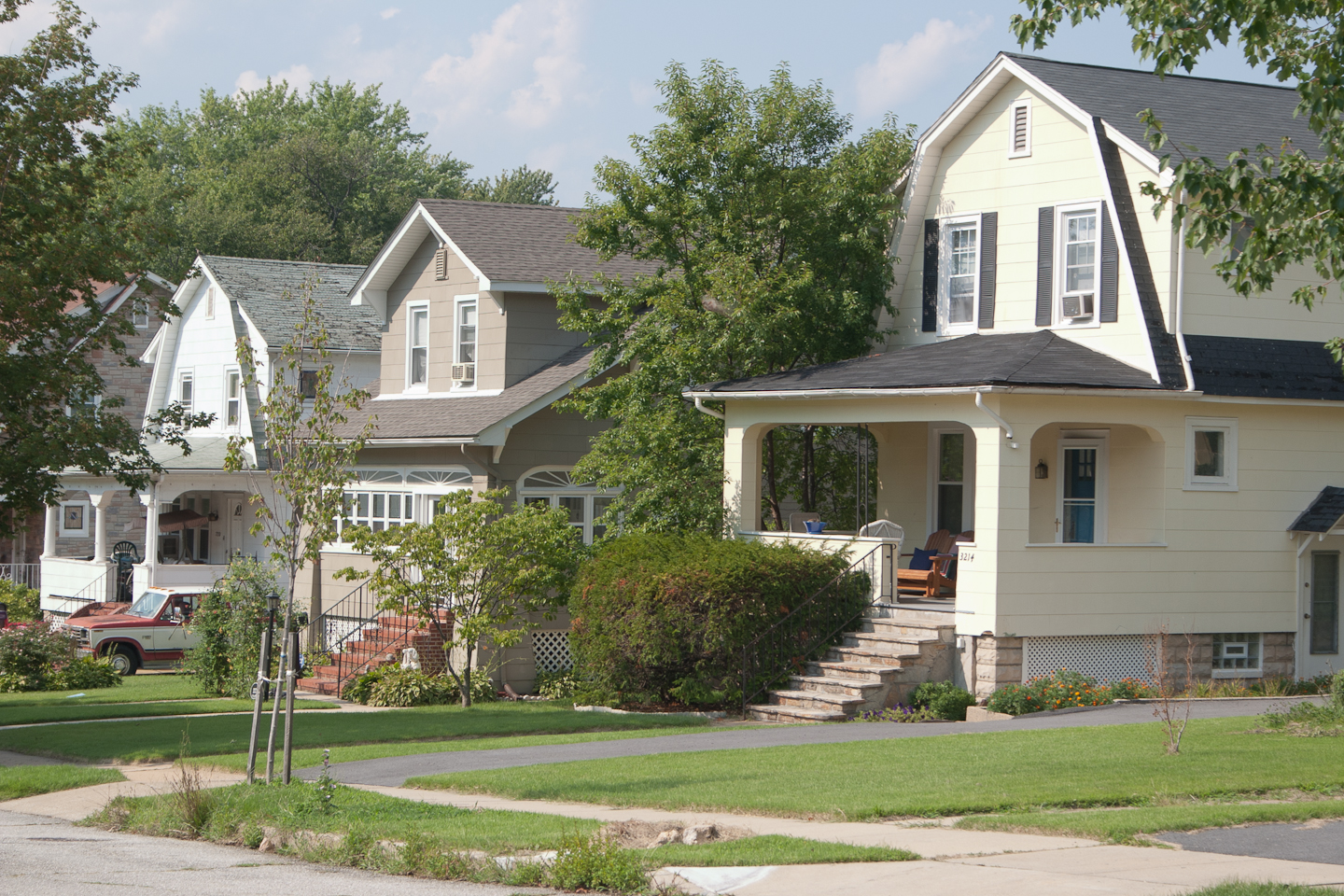
- Houses along Weaver Avenue, August 2011

- Location within Baltimore Location within Maryland Location within the United States
- Location: Moravia Rd.--Belair Rd.--Herring Run Park--Harford Rd., Baltimore, Maryland
- Coordinates: 39°20′13″N 76°34′6″W
- Area: 180 acres (73 ha)
- Architectural style: Late 19th And 20th Century Revivals, Bungalow/craftsman
- NRHP reference No.: 04001375
- Added to NRHP: December 23, 2004

Arcadia–Beverly Hills Historic District is a national historic district in Baltimore, Maryland, United States. It is a cohesive residential suburb comprising approximately 30 irregularly shaped blocks containing some 900 buildings. They are primarily freestanding masonry and frame houses set back from the streets with small front yards. Early-20th century suburban architectural styles represented in the district include foursquare, bungalows, early suburban villas, Colonial Revival, Tudor Revival, and Pueblo Revival. Also included are two churches, a 45-acre (180,000 m^{2}) cemetery, and a variety of commercial buildings along Harford and Belair Roads. Herring Run Park provides a wooded park setting for the community. The earliest structure in the community was constructed in 1887, and the district had substantially achieved its existing form and appearance by 1950.

It was added to the National Register of Historic Places in 2004.
