= Old Town Savings Bank =

- U.S. National Register of Historic Places
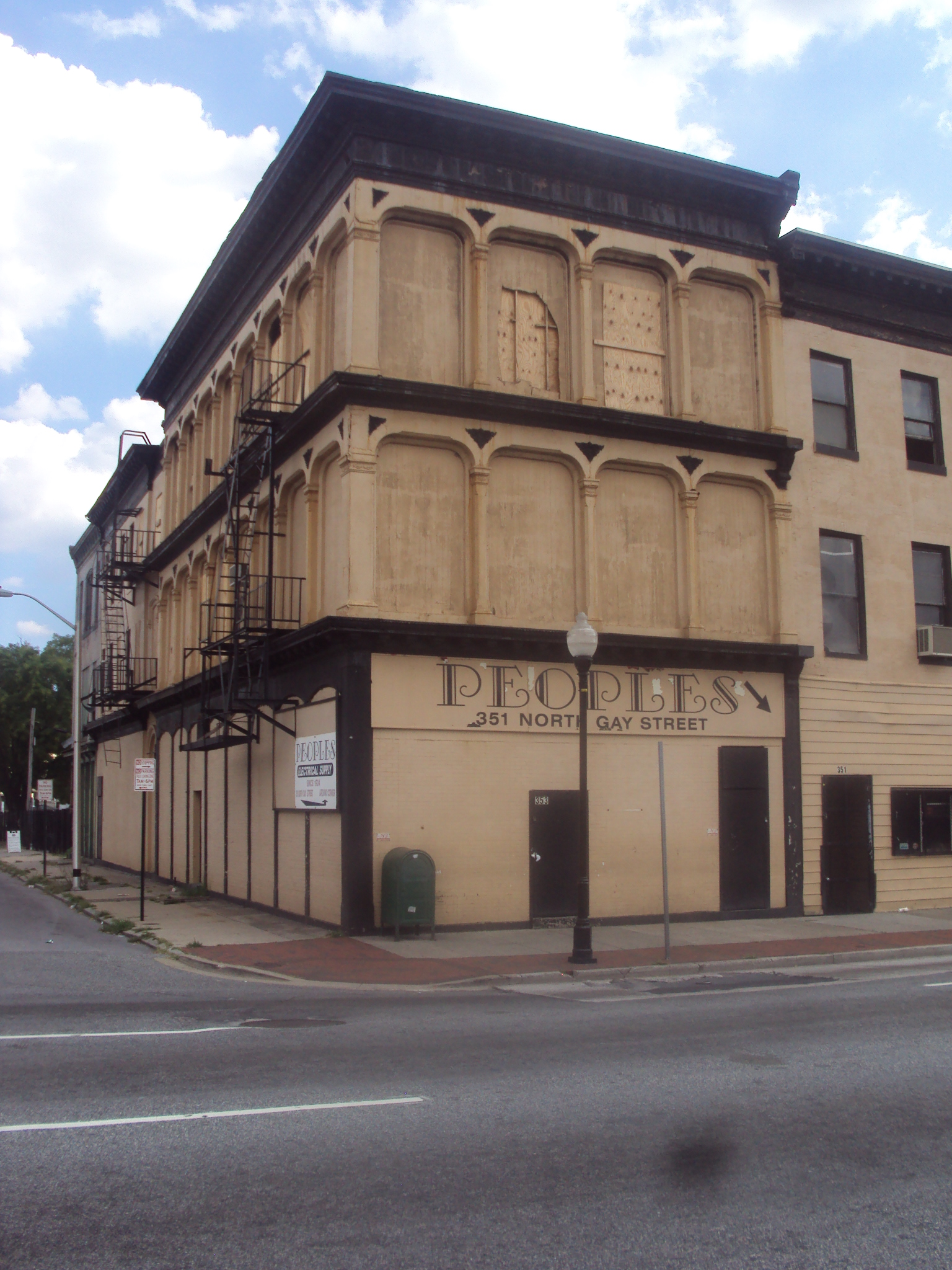
- Old Town Savings Bank, Baltimore

- Location within Baltimore Location within Maryland Location within the United States
- Location: 353 N. Gay St., Baltimore, Maryland
- Coordinates: 39°17′39.7″N 76°36′22.7″W
- Area: less than one acre
- Built: 1871
- Architects: Davis, Frank E.
- Architectural style: Italianate
- MPS: Cast Iron Architecture of Baltimore MPS
- NRHP reference No.: 96000470
- Added to NRHP: May 9, 1996

Old Town Savings Bank, also known as Cala Brothers, is a historic loft building located at Baltimore, Maryland, United States. It is a three-story loft structure designed by architect Frank E. Davis (1839-1921) and constructed in 1871. Both the street façades are cast iron, four bays wide on Gay Street and eight bays wide on Exeter Street. It is a Full Cast Iron Front building. It operated as a bank until about 1940, then housed a wholesale distributor of tobacco and confectionery.

Old Town Savings Bank was listed on the National Register of Historic Places in 1996.
