= Clifton (Lexington, Virginia) =

Historic house in Virginia, United States

- U.S. National Register of Historic Places
- Virginia Landmarks Register
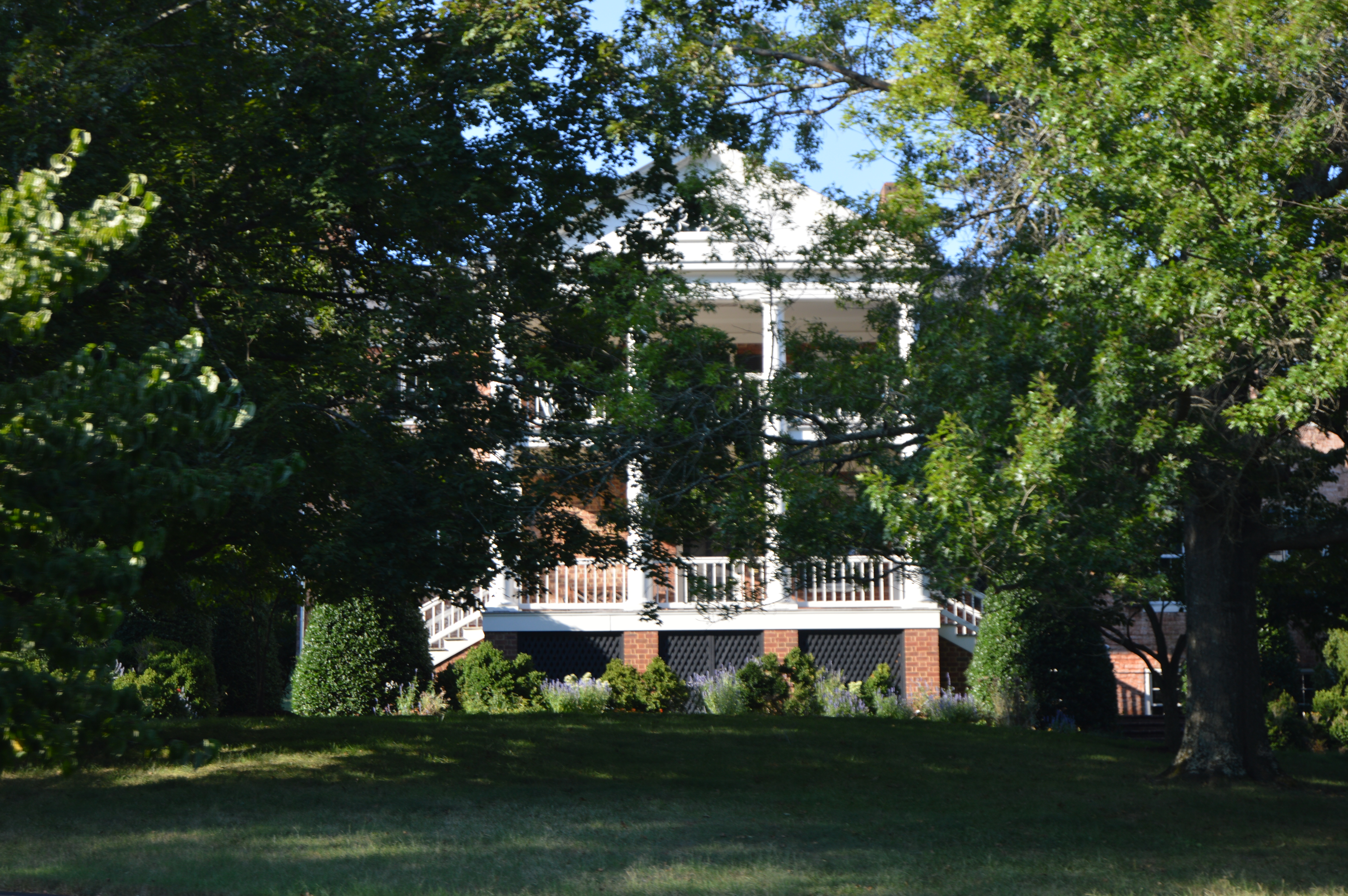
- Front, seen from the road

- Location within Virginia Location within the United States
- Location: VA 631 N side, 2000 ft. E of jct. with US 11, near Lexington, Virginia
- Coordinates: 37°47′30″N 79°25′10″W
- Area: 24.7 acres (10.0 ha)
- Built: 1815
- Architectural style: Federal
- NRHP reference No.: 94000778
- VLR No.: 081-0288

Significant dates
- Added to NRHP: July 22, 1994
- Designated VLR: April 20, 1994

Clifton is a historic home located near Lexington, Virginia, United States. The house was built about 1815, and is a two-story, seven-bay, Federal style brick dwelling. It has a side-gable roof and four chimneys. A two-story portico replaced an earlier Victorian portico in the 1980s. The property includes the contributing small stone servant's quarters or foreman's house and a wooden icehouse.

The address is 205 Old Buena Vista Road. It was built by Major John Alexander and overlooks the Maury River. Washington and Lee rowing teams would race at this location in the late 1800s.

It was listed on the National Register of Historic Places in 1994.
