= Clifton railway station =

Clifton railway station may refer to:

== United Kingdom ==
- Clifton railway station, Bristol, the original name of Hotwells railway station
- Clifton Bridge railway station, which served Hotwells in Bristol
- Clifton Down railway station serving Clifton, Bristol
- Clifton and Lowther railway station which served the village of Clifton on the Lancaster to Carlisle line, Cumbria
- Clifton railway station (Greater Manchester) serving Clifton, in the Metropolitan Borough of Salford
- Clifton Mayfield railway station which served Clifton, Derbyshire
- Clifton Mill railway station which served Clifton-upon-Dunsmore, Warwickshire
- Clifton Moor railway station which served the village of Clifton on the Eden Valley Railway, Cumbria
- Clifton Road railway station which served the village of Clifton, Brighouse, West Yorkshire
- Clifton-on-Trent railway station which served the villages of North and South Clifton in eastern Nottinghamshire

== United States ==
- Clifton station (Erie Railroad), which served Clifton, New Jersey
- Clifton station (NJ Transit), serving Clifton, New Jersey
- Clifton station (Staten Island Railway) serving Clifton, Staten Island, New York
- Clifton station (Virginia), in Clifton, Virginia, USA

== See also ==
- Clinton station (disambiguation)
