= Clifton, Worcestershire =

Village in Worcestershire, England

Coordinates: 52.11486°N 2.222714°W

Clifton
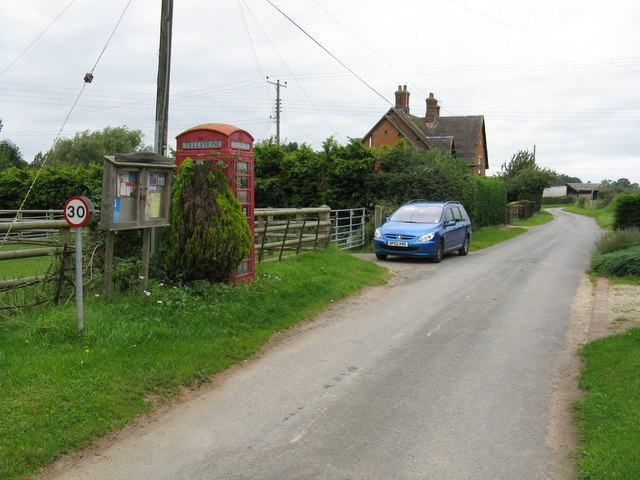

- Location within Worcestershire
- OS grid reference: SO8446
- Civil parish: Severn Stoke
- District: Malvern Hills
- Shire county: Worcestershire
- Region: West Midlands
- Country: England
- Sovereign state: United Kingdom
- Post town: Worcester
- Postcode district: WR8
- Police: West Mercia
- Fire: Hereford and Worcester
- Ambulance: West Midlands

Clifton is a small village in Severn Stoke civil parish, Malvern Hills District, Worcestershire, England. In 2021, the parish of Severn Stoke had a population of 676.
