= Public School No. 99 =

Historic former school in Maryland, USA

- U.S. National Register of Historic Places
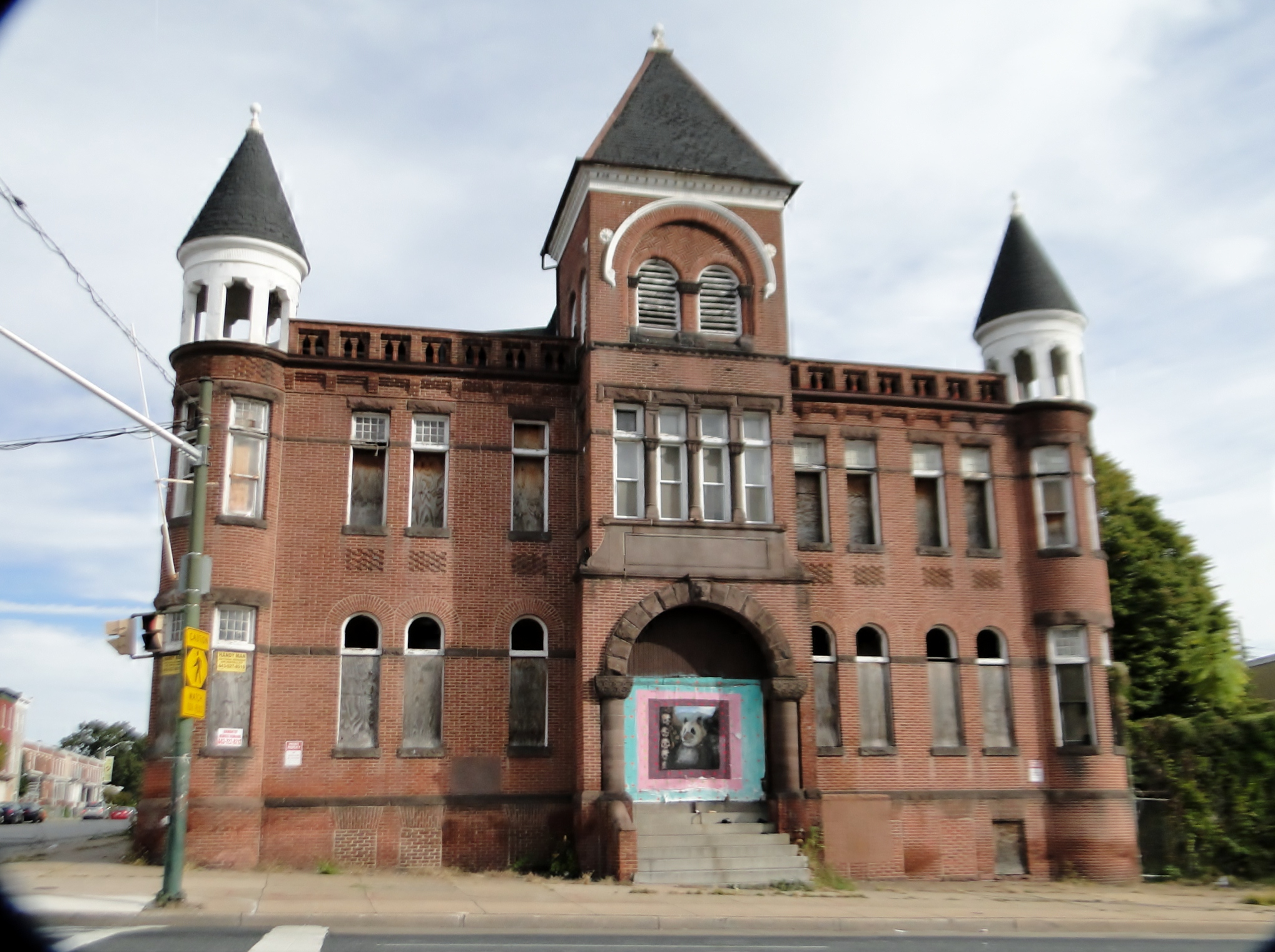

- Location within Baltimore Location within Maryland Location within the United States
- Location: E. North Ave. and N. Washington St., Baltimore, Maryland
- Coordinates: 39°18′46″N 76°35′25″W
- Area: 0.8 acres (0.32 ha)
- Built: 1891
- Architect: Brown, A.S.
- Architectural style: Romanesque
- NRHP reference No.: 79001113
- Added to NRHP: September 25, 1979

Public School No. 4 , also known as Columbus School, is a historic elementary school located at Baltimore, Maryland, United States. It is a two-story Romanesque Revival styled structure constructed in 1891 and expanded in 1905 and 1912. It features a three-story central square tower with pyramidal roof and a flanking pair of cylindrical corner towers with conical roofs. The structure was used as the South Clifton Park Community Center.

Public School No.4 was listed on the National Register of Historic Places in 1979.

The building has been converted to apartments.
