= Gompers School =

Historic high school in Maryland, US

- U.S. National Register of Historic Places
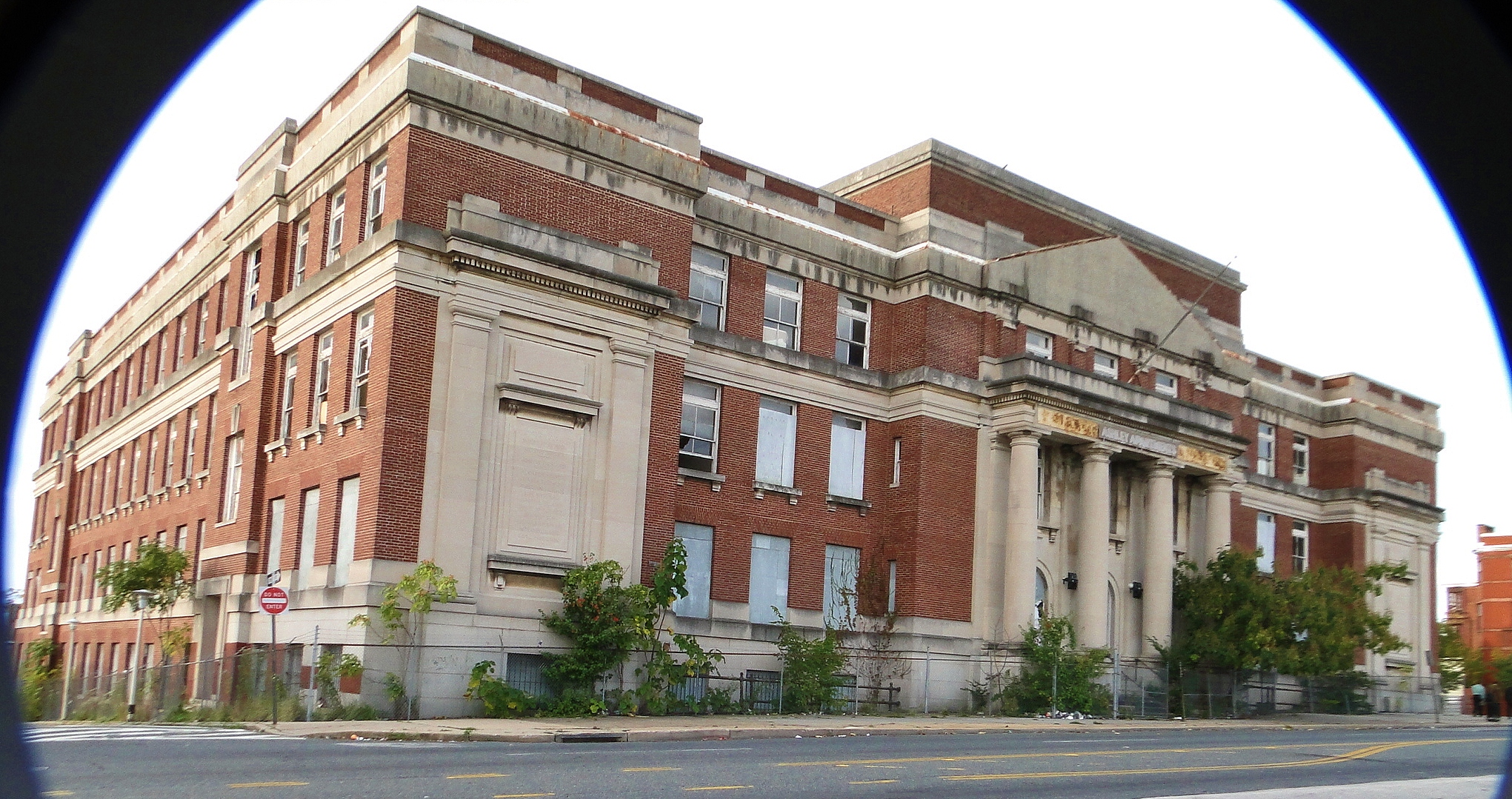
- Gompers School, September 2012

- Location within Baltimore Location within Maryland Location within the United States
- Location: 1701 East North Ave., Baltimore, Maryland
- Coordinates: 39°18′43″N 76°35′41″W
- Area: less than one acre
- Built: 1905
- Architect: Simonson & Pietsch; Thomas, D.W. & G.H.
- Architectural style: Classical Revival
- NRHP reference No.: 85001272
- Added to NRHP: June 20, 1985

Gompers School, also known as Eastern High School and Samuel Gompers General Vocational School, is a historic high school located at Baltimore, Maryland, United States. It was designed and built during a period from 1904 to 1906 as a public high school and remained as an educational facility until its closing in 1981. It is a flat-roofed building on four floor levels, roughly square in plan. The interior layout is characterized by a series of classrooms ringing an open court to allow maximum ventilation and light.

Gompers School was listed on the National Register of Historic Places in 1985.
