= Last Chance, California =

Unincorporated community in California, United States

Last Chance
- Unincorporated community
- Location in California Last Chance (the United States)
- Coordinates: 39°06′41″N 120°37′29″W
- Country: United States
- State: California
- County: Placer County
- Elevation: 4,564 ft (1,391 m)

Last Chance (formerly, Clifton and Caroline Diggings) was a mining community in Placer County, California. Last Chance was located 7.5 miles (12.1 km) northeast of Michigan Bluff, at an elevation of 4564 feet (1391 m).

The Last Chance District was formed in 1862, and a school was built the following year but discontinued in 1879. Last Chance was said to have a population of 46 in 1880. The Last Chance Hotel lasted until 1938; the site is abandoned today.

Last Chance was named by miners. The Last Chance post office operated from 1865 to 1869 and from 1909 to 1919.
