= Clifton, Hood River County, Oregon =

Unincorporated community in the state of Oregon, United States

Coordinates: 45.7070630°N 121.5575737°W

Clifton is an unincorporated locale in Hood River County, Oregon, United States. It is located about 3 miles west of the city of Hood River. The name originates from the drop in elevation Interstate 84 takes from the cliffs there, which are 250 feet above the Columbia River.
