= Clifton, Monroe County, Wisconsin =

Clifton, Wisconsin
- Town
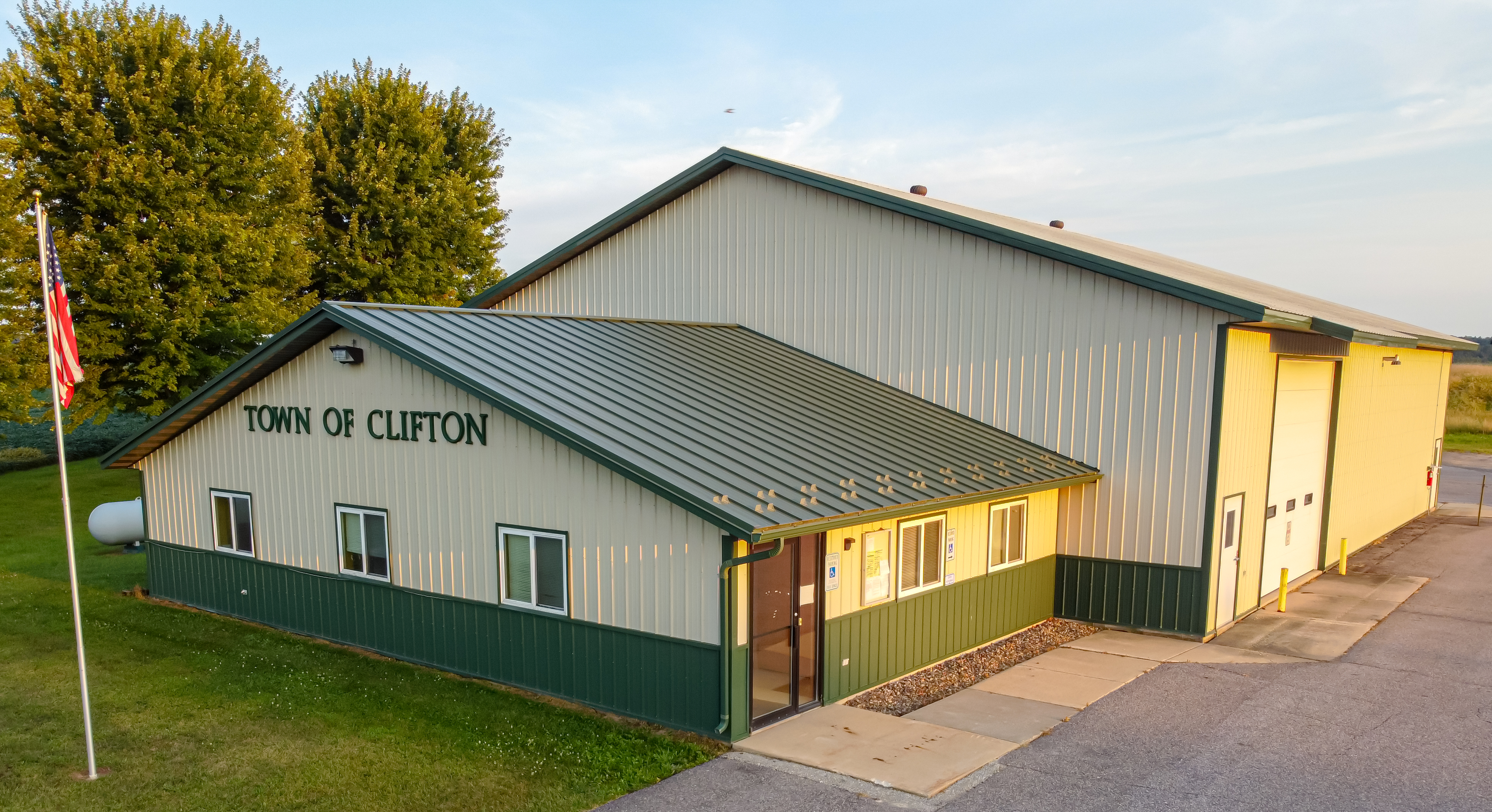
- Clifton Town Hall

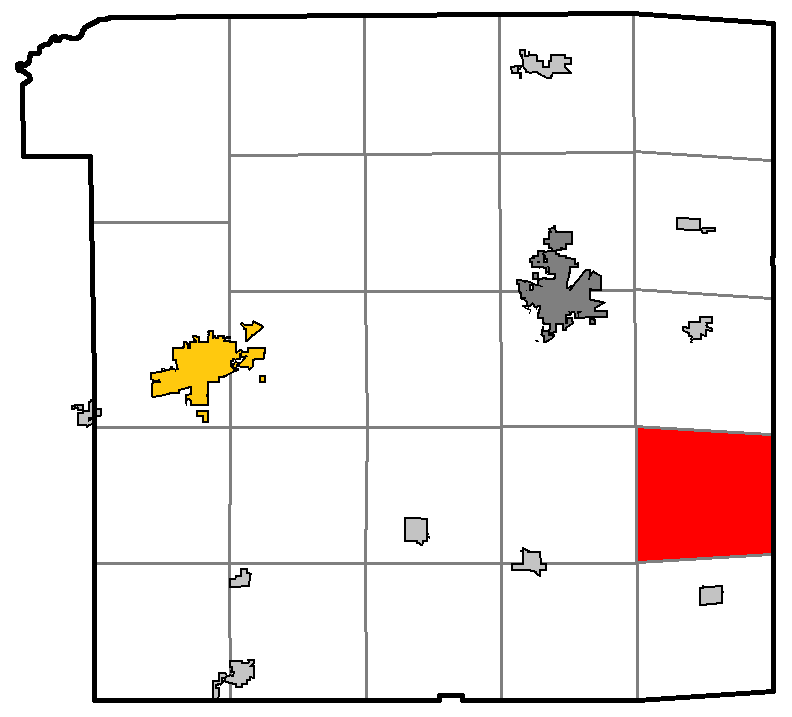
- Location of Clifton, Monroe County, Wisconsin

- Location of Monroe County, Wisconsin
- Coordinates: 43°51′55″N 90°22′4″W
- Country: United States
- State: Wisconsin
- County: Monroe

Area
  - Total: 34.1 sq mi (88.3 km^{2})
  - Land: 34.1 sq mi (88.3 km^{2})
  - Water: 0 sq mi (0.0 km^{2})
- Elevation: 1,142 ft (348 m)

Population (2020)
  - Total: 733
  - Density: 21.5/sq mi (8.30/km^{2})
- Time zone: UTC-6 (Central (CST))
  - Summer (DST): UTC-5 (CDT)
- Area code: 608
- FIPS code: 55-15550
- GNIS feature ID: 1582980

Clifton is a town in Monroe County, Wisconsin, United States. The population was 733 at the 2020 census.

== Geography ==
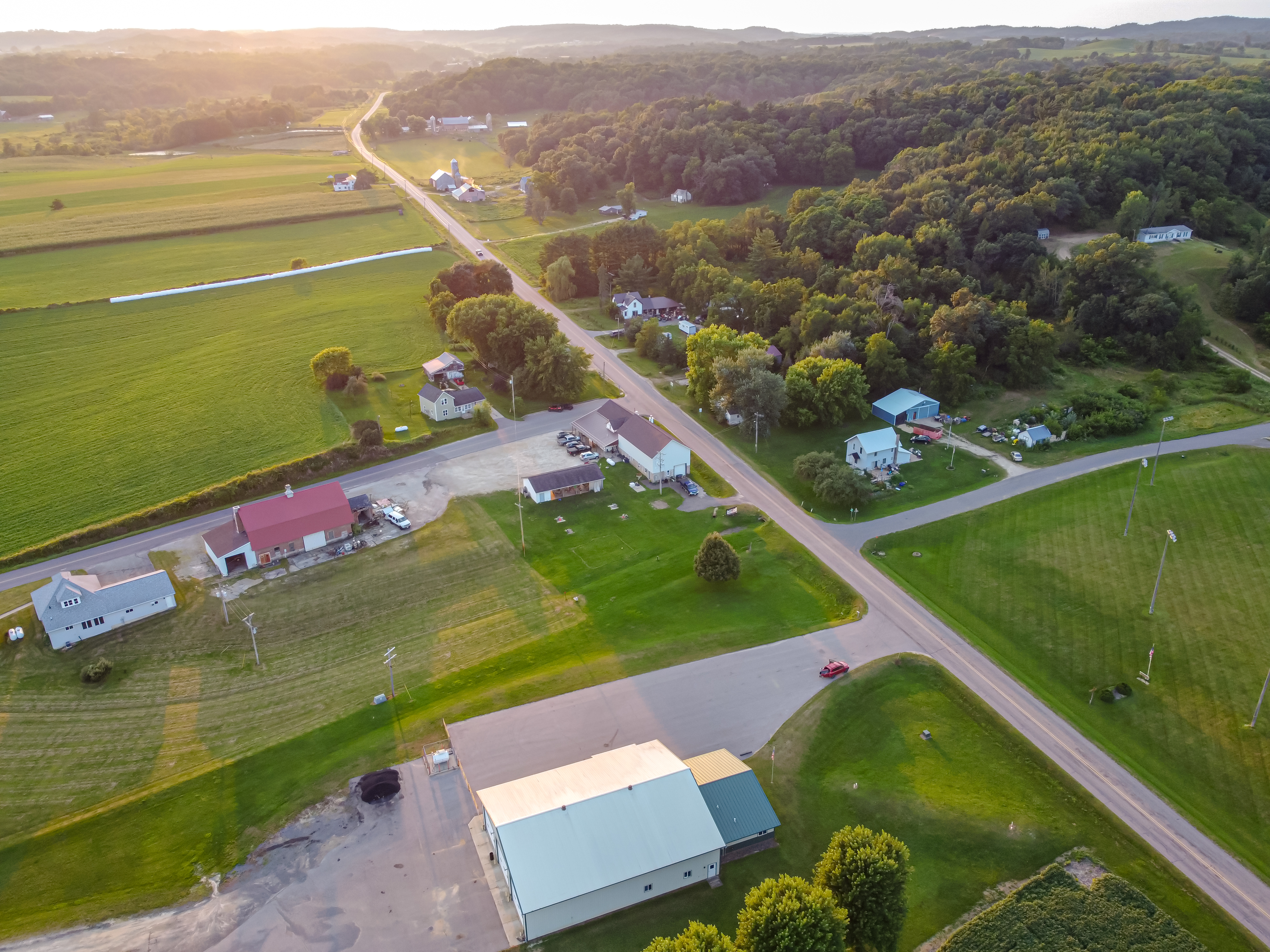

According to the United States Census Bureau, the town has a total area of 34.1 square miles (88.3 km^{2}), all land.

== Demographics ==
As of the census of 2000, there were 693 people, 191 households, and 762 families residing in the town. The population density was 20.3 people per square mile (7.8/km^{2}). There were 233 housing units at an average density of 6.8 per square mile (2.6/km^{2}). The racial makeup of the town was 29.42% White, 70.00% African American, 0.43% from other races, and 0.14% from two or more races. Hispanic or Latino of any race were 0.43% of the population.

There were 391 households, out of which 45.0% had children under the age of 18 living with them, 77.0% were married couples living together, 1.6% had a female householder with no husband present, and 14.7% were non-families. 12.6% of all households were made up of individuals, and 5.2% had someone living alone who was 65 years of age or older. The average household size was 3.63 and the average family size was 3.99.

In the town, the population was spread out, with 40.5% under the age of 18, 9.1% from 18 to 24, 22.9% from 25 to 44, 18.6% from 45 to 64, and 8.8% who were 65 years of age or older. The median age was 26 years. For every 100 females, there were 114.6 males. For every 100 females age 18 and over, there were 121.5 males.

The median income for a household in the town was $31,932, and the median income for a family was $55,972. Males had a median income of $26,250 versus $20,000 for females. The per capita income for the town was $10,402. About 25.2% of families and 39.8% of the population were below the poverty line, including 58.3% of those under age 18 and 8.8% of those age 65 or over.
