= St. James the Less Roman Catholic Church =

Historic church in Maryland, United States

- U.S. National Register of Historic Places
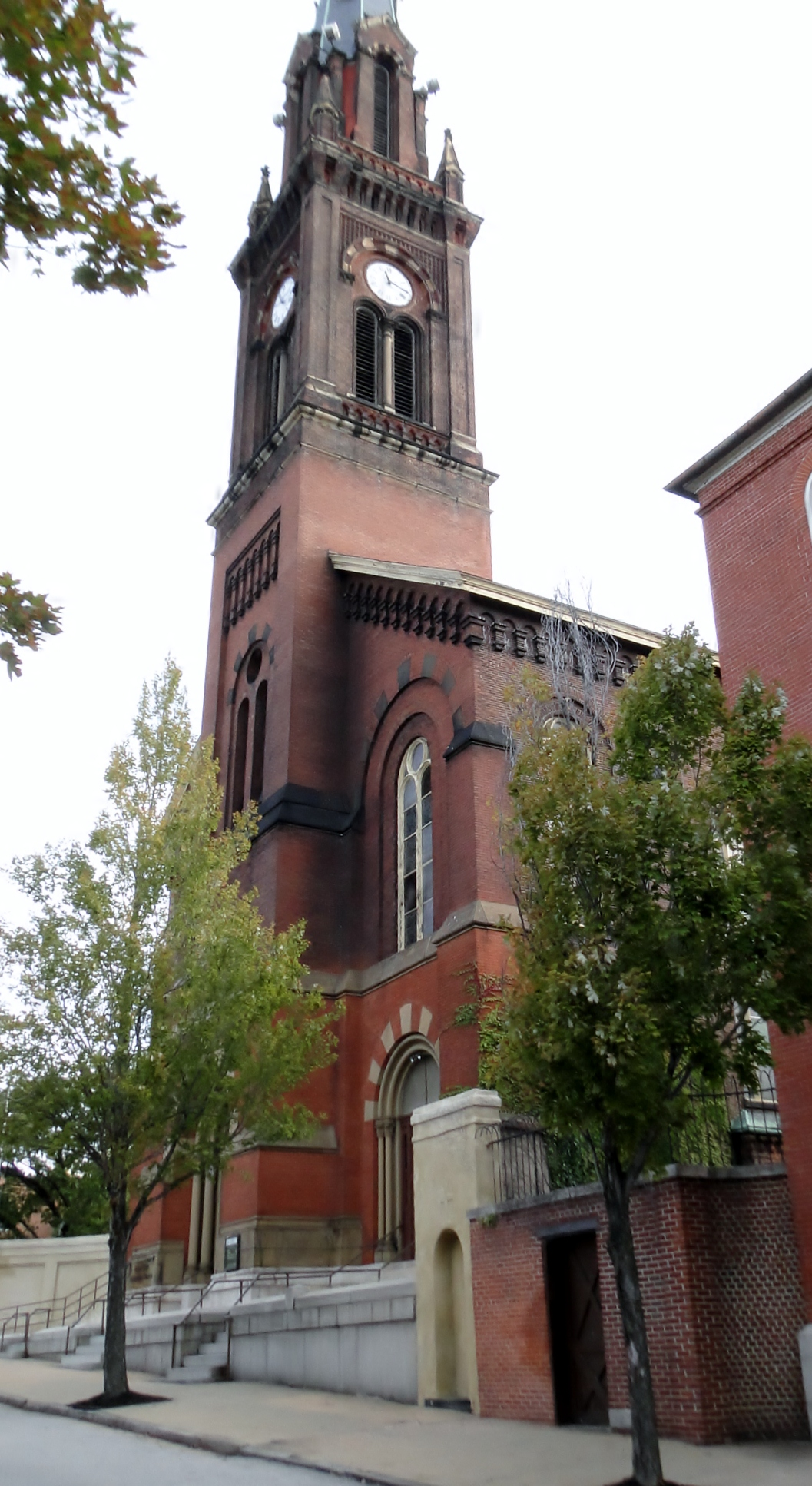
- St. James the Less Roman Catholic Church, September 2012

- Location within Baltimore Location within Maryland Location within the United States
- Location: Aisquith St. at Eager St., Baltimore, Maryland
- Coordinates: 39°18′4″N 76°36′8″W
- Area: less than one acre
- Built: 1865-1867
- Architect: Church, Frederick Aloysius; Et al.
- Architectural style: Gothic, Romanesque
- NRHP reference No.: 82004750
- Added to NRHP: March 15, 1982

St. James the Less Roman Catholic Church, also known as St. James and St. John's Roman Catholic Church, is a historic Catholic church located at Baltimore, Maryland, United States and was one of the earliest neighborhood parishes established in the central city (1833). The building later became Urban Bible Fellowship Church. On March 29, 2020 lightning struck the steeple, causing the building to catch fire and partially collapse.

== History ==
St. James the Less was built by Bishop James Whitfield, at his personal expense. He laid the cornerstone in May 1833 and consecrated the church a year later. Bishop Whitfield died the following October.

In 1966, the neighbouring parish of St. John the Evangelist was closed, and the new parish of St. James and St. John, was formed, the congregation worshipping at St. James. The parish was dissolved around 1986, and the former St. James Church was sold to an evangelical church. Following this, the church was stripped of its windows, altars, marble communion rail, pipe organ, and other artifacts. It was also whitewashed, destroying its historic murals.

St. James the Less Roman Catholic Church was listed on the National Register of Historic Places in 1982.

On the morning of March 28, 2020, the church had a devastating fire that resulted in the destruction of the steeple of the church.

== Description ==
The church is an early work of George A. Frederick (1842-1924), a prolific and prominent architect in Baltimore who designed various buildings in the city including the Baltimore City Hall in 1875. It is a High Victorian Gothic influenced brick structure with Romanesque Revival overtones built 1865-67. It has a tall central tower and featured an ornate interior with marble sculpture and murals. The church is 184 feet long, 65 feet wide, and the ceiling is 51 feet from the floor. The steeple, at 256 feet, is the second tallest church tower in the city (next to First and Franklin Street Presbyterian Church at West Madison Street and Park Avenue, in Mount Vernon-Belveere neighborhood, constructed 1875) and dominates Old East Baltimore. The cross surmounting the spire is 10 feet tall. The largest of the four bells in the tower weighs 5000 pounds and was cast by McShane of Baltimore in 1885. The tower clock was installed during the same year.

The 25 foot-high Mayer windows were installed in 1891. The interior features three large interior murals painted about 1886 by the German-born artist William Lamprecht and marble sculpture work by the Baltimore sculptor Joseph Martin Sudsburg.
