= St. John the Evangelist Roman Catholic Church (Baltimore) =

Historic church in Maryland, United States

- U.S. National Register of Historic Places
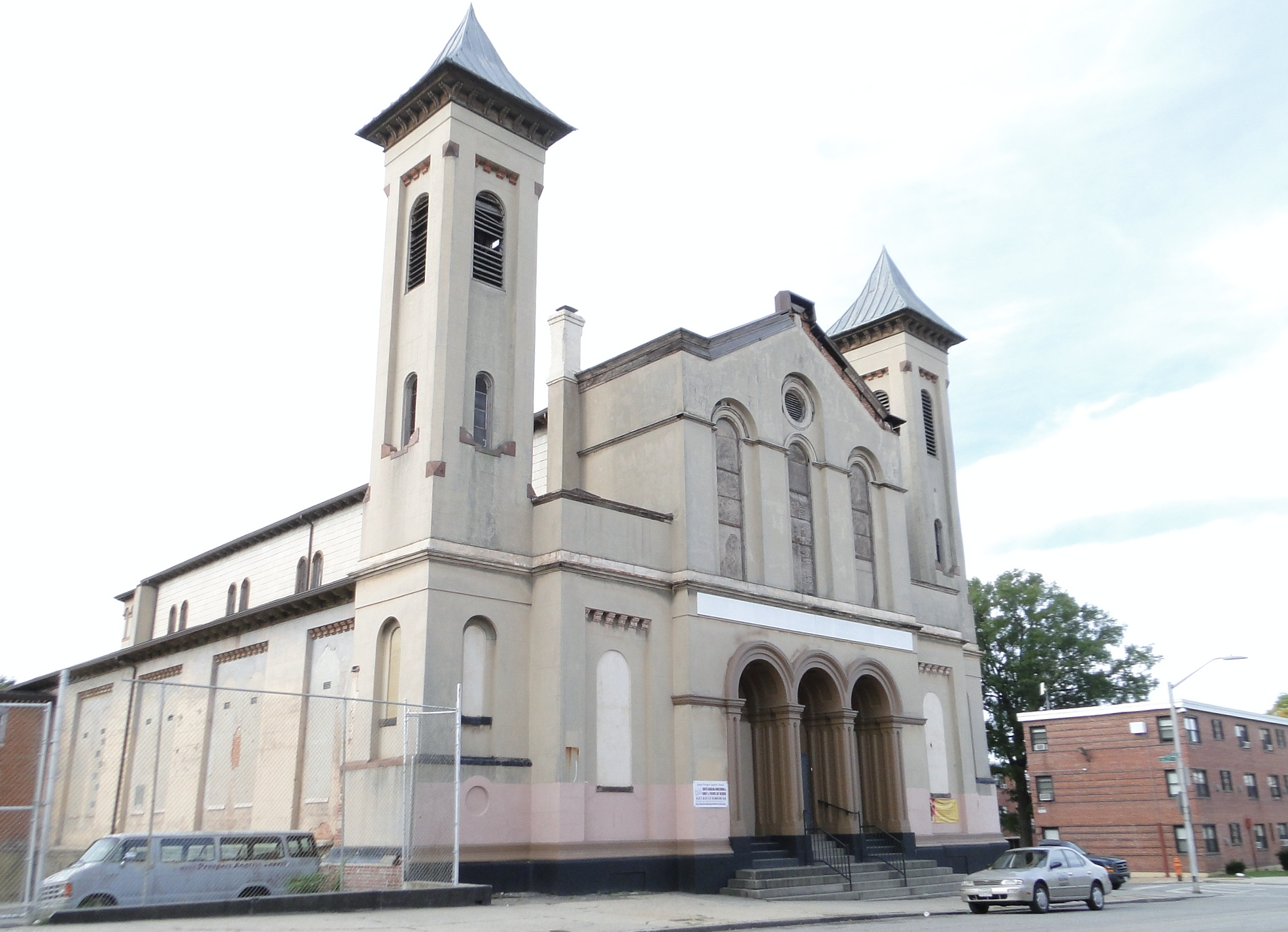
- St. John the Evangelist Roman Catholic Church, September 2012

- Location within Baltimore Location within Maryland Location within the United States
- Location: 901 E. Eager St., Baltimore, Maryland
- Coordinates: 39°18′5″N 76°36′17″W
- Area: less than one acre
- Built: 1855-1856
- Architect: Niernsee & Baldwin; Baldwin, E.F.
- Architectural style: Italianate
- NRHP reference No.: 82004751
- Added to NRHP: March 15, 1982

St. John the Evangelist Roman Catholic Church, now known as Sweet Prospect Baptist Church, is a former Catholic Church located at Baltimore, Maryland, United States.

== Description ==
Designed by Niernsee & Neilson, it is an 1855-1856 Italianate-influenced masonry structure constructed of stuccoed brick walls resting on a rubble stone foundation. The exterior features twin square towers flanking the main façade and a semi-octagonal apse flanked by one-story pavilions on the back. There are three portal arches in the center section of the main façade, several steps above the sidewalk. It is the most intact remaining example of an Italianate public edifice in Baltimore.

Under instructions from the Roman Catholic Archdiocese of Baltimore, the final mass was held at the Church of St. John the Evangelist, on June 26, 1966, and the congregation merged with that of St. James the Less Roman Catholic Church, just two block away. The church then became the New Central Social Hall. Most of the interior decorative artwork and accessories associated with church use were removed.

St. John the Evangelist Roman Catholic Church was listed on the National Register of Historic Places in 1982.
