= Clifton School (Baltimore, Maryland) =

Historic school building in Maryland, US

- U.S. National Register of Historic Places
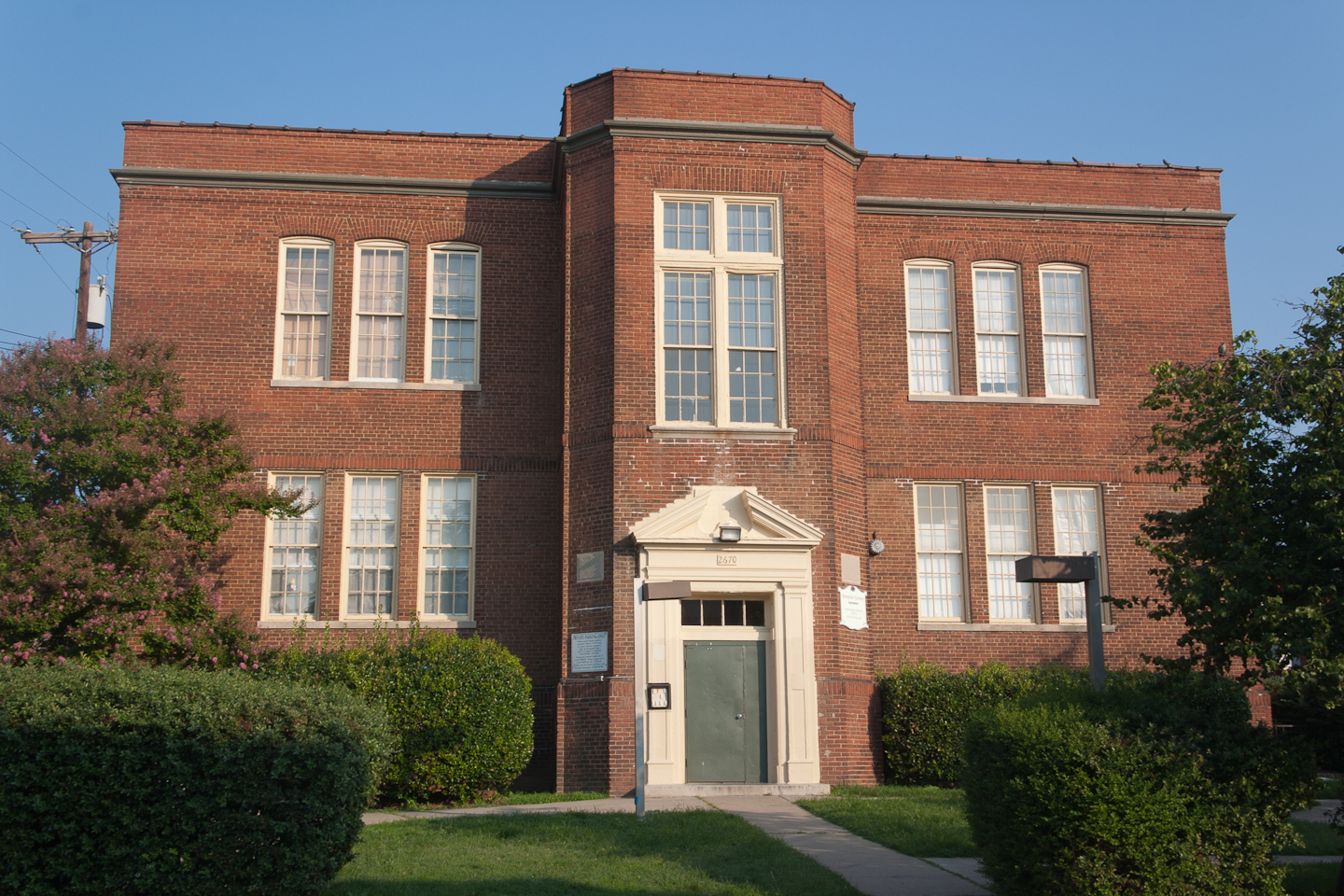
- Clifton School, August 2011

- Location within Baltimore Location within Maryland Location within the United States
- Location: 2670 Kennedy Ave., Baltimore, Maryland
- Coordinates: 39°19′18″N 76°35′46″W
- Area: 0.1 acres (0.040 ha)
- Built: 1882
- Architect: Smith & May
- Architectural style: Colonial Revival
- NRHP reference No.: 82001583
- Added to NRHP: December 16, 1982

Clifton School is a historic elementary school located at Baltimore, Maryland, United States. It is a late 19th-century school with an early 20th-century addition. The structure combines a gable-roofed, "T"-plan, brick county school built in 1882 with a Colonial Revival, flat-roofed, rectangular-plan, brick city school addition built in 1915.

Clifton School was listed on the National Register of Historic Places in 1982.
