= Clifton High School =

Clifton High School may refer to:

== United Kingdom ==
- Clifton High School, Bristol – Clifton, Bristol

== United States ==
- Clifton High School (Clifton, New Jersey) – Clifton, New Jersey
- Clifton High School (Clifton, Arizona) – Clifton, Arizona (closed September 2010)
- Clifton Central High School – Clifton, Illinois
- Lake Clifton Eastern High School – Baltimore, Maryland
- Clifton High School (Clifton, Texas) – Clifton, Texas
- Clifton Forge High School – a former high school in Clifton Forge, Virginia
