= USS Clifton (IX-184) =

United States Navy storage tanker

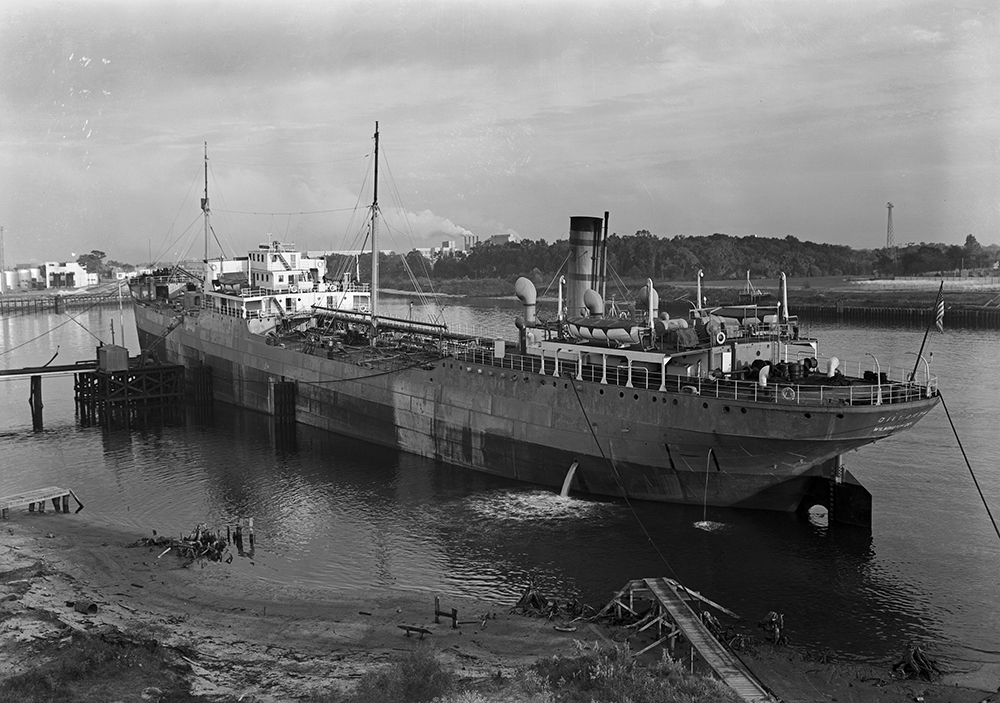
- Dilworth in 1938

History

United States
- Name: SS Dilworth (1919–1945); USS Clifton (1945–1946)
- Builder: Bethlehem Shipbuilding Company, Alameda, California
- Yard number: 5261A
- Launched: 30 June 1919
- Acquired: 31 May 1945
- Commissioned: 2 June 1945
- Decommissioned: 21 February 1946
- Fate: Sold for scrapping, 1947

General characteristics
- Type: Design 1047 tanker
- Displacement: 4,600 long tons (4,674 t) light; 14,493 long tons (14,726 t) full load
- Length: 453 ft (138 m) o/a; 435 ft (133 m) w/l
- Beam: 56 ft (17 m)
- Draft: 27 ft 4 in (8.33 m) full load
- Propulsion: 1 × 2,800 hp (2,088 kW) vertical triple expansion steam engine, 1 screw
- Speed: 10.5 knots (19.4 km/h; 12.1 mph)
- Complement: 70
- Armament: 1 × 4"/50 caliber gun; 1 × 3"/50 caliber gun; 8 × 20 mm guns

USS Clifton (IX-184) was a storage tanker that served in the United States Navy from 1945 to 1946 as an unclassified miscellaneous vessel.

== Service history ==
The ship was built in 1919 at the Bethlehem Shipbuilding Company's Alameda Works, as SS Dilworth, under United States Shipping Board contract No. 1465, as an EFC Design 1047 tank ship.

In October 1943 the Vice Chief of Naval Operations requested that the War Shipping Administration's Auxiliary Vessels Board acquire 35 elderly tankers for use as mobile floating storage ships at advanced bases in the Pacific area. He later directed that these vessels be armed, and equipped with the necessary fittings for use in transferring fuel oil to other vessels.

In August 1944 four of these tankers were assigned to Service Force, Seventh Fleet, in the Southwest Pacific Area. Dilworth and three other ships were sent to Brisbane, Australia, to fulfill this requirement. The vessels were not expected to meet Navy standards, but had to be in good enough condition to travel to the forward area and on arrival be capable of receiving and discharging fuel to other vessels as required.

Dilworth was transferred to the Navy from the War Shipping Administration at Brisbane on 31 May 1945, and commissioned on 2 June as Clifton. She sailed from Brisbane on 13 June, and served as station tanker at Leyte (12 July-2 August), Manila (5–29 August), and Kanoya, Japan (8 September – 2 November). She returned to the United States via Pearl Harbor and San Pedro, California, and arrived at Mobile, Alabama, on 14 January 1946. She was decommissioned there on 21 February and returned to the custody of the War Shipping Administration the same day. She was sold in January 1947, and scrapped by September.
