= Dallas Car Sharks =

- Genre: Reality
- Starring: JD Cole; Martha Davis; Ash Rabah; Tommy Spagnola
- Country of origin: United States
- Original language: English
- No. of seasons: 3
- No. of episodes: 34

Production
- Running time: 30 minutes
- Production company: AMS Pictures

Original release
- Network: Motor Trend
- Release: July 23, 2013 – December 16, 2015

Dallas Car Sharks is an automotive reality show currently airing on Motor Trend that takes place in the Dallas–Fort Worth metroplex. It documents four competing car dealers (JD Cole, Martha Davis, Ash Rabah, and Tommy Spagnola) as they buy used cars at auction, refurbish them, and then attempt to flip (sell) them for a profit. Martha Davis and JD Cole are mother and son, and although they share a garage, their businesses are separate.

The series, which premiered July 22, 2013, is produced by AMS Pictures, with Andy Streitfeld as its executive producer and Randy Martin as its senior producer. In August 2013, Discovery Communications senior vice president Robert Scanlon was promoted to general manager of Velocity, a network that he had helped to grow to No. 46 in the males aged 25–54 demographic with original shows such as Dallas Car Sharks, Fantomworks, and What's in the Barn? Scanlon also helped the network to move up 22 slots and out-deliver competing networks that had larger numbers of subscribers, such as NBA TV, MLB Network, and Golf Channel.

In March 2014, Discovery Communications announced that Dallas Car Sharks would return for its second season on April 2, 2014. Along with other similar programs such as Overhaulin', What's in the Barn?, and Wheeler Dealers, Dallas Car Sharks helped to drive ratings growth for Velocity in the second quarter of 2014, especially among male viewers and in the 25–54 age demographic. In April 2014, Dallas resident Bruce Kahn sued AMS Pictures for breach of fiduciary duty, claiming that the series was his idea and that he is entitled to profit sharing.

The show, along with other automotive reality programs such as Fantomworks, Garage Squad, Graveyard Carz, and West Coast Customs, has drawn criticism for both being too predictable in terms of plot and making automotive restoration look much easier than it actually is.

== Series overview ==
Season	Episodes	Originally released	
Season	Episodes	First released	Last released
1	10	July 23, 2013	September 24, 2013
2	10	April 2, 2014	May 28, 2014
3	14	September 16, 2015	December 16, 2015

== Episodes ==
=== Season 1 ===
Season one premiered on July 22, 2013.

No. overall	No. in season	Title	Original release date
1	1	"Real Rat Rod (Pilot)"	July 23, 2013
Featured cars include a 1992 Chevrolet Camaro and a 1964 Ford Thunderbird.
2	2	"Real Characters"	July 30, 2013
Featured cars include a BMW 3 Series, a 1969 Chevrolet Camaro SS, and a 1999 Plymouth Prowler.
3	3	"Rolling the Dice"	August 6, 2013
A 2000 Ford Crown Victoria police cruiser is featured.
4	4	"Seeing Red"	August 13, 2013
Featured cars include a 1985 Dodge Ram, a 1994 Hummer H1, and a 1977 Jeep CJ5.
5	5	"Rockabilly Rod"	August 20, 2013
Featured cars include a 2000 Chevrolet Camaro convertible and a 1955 Chevrolet.
6	6	"Blast From the Past"	August 27, 2013
Featured cars include a 2000 Chevrolet Silverado, a 1990 Chevrolet Suburban, and a Ford Excursion.
7	7	"Gone Fishin'"	September 3, 2013
A 1966 Chevrolet Impala is featured.
8	8	"Born to Be Wild"	September 10, 2013
Featured cars include a 1984 Mercedes-Benz 380 SL roadster, a Toyota FJ Cruiser, and a vintage Harley-Davidson motorcycle.
9	9	"Pole Position"	September 17, 2013
Featured cars include a 1951 Chevrolet Fleetline and a 1985 Chevrolet truck.
10	10	"What a Drag"	September 24, 2013
Featured cars include Chevrolet Corvettes and a Honda Prelude.

=== Season 2 ===
Season two premiered on April 2, 2014.

No. overall	No. in season	Title	Original release date
11	1	"JD and the Bandit"	April 2, 2014
Featured cars include a 1965 Chevrolet El Camino, a 1978 Pontiac Trans Am, and a 1969 Plymouth Barracuda.
12	2	"Topless Italian Model"	April 2, 2014
Featured cars include a 1988 Alfa Romeo Spider, a 1985 Chevrolet Suburban, a 5.0 Ford Mustang, and a 1966 Volkswagen Beetle.
13	3	"Mad About a Mustang"	April 9, 2014
A 1966 Ford Mustang is featured.
14	4	"BMW Batting Average"	April 16, 2014
Featured cars include a 2007 BMW Alpina B7, a Chevrolet Camaro Z28, a 1961 Chevrolet Corvair, and a Toyota Land Cruiser.
15	5	"Rust Bucket Ranchero Resto"	April 23, 2014
Featured cars include a 1963 Ford Ranchero and a Jeep.
16	6	"Amazing Apache, Restless Renegade"	April 30, 2014
Featured cars include a 1961 Chevrolet Apache and a Jeep Renegade.
17	7	"Gettin' Jigstery With It"	May 7, 2014
Featured cars include a Chevrolet Camaro and a 1962 Chevrolet Greenbrier.
18	8	"Blazing English Comet"	May 14, 2014
Featured cars include a Pontiac Grand Am and a 1950 Vincent Comet motorcycle.
19	9	"Model-A Tudor Makes a Comeback"	May 21, 2014
Featured cars include a 2012 Chevrolet Camaro, a 1958 Ford Custom 300, and a 1929 Ford Model A Tudor.
20	10	"Tommy's Fury: A Richard Petty Restomod"	May 28, 2014
Featured cars include a 1954 Ford Crestline and a 1960 Plymouth Fury.
