= Meteor Studios =

Defunct Canadian animation studio

- Industry: Animation
- Founded: January 2001; 25 years ago
- Founder: Pierre De Lespinois; Discovery Communications, Inc.
- Defunct: November 2007; 18 years ago
- Fate: Closed due to Bankruptcy and Liquidation
- Headquarters: Montreal, Quebec, Canada

Meteor Studios was a Canadian animation studio based in Montreal that worked in computer animation for many films and TV series. Founded in 2001 by American director Pierre De Lespinois and parent company Discovery Communications, the company specialized in creating "realistic CGI on TV budgets". In 2002, it won an Emmy Award in association with the Discovery Channel for Walking With Prehistoric Beasts. By 2005, it was the largest visual effects studio in eastern Canada. Meteor's film credits included movies such as 300, Fantastic Four, Scooby-Doo 2, and Catwoman. After wrapping its first 3D VFX project, Journey to the Center of the Earth, the company shut down in November 2007 without having paid its workers for three months.

== Background ==
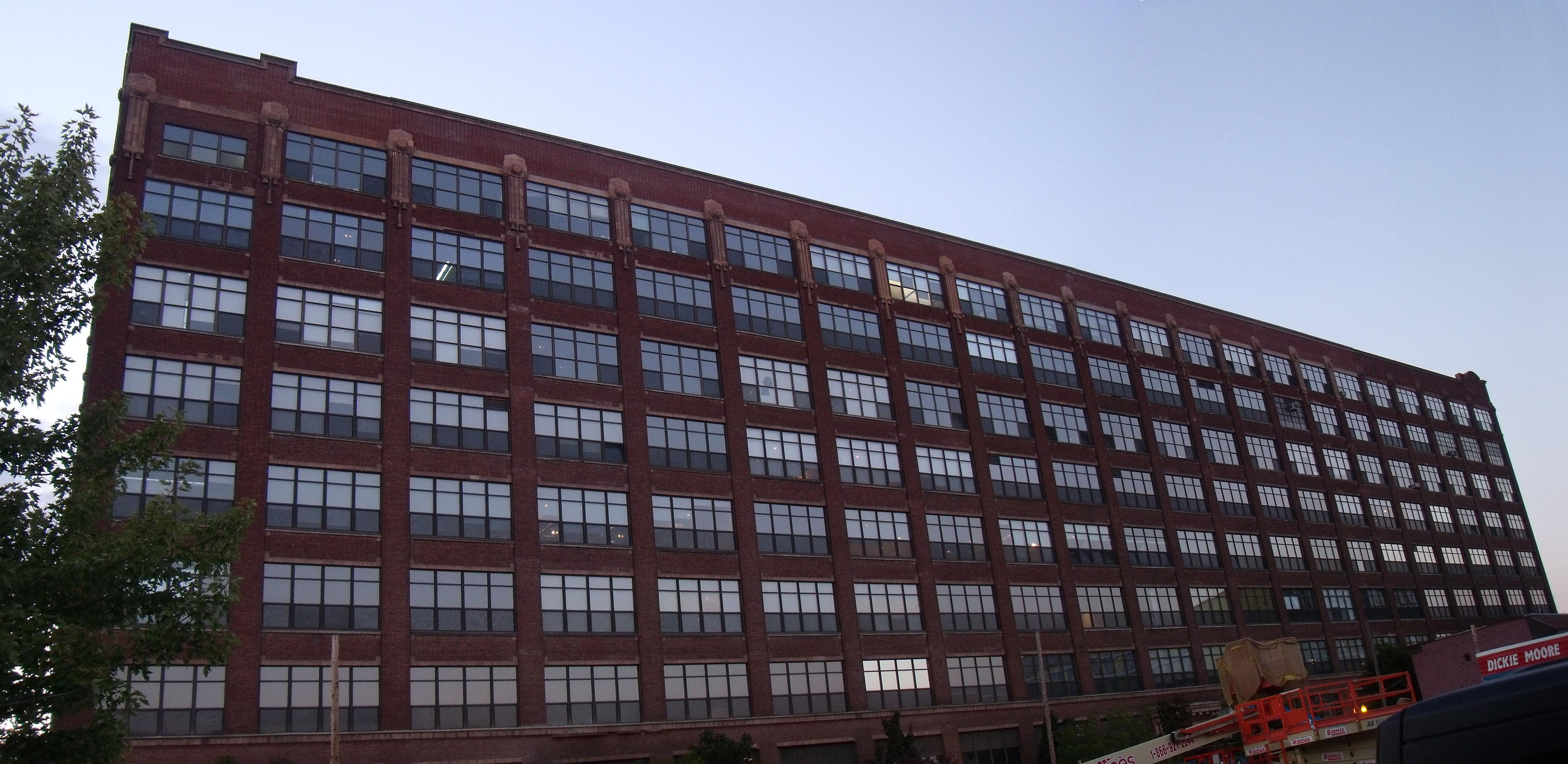
Meteor Studios occupied the seventh floor of the old Northern Electric Building in Montreal

The company was co-founded in January 2001 by director Pierre De Lespinois, who was based in Los Angeles, California, and Discovery Communications, based in Bethesda, Maryland. De Lespinois, who had created the HDTV series, The Secret Adventures of Jules Verne, became president of Meteor Studios, while continuing to run Evergreen Films, his HD live-action company. In the early years, he travelled to Montreal once a month but otherwise worked with the Meteor team remotely.

The initial impetus was to provide a steady supply of cost-effective computer graphics for scientific programming on the Discovery Channel. Meteor Studios built CG libraries of dinosaurs, ancient architecture, and weather phenomena, to create visual effects which had proven popular in movies, for television. By 2005, the company had become the largest visual effects studio in eastern Canada, with many major film projects such as Fantastic Four, in addition to work for TV.

Meteor also saved on costs by using "previsualization" tools to produce test composites in the field after each shot. Rather than waiting until post-production to see how the computer-generated and drawn elements worked together with the actual background and actors, the director was able to assess immediately whether the desired shots had been captured or not, thereby minimizing film crew costs.

The main office was housed in the old Northern Electric Building in Pointe St. Charles near the Lachine Canal in southwestern Montreal, Canada. As of July 2005, The Gazette in Montreal reported that there was a core group of 80 employees at Meteor Studios, but that projects such as Fantastic Four had involved "140 artists working at 'full tilt'". Key employees included head of production François Garcia, and visual effects supervisors Paul Nightingale and Bret St. Clair.

== Projects ==
Its highly rated works included When Dinosaurs Roamed America on the Discovery Channel, which had more than 500 scenes integrating CGI into live-action HD. In 2002, Meteor Studios shared an Emmy Award for Outstanding Animated Program One Hour or More with the Discovery Channel for Walking With Prehistoric Beasts.

For the live-action film Fantastic Four, an adaptation of the Marvel comic book, Meteor produced nine minutes and nine seconds of effects, which Montreal Gazette said had "elevated the shop to another level". The effects included 240 shots for the Brooklyn Bridge sequence in Fantastic Four, which "was actually greeted with real enthusiasm by the jaded brass at 20th Century-Fox in L.A."

For the historical action movie 300, Meteor Studios posted 250 shots to portray liquids, including a large amount of spraying blood.

In 2007, Playback reported that Meteor Studios was venturing into 3D VFX for the first time, for Journey to the Center of the Earth to be released the following year.

== Bankruptcy and aftermath ==
In November 2007, Meteor Studios shut down after wrapping its work on Journey to the Center of the Earth and filed for bankruptcy, leaving 130 employees and freelancers unpaid after postponing their paychecks for three months. In its bankruptcy filing at Quebec Superior Court, Meteor management blamed the Writers Guild of America strike for halting contracts for new projects. Dave Rand, former lead effects artist at Meteor, organized the Meteor Employees Union, which filed a lawsuit in August 2008 to recover $1 million in lost wages. By then, Journey to the Center of the Earth had grossed $102 million at the box office; actor Brendan Fraser, who had starred in the 3D action film, tried to intervene on behalf of the ex-Meteor employees, and made calls to both Evergreen and Discovery.

In September 2008, a new company, Lumière VFX, Inc., launched in Montreal after negotiating with Nordelec to take over the former Meteor Studios facility. Lumière hired a core group of ex-Meteor employees, including Aaron Dem, who became Lumière's president of production.

In September 2009, 130 mainly Canadian artists accepted an offer to recoup 70 per cent of compensation owed to them by Discovery Trademark Holding Co. Inc. and Evergreen Digital LLC, after rejecting two previous offers for 45 per cent and 63 per cent of their missing wages. Variety magazine noted that Meteor Studios had become "a symbol of the shaky standing of the vfx industry and vfx artists in particular", because they lacked representation by any established union or guild, and the visual effects studios themselves sometimes lacked viable business models.

== Filmography ==
- Catwoman (2004)
- Scooby-Doo 2: Monsters Unleashed (2004)
- Exorcist: The Beginning (2004)
- Elektra (2005)
- Fantastic Four (2005)
- Final Destination 3 (2006)
- Slither (2006)
- 300 (2006)
- Journey to the Center of the Earth (2008)

== Television ==
- When Dinosaurs Roamed America (2001)
- Valley of the T-Rex (2001)
- Walking With Prehistoric Beasts (2001)
- Engineering the Impossible (2002)
- Chasing Giants: On the Trail of the Giant Squid (2002)
- Island of the Pygmy Mammoth (2002)
- What Killed the Mega Beasts? (2002)
- Before We Ruled the Earth (2003)
- Extreme Engineering (2003)
- Giant Monsters (2003)
- Dinosaur Planet (2003)
- The Dinosaur Feather Mystery (2004)
- Alien Planet (2005)
- Dino Lab (2006)
- T. rex: New Science, New Beast (2006)
- Baby Mammoth (2007)
