= ToyMakerz =

- Genre: Reality TV
- Starring: David Ankin
- Country of origin: United States
- Original language: English
- No. of seasons: 3
- No. of episodes: 24

Original release
- Release: September 16, 2016 – present

ToyMakerz is an American reality television series featuring David Ankin from Reidsville, North Carolina–based company ToyMakerz LLC as they show their process of building and modifying custom vehicles. The show premiered in 2016 on Velocity and has aired three seasons. ToyMakerz is on The History Channel and FYI.

In each episode, David Ankin and his team design and build motorized creations. Notable works include GPS, a three-quarter scale chain-driven car, the "Beast", a mid-engine formula car and winner of the Magnaflow People's Choice Award at SEMA in Las Vegas in 2017, a four-foot racing drone, and a street-legal dragster. Guest appearances include NASCAR driver Richard Petty, actor Dean Cain, and drag racer Sarah Edwards.

== Series overview ==
Season	Episodes	Originally released	
Season	Episodes	First released	Last released
1	8	September 16, 2016	November 18, 2016
2	8	November 10, 2017	January 12, 2018
3	8	March 10, 2019	September 8, 2019

== Episodes ==
=== Season 1 ===
The first season of the American automotive cable television series ToyMakerz began airing on Velocity in the United States on September 16, 2016, until November 18, 2016 for eight episodes. The series stars David Ankin.

No. overall	No. in season	Title	Original release date	U.S. viewers (millions)
1	1	"GPS and Beyond"	September 16, 2016	N/A
The show introduces David Ankin, the Toymaker. Ankin finishes and test drives his hand fabricated, 3/4 scale mini GP car.
2	2	"Trike Wars"	September 23, 2016	N/A
The ToyMakerz prepare for race day at Summit Point International Speedway where they will compete in a “reverse trike” race.
3	3	"The Four Horsemen"	September 30, 2016	N/A
David Ankin decides to fully customize a limited edition Suzuki Hayabusa. The Toymaker enlists the help of industry veterans Robert Fisher (Roaring Toyz), Brock Davidson (Brock’s Performance) and Charles Joyner (Joyner’s Paint Shop) to complete the one-of-a-kind super bike.
4	4	"Three Generations of ToyMakerz"	October 7, 2016	N/A
The Toymaker’s father and son help build and race a Jr. Dragster.
5	5	"The V8 Vanquish"	October 21, 2016	N/A
A V8 car engine powered motorcycle is created with Mike Kelly of Vanquish V8 Motorcycles. David Ankin and Mike Kelly harness the power of a model V8 car engine into a fully fabricated custom motorcycle.
6	6	"Supercharged: The Camaro"	October 28, 2016	N/A
David Ankin and the ToyMakerz team modify a 5th generation Chevy Camaro with over 900 horsepower.
7	7	"SuperWheelz: Drift or Bust"	November 11, 2016	N/A
The ToyMakerz design, fabricate, test drive and launch a new product called Superwheelz drift trikes.
8	8	"The Ford SB2 Rat Rod"	November 18, 2016	N/A
David Ankin and the team create a full-tube chassis, custom hot rod truck with a NASCAR engine installation.

=== Season 2 ===
The second season of ToyMakerz aired November 10, 2017 and ran until January 12, 2018 on Velocity. It featured eight parts.

No. overall	No. in season	Title	Original release date	U.S. viewers (millions)
9	1	"MOPAR Challenger"	November 10, 2017	N/A
Ankin builds a one-of-a-kind Dodge Challenger for himself then puts it in the GAA Auction to see if his reserve can be beat.
10	2	"Ford Ranchero Street Rod"	November 17, 2017	N/A
David Ankin and the ToyMakerz build a surprise signature ride for their business manager but and must keep it a secret when he makes a visit to the shop.
11	3	"Mustang Super-Tune"	December 1, 2017	N/A
Inspired by a videogame his son Brayden loves to play, the Toymaker & team take a stock Ford Mustang GT and tune it to the limit.
12	4	"Misfit Toyz with Motors"	December 8, 2017	N/A
David Ankin challenges the ToyMakerz crew to build their own high-powered mini rides and take them to the track to test their speed.
13	5	"Overland Rescue Truck"	December 15, 2017	N/A
The ToyMakerz build a rescue vehicle that can rescue other rescue vehicles. In addition, David Ankin brings in the Overland Experts to train his client firsthand.
14	6	"Rally in Raleigh"	December 22, 2017	N/A
The Toymaker hosts the Ray Price Capital City Bike Fest in Raleigh, NC. Once back at home, he soups up a stock Camaro in preparation for a meet up at his local Camaro Club.
15	7	"One-Off Mid-Engine Formula Car “The Beast”"	January 5, 2018	N/A
David Ankin builds a unique 1000 horsepower formula car from scratch and takes it to SEMA where the response is more than expected.
16	8	"ToyMakerz Top Rides"	January 12, 2018	N/A
The ToyMakerz host an Open House and recap their top builds, rides and burnouts as well as showing bloopers and behind the scenes footage.

=== Season 3 ===
The third season aired March 2019 on The History Channel and FYI.

No. overall	No. in season	Title	Original release date	U.S. viewers (millions)
17	1	"'71 Charger - A Richard Petty Tribute"	March 10, 2019	N/A
The team overhauls a '70's Petty Tribute Charger and surprises the owner with a visit from Petty himself.
18	2	"Capital City Bikefest and Car Show"	March 17, 2019	N/A
The team conversts an American V-Twin bagger for the Capital City Bike Fest and Car Show in Raleigh, N.C.
19	3	"'56 International Shop Truck and GoPro Race Day"	March 24, 2019	N/A
A '56 International flatbed truck is converted into a ToyMakerz shop truck and the team takes a day of competitive go-karting.
20	4	"Misfit Toyz Invitational"	March 31, 2019	N/A
Friends of ToyMakerz build unique Misfit Toyz and put them to the test before presenting them to be judged by the crowd.
21	5	"ToyMakerz Drag Races - VW Style"	April 7, 2019	N/A
Ankin upgrades a VW Karmann Ghia to compete at the VW Germanaire drag race in South Carolina.
22	6	"Challenger Mods for Sarah Edwards"	April 14, 2019	N/A
Jet car pilot Sarah Edwards get a new, custom American Dodge Challenger customized by the ToyMakerz.
23	7	"Kraken Monster Truck Debut and Thunder Roadster Road Race"	April 21, 2019	N/A
The team finishes a new monster truck, The Kraken and take us to the Thunder Roadster race at the Virginia International Raceway.
24	8	"'41 Willys Coupe - David's New Exhibition Car"	April 28, 2019	N/A
Ankin builds an over-the-top exhibition car based on a 1941 Willys coupe and receives a visit from actor Dean Cain.
