= HVA =

HVA may refer to:

- Hardin Valley Academy, in Knoxville, Tennessee
- Harlem Village Academies, in Harlem, New York
- Hauptverwaltung Aufklärung, the defunct foreign intelligence service of the German Democratic Republic
- Helmand Valley Authority, Afghanistan
- Historic Vehicle Association, a large North American historic vehicle owners’ organization
- Hogeschool van Amsterdam, a Dutch educational institution
- Homovanillic acid, a major catecholamine metabolite
- Husqvarna Motorcycles, now a subsidiary of BMW, a motorcycle manufacturer
- Hva, a Norwegian word meaning 'what'
