= Desert Car Kings =

- Genre: Reality
- Starring: Jason McClure, Ron McClure
- Narrated by: J. K. Simmons
- Country of origin: United States
- Original language: English
- No. of seasons: 1
- No. of episodes: 10

Production
- Executive producer: Brian Knattmiller
- Production locations: Phoenix, AZ
- Running time: approx. 42 minutes

Original release
- Network: Discovery Channel
- Release: January 26 – March 29, 2011

Desert Car Kings is a reality television series that debuted on the Discovery Channel on January 26, 2011. It is based on the McClure family, who run Desert Valley Auto Parts in Phoenix, Arizona. The show's main characters, Jason and his father Ron, restore classic cars on a limited time-frame; restorations are usually given until their next auction. The operation houses more than 10,000 rust-free vehicles on more than 100 acres of dry Arizona land. Restorations have included a 1965 Ford Thunderbird, a 1970 Oldsmobile 442, a 1962 Ford Galaxie, a 1964 Plymouth Barracuda, a 1955 Ford F-100, and a 1966 Chevrolet Chevelle SS. With average ratings, critics vary in their opinion on the show. Some praise it, others calling it superficial. With its time slot competing with cable television's highest-rated reality show at the time (A&E's, Storage Wars), the show had several factors working against it. Despite the final episode airing over a year earlier, according to a May 6, 2012 Discovery Channel Facebook posting, the show had not been canceled. Finally, an announcement came from Discovery Channel that a second season of Desert Valley Car Kings was not picked up due to production costs. Since its cancellation, it has begun airing reruns on the Velocity cable television network (now known as Motor Trend (TV network)). As of July 2015, it is also airing in the UK on the Quest station (Recorded in 2011 - Some confusion, UK viewers think it is more recent). It is now showing on Pluto TV.

== Episodes ==
No.	Title	Original release date
1	"Parts and Restoration"	January 26, 2011
The McClures clash over restoring a 1965 Thunderbird when there's more to be made dismantling it for parts. Selling affordable classic cars tests the foundations of the family business, but it all comes down to the auction.
2	"Young vs. Olds"	February 2, 2011
Ron challenges Jason and crew to restore a 1970 Oldsmobile 442 from his private lot. Then it's a throw-down between father and son to see who is faster in the newly restored car vs. Ron's personal 442.
3	"Hitchhiker's Guide to Galaxie"	February 9, 2011
The Desert Valley crew races to find a higher horsepower engine for a 1962 Ford Galaxie, one of the precursors to the muscle-car era, while a break-in has the McClures worried about securing their treasure trove of classic cars.
4	"Cuda Woulda Shoulda"	February 16, 2011
Ben, the new shop manager, finds himself in a tight spot after a shop accident breaks the most valuable part of the 1964 Plymouth Barracuda restoration, then the crew lets off some steam in the first ever shop vs. yard demolition derby.
5	"Pickup Line"	February 23, 2011
What Jason McClure thought was a simple 1955 Ford F-100 restoration turns into anything but as a new shop manager and engine problems make the going tough for the Desert Valley Auto Parts crew.
6	"Chevelle SS"	March 2, 2011
Jason strikes gold when he discovers that a 1966 Chevrolet Chevelle he bought is actually a rare SS model. But can the crew find a high roller willing to buy the restored car at their auction?
7	"Drive Like a Champion"	March 9, 2011
The crew at Desert Valley face one of their greatest challenges in the shape of a 1950 Studebaker Champion, when rare parts and urban legends about the car's hidden features send the crew scrambling.
8	"Caddy Shock"	March 16, 2011
A 1950 Cadillac is slow to get moving, and a Route 66 renovation gives Ron a change of heart that surprises everyone.
9	"Pontiac GTO"	March 23, 2011
When Desert Valley gets invited to a prestigious Russo & Steele auction, Ron and Jason decide to roll out the ultimate American muscle car: a Pontiac GTO. With big money on the table, they finally stand to make a bundle.
10	"Charger Showdown"	March 29, 2011
The Desert Valley crew restores a '68 Dodge Charger, the masterpiece of American muscle that once roared through Hazzard. Then it's Charger vs. Charger in a showdown 43 years in the making.
