= Bitchin' Rides =

- Genre: Reality Television
- Starring: Dave Kindig; Kevin Schiele
- Country of origin: United States
- Original language: English
- No. of seasons: 11
- No. of episodes: 146 (not including Season 11)

Production
- Executive producers: Chris Fischer; Nick Meagher; David Lee
- Producers: MotorTrend TV, Fischer Productions
- Running time: 60 minutes

Original release
- Network: Motor Trend
- Release: September 2, 2014 – present

Bitchin' Rides (known outside the United States as Salt Lake Garage in Italy and Kindig Customs elsewhere) is a reality styled Velocity TV show featuring Dave Kindig from the Salt Lake City, Utah-based company Kindig It Designs as they show their process of restoring and rebuilding vehicles. The show was successful in its first season and was on its eighth season while also becoming Velocity's most popular series. Bitchin' Rides can also be watched through VELOCITY, now known as Motor Trend OnDemand.

In each episode, Kindig and his team meet a client, review a car, create a design, then the team takes apart and rebuilds the vehicle to create a masterpiece. Featured projects include a '33 Ford Tudor, '57 Chevrolet Corvette, an Audi R8 Spyder, a '69 Chevrolet Camaro, a '62 Volkswagen bus and GM Futurliner #3.

On October 8, 2020, it was announced that the seventh season will premiere on October 21, 2020.

The eighth season began streaming September 28, 2021, on Motor Trend OnDemand with 14 episodes.

The ninth season premiered on October 4, 2022, on Motor Trend with 20 episodes.

The tenth season aired from October 3, 2023, to January 2, 2024, comprising twenty (20) episodes.

The first episode of season 11 aired on March 12, 2025.
