= When Dinosaurs Roamed America =

- Genre: Nature Documentary
- Written by: Georgann Kane
- Directed by: Pierre de Lespinois
- Narrated by: John Goodman
- Composer: Christopher Franke
- Country of origin: United States
- Original language: English
- No. of episodes: 1

Production
- Executive producers: Pierre de Lespinois; Fran LoCascio
- Producer: John Copeland
- Editor: Barrett Sanders
- Running time: 91 minutes
- Production company: Evergreen Films

Original release
- Network: Discovery Channel
- Release: July 15, 2001

When Dinosaurs Roamed America (sometimes shortened to When Dinosaurs Roamed outside of the United States) is a two-hour American television program that premiered on the Discovery Channel on July 15, 2001. Presented in the style of a traditional nature documentary, the program chronicles the evolution and diversity of non-avian dinosaurs in North America over more than 160 million years. It is divided into five segments, each depicting a distinct prehistoric environment and its associated flora and fauna.

When Dinosaurs Roamed America premiered to an audience of 5 million viewers and was featured numerous times in the Discovery HD Theater's 2002 programming lineup. It was released on VHS and DVD in August 2001, followed by several subsequent DVD reissues. In 2011, the program also received a limited Region 2 Blu-ray release bundled with Valley of the T. rex.

== Production ==
When Dinosaurs Roamed America was directed by Pierre de Lespinois with Evergreen Films, and was narrated by actor John Goodman (voice of Rex in We're Back! A Dinosaur’s Story and Fred Flintstone from the 1994 film). The featured dinosaurs were designed by paleoartist and art director Mark Dubeau, noted for creating dinosaurs for many other Discovery Channel and National Geographic specials. The dinosaur animation was accomplished by animator Don Waller at Meteor Studios, in Montreal, Canada, while the music was composed by Christopher Franke (ex-member from Tangerine Dream). Unlike Walking with Dinosaurs, the show's creatures are almost entirely composed of computer-generated imagery, and is also one of the first documentaries to depict dromaeosaurs and therizinosaurs with nearly full coats of feathers.

The program was shot in high definition for better portability and quality. Exotic HD cameras were rare at the time, which made reaching some of the filming locations for When Dinosaurs Roamed America (which include various parts of Argentina, Tasmania, and Florida) difficult, but the portable HD cameras allowed de Lespinois and his small team to capture never-before-seen shots of the various landscapes. The show was edited using an offline system rather than online. Animation was done using Final Cut Pro over the course of six months.

=== Marketing ===
When Dinosaurs Roamed America was first revealed on the Discovery website in June 2001, originally with a July 13 airdate set. It was also announced that clips from the program would be added to the website for the upcoming show. Nine different clips were available, which showed bits of the five segments of When Dinosaurs Roamed America. The site for When Dinosaurs Roamed America lasted until September 2008, when it became a redirect to the main Dinosaurs page on the Discovery website.

== Synopsis ==
=== Late Triassic segment (220 million years ago) ===
The program starts in the Late Triassic, between the Norian and Rhaetian stages, near modern-day New York City in the Newark Supergroup. The narrator explains how the Permian mass extinction led to new forms of life, including, eventually, the most extraordinary creatures ever to walk the planet: the Dinosaurs. The camera tracks a Coelophysis through the woods, as the program depicts it preying mainly on small animals, such as insects and Icarosaurus. It also encounters other, larger non-dinosaurian archosaurs such as Rutiodon and Desmatosuchus (mispronounced as "Demastosuchus"; the subtitles accommodated this mispronunciation by misspelling as "Dematosuchus"). The quick and agile Coelophysis is portrayed as a very successful inhabitant of this world.

=== Early Jurassic segment (200 million years ago) ===
The program moves on to the Early Jurassic of Pennsylvania, between the Sinemurian and Toarcian stages, showing a pack of Syntarsus. (Note: Coelophysis? kayentakatae is referred to in this program as Syntarsus.) These dinosaurs are closely related to Coelophysis. They are hunting the primitive herbivorous dinosaur Anchisaurus; only to be chased away by a Dilophosaurus, which kills the Anchisaurus to feed its young. The narrator then explains Syntarsus and Dilophosaurus will become gigantic carnivores like Allosaurus and Tyrannosaurus, while Anchisaurus will become the massive sauropods.

=== Late Jurassic segment (150 million years ago) ===
The show skips to Utah during the Late Jurassic period, near the end of the Tithonian stage (all centering the Morrison Formation). The region has been engulfed by a severe drought as the seasonal rain has failed to arrive. A predatory Ceratosaurus stalks a family of Dryosaurus, including a mother and two youngsters. The predator eventually breaks its cover and charges after the small dinosaurs as they scatter. The Dryosaurus can only flee but the Ceratosaurus is quicker than they are and catches up, grabbing and killing one of the juveniles. The Ceratosaurus feasts while the others escape into a grove of pine trees and run into a herd of sauropods called Camarasaurus. They will be safe around the gentle giants. A male Stegosaurus fights off the attacking Ceratosaurus, the same individual from the earlier sequence, later on using his spiked tail and follows a female Stegosaurus, displaying his plates. Eventually, the female decides that he is a healthy individual and the two mate. With the onset of the rainy season, a herd of Apatosaurus arrive, followed by a hungry Allosaurus who launches an assault against the herd while the sauropods graze but is unsuccessful due to their size and strength. The Allosaurus subsequently attacks and kills the Ceratosaurus that attacked the Dryosaurus and finally is able to feed. Later while on the move, one Apatosaurus tumbles off of a 20-foot-high cliff. The sauropod is injured with a broken leg, and its agonized bellowing is picked up by a trio pack of Allosaurus, which proceed to hunt the sauropod.

=== Mid Cretaceous segment (90 million years ago) ===
The program then shows a forest located in New Mexico during the Middle Cretaceous period, during the Turonian stage (all centering the Moreno Hill Formation). Small predatory coelurosaurs (now identified as the tyrannosauroid Suskityrannus) scamper through the foliage and steal pieces of meat from a dead Zuniceratops, which had been killed by a pack of dromaeosaurs (based on an earlier, erroneous interpretation of the Suskityrannus fossils). The pack drive away a lone individual who tries to steal some meat. The lone dromaeosaur tries to attack a grazing Nothronychus, only to be slashed by its long claws and knocked over. Uninjured, the raptor retreats. The dominant male Zuniceratops is battling for mating rights with a younger but healthier male whilst the herd members look on. The younger dinosaur gores the older herd leader with his right horn, wounding his frill. The sounds of battle are picked up by raptors and the hungry creatures follow the sounds to a clearing and watch from the foliage as the battle plays out before attacking.

The injured old Zuniceratops is attacked by the pack of dromaeosaurs and is fatally wounded. Another Zuniceratops headbutts the attacking dromaeosaur and tosses it off the struggling male. The dromaeosaurs retreat, but the old Zuniceratops will not last long. Weeks later, a thunderstorm rolls in and lightning illuminates the darkened skies. Panicked dinosaurs scatter but the old Zuniceratops cannot get up. As he sounds his distress call, the dromaeosaurs return joined by a fourth member and surround the wounded dinosaur. The raptors attack and soon kill him. Meanwhile, lightning ignites the dry vegetation. Fire springs up, and most of the dinosaurs scatter in all directions. Zuniceratops panic for safety and the Nothronychus follows, but the feasting dromaeosaurs are too distracted by eating and fire surrounds the region. The four dromaeosaurs burn to death along with their prey, but some other dromaeosaurs do flee and make it to safety along with some of the other creatures.

=== Late Cretaceous segment (65 million years ago) ===
The program explains that dinosaurs similar to Zuniceratops evolved into the famous Triceratops. In the Late Cretaceous, at the end of the Maastrichtian stage, near Mount Rushmore in South Dakota (specifically Bone Butte), Anatotitan and Triceratops browse on a rolling grassland bordered by tropical jungle-like forests, while Ornithomimus peck at roots and other plants in the area. Flying pterosaurs such as Quetzalcoatlus; the biggest of them all, soar overhead, looking for carcasses. A young Tyrannosaurus rex arrives on the scene, and the Triceratops herd form a defensive circle around the juveniles, displaying their powerful horns whilst the Tyrannosaurus attempts to get through and repeatedly roars. Unable to get past the defensive horns of the Triceratops, the Tyrannosaurus ambushes a Quetzalcoatlus, but the pterosaur launches off and flies away from the hungry theropod. The Tyrannosaurus goes back into the trees and the Triceratops become less agitated.

At night, the young Tyrannosaurus returns to its family, and the mother Tyrannosaurus chastises two of her young after they hit her scarred leg while sparring. The next day, the young Tyrannosaurus and its siblings are taught by their parents to hunt. They target a herd of Anatotitan grazing in a forest clearing and after bursting from the trees, the herd scatters. The three juvenile and father Tyrannosaurus chase after one Anatotitan and it runs straight to where the mother emerges from the bushes, grabs the unfortunate hadrosaur, and kills it by breaking its neck.

As they begin to feast, a huge asteroid, 6 miles across, hurtles towards the planet at 45,000 miles an hour and as it enters the atmosphere friction turns it into a blazing missile. The asteroid crosses the ocean in just 4 minutes, crashing into the Gulf of Mexico. The impact gouges out a crater 120 miles wide and sends an incandescent plume of vaporized rock, dust and ash into the atmosphere which falls back to earth as fiery debris. The blast wave radiates outward from the impact in a circle and in minutes, everything for hundreds of miles is incinerated by the intense heat or blown apart by the blast wave. Dinosaurs in the region are vaporized in a matter of minutes.

In North America, plants and animals suffer a different fate. Some are incinerated by the mounting heat whilst others succumb to shock waves generated by the collision. Fleeing Triceratops and Anatotitan are caught by the speeding ejecta cloud and destroyed. The feasting Tyrannosaurus watch in horror as a burning blast wave hurtles towards them and flee as pieces of fiery rock rain down. Eventually, all the region's dinosaurs die, including the Tyrannosaurus family. A few hours after impact, a heavy cloud of dust and ash settles over America, and temperatures drop as sunlight and heat can no longer reach the surface of the planet. Gasses such as nitrogen and carbon dioxide are burned by the heat and are washed out of the atmosphere as acid rain.

Two months after impact, the sun finally reaches the surface as the heavy cloud of ash clears away. The disaster is over, but 90% of all leaf-bearing trees, ferns, vines and plants have been obliterated, and 70% of the animals have vanished. Most of the dinosaurs are now extinct.

Despite the depressing and traumatic event, life is described as being resilient, and a turtle is shown emerging from the water and a bird flies overhead, explained by the narrator as the only dinosaurs left. Out of the ashes and charred debris, several small possum-like mammals emerge, and the narrator explains that small mammals such as these will eventually evolve into humans, "and think back in awe to a time... when dinosaurs roamed america".

== Reception ==
Tom Shales of The Washington Post wrote that When Dinosaurs Roamed America was 'hugely entertaining'.

== Awards and nominations ==
- Primetime Emmy Award

2002 - Outstanding Sound Editing for Non-Fiction Programming (Single or Multi-Camera) Michael Payne, David Esparza, Nancy Nugent and Jonathan Wareham (Won)
2002 - Outstanding Outstanding Animated Program (For Programming One Hour or More) Pierre de Lespinois, Fran Lo Cascio, Tomi Bednar Landis, John Copeland, Georgann Kane, and Don Waller (Nominated)
