= GM Futurliner =

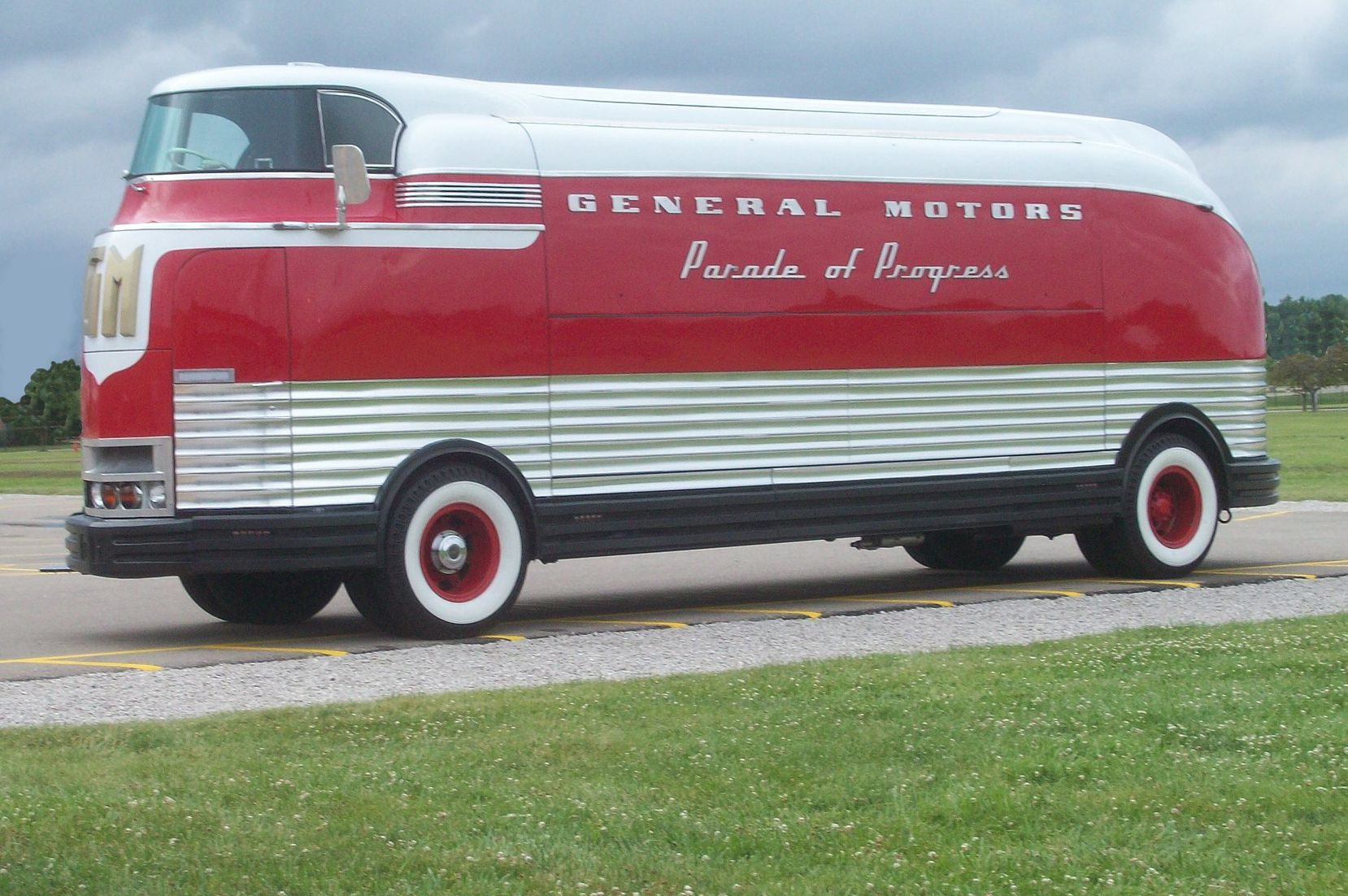
- GM Futurliner at Flint, Michigan in 2011

Overview
- Manufacturer: General Motors
- Production: 1936–1941, 1953–1956
- Designer: Harley Earl

Powertrain
- Engine: 4-cylinder Diesel (1940–1946); GMC 302ci 6-cylinder (1953–1956)
- Transmission: Manual (1940–1946); 4-speed Hydramatic and 2-speed manual gearbox (1953–1956)

Dimensions
- Wheelbase: 248 inches (6.3 meters)
- Length: 33 feet (10 meters)
- Width: 96 inches (2.4 meters)
- Height: 11 feet 7 inches (3.53 meters)
- Curb weight: 33,000 pounds (15 metric tons) (approx)

The GM Futurliners were a group of custom vehicles, styled in the 1940s by Harley Earl for General Motors, and integral to the company's Parade of Progress—a North American traveling exhibition promoting future cars and technologies. Having earlier used eight custom Streamliners from 1936 to 1940, GM sponsored the Parade of Progress and the Futurliners from 1940 to 1941 and again from 1953 to 1956.

At 33 feet long, 8 feet wide, more than 11 feet tall, and weighing more than 12 tons, each Futurliner featured heavily stylized Art Deco, streamlined bodywork, deep red side and white roof paint, large articulated chrome side panels, a military-grade 302 cubic inch GMC straight-six gasoline engine and automatic transmission, whitewall tires and a prominent, high-mounted, centrally located driver command position with a panoramic windshield. A rarely seen technical feature was that the front wheels, in addition to rear, were also dual wheels.

Of the twelve original Futurliners, one was destroyed in a 1956 accident, and nine were known to survive as of 2007. The status and location of several are unknown.

In 2014, Futurliner #10 was nominated for inclusion in the National Historic Vehicle Register.

== Parade of Progress ==
Originally manufactured for the 1939 New York World's Fair, the Futurliners were later featured in GM's Parade of Progress, a promotional caravan travelling a 150-stop route across the United States and Canada. The Futurliners, along with 32 support vehicles, were driven by 50 college graduates, who also staffed the exhibitions along the route.

Typically arranged at each stop around a large tent and an information kiosk, each Futurliner featured a self-contained stage as well as a prominent deployable light tower, and each vehicle carried an exhibit featuring a single theme. The mobile exhibition covered such topics as jet engine technology, agriculture, traffic engineering, stereophonic sound, microwave ovens, television and other innovations.

Interrupted by World War II, the vehicles were refurbished by GM and the Parade of Progress resumed in 1953. The 1953 Parade started in April 1953 with rehearsals in Lexington and Frankfort, Kentucky, followed by the premiere in Dayton, Ohio. It included 44 vehicles in total — the 12 Futurliners, 14 trucks, and 18 cars. In 1955 a miniature automobile assembly line display named A Car Is Born was constructed for one of the Futurliners. A display titled Our American Crossroads was also used in 1955. This display was narrated by Parker Fennelly and featured a complicated animated diorama that transformed to show progress in road and infrastructure improvements from 1902 to 1953. The reborn parade was discontinued in 1956 for the last time, displaced by increasing popularity of network television, one of the very technologies the Futurliners had once promoted.

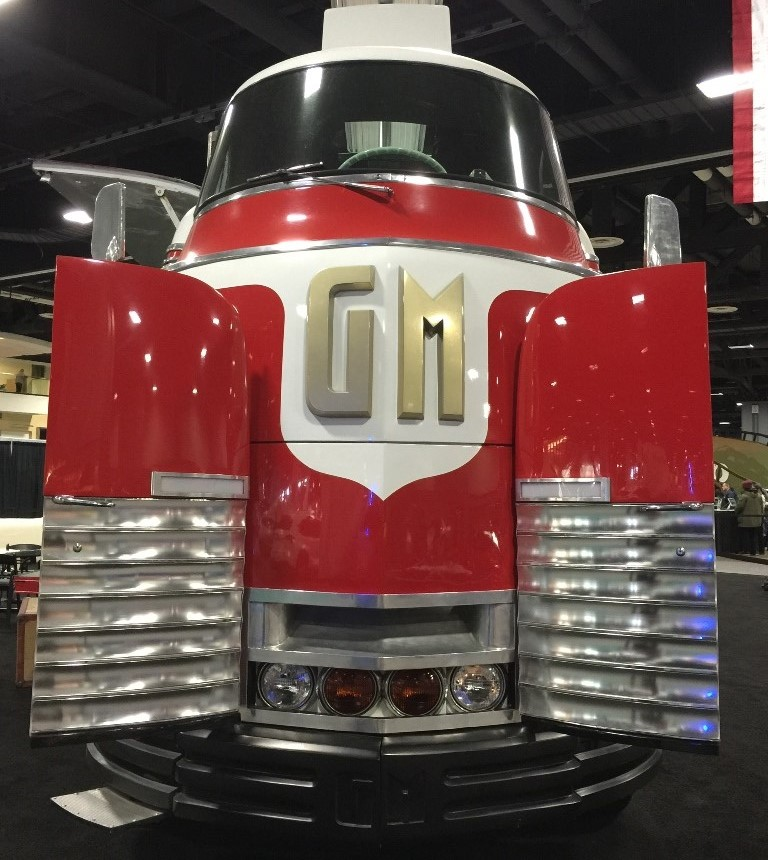
Futurliner number 10 on display with doors open

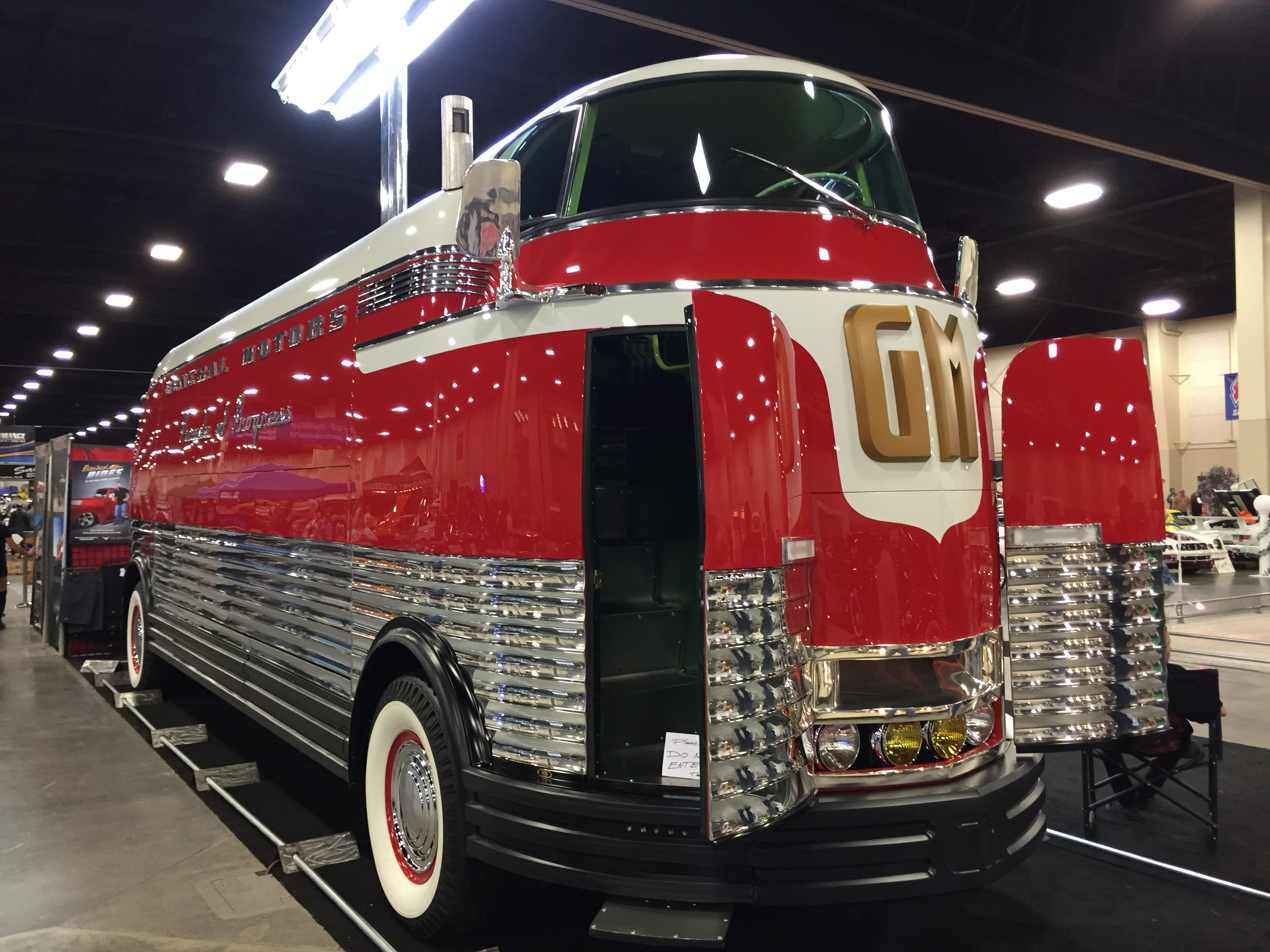
Front right of Futurliner #3 on display in Salt Lake City, Utah

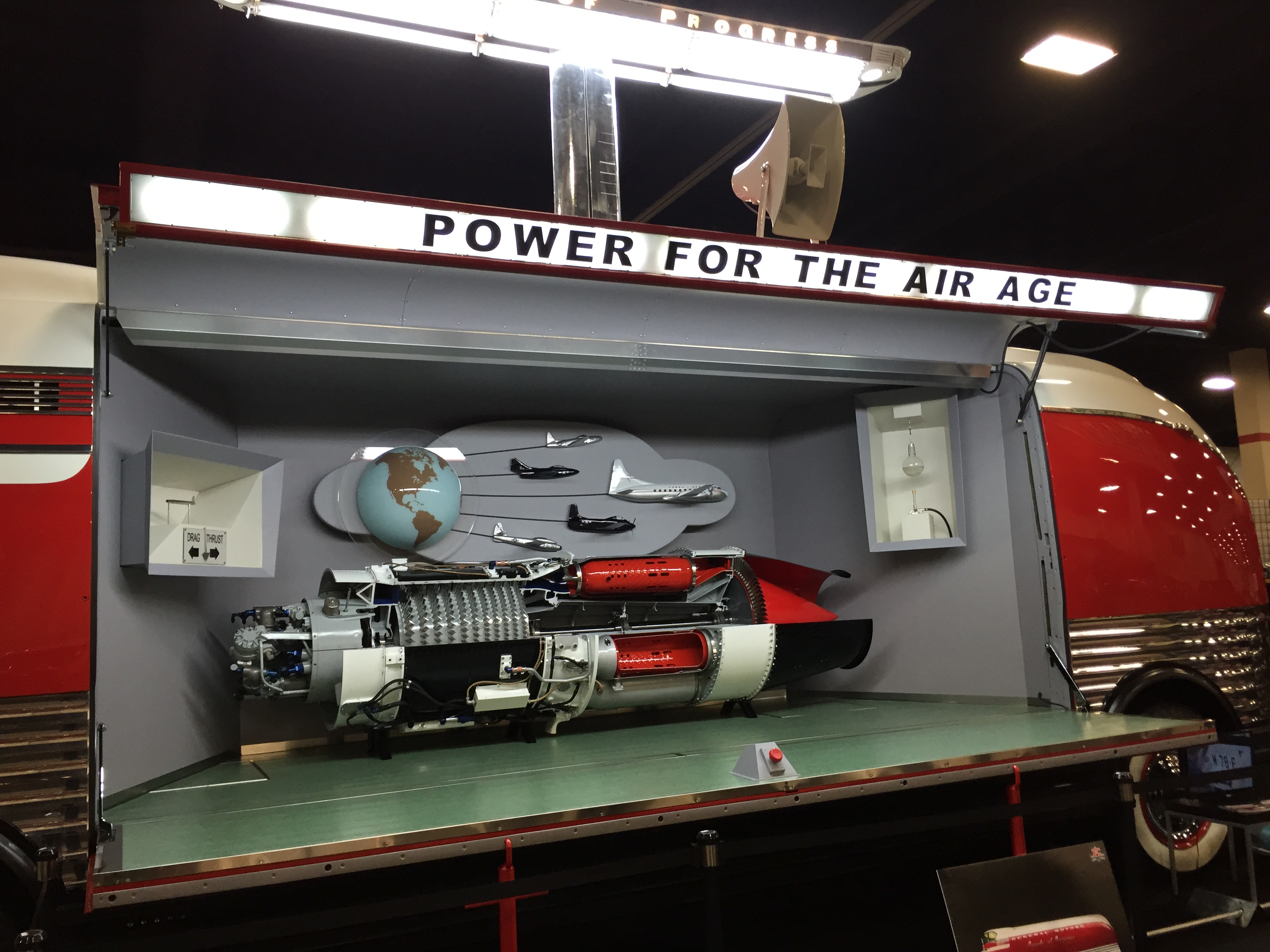
Futurliner #3 on display in Salt Lake City, Utah

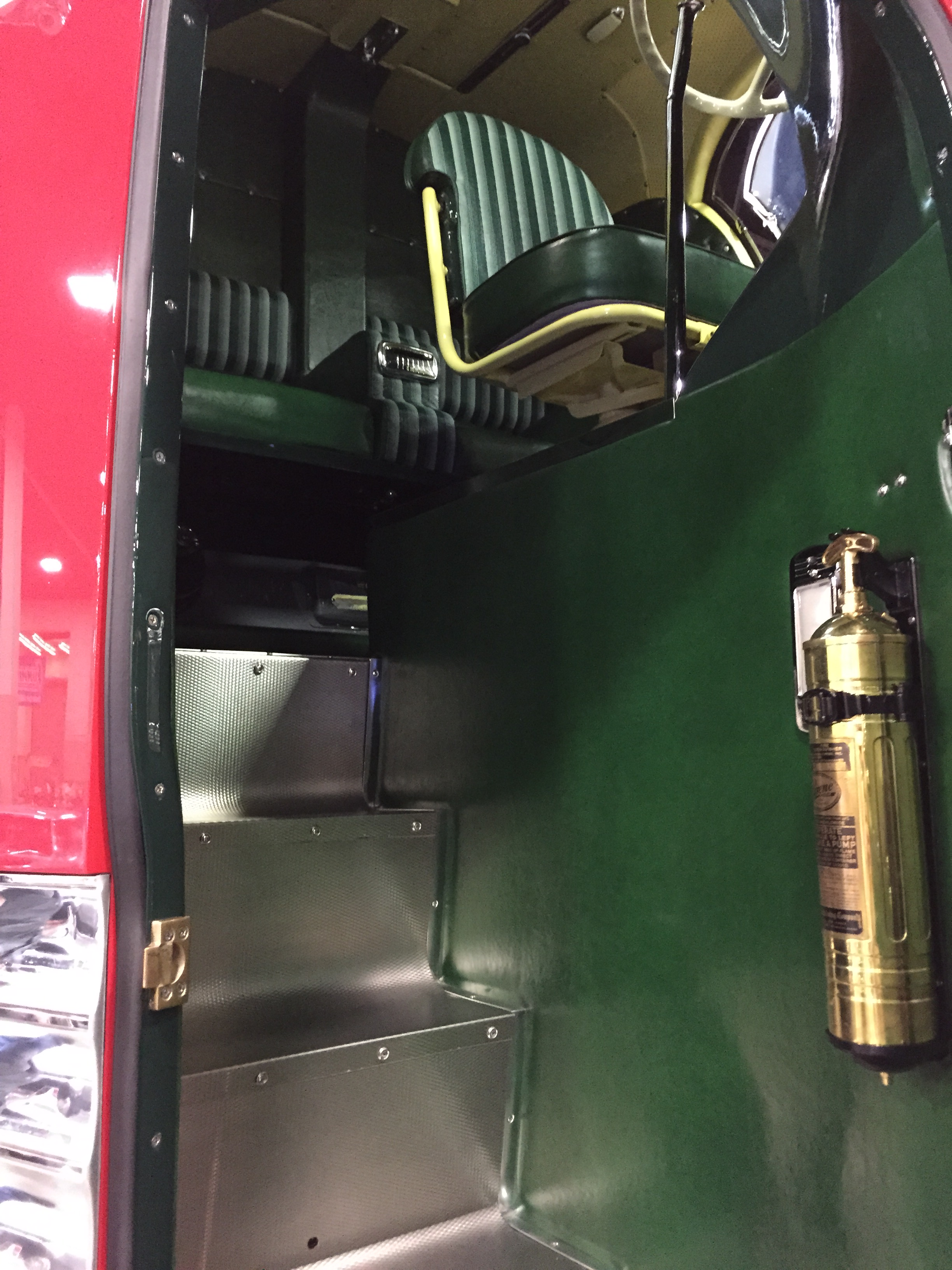
Cabin of Futurliner #3 on display in Salt Lake City, Utah

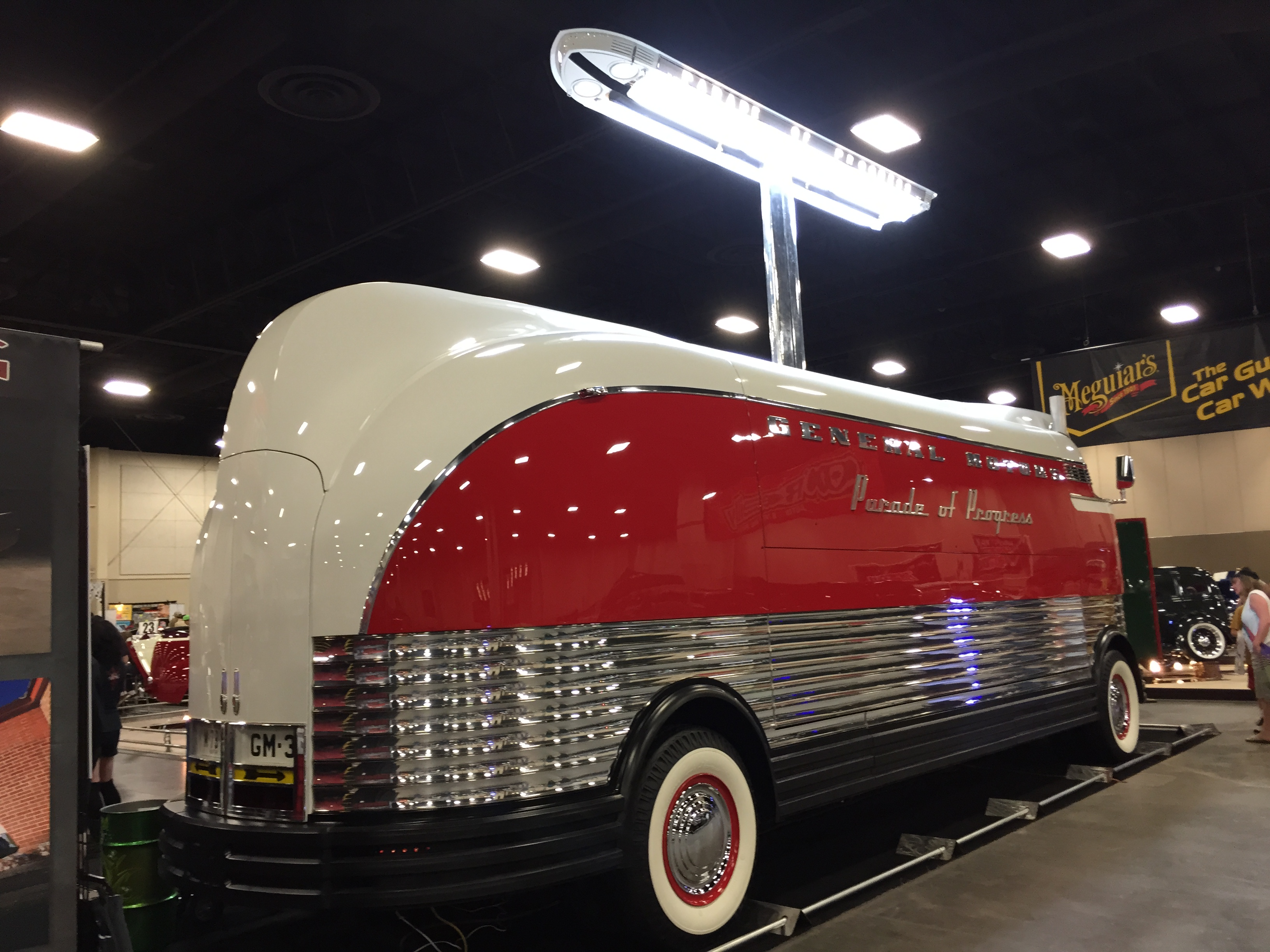
Right rear of Futurliner #3 on display in Salt Lake City, Utah

== Mechanical ==
The original powertrain for the Futurliners was a four-cylinder diesel coupled to a four-speed manual transmission, giving the vehicles a top speed of approximately 40 mph (64 km/h).

When the Parade of Progress resumed in 1953, the Futurliners were refurbished by fitting a six-cylinder, 302 cubic-inch engine, along with a four-speed automatic transmission and gear splitter; a metal roof was added to the glass cabin and air conditioning was fitted to reduce heat. The air conditioning units were manufactured by Frigidaire.

The driver's seat is centrally mounted at the front of the cab, with the driver's eyes at approximately 10 ft (3.0 m) above road level, and the cab has room for two passengers. The 302 cu in (4,950 cc; 4.95 L) six cylinder gasoline engine refitted in 1953 had a rated output of 145 hp (108 kW) and 262 lb⋅ft (355 N⋅m) of torque at 1,400 RPM, with a compression ratio of 7.5:1.

== List of Futurliners ==
The following table lists the original displays and the current status of the units. The three vehicles listed as unknown under Fate does not mean that they no longer exist but rather that the identity of some of the existing Futurliners has not been matched to their original display. Changes in some of the displays also makes it difficult to trace the lineage of some of the buses.

There are still two Futurliners unaccounted for.

List of Futurliners originally built for the 1941 Parade of Progress
Number	Image	Original Display	Remarks	Current location
1		Miracles of Heat and Cold	Displayed the "Miracles of Heat and Cold" exhibit, featuring Frigidaire products.	Unknown
2		Our American Crossroads	Displayed the “Our American Crossroads” exhibit. GM retained the exhibit at the end of the Parade of Progress. The exhibit of this Futurliner is kept at the General Motors Heritage Center in Sterling Heights, Michigan. The whereabouts of the vehicle itself are unknown.	Unknown
3		Power for the Air Age	Displayed the “Power for the Air Age” exhibit, featuring a cutaway Allison J-35 jet engine and passed through the Joe Bortz collection in the 1980s. It later sat in storage in a warehouse in Dana, Indiana, before Phoenix, Arizona, resident William Pozzi bought it and in turn sold it sometime in the late 1990s to Brad Boyajian of American Movie Trucks in Chatsworth, California. In 2011, Boyajian sold it to Rick and Amy White, who employed Kindig-It Design in 2013–2014 to restore it. Rick White is the co-founder of Fusion-IO, a computer hardware and software company, and then co-founder of Primary Data. Rick had previously had Kindig-It Design customize a VW 23 window bus with a Fusion-IO theme. The restoration of Futurliner No. 3 was the subject of two episodes of the Velocity Channel show Bitchin' Rides. The 2 shows were Season 1 Episodes 9 & 10 and originally aired back to back on Oct. 28, 2014. It underwent a 19-month restoration, intended to be the most authentic, complete, and period-correct restoration of all that have been attempted so far. In August 2016 the Futurliner was consigned to Motorsport Auction Group's inaugural Hot August Nights auction in Reno. At $2.6 million it failed to meet reserve. Negotiations reportedly continued afterward. In 2017 No. 3 was offered for sale in the Hemmings.com classifieds by Ardell Brown Classic Cars for an undisclosed asking price. As of 2018 No. 3 resides in the Dennis Albaugh Collection.	Dennis Albaugh Collection
4		Diesel Power Parade	Displayed the “Diesel Power Parade” exhibit; also displayed the “Power for the Nation’s Lifelines” exhibit, which also focused on diesels. Current whereabouts unknown.	Unknown
5		World of Science	Displayed the “World of Science” exhibit; also displayed the “Versatile Metal Powder” exhibit. Purchased by Brad Boyajian in 2002. Boyajian said he believes that the Futurliner that he converted into a custom flatbed car hauler is No. 5, powered by a 230 Cummins diesel. Futurliner No. 5's rear axle and body section went with Futurliner No. 8 to Sweden, and its front axle went to the NATMUS Futurliner No. 10 restoration project. As of 2018 Futureliner #5 has been sold to ChromeCars in Germany, the 3rd Futurliner they have purchased and transplanted to Germany.	ChromeCars (Germany)
6		Energy & Man	Displayed the "Energy & Man" exhibit; also displayed the "High Compression Power & Energy" exhibit. Current whereabouts unknown.	Unknown
7		Out of the City Muddle	Displayed the “Out of the City Muddle” exhibit, focusing on urban and highway congestion. According to Tom Picknally of Peter Pan Bus Lines, it was owned by Peter Pan Bus Lines, painted in red and white (previously in the green and white Peter Pan livery) and powered by a Detroit Diesel 4-71 engine. The restored Futurliner was bought out of a cornfield in upstate New York in 1997. Peter Pan rents the Futurliner out for events as a promotional vehicle. The overhead pod light that extends out of the roof needs to be repaired and parts may be used from the other Futurliner which is described as a carcass according to John Cieplik, general manager of Peter Pan Coach Builders. In 2024, Peter Pan sold No. 7 to the Caretakers Collection who commissioned Rob Ida to restore it back to its original 1939 design. This restoration was completed in 2026. However, according to Tom Learned, his Futurliner had numerous "No. 7" markings. According to Berghoff and Ferris, this Futurliner was at one time a demonstration vehicle for Square D and spent time in Waterford, Maine and southeast New Hampshire. In 2017 Learned sold No. 7 to ChromeCars in Germany, the same owner of No. 9, who shipped it to Ilmenau, Germany.	ChromeCars (Germany)
8		Around the Farm House Clock	Displayed the “Around the Farm House Clock” exhibit, focusing on the use of modern appliances on the farm. This bus was rear-ended while on the Parade of Progress, and removed from use. One of two (#11) given to the Michigan State Police, then later sold to Jack and Bill Braun of Spring Lake, Michigan, to promote their junkyard. In the mid-1980s it was sold to Brent Knight of Roselle, Illinois; in the late 1990s, found in a junkyard in Yuma, Arizona. Sold to William Pozzi; later sold to Brad Boyajian with No. 3. Boyajian sold it to Nicklas Jonsson of Sweden. Under restoration as of March 2018.	Nicklas Jonsson (Sweden)
9		Reception Center	Hosted the exhibit reception center. No. 9 was previously restored and modified by Bob Valdez of Sherman Oaks, California. Valdez's Futurliner was reportedly once used as a Makita Tool Display Van and possibly used as an executive motor home before Valdez bought it in 1984. In 2016 Valdez sold No. 9 to ChromeCars in Germany. As of 2018 it remains at ChromeCars of Germany, who is currently working on restoring No. 9.	ChromeCars (Germany)
10		Opportunity for Youth	Displayed the “Opportunity for Youth” exhibit, which included winning model cars from the Fisher Body Craftsman's Guild contest; also displayed the Three Dimensional Sound exhibit. Initially sold to musician Vic Hyde, then later toured the Midwest promoting Goebel beer and also promoting Dreisbach and Sons Cadillac-Chevrolet-Oldsmobile in Detroit. Passed through the Joe Bortz collection in the 1980s, donated to the National Automotive and Truck Museum in 1993. Restored by Don Mayton and his team beginning in 1999. Currently on display at NATMUS except for occasional excursions to auto shows.	NATMUS
11		March of Tools	Displayed the “March of Tools” exhibit; also displayed the “A Car is Born” exhibit. According to Berghoff and Ferris, GM sold it to evangelist Oral Roberts, who in turn sold it to preacher David Wilkerson. Later ended up in a field in East Meredith, New York. Futurliner Bus No. 11 sold for a record US$4,000,000 (plus premium) to Arizona-based real estate developer Ron Pratte on January 21, 2006 at a Barrett-Jackson auction in Arizona and was driven to its new home in Chandler. Mr. Pratte sold the same bus on January 17, 2015 at Barrett-Jackson Auto Auction in Scottsdale, Arizona to an anonymous donor. The selling price was again US$4,000,000 (plus premium), the proceeds from the sale benefiting the Armed Forces Foundation, a charity that assists military members and their families. Tom Picknally claims that No. 11 is a parts shell owned by Peter Pan Bus Lines as a source of parts for No. 7.	Private owner
12		Precision and Durability	Displayed the “Precision and Durability” exhibit. Current whereabouts unknown.	Unknown

== See also ==
- List of buses
