= Discovery Turbo (United States) =

American automotive television network

- Country: United States
- Broadcast area: United States
- Headquarters: El Segundo, California

Programming
- Language: English
- Picture format: 1080i HDTV

Ownership
- Parent: Skydance TV
- Sister channels: see list of assets owned by Skydance Corporation

History
- Launched: June 17, 2002; 24 years ago
- Former names: Discovery HD Theater; (2002–2007); HD Theater; (2007–2011); Velocity; (2011–2018); Motor Trend; (2018–2026)

Links
- Website: go.discovery.com/network/vel

Availability

Streaming media
- Affiliated Streaming Service(s): Discovery+ and HBO Max
- Service(s): Philo, Hulu with Live TV, Sling TV, YouTube TV, DirecTV Stream, Vidgo

Discovery Turbo is an American pay television network owned by Skydance Corporation. It primarily broadcasts automotive-themed programming, including motorsports events.

It was originally founded in 2002 as Discovery HD Theater (later HD Theater), the first 24/7 high-definition basic cable network. It featured high-definition programming from its other channels.

Redundant after the introduction of high-definition simulcasts for Discovery's networks, it re-launched in 2011 as Velocity—an "upscale male" network primarily featuring automotive programming.

Following Discovery's acquisition of a majority stake in Motor Trend Group, it was announced that Velocity would rebrand as Motor Trend on November 23, 2018, named after the automotive magazine of the same name. After the Motor Trend Group was sold to the magazine division of Hearst Communications, the channel was renamed Discovery Turbo on January 9, 2026, serving as an extension of the international Discovery Turbo brand.

As of November 2023, Discovery Turbo is available to approximately 65,000,000 pay television households in the United States, down from its 2017 peak of 74,000,000 households.

== History ==
=== As HD Theater ===
The network launched nationwide in the United States on June 17, 2002, as Discovery HD Theater; and was the first 24/7 basic cable HD network in the US. The channel was rebranded to HD Theater on September 22, 2007. Programming included shows from Discovery sister networks, such as American Chopper and Animal Planet's Corwin's Quest, in addition to original programming such as Sunrise Earth (which featured footage of outdoor scenes with no narration), and history-focused titles such as When Dinosaurs Roamed America and Before We Ruled the Earth.

=== As Velocity ===
By 2011, as high definition feeds of mainstream networks had become more common, HD Theater no longer filled a unique niche. On April 14, 2011, Discovery Communications announced that HD Theater would be re-launched as Velocity later in the year. The re-launch, conducted by Robert Scanlon, Dan Russell, Shaan Akbar, Douglas Lerner, Nicole Tong, David Lee and Kelly Mahoney, took place on October 4, 2011. The network targeted an "upscale male" audience, and focused primarily on automotive-oriented programming.

=== As Motor Trend ===
On August 3, 2017, Discovery announced that it would contribute Velocity into a joint venture with the digital, live events, and direct-to-consumer businesses of automotive publisher TEN: The Enthusiast Network. Discovery will hold a majority stake in the venture.

In April 2018, it was announced that TEN had been renamed the Motor Trend Group, and that Velocity would rebrand to Motor Trend Network later in 2018. Co-branded with the automotive magazine Motor Trend, the rebranding was part of an effort by Discovery, following its acquisition of Scripps Networks Interactive, to focus more on direct-to-consumer offerings targeting niche topics with "passionate" audiences. Motor Trend already operates the subscription video-on-demand service Motor Trend OnDemand, and had plotted out international expansion (including a British launch of Motor Trend OnDemand in the UK in December 2017, and a forthcoming over-the-air Motor Trend television channel in Italy.

Velocity officially rebranded as Motor Trend on November 23, 2018.

=== As Discovery Turbo ===
In December 2024, Hearst Communications acquired Motor Trend Group and most its assets from Warner Bros. Discovery, but the TV network was retained by the latter. This eventually led to the TV channel rebranding as Discovery Turbo, a change which took effect on January 9, 2026.

== International versions ==
In Canada, Discovery Velocity launched on February 12, 2015. The channel was, originally, the Canadian version of Discovery HD Theater, and had been branded as Discovery World immediately prior.

In some markets, Discovery operates similarly-themed channels of the same name (Asia-Pacific, Latin America, UK/Ireland, Italy), DTX (Europe, except UK/Ireland and Italy), which feature a similar focus on automotive-themed programs.

== Programming ==
=== As Discovery HD Theater ===
- Before We Ruled the Earth (2003)
- Dinosaur Planet (2003)
- Insectia (1999-2001)
- Sunrise Earth (2004-2008)
- When Dinosaurs Roamed America (2001)

=== As Velocity/Motor Trend/Discovery Turbo ===
==== Event coverage ====
In 2015, Discovery acquired the broadcast rights to Barrett-Jackson's automobile auctions, previously held by Fox Sports. Chris Jacobs and Ray Evernham of AmeriCARna hosted the Barrett-Jackson Live broadcasts on Discovery and Velocity, joined by Rick DeBruhl, Mike Joy, and Steve Magnante. The rights moved to A&E Networks in 2020; in October 2021, Motor Trend Group subsequently reached an agreement with Mecum Auctions beginning in 2022, succeeding its agreement with the soon-to-be-defunct NBCSN.

In April 2018, it was announced that Discovery and Motor Trend Group had acquired the North American broadcast rights to the FIA World Endurance Championship, beginning with the 2018-19 "super season", also replacing Fox Sports. The first and last hours of most events are televised by Motor Trend (with the entire events streaming on Motor Trend digital platforms), and there is live flag-to-flag television coverage of the 1000 Miles of Sebring and 24 Hours of Le Mans. The broadcasts are produced by Eurosport, Discovery's pan-European sports network.

==== Original ====
- All Girls Garage
- American Icon: Muscle Car
- Ant Anstead Master Mechanic
- The Auto Firm with Alex Vega
- Auto/Biography
- Barrett-Jackson Live
- Biggest And Baddest
- Bitchin' Boot Camp
- Bitchin' Rides
- Cafe Racer
- Car Fix
- Chasing Classic Cars
- Dallas Car Sharks
- Drift This
- Engine Masters
- FantomWorks
- Faster with Newbern and Cotten
- Fastest Cars in the Dirty South
- Inside West Coast Customs
- Iron Resurrection starring Joe and Amanda Martin
- Garage Squad
- Junkyard Empire
- Kings of Crash
- Life Size
- Mike Brewer's World of Cars
- Miracle Ball
- Motorhead Garage TV
- MotorTrend: Working from Home
- NASCAR 2020: Under Pressure
- NASCAR All In: Battle for Daytona
- One of a Kind
- Patrick Dempsey: Racing Le Mans
- Pikes Peak: On the Edge
- Restoration Garage
- RMD Garage
- Roadkill
- Roadkill Garage
- Saw Dogs
- South Beach Classics
- Speed Is The New Black
- Super Turbo Story Time
- Tech Toys 360
- Texas Metal
- Top Gear America (Reboot)
- Turn n' Burn
- Unique Rides
- What's In The Barn?
- What's My Car Worth?
- Wheels That Fail

==== Acquired ====
- All Star Dealers
- American Hot Rod
- Car Crazy
- Desert Car Kings
- Destroyed in Seconds
- Eurosport on Velocity
- Fast N' Loud
- Fat and Furious
- Fifth Gear
- Get Out Alive
- Graveyard Carz
- How It's Made: Dream Cars
- HowStuffWorks
- I Could Do That!
- Kidnap & Rescue
- Misfit Garage
- MotorWeek
- Nature's Deadliest
- Overhaulin'
- Salvage Hunters: Classic Cars
- Stacey David's GearZ
- Some Assembly Required
- Top Gear (UK)
- The Detonators
- UFOs Over Earth
- Verminators
- Weird or What?
- Wheeler Dealers
- Wheeler Dealers: Trading Up
- World's Most Expensive Rides
