= Valley of the T. rex =

- Genre: Documentary
- Narrated by: Jimmie Wood

Production
- Running time: 50 minutes

Original release
- Network: Discovery Channel
- Release: September 10, 2001

Related
- When Dinosaurs Roamed America

Valley of the T. rex is a Discovery Channel documentary, featuring paleontologist Jack Horner, that aired on September 10, 2001. The program shows Horner with his digging team as they travel to Hell Creek Formation in search for dinosaur fossils, while also following Horner as he presents his view of the theropod dinosaur Tyrannosaurus rex as a scavenger rather than a predator, as it is often portrayed in popular culture.

== Plot ==
The program shows Horner and his digging team as they travel to the Hell Creek Formation in Montana, United States, and dig up dinosaurs.

The program also follows Horner as he presents arguments for his case of Tyrannosaurus as a scavenger. Horner argues that there is not the slightest evidence that Tyrannosaurus hunted its own prey. Instead, Horner believes the evidence should be clear that Tyrannosaurus was a scavenger, lamenting that "no one likes that idea". Some of Horner's arguments for a scavenger-only Tyrannosaurus are:

- Forelimbs: Tyrannosaurus‘s short forelimbs seem like they could not hold on to struggling prey. Horner argues that predators have well-developed forelimbs with claws to hold prey down while the jaws do the killing, while Tyrannosaurus could not use its forelimbs for much more than to "scratch its belly". Horner believes the upper arm of Tyrannosaurus would have been embedded in muscle, and not externally visible in life. If Tyrannosaurus stumbled and fell while trying to run, the small forelimbs would not be enough to break the fall, and it would get fatal injures.
- Speed: Horner argues that Tyrannosaurus must have been too slow to chase down prey, and also points out that some specimens of Tyrannosaurus have longer thighbones than shinbones. According to Horner, this is not the case in fast-running animals like Saurornitholestes, which have longer shinbones than thighbones. Horner describes Tyrannosaurus as "either a really slow runner, or just a walker."
- Brain and senses: Horner suggests that Tyrannosaurus had a poorly developed sense of sight, and would not be a good predator. Its huge olfactory bulb indicates "a tremendous sense of smell", used to find carcasses.
- Jaws and teeth: Tyrannosaurus had powerful jaws and robust teeth. Horner argues that Tyrannosaurus used them for crushing bones, as modern scavengers like hyenas do to feed on marrow when the flesh of carcass has rotted away. Predators teeth are normally thin and sharp for slicing flesh.

Tyrannosaurus becomes depicted as Horner imagines it: a big, slow-moving animal, traveling across the landscape in search of a carcass. Horner thinks Tyrannosaurus would have a repulsive look: A dark body, a red head, and it would give off a terrible smell. This would help it frighten away other meateaters, like dromaeosaurs, from carcasses. His description of T. rex is "big, nasty, and stinky."

== About the program ==
- When Horner examines the anatomy of Tyrannosaurus in the program, he mostly use the specimen MOR 555 ("Wankel Rex") as reference. This specimen was found by Kathy Wankel in 1988, and was the first specimen of the genus with a well-preserved forelimb.
- The program features Horner and his team as they dig up 5 new Tyrannosaurus specimens.
- The computer animation in the program was made by Meteor Studios. Some of the animations are taken from one of Discovery Channel's other programs about dinosaurs, When Dinosaurs Roamed America.

== Criticism ==
Since Valley of the T. rex was shown on television, it has been met by criticism. Many of the arguments Horner uses to support his case have been examined by other paleontologists, who do not agree that they conclusively show that Tyrannosaurus was an obligate scavenger. As for Tyrannosaurus‘s short forelimbs, it has been pointed out that predators like wolves and hyenas do not use their front legs to take down prey. Moreover, hyenas, like Tyrannosaurus, have jaws and teeth to crush bone, yet they use it to hunt their own prey.

In the program, Horner measures the leg bones of MOR 1128, or "G-rex", one of the skeletons which were shown in the program as it was dug up. The narrator says that "G-rex" was found in a rock layer 90 meters below where "Wankelrex" was found, and Horner says "G-rex" are thought to be 3 million years older than other known specimens (like "Wankelrex"). Horner also says that "G-rex" have thighbone and shinbone of equal length, while "Wankelrex", have longer thighbone than shinbone. Horner argues it is an indication that Tyrannosaurus over time lost the ability to run and evolved to more specialization as a walking scavenger. It has been argued by Garner, however, that the shinbone of "Wankelrex" are restored from broken fragments, making it inappropriate as reference in comparative morphology. Also, according to other reports, "G-rex" also had longer thighbone (1.26 meters) than shinbone (1.12 meters). Holtz also points out that longer thighbones than shinbones is a condition also found in horses, which are fast running animals. A shorter shinbone might be compensated by a relatively long metatarsus, which is seen both in horses and tyrannosaurids.

Other scientists have argued that Tyrannosaurus could have had a well-developed sense of sight with binocular vision, typical of a predator, and a well-developed sense of smell in Tyrannosaurus could have been used for hunting, rather than just finding carcasses. Evidences for a predatory lifestyle in Tyrannosaurus includes discoveries of skeletons from herbivorous dinosaurs like Edmontosaurus and Triceratops, with evidence of healed bitemarks on them, indicating they survived attacks from big predators, possibly Tyrannosaurus.
