= AMS Pictures =

American creative media company

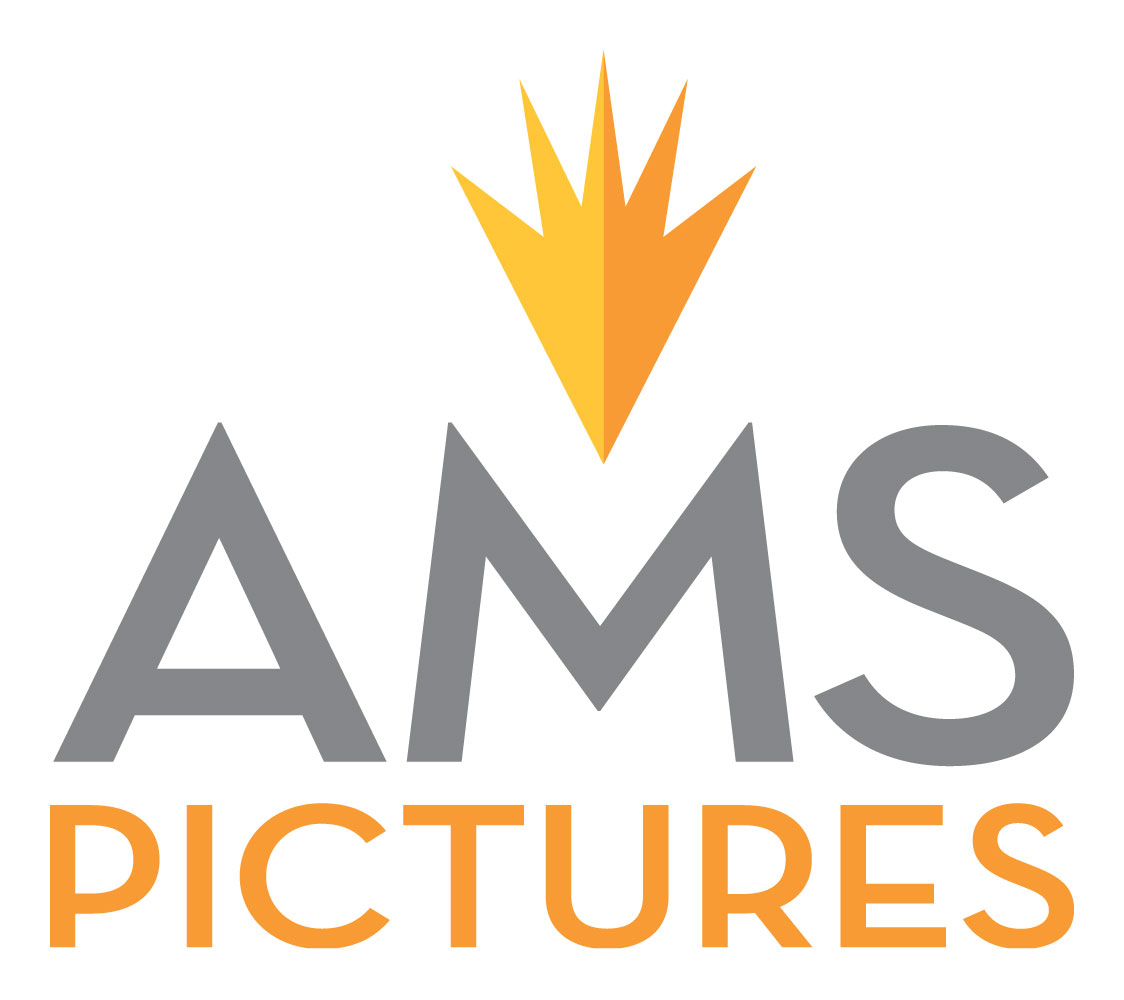
- Company type: Private
- Industry: Video Production services, television production company, integrated media company
- Founded: Incorporated September 16, 1982
- Founder: Andy Streitfeld
- Headquarters: Dallas, Texas, United States
- Key people: former: Mark McGovern, Vice President Creative Services; Stacy Thiele, Vice President Operations
- Products: Documentaries, Commercials, PSAs
- Number of employees: 75
- Website: amspictures.com

AMS Pictures, founded in 1982, is the largest creative media company in the American south headquartered in Dallas, Texas. In 1996, AMS finished construction on their 40,000 sq ft (3,700 m^{2}). production studio in Dallas, and in 2000, they opened a branch office in Austin, Texas.

The company has since started focusing heavily on the creation of original programming including several award-winning feature-length documentaries. In 2009, the company formally changed its name from AMS Production Group to AMS Pictures.

== History ==
AMS Production Group was formally started in 1982, with $25,000 in loans from the founder Andy Streitfeld's friends and relatives. Throughout the 1980s and early 1990s, the company grew in size and eventually moved out of Streitfeld's back bedroom and into rented warehouse space at KDFI-TV (Channel 27) in Irving, Texas. Two years later, the company moved into its own office building inside the Las Colinas Communications Complex, beginning its reputation as a full-fledged production company and signing clients such as Radio Shack and JC Penney.

In 1995, AMS broke ground on its new corporate headquarters and in the same year won the bid to handle all of the promotional and media elements of the Ross Perot's 1996 Presidential Campaign. In 2000, the company created its first satellite office in Austin, Texas to cater to public sector markets around the state capital. Ten years after the Ross Perot Campaign, AMS was hired by the Kinky Friedman 2006 Texas Gubernatorial campaign to produce the independent candidates Television spots. In early 2009, the company officially rebranded itself as AMS Pictures to further distinguish its original programming focus.

== Facilities ==
The company's flagship corporate headquarters is currently located on the North Dallas Parkway in Dallas, Texas. Construction began on the facility in 1995, with the 40,000-square-foot (3,700 m^{2}) studio "themepark" completed in 1998 for 4.6 million dollars. The facility includes many Disney inspired elements throughout, stemming from the founder's love of all things Disney.

Walt Disney used to go to amusement parks, and they were not very well-run. There were guys with no teeth that ran the rides, and mud all over the place. So he built Disneyland. And this is kind of my homage to him.” - Andy Streitfeld

The studio includes several soundstages as well as a “Main Street;” a TV diner; Santa Fe, Paris, and New York themed editing rooms among others; “Jodi’s Barber Shop” (the makeup room); and Egyptian-themed restrooms where Cleopatra silently plays on wide-screen television sets.

In 2000, AMS broke ground on its first branch office studio in Austin, Texas. The 5,000-square-foot (460 m^{2}) facility offers a large soundstage, a fiber connected satellite booth, final cut pro editing suites, and meeting rooms all themed to Disney much like its Dallas counterpart.

== Productions ==
The company shoots a variety of marketing and web based media materials for companies like Frito-Lay, Home Depot, and the Dallas-based Texas Instruments, with 70% of its business attributed to fortune 500 companies in 2000. The Children's TV series Jay Jay the Jet Plane was filmed here from 1994 to 1995. Mark McGovern directed the show from its original run on December 13, 1994 until October 3, 1995. After the model series was cancelled, it was announced that the models would be replaced with computer animation. AMS has also worked with many broadcasters televising national sports spots using their in house satellite booths. Since 2005, AMS has produced over 200 hours of original programming including several feature-length documentaries. In 2007, AMS created the documentary Bodacious Boots featuring the history and cultural impact of the cowboy boot especially within the context of Texas History. The documentary featured several notable celebrities with roots in Texas, including Lyle Lovett, Kinky Friedman, and Sydney Pollack. In 2008, AMS produced The Real Great Debaters of Wiley College, which played film festivals around the United States.

== Filmography ==
- Harvester (Filmed 1994, Released 1996)
- Jay Jay the Jet Plane (1994–1995)
- The Power of Harmony (2005)
- Race Car Driver (2005–2007)
- Rising from the Rails: The Story of the Pullman Porter (2006)
- Champ Car Season Preview (2006) (TV)
- Yoga for Life (2007) (Veria Living TV)
- Woman Driver (2007)
- The Art of Living Gallery (2007–2008) (Veria Living TV)
- Shock (2007)
- Portrait of Abuse (2007)
- Pilates from the Inside Out (2007) (Veria Living TV)
- In the Shadow of Hollywood: Race Movies and the Birth of Black Cinema (2007)
- Flying for Freedom: Untold Stories of the Tuskegee Airmen (2007)
- Bodacious Boots (2007)
- The Real Great Debaters of Wiley College (2008)
- Natural Companions (2008–2012) (Veria Living TV)
- A Colored Life: The Herb Jeffries Story (2008)
- The Good Fight: The James Farmer Story (2009)
- Stop the Presses: The American Newspaper in Peril (2009)
- Resurrecting Moton Field: The Birthplace of the Tuskegee Airmen (2009)
- Girl Meets Gown (2009) (WE tv)
- Paul Mooney: It's the End of the World! (2010) (Showtime)
- I Am Alive: Nando Parrado's Story (2010)
- Verizon-Road to the Finals (2011) (GMC TV)
- Ma's Roadhouse (2011) (TruTV)
- Home Strange Home (2011–2013) (HGTV)
- Food Attack (2011) (Food Network)
- Flightmares (2011) (Bio.)
- A Defining Moment (2011)
- Killer Teens (2012) (Bio.)
- Chuck's Eat the Street (2012–2013) (Cooking Channel)
- You Live in What? (2013) (HGTV)
- True Tales (2013)
- Cool Pools (2013) (HGTV)
- Car Sharks (2013) (Velocity)
- Amazing Water Homes (2013) (HGTV)
- Karen Carpenter: Starving for Perfection (2023)
