= Graveyard Carz =

American automotive reality TV series

- Created by: Mark Worman, Aaron Smith, Casey Faris
- Directed by: Peter Hermansader (2020-present) D.L. Watson, Casey Faris (2011–2013)
- Starring: Mark Worman, Allysa Rose, Royal Yoakum, Will Scott, Doug Oldham (2011-present), Dave Rea, Josh Rose (2011-2014), Daren Kirkpatrick (2011-2014), Holley Chedester (2012-2013), George McGeorge (2015-present)
- Narrated by: Aaron Smith (2015-present), Jon Bailey (2014–2015)
- Theme music composer: Thomas Lesh (Main Music), Richard Cranach (2011–2014)
- Opening theme: OctoSound "Intense Rock Trailer", Echovolt (2011–2014)
- Country of origin: United States
- Original language: English
- No. of seasons: 14
- No. of episodes: 175

Production
- Executive producers: Mark Worman, Aaron Smith, Jeffery Osborns, Peter Hermansader (2020-present), D.L. Watson, Sam Chambliss, Casey Faris (2011-2015)
- Producers: Mark Worman, Aaron Smith, Jeffery Osborns, Peter Hermansader (2020-present), D.L. Watson, Matthew Pryor, Dan Bernard (2011-2015)
- Cinematography: Michael Sherman
- Editors: Shane Boss, Nick DeAngelo, Jeffery Osborns, Isabelle Rogers (2020-present), Aaron Smith (2011-present), Sam Chambliss, Michael Maruska, Christopher White, D.L. Watson, Casey Faris, Dan Bernard (2011-2015), Gavin P. Cunningham (2013-2016), Nicole Compton (2013)
- Running time: 60 minutes
- Production companies: The Division Productions, LLC

Original release
- Network: Motortrend formerly Velocity
- Release: June 14, 2012 – present

Graveyard Carz is an American automotive reality TV show made on location in Springfield, Oregon that restores the late 1960s/early 1970s Mopar muscle cars. Their shop motto is "It's Mopar or No Car". As of July 28, 2020, the show is in production for a 15th season on Motortrend, formerly Velocity.

== The show ==
Graveyard Carz was created and is owned by Mark Worman. It is produced independently by The Division, a film and television production company in which Worman is also the CEO. The show's relationship with Velocity is called "a pre-sale acquisition." The Division retains all creative control but frequently takes notes and suggestions from the Velocity team.

In 2016 TERN commissioned and acquired the global rights for 26 episodes of Graveyard Carz in HFR UHD. These episodes will be aired on Velocity in HD as Season 6 and elsewhere by Insight as Season 6 and Season 7.

=== The 1971 Phantom 'Cuda ===
Mark Worman wanted to document the restoration of a 1971 Plymouth 'Cuda, painted Hemi Orange, equipped with a 440 6 Barrel V8, a Heavy Duty 4-Speed manual transmission, and a 3.54 ratio Dana 60 rear axle. On July 5, 1980, the car was wrecked after the driver lost control in a 100 mph race with a pickup truck. After acquiring the car, Worman agreed with a collector to have the car restored.

To prove to nay-sayers that the car could be restored, Mark had the son of local friend (Aaron Smith) film the restoration. After seeing how entertaining the team was, Worman and Smith decided to start shooting concept material for a television pilot, and Graveyard Carz was born.

Over the course of the first five seasons, viewers have seen The Phantom 'Cuda undergo a slow transformation. In Season 1 it was dipped in a paint stripping tank, while its overall condition was assessed in Season 2. Season 3 saw the repair of a fender to determine if the sheet metal was too compromised to use in the restoration. At the end of Season 4, the 'Cuda was shipped off to Auto Metal Direct (AMD), an automobile and truck replacement parts retailer for installation. The car returned in Season 5 with all brand new sheet metal. In Season 6 The Phantom 'Cuda is completed, restored to factory condition.

=== Cast (The Ghouls) ===
The first four seasons of Graveyard Carz featured Mark Worman, Royal Yoakum, Josh Rose, and Daren Kirkpatrick. Seasons 2 and 3 featured recurring cast member Holly Chedester, who did not return for Season 4.

Season 5 (previously titled Season 4b) brought back Mark Worman's daughter Allysa Rose, a recurring cast member in Season 1 (and married to fellow cast member Josh Rose), Worman's best friend Royal Yoakum, and introduced Will Scott, a vehicle painter (who had been part of the original concept for the series) as well as new mechanic/assembly technician and long-time fan of the show David Rea.

== Production ==
Currently, a 13-episode season takes about 100 days of continuous shooting. Earlier seasons took more than a year, as the original crew would only work Saturdays on Mopar builds. True to the show's premise, the current cast is actual automotive technicians, and the film crew plans series shoots around the elements of key car builds.

Once a car is completed, if its owners are willing, a shoot is planned to see the car "revealed" to them. The film crew takes extra care to make the "reveal" as true to life as possible.

Due to how quickly the show must be produced, and how long it actually takes to build a car, the episodes are edited parallel with the filming. Therefore, each episode doesn't have a typical car show reveal, but instead, emphasis is placed on the smaller yet significant sub-assembly builds needed on a car.

Comedic storylines are often shot separately, away from the actual car work being done. Therefore, every effort is made to place them in episodes as close to when they occurred in real time in order to avoid continuity issues. Despite popular belief, most comedic storylines are claimed to be 100% true, depicting events that have happened in the shop. The cast is encouraged to let the film crew in on any pranks to best capture real reactions.

=== Season 6 Revamp ===
Graveyard Carz went through a total revamp: new logo, new graphics, and new show format built upon the changes made in Season 5. Rather than focusing on the cast and their daily activities, focus has shifted to the cars and their builds in order to draw in viewers disheartened by the original format of the show.

== Episodes ==
=== Season 1 (2012) ===
No.	Title	Original release date
1	"Emma's Car"	June 14, 2012
A crew of automotive mechanics (the ghouls) are tasked with a challenging assignment in the opener of this series, which follows the restoration of Mopar muscle cars that have been wrecked or forgotten for years. Mark plans on buying a car to restore and give to his granddaughter when she grows up.
2	"It's the Great Pumpkin, Mark Worman!"	June 21, 2012
A costly mishap dampens the guys' excitement over an upcoming pumpkin-carving contest.
3	"Daren Goes Plum Crazy"	June 28, 2012
Daren is given control of the shop for a week.
4	"Runnin' Down a Dream"	July 5, 2012
The guys rush to complete work on a 1970 Road Runner after receiving an angry call from the car's owner. Josh encourages the guys to make New Year's resolutions.
5	"More than a Wrench"	July 12, 2012
The guys accuse Mark of not working as hard as they do; Josh and Daren visit the crash site of the shop's 1971 Phantom 'Cuda.
6	"The Big Dipper"	July 19, 2012
Mark stresses over a delicate project involving the shop's 1971 Phantom 'Cuda.

=== Season 2 (2013) ===
No. overall	No. in season	Title	Original release date
7	1	"It's Alive"	January 8, 2013
Mark examines differences between older and newer models of the Dodge Challenger in the second-season premiere
8	2	"Six Pack to Go"	January 15, 2013
Mark and his crew fall behind on the '71 Charger project.
9	3	"Hey, Charger"	January 22, 2013
The '71 Charger is taken for a test-drive.
10	4	"Wet Paint"	January 29, 2013
The Challenger receives a coat of paint. Josh stumbles upon a surprise.
11	5	"Factory Correct"	February 5, 2013
The guys add new equipment to the shop.
12	6	"Holley Equipped"	February 18, 2013
Mark becomes concerned about the lack of research being done during restorations, so hires an assistant to do the research. The 1969 Daytona Charger is sent out for media blasting, and the 1970 AAR 'Cuda is documented and disassembled. The new research assistant, Holley, finds the 2nd owner of the 1971 Phantom 'Cuda.
13	7	"Every Rose Has Its Thorn"	February 19, 2013
Josh takes a part-time job, which upsets Mark. Work continues on the Phantasm 'Cuda.
14	8	"You Win Some …"	February 26, 2013
The AAR 'Cuda is sent to and returns from the sandblaster. The 383 'Cuda is prepared to be wet-sanded, but a mistake in the 1/4 panel shaping forces a postponement. Mark installs a security camera system. Progress stalls on the Sunroof Challenger due to parts availability.
15	9	"Cuda Madness"	March 5, 2013
The guys repair the Barracuda's fender.
16	10	"Flippin' the Bird"	March 12, 2013
A surprise birthday party is planned for Mark, and the 1970 Superbird is checked for matching numbers. The Superbird's owners visit the shop and tell the story about how they found the car.
17	11	"Fish ‘n' Chips"	March 19, 2013
Daren is left in charge of the shop and work continues of the 1971 Phantasm 'Cuda, though a mistake by the crew delays its completion. The 383 'Cuda assembly begins, and the nose cone and rear spoiler is installed on the 1969 Daytona Charger.
18	12	"Game Day"	March 26, 2013
Daren threatens to quit, then invites Royal and Josh to a cookout, leaving Mark by himself to work on the Phantasm 'Cuda. A phone call from the car's irate owner leaves Mark with an ultimatum: finish the car in one week. Mark rallies the troops and outlines what has to be done to finish the car by that deadline.
19	13	"Phantasm ‘Cuda"	April 2, 2013
Daren returns to the team as work on the black Phantasm 'Cuda continues. Mark validates the authenticity of a 1969 1/2 A12 Super Bee. Mark gets a surprise phone call from Phantasm Writer/Producer/Director Don Coscarelli.

=== Season 3 (2014) ===
Starting with the second episode, the series now includes trivia questions before and after the commercial breaks and recaps of what has taken place up to that point. A new opening title sequence also debuted on the second episode of the season.

No. overall	No. in season	Title	Original release date
20	1	"Back in Triple Black"	January 7, 2014
The 1971 Phantasm Tribute 'Cuda is completed, and Phantasm Writer-Producer-Director Don Coscarelli and star Michael Baldwin visit the shop to view and drive the completed restoration.
21	2	"AAR You Ready for This"	January 14, 2014
A 1970 Superbird and a 1970 Barracuda are featured. Daren confronts Mark about stolen car parts.
22	3	"Go for It!"	January 21, 2014
Mark gets a surprise, and the 1969 Daytona Charger's owner visits and helps with work on his car. Progress is made on the 1970 Sunroof Challenger.
23	4	"Get Your Hands Dirty"	January 28, 2014
Mark installs a hood decal on the 1970 Challenger, and Holley helps Josh disassemble the Barracuda's suspension.
24	5	"W-O-M-A-N, Mark Woman"	February 4, 2014
The team rush to complete work on a 1969 Dodge Daytona, and a leadership dispute is settled.
25	6	"Pop Secrets"	February 11, 2014
Daren reveals a secret. Holley works on the 1970 Challenger with Mark, and a rare car is damaged.
26	7	"Showtime"	February 18, 2014
The 1970 Charger is disassembled, and Mark reveals a secret project.
27	8	"The Royal Treatment"	February 25, 2014
An engine is built for the 1970 Plymouth Superbird. The 1969 Daytona Charger gets a new suspension, and Josh agrees to let Daren store his Challenger in Josh's garage.
28	9	"The Grand Torino"	March 4, 2014
A 1967 Plymouth GTX convertible is disassembled.
29	10	"The Waltons"	March 11, 2014
Daren gets an incredible offer for his 1970 Challenger R/T, and the story of the 1972 Charger is told.
30	11	"It's the Great Pumpkin, Goldberg!"	March 18, 2014
Bill Goldberg drops off his 1968 GTX convertible for Mark and the crew to restore.
31	12	"Daytona Reborn Pt. 1"	March 25, 2014
Part 1 of 2. The crew rush to complete work on a 1969 Daytona Charger.
32	13	"Daytona Reborn Pt. 2"	April 1, 2014
Conclusion. The crew completes work on the 1969 Daytona Charger.

=== Special (2014) ===
No. overall	Title	Original release date
33	"The Elephant in the Room"	July 31, 2014
A 1970 Dodge Charger engine is restored in this special episode.

=== Season 4 (2014–15) ===
No. overall	No. in season	Title	Original release date
34	1	"Daren and Royal Go Topless"	November 18, 2014
A rare 1970 Charger and a 1970 Barracuda 383 are featured.
35	2	"General Disassemble Lee"	November 25, 2014
A 1968 Charger, a 1970 Challenger R/T, and a 1969 Charger are featured.
36	3	"Mo Money Mo Challengers"	December 2, 2014
A 1972 Dodge Charger is restored.
37	4	"Drive a Mile in My Shoes"	December 9, 2014
A 1969 Road Runner is featured.
38	5	"Top Banana Charge"	December 23, 2014
Work on a 1972 Dodge Charger is continued.
39	6	"Gone Bananas"	December 23, 2014
The story about the 1972 Charger is briefly revisited, and past work leading to its completion is also revisited. Work on the 1972 Dodge Charger is completed and revealed to the owners.
40	7	"Manifold Destiny"	December 23, 2014
The 1970 Plymouth Superbird work is resumed, and the 1970 Charger R/T collision repair is completed. The 1970 Barracuda Convertible's 383 2bbl. V8 is assembled and painted.
41	8	"Spoiler Alert"	December 30, 2014
A secret is accidentally revealed by Mark. Mark and Daren visit the local AAMCO Transmissions to watch the overhaul of the 1970 Barracuda Convertible's 727 Automatic Transmission, and then the Barracuda has its A/C box and instrument panel installed. The 1970 Superbird assembly nears completion.
42	9	"MoSparring"	January 6, 2015
Automotive parts supplier Tony D'Agostino of Tony's Parts helps the shop get organized, and Mark tests his Mopar knowledge against Tony's. Work on a 1970 Plymouth Superbird is completed.
43	10	"The Hills Have Eyes on a Superbird"	January 20, 2015
The 1970 Superbird's restoration and story is recapped, and the Hills visit the shop to take delivery of the car, along with its original owner. Mike and Michael Hill drive the Superbird on a cross county trip home to South Carolina.
44	11	"Clipped Wings"	January 27, 2015
With the 1970 Plymouth Superbird done and safely driven home, Mark is asked to restore a 1969 Daytona Charger. Due to its condition, Mark questions if it's practical and if it's even legal.
45	12	"Put Me In, Coach"	February 3, 2015
Just when things couldn't get more stressful, Mark agrees to finally get the 1930 Chevy Coach fully restored by the end of the week. Meanwhile, Mark QC's the next cars in the process of resurrection.
46	13	"How to Cook a Barracuda"	August 6, 2015
See the complete 3-year restoration of Kimberly Cook's 1970 Barracuda Convertible: the body, paint, engine, and convertible top, culminating in Graveyard Carz' most emotional reveal to date.

=== Season 5 (2015–16) ===
Season five features a new cast and new shop.

No. overall	No. in season	Title	Original release date
47	1	"Commando Cuda vs. Magnum Force"	October 7, 2015
New shop. New crew. An All-new Graveyard Carz! The ghouls tackle a 1970 Cuda.
48	2	"Rallye Red Restored"	October 14, 2015
Mark paints a Hemi Charger in his favorite Mopar color, burnt orange. AMD delivers the Phantom Cuda, and the ghouls finish the Dailey's 1970 Cuda 383, a project four years in the making.
49	3	"Hell Hath No '58 Fury"	October 21, 2015
The ghouls wrap up the 340 Cuda and install panels on the Hemi Charger. Mark trains Allysa on O.E.M. assembly line markings. The legendary red Plymouth Fury "Christine" visits the shop.
50	4	"400 Magnum Misfire"	October 28, 2015
The ghouls have problems with after-market parts for the 400 Magnum V8. Allysa begins working in the shop, and two rare Mopars are disassembled.
51	5	"Return of the '70 Sunroof Challenger"	November 25, 2015
Mark's coffee addiction is spotlighted, and the ghouls work on a 1970 Challenger.
52	6	"'70 Cuda Grace"	December 2, 2015
Work on a 1970 Cuda 340 is featured.
53	7	"Hemi Orange is the New Corporate Blue"	December 9, 2015
The ghouls work on a 1968 GTX for Bill Goldberg, and Mark repairs a Challenger deck lid. Will paints a 1967 Hemi GTX and challenges Mark to a paint-off.
54	8	"Grand Theft Hemi"	December 16, 2015
Mark teaches Allysa to analyze and document cars in preparation for disassembly, but she later has a crucial lapse in judgement. The ghouls install the 400 Magnum in the 1972 Dodge Charger.
55	9	"Investigation O.E."	December 23, 2015
Two rare Mopars, a Daytona survivor and early Hemi Charger, are analyzed for authenticity and restoration.
56	10	"Chally vs. Chally"	December 30, 2015
The ghouls complete the 1970 V-Code Challenger and make a side-by-side comparison with Mark's 2014 Shaker-hood Challenger.
57	11	"HEMI FK5 Alive"	January 6, 2016
A 1970 Hemi Charger is restored.
58	12	"Pitch and Rides"	January 13, 2016
The 1970 Hemi Charger project is completed in the season finale.

=== Season 6 (2016–17) ===
No. overall	No. in season	Title	Original release date
59	1	"Elephant in a '69"	November 9, 2016
Mopar Morticians work on the ultra rare 1969 Hemi Road Runner Convertible painted in Seafoam Turquoise - the goal: to get its massive 426 engine installed.
60	2	"From Road Runner to Superbird"	November 9, 2016
A '70 Plymouth Road Runner is converted into a Superbird.
61	3	"Roaming the Restorations"	November 16, 2016
Decals are installed on Bill Goldberg's 1968 GTX Convertible; Allysa helps Will block and prep the Phantom Cuda.
62	4	"Taming a 1971 Challenger"	November 23, 2016
An engine assessment is performed on a 1971 Challenger.
63	5	"Privilege to Drive a '68 GTX Convertible"	November 30, 2016
Mark and Royal pick up a Dodge Power Wagon; and Dave and Allysa build out a center console for a 1967 Hemi GTX Convertible.
64	6	"Mark Unwrapped"	December 7, 2016
Mark micromanages Will, who's trying to prep the 1970 Cuda. Later, a convertible top is installed on a 1967 Hemi GTX.
65	7	"Dude, Where's Alyssa's Car"	December 14, 2016
The guys work on Bill Goldberg's 1968 Plymouth GTX convertible.
66	8	"A Fly in the Ointment"	December 21, 2016
Will begins working on the Phantom 'Cuda, but Allysa's constant interruptions lead him to haze her. Later, Dave gets started on his 1970 Dodge Swinger's 340 engine.
67	9	"Will Gets Grumpy"	December 28, 2016
Allysa and Mark apply decals to the Hemi Roadrunner convertible; Will paints the jams on the Superbird tribute car, then gets a Care Bears tattoo, "Grumpy Bear". A family's 1970 Dodge Challenger R/T is evaluated by Alyssa and Mark for restoration.
68	10	"Phantom's 440 Six Barrel"	January 4, 2017
The motor of the 1971 Cuda is ready to be installed. Later, Mark teaches Adam how to build the front suspension and assembles the rear axle.
69	11	"Cap'ing-off the Challenger"	January 11, 2017
Will preps the Green Go Challenger for its last paint job; and Allysa and Mark assess a newly-arrived 1968 Dodge Charger. Later, Will interferes after being fed up with Mark's antics in the paint booth.
70	12	"67 Hemi GTX Convertible Resurrected"	January 25, 2017
After commissioning the team to repair botched-restoration work, Mopar collector Brett Torino's 1967 Hemi GTX Convertible is nearly ready for its grand reveal.
71	13	"'72 Charger SE Resurrected"	February 1, 2017
Dave and Allysa tackle the interior of a custom '72 Charger SE, as the owner plans on taking it for its first test drive.

=== Season 7 (2017) ===
No. overall	No. in season	Title	Original release date
72	1	"Grin and Bear a 'Cuda"	March 20, 2017
The ghouls get cracking on the infamous 71 Phantom Cuda; installing the exhaust, the door windows, tail lights, rear valance, body plugs, and the piece de resistance: the 1971 Cuda gills.
73	2	"General Lee Considered"	March 27, 2017
Will and Dave team up to get the 1971 Phantom Cuda's grill painted and built out. Allysa gets trained on the wildly entertaining Stringo. Mark and Will get historical in their pursuit of the perfect paint for the famous 1969 Charger General Lee.
74	3	"Operation Firepower"	April 3, 2017
Mark and Royal go off-road and down memory lane when they fire up their friend's old Dodge truck. Mark announces a top secret project to the ghouls, and Allysa surprises her dad for Father's Day
75	4	"The Roadrunner Gives Me a Hemi"	April 10, 2017
Meep-Meep! The 1 of 1 ever built, 1969 Hemi Roadrunner Convertible, is back on the lift. With the owner soon to arrive, the ghouls have to ramp up and get it finished.
76	5	"Judgment Day"	April 17, 2017
Tony's in town! Tony and Cindy D'Agostino visit the Ghouls in the Graveyard. Mark and Tony geek out over several cemetery selects: the 1970 Superbee 383 Magnum, the 1971 Plymouth Roadrunner, and the 1970 Challenger R/T 440.
77	6	"Cuda 'Tat"	April 24, 2017
Will must repeat the perfect paint job that he did on the 1970 burnt orange 'Cuda with the very difficult to apply FK5 paint.
78	7	"What We Do for a Buck"	May 1, 2017
Buck's '71 Challenger R/T is restored.
79	8	"Daytona vs. Hellcat"	May 8, 2017
The top secret Firepower Cuda returns from the dipper. Will trains Allysa to be a killing machine. George, Ryan, and Josh assemble the 69 Charger General Lee and begin body work.
80	9	"Firepower Un-Boxed"	May 15, 2017
Operation Firepower is well underway! Josh, Will, and Allysa are making progress with the Firepower Cuda's bodywork. Meanwhile, Dave continues with his work on Buck's 1971 Dodge Challenger R/T.
81	10	"Mopar or No Car"	May 22, 2017
Ron Jenkins from Magnum Force and his buddy Jeff, visit the Graveyard to help out with the Firepower Cuda. Pietro Gorlier, President & CEO of Mopar, makes a surprise visit to the shop, and a package arrives with something magical inside.
82	11	"Firepower Operation"	May 29, 2017
It's nearing the end for Operation Firepower. With SEMA around the corner, the ghouls are working hard to complete this first of its kind project.
83	12	"Disneyland of Carz"	June 5, 2017
With the engine running, the Ghouls continue preparations for SEMA. Finally, when the Firepower 'Cuda is ready for the big reveal in Vegas, Allysa makes her move to get revenge on Will.
84	13	"The Phantom 'Cuda Rides Again"	June 12, 2017
Finally, after 6 and a half seasons, the legendary 1971 440 six-barrel, Phantom Cuda is revealed to its owner. This car was wrecked and abandoned in the early 80's, rusting and rotting until Mark's client purchased it in 2007.

=== Season 8 (2017–18) ===
No. overall	No. in season	Title	Original release date
85	1	"General Assemble Lee"	November 15, 2017
In the Season 8 premiere, the Ghouls return with the final assembly of the legendary General Lee, which so happens to also be the official screen-used, record-holding, freeway jump car from the 2005 "Dukes of Hazzard" film.
86	2	"Put Up Your Dukes"	November 22, 2017
Mark begins the assembly of the 440 4BBL for the 1970 Plum Crazy Challenger, previously owned by a former cast member.
87	3	"General Deliver Lee"	November 29, 2017
It is a delivery day at the Graveyard. The team reviews every moment in the restoration of the notable, screen-used, and record-holding General Lee from the 2005 “Dukes of Hazzard" film.
88	4	"Inner Workings of a Victim"	December 6, 2017
With all the distractions out of the way, Mark returns to the machine-ship to finish the 440 4BBL for the 1970 Plum Crazy Challenger while master-assembler Dave begins working on the 1970 Lemon-Twist Roadrunner.
89	5	"Dueling Drivetrains"	December 13, 2017
With Mark out of the shop looking at a potential new location for a Mopar car dealership, the Graveyard Ghouls begin the drivetrain assembly's for a 1970 Lime Light Tribute Superbird and the 1970 Plum Crazy Challenger.
90	6	"Getting Schooled"	December 20, 2017
Mark and the Ghouls race against the clock to finish some last-minute tasks on their various Mopar restorations before traveling north to judge a car show at Little Creek Casino.
91	7	"Roadrunner With a Twist"	January 27, 2018
Mark and Allysa install the graphics on the '71 Plumb Crazy Challenger; the 1970 Lemon-Twist Roadrunner gets finished and readied for delivery to its owner; Mark proposes what he thinks is a brilliant idea to the show's producers.
92	8	"Engines, Assemblies, and Dougie, Oh My!"	January 3, 2018
With the 1970 Plum Crazy Challenger nearing completion, works shifts to the 1970 Tribute Superbird; Mark and Cousin Dougie build out a 340 engine; Will assists George with metal work to help him stay on schedule.
93	9	"I Love the Smell of Plum Crazy in the Morning"	January 10, 2018
It's a special day at Graveyard Carz. The 1970 Plum Crazy Challenger that has been part of the show since the beginning, is finally finished and ready to be shipped to its new owner. But before they do that, they take it to the coast to show it off.
94	10	"Gone in 60 Days"	January 17, 2018
Work ramps up on our 1970 Tribute Superbird and just when things couldn't get more stressful, Mark has taken on a new project - a 1968 GTX owned by none other than Chris Jacobs, host of Overhaulin'.
95	11	"Mopardy"	January 24, 2018
Stress levels rise in the shop when Mark learns that the owner of Tony’s Mopar Parts will be arriving to check on the progress of his 1970 Dodge Challenger; Mark distracts Tony while the team hustles to begin the vehicle’s restoration.
96	12	"A Buck Shorted"	January 31, 2018
SEMA 2017 is fast approaching and the Graveyard Ghouls are working hard on Chris Jacob's 1969 GTX and John Buck's 1971 Challenger with a Hellcrate Hemi. But as pressure begins to mount, Mark questions if he'll be able to keep his promises.
97	13	"The Phoenix 'Cuda"	February 7, 2018
A look at the Phoenix Cuda which is reborn after being incinerated to ashes.

=== Season 9 (2018) ===
No. overall	No. in season	Title	Original release date
98	1	"SEMA Has Eyes On A Hellbird"	March 7, 2018
Graveyard Carz returns to conclude the epic builds of Chris Jacob's 1968 GTX after it suffered a devastating fire, and a 1970 Plymouth Superbird equipped with a Hellcat Crate Hemi.
99	2	"68 GTX vs Echo Bomber"	March 14, 2018
New Season, New Carz! With SEMA in their rear-view mirror, the ghouls begin the final assembly of a 1969 Plymouth GTX in Seafoam Turquoise. And when help comes up short-handed, Mark enlists what he likes to call his "Echo Bomber."
100	3	"Pilot Takes Flight"	March 21, 2018
It's the 100th Episode! Join Mark and Royal and watch the never-before-aired Pilot featuring some of the first Mopar restorations the original ghouls tackled over ten-years ago.
101	4	"Surveying The Will To Work"	March 28, 2018
It's a hectic day. Dave jumps from car to car, installing and assembling what he can; Will struggles to keep focused on one project at a time; and Mark makes progress on his A100 build with the hopes of revealing at SEMA 2018.
102	5	"What's Next?"	April 4, 2018
Professional wrestler, actor, and former pro football player known for his time in the WWE and WCW as Goldberg returns to the Graveyard! This time, he brings the ghouls two brand new projects - one of which includes installing a brand-new cars.
103	6	"Performance with a Touch of Luxury"	April 11, 2018
The Ghouls say goodbye to the 1970 Superbird equipped with a Hellcat Crate Hemi by taking it out for one last drive. Then it's all hands on deck to get the beautiful second-generation Plymouth GTX finished in time for the big reveal for the owner.
104	7	"Dissecting a Daytona"	April 19, 2018
With a Plymouth GTX finished, the ghouls refocus their efforts on the 1970 Dodge Daytona; Mark and Tony had debated whether they should restore it or not; with the owner wanting a full restoration, the Ghouls begin the tedious disassembly.
105	8	"Exorcize a Demon"	April 25, 2018
The crew begins the restoration on one of the most requested renovations ever: a 1971 Dodge Demon.
106	9	"Frankenstein's Work"	May 2, 2018
It's crunch time at Graveyard Carz; Mark continues to work on his A100 build for SEMA; Will struggles to keep the momentum up in the paint department; Dave continues to assemble an extremely rare and valuable Coronet Convertible.
107	10	"Look to the West for B5 Blue"	May 9, 2018
Dave is ready to wrap up the 1970 Challenger RT/SE but is waiting for parts; Mark's A100 build continues; after a long and tedious bodywork and paint phase, Will is ready to deliver Dave the 1969 B5 Blue Plymouth GTX.
108	11	"A Challenger Reflected"	May 16, 2018
The Ghouls finish the 1970 Challenger RT/SE; as they take it out for its first test drive in more than 15 years, Mark and the team reflect on the trials and challenges throughout the restoration process.
109	12	"Mark, Dougie, Allysa, Oh My!"	May 23, 2018
Things kick into high-gear around the shop; the team begins the restoration of a Challenger T/A; Will paints a '68 GTX in B7 Blue; Allysa learns dash assembly; they install the drivetrain for the ultra-rare 1970 Hemi Convertible Coronet R/T.
110	13	"Shaking the Magic 8-Ball"	May 30, 2018
Mark pulls back the curtain on the next four Mopars in desperate need of resurrection while also showcasing the fans favorite moments from Seasons 8 and 9.

=== Season 10 (2018–19) ===
No. overall	No. in season	Title	Original release date
111	1	"Ripping Up the Dash"	November 30, 2018
Mark and the Ghouls are back, and with a call in from the owner of the super-rare 1 of 2 ever made, 1970 Coronet Hemi Convertible, Mark has to work fast to reach a looming deadline. At the same time, Will primes the body of our 1969 Daytona.
112	2	"Everybody Loves Raymond"	December 7, 2018
While Mark is out testing the completed 1968 Charger, the owner shows up for a surprise visit! While the owner waits, Will finishes the paint job on a beautiful 1970 Challenger in B5 Blue.
113	3	"Upshift Creek"	December 14, 2018
Mark has been invited to a massive car show at the Little Creek Casino but before he can go, Mark and Doug need to disassemble the Phoenix 'Cuda: a car that survived a garage fire; Allysa and Will meet the fans and find their pick of the show.
114	4	"It's A Duster Buster"	December 21, 2018
Mark teaches Allysa the finer points of installing a grill and headlights on her 1972 Duster; George attacks a tricky quarter panel to a 1969 'Cuda.
115	5	"Carbituary: Charger"	February 28, 2018
In a special episode, Mark shows unique differences, surprising insights and cool features on multiple years of the same car: the Dodge Charger.
116	6	"1.5 Million Dollar Baby"	January 4, 2019
The crew installs the grill, bumper, dash and interior of the '68 Turbine Bronze Charger; when a familiar face shows up, the crew shifts their focus to a super rare '70 Coronet and finishes the interior.
117	7	"Willie, Paint it Black?"	January 11, 2019
With SEMA 2018 looming on the horizon, it's time to address the elephant in the room: Mark's 1964 A100 Hemi truck; The Little Dead Wagon, built as an homage to Bill Maverick's Little Red Wagon, gets new paint and a super powerful engine.
118	8	"The A100 Team"	February 5, 2019
Mark and the Ghouls get down to work like never before in order to get the A100 ready for SEMA, which is only weeks away; the Mopar Maniacs race to get brakes, suspension, bed sealer, tail lights and more done in time.
119	9	"Night of the Little Dead Wagon"	February 12, 2019
SEMA is almost here but the iconic A100 still needs some buttoning up; installing all of the final components means it's all-hands-on-deck; the team heads to SEMA to roll the Little Dead Wagon over the red carpet for Mopar.
120	10	"Carbiturary: Cuda"	February 19, 2019
When Mark gets started talking about a car, there is almost no stopping him. In this episode, Mark shares multiple years of his favorite Mopar builds--detailing the amazing options and the cool differences. The team joins in the fun.
121	11	"Duster In The Wind"	February 26, 2019
Progress never stops at Graveyard Carz. SEMA is over the Ghouls can finally get back to work on all the cars they had to leave untouched for the last few weeks. First up is a beautiful 1972 Duster
122	12	"B5 Before and After"	March 7, 2018
123	13	"The Last WS27R on Earth"	March 12, 2019
Brett Torino is coming to claim his legendary 1970 Coronet (1 of 2 ever made) from its long awaited restoration with the Mopar Master and Mark's got a few tricks up his sleeve; the epic reveal, like this vehicle, is absolutely one of a kind.
124	14	"Taking Home the Bronze"	March 19, 2019
See the beautiful Turbine-Bonze Metallic 1968 Charger meticulously resurrected and revealed to its proud owner.
125	15	"Hellephant in the Room"	March 26, 2019
126	16	"Rallye the Troops"	April 2, 2019
Mark leaves Will in charge of the shop while working on his super-secret SEMA 2019 build; George and Dougie to begin the final assembly to the 1970 B7 Challenger while contending with Will; a 1970 'Cuda is prepped for its first coat of Rallye Red.
127	17	"This Is Boring"	April 9, 2019
Mark takes a road trip to Boring, Ore., to look at a new restoration project; when it turns out to be an unusually well-preserved muscle-car, Mark must work outside his comfort zone to try to wheel and deal.
128	18	"Allysa's Billboard Hit"	April 16, 2019
Allysa and Dougie finish building out the 440 engine for the 1968 GTX currently in assembly; Allysa and Mark begin one of the most difficult decal applications, a White Billboard for the 1970 'Cuda Convertible.
129	19	"Raise the Roof"	April 23, 2019
Dougie does a deep dive when he completely builds out the rear end assembly for the 1969 GTX; Mark and George break out the hydraulics to reverse the damage done to Mark's newest acquisition; a Graveyard favorite returns.
130	20	"Hellafury"	April 30, 2019
The Graveyard is covered in an unexpected blanket of snow, prompting Mark to install its first mausoleum; the ghouls focus on a 1969 GTX, installing ornamentation and chrome; Mark takes over the airwaves to announce what he's building for SEMA.
131	21	"To Beep, or Not to Beep"	May 7, 2019
While the ghouls finish up the ornamentation and chrome moldings for the 1969 GTX, Cousin Dougie enlists the Greenhorn's help to disassemble the first 1970 Road Runner - with careful precision to hopefully find the car's broadcast sheet.
132	22	"Amentini, Shaken Not Stirred"	May 14, 2019
The 1970 Challenger in B7 Blue owned by the Amentinis is finished and ready to be revealed; witnessing every moment of its restoration, from dead to resurrected and detailed to the way it left the factory floor.
133	23	"Dougon'it"	May 21, 2019
Whether it's building an engine, restoring parts, or hiding mannequins, Cousin Dougie is on it; he's one of the most pivotal Ghouls, working on a vast number of Mopar restoration projects or tasks that are essential to the success of the shop.
134	24	"Baptism by Fire"	May 28, 2019
The Phoenix 'Cuda, the car that survived a deadly explosion, is ready for its purification; its rust and metal are seared away to expose its hidden sins; thus begins the first stage of its monumental rebirth.
135	25	"Parking In-Violetion"	June 4, 2019
The ghouls shift into high gear to make progress on the In-Violet 1971 'Cuda convertible; work begins on the SEMA 2019 build.
136	26	"The Reel Life of GYC"	June 11, 2019
Since 2012, the show has become synonymous with high-quality Mopar restoration and continues to grow with new builds and fans each year; pulling back the curtain to reveal the cast and crew's favorite moments and what they hope to build next.

=== Season 11 (2019–20) ===
No. overall	No. in season	Title	Original release date
137	1	"Gimme The Green-Light"	December 10, 2019
The crew begins door and panel alignment on a '69 Charger, and finds some surprises while disassembling Christine. When a rare Hemi Coronet returns, Mark realizes he's spread too thin to catch important quality-control issues.
138	2	"Take it to the Limit"	December 17, 2019
While the crew works on final assembly for a problematic '69 GTX, Allysa discovers they face major fines following an OSHA inspection. The network rejects a scene and forces Mark to review comedy routines he's done in the past.
139	3	"For the Love of Money"	December 24, 2019
The crew mocks up Christine's engine over the frame, and Will preps and paints a 1966 Charger. When an important piece of equipment breaks down, Allysa has to figure out what happened and get it fixed.
140	4	"Whole Lotta Love"	December 31, 2019
The crew focuses on a '71 In-Violet 'Cuda convertible, while Will primes Tony D'Agostino's '70 Plum Crazy Challenger. Mark ignores his birthday, and realizes that a car lined up for restoration may not be worth the effort.
141	5	"It Don't Come Easy"	February 7, 2020
The Ghouls continue to work on the '71 In-Violet 'Cuda convertible, while Christine's metalwork begins. When Tony shows up unexpectedly, Mark dodges his questions about the status of his car.
142	6	"You Can't Always Get What You Want"	January 14, 2020
The ghouls shift gears to work on a 1970 Rallye Red 'Cuda, while Mark and Tony assess a 1964 Plymouth Fury. The crew is forced to make some tough choices between doing what's right for the show and keeping Mark happy.
143	7	"You're the One I Want"	January 21, 2020
The crew returns to form to continue the assembly on a beautiful In-Violet 1971 'Cuda convertible, Christine's frame is refitted, and the disassembly of a 225 slant-six sets the stage for a bet between Mark and Doug.
144	8	"Only the Strong Survive"	January 28, 2020
Mark redirects the crew to focus their efforts on a 1969 Superbee. The owner has been patient, but is eagerly awaiting delivery, and Mark doesn't want Christine or any other project to delay this classic muscle car build.
145	9	"A Long and Winding Road"	February 4, 2020
With final assembly finished, the 1970 Rallye Red 'Cuda is primed to be fired up and driven. Before it takes its maiden voyage, the crew takes a look back at what it took to restore this car and convert it from a 318 to a 440.
146	10	"Just The Way You Are"	February 11, 2020
One of eight ever made, the 1971 In Violet Plymouth 'Cuda 383 is finished and ready for delivery. Before the final touches, the crew reflects on the journey the car has taken and share unseen footage of the build.
147	11	"Bad to the Bone"	February 18, 2020
In a build too big for just one episode, the tribute 1958 Plymouth Fury, famously known as Christine, not only gets a full restoration with OE attention to detail, but gets a brand-new modern third-generation 426 Hemi.
148	12	"Beast of Burden"	March 25, 2020
With the SEMA Show 2019 just days away, the team scrambles to finish the assembly of the tribute "Christine." Mark begins to question how complete the car will be when it ships to the convention center in Las Vegas, Nevada.
149	13	"We Belong Together"	March 3, 2020
The destination is SEMA Show 2019 in Las Vegas, Nevada. As the ghouls visit with fans, they reflect on their accomplishments and failures and look ahead at the exciting upcoming restorations for the new year.

=== Season 12 (2020) ===
No. overall	No. in season	Title	Original release date
150	1	"There Will Be 'Cudas"	May 26, 2020
It's an episode of E-Bodies, including disassembly, documentation and suspicion that one of the newly arrived 'Cudas may have forged numbers.
151	2	"Full Metal Phoenix"	June 2, 2020
A pragmatic Mark Worman observes the metal restoration of the 1971 Phoenix 'Cuda. It's a painstaking task to undo the damage caused by the brutal fire in which it died.
152	3	"The Big Cheesesteak"	June 9, 2020
Tony "Cheesesteak" D'Agostino, the true Mopar guru, seeks updates on his wife's Plum Crazy Challenger and enlists his buddy Will to help get them.
153	4	"Perks of Being a Challenger"	June 16, 2020
The Ghouls give their care and attention to a Dodge Challenger, and welcome it to the next phase of its restoration
154	5	"The Road Runner Diaries - Part 1"	June 23, 2020
The Ghouls begin the 45-day restoration of a 1970 Road Runner. It's owned by tool creator Mark Martinez, who drove the car in his youth and believes it showed him his life's calling.
155	6	"The Road Runner Diaries - Part 2"	June 30, 2020
The Ghouls attempt to finish the 45-day restoration of a 1970 Road Runner, owned by tool creator Mark Martinez, who can't wait to take it for its first drive.
156	7	"The Fast and Furry-ous"	July 7, 2020
Mark must decide where his loyalty really lies when he becomes enamored with the Road Runners he has previously restored.
157	8	"Frankenstein's '71 Cuda"	July 14, 2020
Mark and George bust out the welders and rebuild the body for the deadest 1971 'Cuda they've ever encountered in the history of GYC.
158	9	"The Usual GTXs"	July 21, 2020
The finishing of a 1969 GTX sparks the tale of its shaky restoration leading up to its delivery. This is only the latest of five previously-restored GTXs that the crew has brought back from the dead.
159	10	"The Charger Syndrome"	July 28, 2020
160	11	"No Country For Old Chargers"	August 4, 2020
Nostalgic reminiscing ensues after Mark stumbles upon information about his childhood Charger while archiving files from past restorations.
161	12	"The Dayton's Advocate"	August 11, 2020
An exceptionally-kept survivor Daytona is finally getting the attention it deserves during assembly -- the last phase of its restoration.
162	13	"Greetings From SEMA"	August 18, 2020
The crew looks back at their biggest SEMA builds, and offers a sneak peek at what's to come.

=== Season 13 (2021) ===
Season 13 began on March 16, 2021.

== See also ==
- American Chopper
- American Hot Rod
- Overhaulin'
