= Historic Vehicle Association =

- Abbreviation: HVA
- Established: 2009; 17 years ago
- Type: club / society
- Purpose: promote the cultural and historical significance of the automobile, and protect the future of automotive history.
- Location: Gaithersburg, Maryland, U.S.
- Affiliations: Hagerty Insurance Agency
- Website: www.historicvehicle.org

The Historic Vehicle Association (HVA) was founded in 2009 in America to promote the cultural and historical significance of the automobile, and protect the future of automotive history. The society has been an influential part of the U.S. Department of the Interior's Historic American Engineering Record (a part of the Heritage Documentation Programs), and has helped identify historical significance and excellence in car making. With over 375,000 members, the HVA claims to be the world's largest historic vehicle owners' organization.

HVA was founded with philanthropic support of Hagerty, and became the designated North American representative of FIVA (Fédération Internationale des Véhicules Anciens), the international federation of historic vehicle organizations – both for the U.S. and Canada.

== Mission strategy ==
The Historic Vehicle Association aims to achieve its mission in four ways:

1. Documenting and recognizing historically important vehicles in a National Historic Vehicle Register.

2. Establishing and sharing best practice guidelines to ensure that authentic examples of automotive history will be available for future generations.

3. Promoting the historical and cultural significance of the automobile through media and events.

4. Protecting the future of automotive history through affiliations with museums and academic institutions, educational programs, and support of legislative action.

== Main projects ==
- National Historic Vehicle Register — in collaboration with the United States Department of the Interior, to create a permanent archive of significant historic automobiles within the Library of Congress.
- HVA produced documentary films about cars that have helped shape America
- "This Car Matters" documenting project

== Listing an automobile on the National Register of Historic Places ==
The National Register For Historic Places does allow an automobile to be included as either a historic object or historic structure. To date (2020) no state or commonwealth in the United States with historic property listings have an automobile individually listed. In 2014, a private attempt with the Pennsylvania Historic and Museum Commission to list a 1922 Model T Ford. The process went as far as the Keeper of the National Register and a listing in the Federal Register. Both the Commonwealth of Pennsylvania and The National Park Service rejected the nomination. (Federal Register/Vol. 79, No. 173/Monday, September 8, 2014.)(www.gpo.gov › fdsys › pkg › pdf).

== Vehicles on the register ==
From HVA Registry, including the Historic American Engineering Record (HAER) number

- 1981 DMC DeLorean "Time Machine" Hero Car Back to the Future Movie 1985 NHVR No. 29 HAER No. CA-2377
- 1964 Shelby Cobra Daytona Coupe CSX2287, HAER Number: PA-650
- 1964 Meyers Manx "Old Red", HAER Number: CA-2312
- 1938 Maserati 8CTF “Boyle Special "The Boyle Special", HAER Number: IN-112
- 1918 Cadillac U.S. 1257X, HAER Number: WA-225
- 1947 Tucker 48 Prototype "Tin Goose", HAER Number: PA-652
- 1940 GM Futurliner NO. 10, HAER Number: IN-114
- 1954 Mercedes-Benz 300 SL, HAER Number: PA-194
- 1940 Ford Pilot Model GP-No.1 (Pygmy), HAER Number: AL-213
- 1909 White Model 'M' Steam Car, HAER Number: MA-175
- 1962 Willy's ‘Jeep’ Universal Model CJ-6, HAER Number: CA-2320
- 1911 Marmon Wasp, HAER Number: IN-115
- 1907 Thomas Flyer, HAER Number: NV-49
- 1920 Anderson Six, HAER Number: SC-44
- 1938 Buick Y-Job, HAER Number: MI-417
- 1967 Chevrolet Camaro, HAER Number: KS-11
- 1932 Ford V-8 Roadster (McGee Roadster), HAER Number: CA-2327
- 1951 Mercury Sport Coupe (Hirohata Merc), HAER Number: CA-2328
- 1964 Chevrolet Impala (Gypsy Rose), HAER Number: CA-2329
- 1933 Graham 8 Sedan "Blue Streak", HAER Number: PA-654
- 1896 Benton Harbor Motor Carriage, HAER Number: PA-655
- 1968 Ford Mustang Fastback (Bullitt – ‘559), HAER Number: TN-53
- 1985 Modena Spyder (Ferris Bueller “Ferrari”), HAER Number: MD-192
- 1927 Ford Model T Touring (Fifteen-Millionth Ford), HAER Number: MI-419
- 1984 Plymouth Voyager (Magic Wagon No. 1), HAER Number: MI-420
- 1969 Chevrolet Corvette Stingray (driven by Alan Bean, the fourth person to walk on the Moon), HAER Number: TX-3404
