= Before We Ruled the Earth =

Television documentary

- Narrated by: Linda Hunt
- Composer: Dean Grinsfelder
- Country of origin: United States
- No. of seasons: 1
- No. of episodes: 2

Production
- Executive producers: Pierre de Lespinois; Fran LoCascio
- Running time: 49 minutes

Original release
- Network: Discovery Channel
- Release: February 9, 2003

Before We Ruled the Earth is a two-part documentary television miniseries that premiered on February 9, 2003 on the Discovery Channel. The program featured early human history and the challenges human beings faced from 1.5 million years ago to the modern era. The first episode was called "Hunt or Be Hunted" and the second called "Mastering the Beasts." It features hominids like Homo ergaster, Homo erectus, and Homo sapiens.

It also features prehistoric animals like Megantereon, Bison priscus, and Woolly Mammoth (Mammuthus primigenius).

Some of the information is now outdated such as neanderthals not being able to throw spears at prey which is now possible for neanderthals because of the 300,000 year old Schöningen Spears, Early modern humans consuming poisonous berries for hallucination for spiritual rituals, and the incorrect way of Neanderthals hunting their prey.
