= BlackInAstro =

Black In Astro
- Formation: 2020
- Founder: Ashley Walker
- Purpose: Academia, Activism
- Website: https://www.blackinastro.com/

BlackInAstro is an organization that was founded with the purpose to celebrate and amplify the voices of Black scientists and engineers in the space community. The organization and the broader movement are intended to highlight visibility of Black scientists, researchers and engineers that are often marginalized and face discrimination and other challenges while navigating academia.

== Origins ==
The organisation was founded in 2020 by astrochemist and organiser Ashley Walker. The aim of the organisation is to offer support and networking opportunities for Black people who work or study astronomy and space-related fields, which includes the humanities. The organisation hold year-round events, such as their annual "Black Space Week", to increase visibility of Black people in space-related fields and to increase Black representation in space.

Walker founded Black in Astro following Black Birders Week - an event in response to the Central Park birdwatching incident and police brutality against Black Americans. It is a part of a social media movement to highlight the contributions of Black scientists, including other organisations such as BlackinChem and Black In Neuro. As of 2020, about 2% of Bachelors' and PhD degrees in the US in astronomy were awarded to Black students, while Black academics also experience higher rates of discrimination compared to their white peers.

Its current leadership consists of Walker, Dr. Caprice Phillips, KeShawn Ivory, Naia Butler-Craig, Cheyenne Polius, Robert Washington, and AJ Link.

== Awards ==
In 2022, Black in Astro received an award from the Heising-Simons Foundation to fund events and programming for Black Space Week. The Royal Astronomical Society awarded Black in Astro the 2023 Annie S. D. Maunder Medal for outreach or public engagement in astronomy or geophysics, highlighting "their dedication to fostering joy and authenticity for all Black people interested in STEM."

== See also ==
- Black In Neuro
- BlackinChem
