= Corina Newsome =

American ornithologist and science communicator

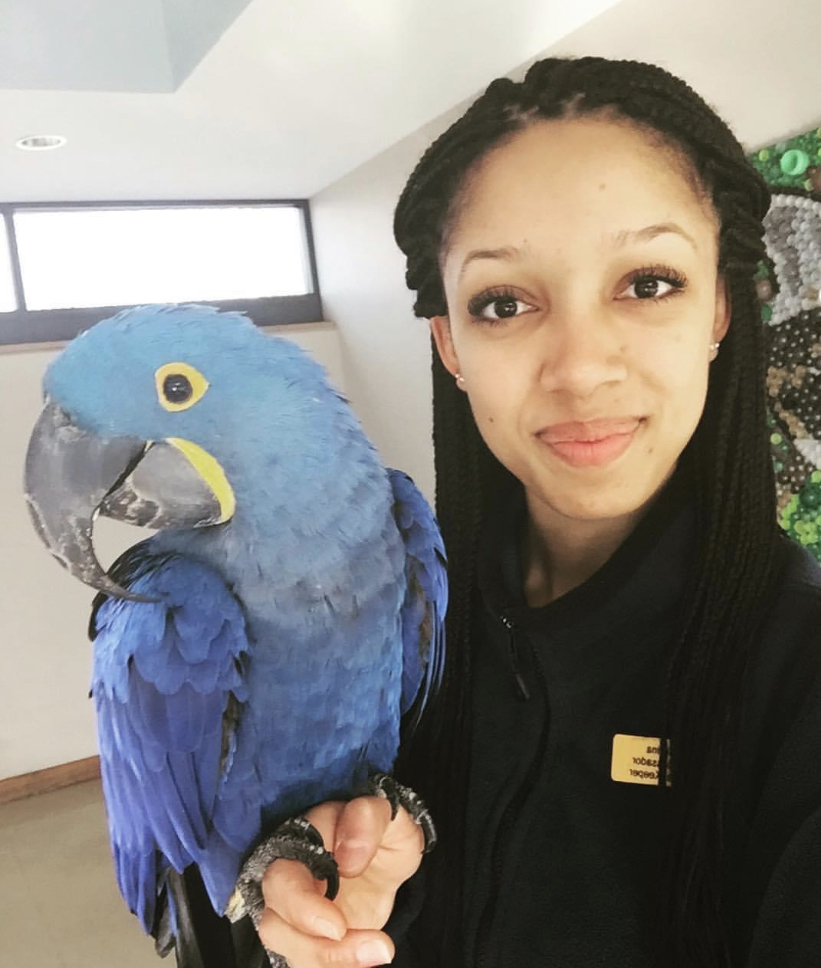
- Education: Georgia Southern University; Malone University
- Scientific career
- Fields: Ornithology

Corina Newsome is an American ornithologist, birder, science communicator, and graduate student at Georgia Southern University. In response to the racism faced by Black birder Christian Cooper in Central Park, Newsome co-organized Black Birders Week to celebrate Black birders.

== Early life and education ==
Newsome grew up in Germantown, Philadelphia, and obtained her Bachelor of Arts in zoo and wildlife biology from Malone University in 2015. She was inspired to pursue a career in ornithology after learning about blue jays in her ornithology field class. Newsome is currently a graduate student at Georgia Southern University, focusing on avian conservation.

== Career ==
Newsome worked as a zookeeper at the Nashville Zoo, where she specialised in outreach, environmental education, and training animals. She has also worked at the Philadelphia Zoo and Cleveland Metroparks Zoo. Currently, Newsome's graduate research is focused on studying the roles of climate change and predation on MacGillivray's seaside sparrows.

Newsome is also a writer for the magazine BBC Wildlife.

=== Diversity and outreach ===
Newsome developed the Pathway to Animal Care Careers program at the Nashville Zoo and served as the director of the Malone University Wildlife Careers Program to provide career exposure for high school students from low income backgrounds.

Newsome runs a Twitter account and blog, using the name Hood Naturalist, to communicate science, advocate for environmental equality and promote diversity in biology and other scientific careers. The nickname "Hood Naturalist" reflects her upbringing in an urban environment, and is an attempt to counter the assumption that all naturalists grow up in rural or wilderness areas. Her research and science outreach efforts have been featured in a number of podcasts and radio shows, such as NPR's Short Wave, Ologies with Alie Ward, and Science Friday, and was cast in the 2017 environmental documentary film Behold the Earth.

In April 2019, Newsome was part of a team of women who criticised Discovery's response to science through song. Their response was a lip-synced music video set to "Let Me Blow Ya Mind", and portrayed a diverse bunch of women doing science, demonstrating that science is for everyone. Later in April 2019, Newsome released a rap music video, "Anything For The Count", a remix of "Clout" by rapper Offset. The video demonstrated her love for birding and why it is important to study and protect birds.

In 2020, to respond to a series of events including the murder of Ahmaud Arbery, an unarmed Black man who was shot while running nearby Newsome's field site in southern Georgia and the racism faced by Black birder Christian Cooper in the Central Park birdwatching incident, Newsome and Earyn McGee co-organised Black Birders Week, a weeklong series celebrating Black birders and Black nature enthusiasts on social media. Black Birders Week garnered worldwide media coverage, including features in National Geographic, Scientific American, and Forbes. Additionally, the inaugural Black Birders Week produced unique content in collaboration with the National Audubon Society and the Monterey Bay Aquarium.

=== Awards and honors ===
- Humans2020, Motherboard by Vice, 2020
- Inverse Magazine's Future 50 Forces for Good in the 2020s, 2020
- Grist 50 Fixers, 2020

== Personal life ==
Outside of her studies, Newsome also enjoys birding.
