= Chelsea Connor =

Dominican herpetologist and birder

- Born: Chelsea Connor; Dominica
- Education: Midwestern State University
- Scientific career
- Fields: Herpetology

Chelsea Connor is a Dominican herpetologist and birder. Her research concerns the interaction between native and introduced Anolis lizards in the Commonwealth of Dominica. While a student, she co-founded #BlackBirdersWeek. She is an advocate for Black people in the United States being out in nature, and feeling safer when they do so.

== Personal life ==
Connor grew up as a Black, queer woman in the Commonwealth of Dominica, part of the southeast Caribbean island group the Lesser Antilles. She developed a love of birds from watching flocks of sugarbirds (Coereba flaveola) and seeing Sisserou parrots (Amazona imperialis) for the first time.

== Research ==
Connor studies the dietary overlap between invasive and native anoles (Anolis spp.) in Dominica. Her undergraduate project at Midwestern State University, Texas in the lab of Charles M. Watson, examined the diets of Anolis oculatus and invasive Anolis cristatellus; she found few prey species in common, indicating possible niche partitioning to avoid competition. She continued working on anoles as a graduate student at Midwestern State University in Texas.

== #BlackBirdersWeek ==
In May 2020, birder Christian Cooper was harassed in Central Park while watching birds—a white woman called the police on him. Connor empathised; she had also experienced suspicion while birding, with people believing because a Black person outside with binoculars must be doing something wrong. In response to Central Park birdwatching incident, Connor along with several other Black scientists founded Black Birders Week; others include Anna Gifty Opoku-Agyeman, Jason Ward, Sheridan Alford, Danielle Belleny, Joseph Saunders, and Tykee James. The National Audubon Society supported the program, which first ran May 31 to June 5, 2020.

Each day the social media campaign #BlackBirdersWeek had a different theme: #BlackWomenWhoBird, posting a picture of yourself in nature, #PostABird, and Question and Answer with Black birders.

Connor celebrates bird watching in Black communities for a week each year. She advocates for Black people and their rights. She encourages people from diverse backgrounds to observe and enjoy nature, especially groups that historically marginalised in predominantly white activities like birding: “It is upsetting to see that it is still so unsafe for a lot of Black people to go outside, and to do what they love doing outside.”
