= Ashley Walker (astrochemist) =

Astrochemist, science communicator, and activist

Ashley Lindalía Walker
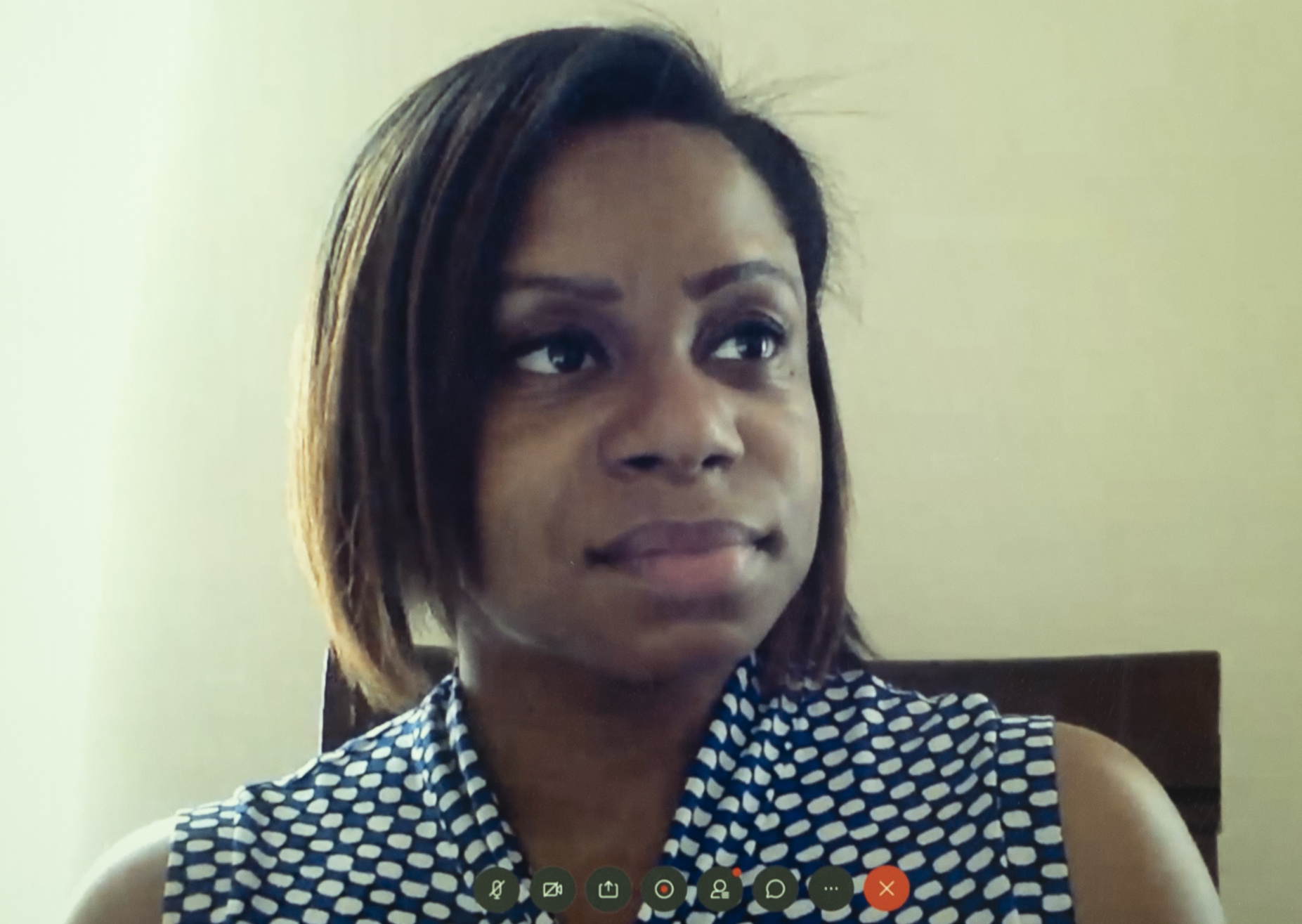
- Born: Chicago, Illinois
- Education: Chicago State University, 2020 (BS)
- Scientific career
- Fields: Astrochemistry, Science Communication
- Workplaces: Goddard Space Flight Center

Ashley Lindalía Walker is an astrochemist, science communicator, and activist. In response to police brutality against Black Americans and sparked by the success of Black Birders Week, Walker co-organized #BlackinChem, #BlackInAstro, and #BlackInPhysics to highlight and amplify the voices of Black researchers and scholars in these fields.

== Early life and education ==
Walker was raised in Chicago's Englewood neighborhood where she developed an interest in science, enjoying visits to the Adler Planetarium. Despite this interest in science, she pursued a degree in business at City College of Chicago, eventually changing her major to forensic chemistry and transferring to Chicago State University. There, she became the university's first to develop her own astrochemistry major, training and collaborating with planetary scientists and computational chemists to study the chemical compositions of planetary atmospheres. During the course of her undergraduate career, she was admitted into the Banneker Institute program at Harvard University, where she worked in Karin Öberg's research group modeling hydrogen cyanide in protoplanetary disks. She then worked in the research group of planetary scientist Sarah Hörst, studying tholins, which are organic compounds that when combined with water can be raw materials for prebiotic chemistry, on Titan. The project served as the basis of her senior thesis. She later worked as a research assistant at the Goddard Space Flight Center where she was able to study the atmospheric composition of Saturn's moon Titan using infrared spectroscopy under the mentorship of planetary scientist Carrie Anderson.

== Science communication and advocacy ==
Walker has leveraged her social media platforms and networks within astronomy and planetary sciences to advocate for Black women and nonbinary individuals pursuing careers in science, technology, engineering, and mathematics (STEM). In 2019, she organized an event at the Adler Planetarium to highlight Black women in astrochemistry and planetary sciences as part of the Wakandacon convention. Building on the success of Black Birders Week, an online campaign that highlighted Black nature enthusiasts and increased the visibility of Black birders, Walker co-organized #BlackInAstro, #BlackInChem, and #BlackInPhysics weeks. In addition to highlighting Black scientists leading in those fields, the campaigns also advocated for eliminating graduate programs' reliance on the Graduate Record Examinations (GREs) and highlighting internships, funding support, and other career development opportunities for early career Black researchers. The inaugural #BlackInChem produced content in collaboration with the Royal Society of Chemistry and the American Chemical Society, while #BlackInAstro partnered with the American Astronomical Society's Astrobites to produce curated content for the week. These campaigns were collectively recognized by the journal Science as a finalist for 2020 Breakthrough of the Year.

Walker is also a member of the American Astronomical Society, where she serves as the most junior member of the Society's Committee on the Status of Minorities in Astronomy with Louise O. V. Edwards.

== Personal life ==
While an undergraduate, she lost her father, Kenneth Lovell, to lung cancer. After his death, she was mistakenly declared dead because she was listed as an informant on his death certificate, which placed her financial aid for college in jeopardy. She was able to raise over $8,000 in donations to complete her spring semester, as well as a summer fellowship at Harvard University. Walker is currently enrolled at Howard University, where she is pursuing a doctorate degree in atmospheric science.
