= Earyn McGee =

American herpetologist

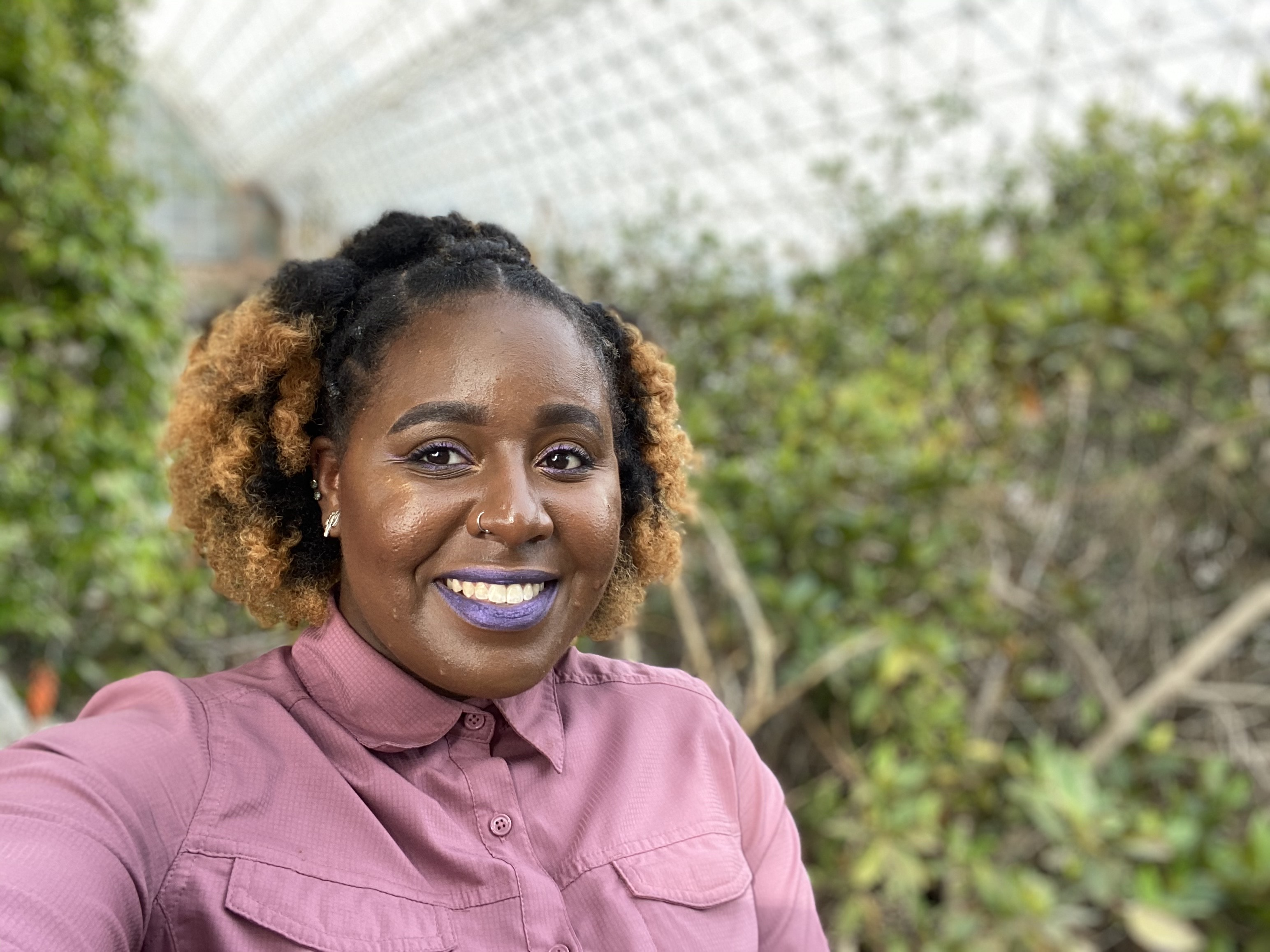
- McGee at Biosphere 2 in Oracle, Arizona
- Education: Howard University (BSc); University of Arizona (PhD)
- Known for: Black Birders Week #IfThenSheCan The Exhibit
- Scientific career
- Fields: Herpetology
- Workplaces: University of Arizona

Earyn McGee is an American herpetologist and science communicator. She is an American Association for the Advancement of Science (AAAS) IF/THEN Ambassador and a 2020 AAAS Mass Media Science & Engineering Fellow. In response to the racism faced by Black birdwatcher Christian Cooper in the Central Park birdwatching incident, McGee and Corina Newsome co-organized Black Birders Week to celebrate Black birders.

== Early life and education ==
Growing up in Inglewood, California, McGee completed an undergraduate degree in conservation biology at Howard University, where she was an Environmental Biology Scholar. Her summer undergraduate research involved studying Yarrow's spiny lizard in the Cave Creek Canyon of the Chiricahua Mountains. In 2018, McGee completed a Master's degree in the School of Natural Resources and the Environment at the University of Arizona, with a focus in wildlife conservation and management.

== Research career ==
McGee obtained her PhD in natural resources, with an emphasis in wildlife conservation and management, from the University of Arizona, where she studied the effects of stream drying on lizard communities in the Chiricahua Mountains of Arizona. She is an American Association for the Advancement of Science (AAAS) IF/THEN Ambassador, and studies how to use social media to bring more African American women into careers involving water and land management.

== Science outreach and communication ==
In April 2019, the Discovery Channel released a promotional video showing various scientists at work, which was criticised for the low number of women in the video. McGee was one of a team of female scientists who appeared in a response video, which portrayed a diverse group of women performing similar scientific tasks.

In 2020, she was selected by the American Association for the Advancement of Sciences (AAAS) to become a 2020 Mass Media Science & Engineering Fellow, where she contributes to the Las Vegas Review Journal.

McGee is active on Twitter as @Afro_Herper. Each Wednesday, she hosts a two-day Twitter identification challenge #FindThatLizard where she shares images and facts about lizards under the hashtag, #FindThatLizard. Her research and science outreach efforts have also been featured in several podcasts, including the science and comedy podcast Ologies, with Alie Ward.

As part of the BlackAFinSTEM group, she and Corina Newsome were two of the co-organizers of Black Birders Week, a social media campaign aimed at celebrating Black naturalists, scholars, and birders. The initiative was a response to the racism faced by Black birdwatcher Christian Cooper in the Central Park birdwatching incident. The hashtags created by the initiative, #BlackInNature and #BlackBirdersWeek, were used several thousand times. The project garnered worldwide media coverage, including a feature in National Geographic, Scientific American, and Forbes. It produced unique content in collaboration with the National Audubon Society and the Monterey Bay Aquarium.

In February 2020, Popular Mechanics chose McGee as one of ten influential women in science communication and for science content. Forbes named her as one of their 30 Under 30 in the "Science" category for 2021. As an American Association for the Advancement of Science (AAAS) IF/THEN Ambassador, McGee appears a statue in the #IfThenSheCan The Exhibit.

== Awards ==
Received the National Conservation Young Leader Award from the National Wildlife Federation in 2021.

== Selected bibliography ==
- McGee, Earyn; Manka-Worthington, Sarah; Bogan, Michael (2019). "Novel Fecal Collection Technique" (PDF). Herpetological Review. 50 (3): 518.
- Puritty, Chandler; Strickland, Lynette R.; Alia, Eanas; Blonder, Benjamin; Klein, Emily; Kohl, Michel T.; McGee, Earyn; Quintana, Maclovia; Ridley, Robyn E.; Tellman, Beth; Gerber, Leah R. (2017). "Without inclusion, diversity initiatives may not be enough". Science. 357 (6356): 1101–1102. Bibcode:2017Sci...357.1101P. doi:10.1126/science.aai9054. PMID 28912234. S2CID 206653434.
- Robinson, Courtney J.; London-Thomas, Laricca Y.; Dickson, Leon A.; Clinton, Tiffany A.; Baig, Hana; Bute, Maude; Fahad, Mohammed; Farrakhan, Kanhai; Grady, Neshaun; Guthrie, Nicholas E.; Hafid, Ruoa; Harvey, Jayla; Hunnicutt, Kellie; Larsen, Victoria L.; McDuffie, Taashaylaray; McGee, Earyn N.; Pailin, Jillian Y.; Peacock, Bria; Thomas, Antolice; Anderson, Winston A. (2016). "Genome Sequence of Mycobacteriophage ErnieJ". Genome Announcements. 4 (6). American Society for Microbiology. doi:10.1128/genomeA.00873-16. PMC 5122674. PMID 27881532.
