= Dara M. Wilson =

American naturalist and science educator

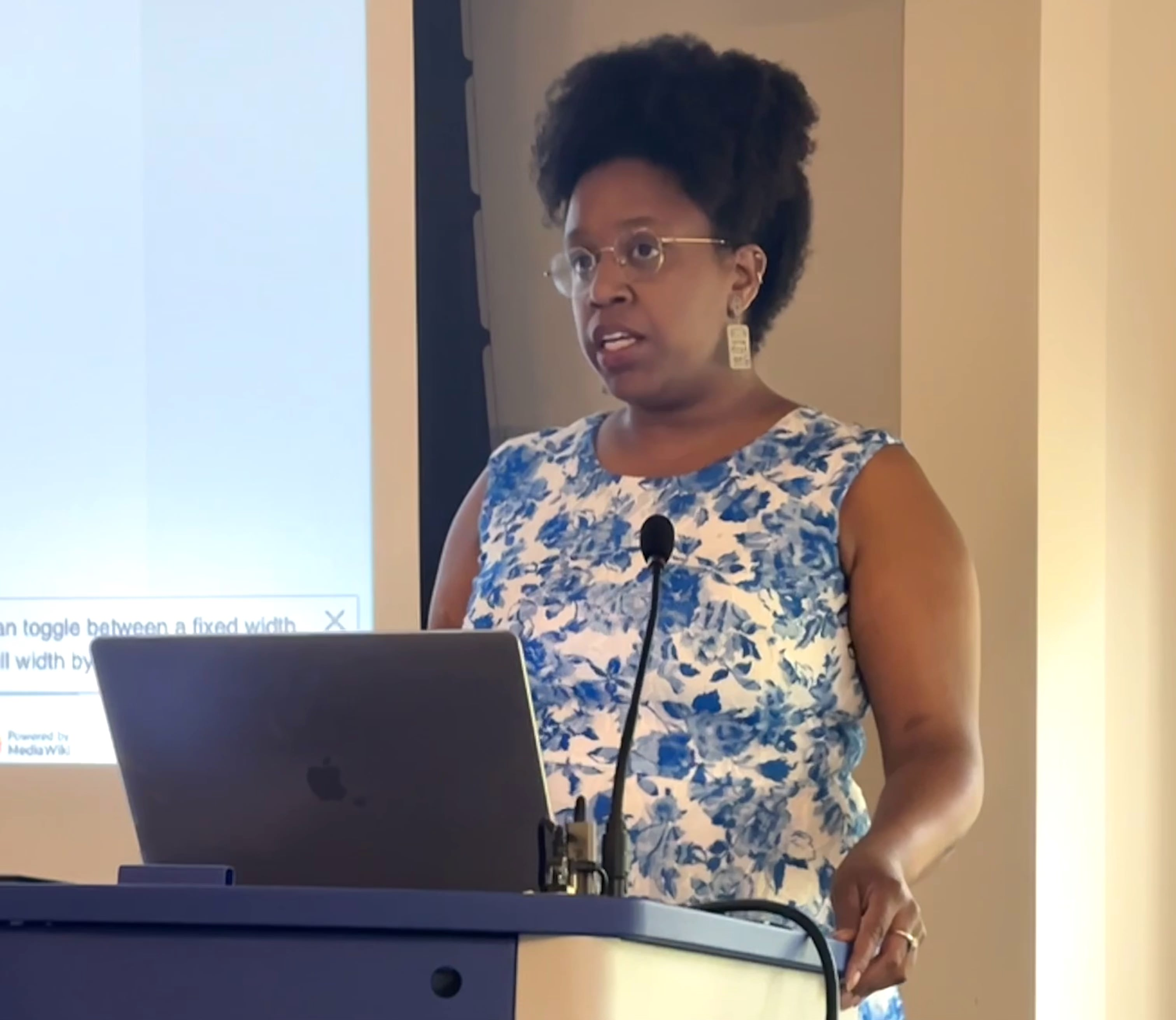
- Occupation: Naturalist, science teacher
- Employer: National Zoological Park (2013–2014)
- Position held: education program lead, honorary member (2022–2023), board of directors member (2022–2025)

Dara M. Wilson is a naturalist, science educator, and co-chair of the Black Birders Week Advisory Group. She has been awarded the 2022-2023 Vanguard Fellow by the Cecil Corbin-Mark Vanguard Fellowship program. She has also worked with the Smithsonian Institution to raise awareness of Black Birders Week.

== Career ==
Wilson studied international development. She worked for the Bolivian organization, Comunidad Inti Wara Yassi. From 2013 to 2014, Wilson worked at the National Zoological Park. In 2020, Wilson was an instructor for a program called "Tots and Trails." Additionally, Wilson was featured on Season 6 episode 1 of PBS's Local Routes that aired on October 8, 2020. Wilson has spoken out about her experience as a Black woman birder and participated in the first ever Black Birder Week in 2020 after the Central Park birdwatching incident.

Wilson was named as 2022-2023 Vanguard Fellow by the Cecil Corbin-Mark Vanguard Fellowship, which describes itself as a green leadership trust program. As of May 2022, Wilson works as the Director of Education at ReThink Energy Florida and was a member of the Black Birders Week Advisory Group, which helped organize Black Birders Week. In 2023, Wilson was the co-chair of the Black Birders Week Advisory Group. On May 17, 2023, Wilson was the keynote speaker for a Wikipedia Edit-a-thon located in Washington D.C. and hosted by the Smithsonian National Museum of Natural History and the Smithsonian American Women's History Museum.

Wilson has also served on several organizations' boards. In 2020, she served on the board of both the Apalachee Chapter of the Audubon Society and Friends of Wakulla Springs State Park. Wilson is also a member of the Audubon Society of the District of Columbia's Board of Directors starting in 2022 until 2025.
