= Amy Cooper =

Amy or Aimee Cooper may refer to:

- Amy Cooper in Central Park birdwatching incident
- Amy Farrah Fowler, wife of Sheldon Cooper
- List of Home and Away characters (2002)#Aimee Cooper
