= Letters to a Pre-Scientist =

STEM education outreach program

- Formation: 2010
- Key people: Lucy Madden (CEO), Macon Lowman (founder), Anna Goldstein (founder, Board of Directors)
- Staff: 2
- Volunteers: 1000+
- Website: https://www.prescientist.org

Letters to a Pre-Scientist (LPS) is a STEM education pen pal program that connects fifth to twelfth grade students in low-income schools with STEM professional volunteers, who write snail mail letters back and forth throughout a school year. The program’s mission is to help students of all backgrounds see themselves as future STEM professionals. As of 2021, the program has reached over 6,000 students in schools across 13 states.

== History ==
Founder Macon Lowman created an informal version of the program in 2010 to help her sixth grade science students connect what they were learning in class to the real world. Together with scientist and co-founder Anna Goldstein, they recruited enough STEM professional pen pals for every student in her class.

In 2014, the program expanded to 3 classrooms and has continued to grow, running in 24 classrooms in the 2019-2020 school year. Although the program only runs in U.S. classrooms, STEM professionals living anywhere in the world can participate.

The Letters to a Pre-Scientist program became a registered 501(c)(3) non-profit, under the official name Pre-Scientist, Inc. in 2019.

== Partnerships ==
Letters to a Pre-Scientist partnered with Arab Women in STEM during the 2020-2021 school year to increase the representation of Arab women in STEM in their volunteer network and translate program materials into Arabic so students could participate in their native language.

During the 2021-2022 school year, Letters to a Pre-Scientist partnered with Black in Neuro to match a predominantly Black sixth grade class in Ohio with predominantly Black neuroscientist pen pals.

Additionally, LPS partnered with Queer Engineer to increase representation of STEM professionals who identify as members of the LGBTQIA+ community in their pen pal network and increase the organization’s capacity to support students, teachers, and STEM pen pals with conversations about LGBTQIA+ related topics.

== Recognition and Funders ==
In 2018, LPS was one of the top 10 nominees for the Nature Research Innovating Science Award.

In 2021, LPS joined the Science Sandbox community of awardees funded by the Simons Foundation.
