= Nicole Jackson =

Nicole Jackson may refer to:

- Nicole Jackson (birder), American conservationist
- Nicole Jackson (ice hockey) (born 1992), English ice hockey goaltender
- Nicole Jackson (The Killing), fictional character

== See also ==
- Nicola Jackson (born 1984), British swimmer
- Nicola Jackson (artist) (born 1960), New Zealand artist
