= Devin J Swiner =

Devin J. Swiner is an American analytical chemist working as a pharmaceutical scientist. Her work involves the use of mass spectrometry for small molecule detection as well as the development of analytical methods for pharmaceuticals. She is a senior scientist at Merck. She is also a co-founder of BlackInChem which is an initiative that promotes the visibility and representation of Black scientists in chemistry.

== Education and career ==
Swiner graduated in 2016 with a bachelor's degree in chemistry from the University of Pittsburgh. Shen then went on to complete her PhD in 2021 in the department of Analytical Chemistry at Ohio State University. Throughout her time as a graduate student, Swiner worked within the lab studying the detection of small molecules for potential clinical diagnostic applications. Then following her graduate studies, Swiner began working in the pharmaceutical industry. She joined Merck & Co., where her work has involved specializing in preclinical and late-stage drug product development for various therapeutic targets.

== Research ==
Swiner is an analytical chemist with special expertise in mass spectrometry for the analysis of small molecules in a variety of settings from the detection, identification, and quantification of small molecules. She explored the potential of various analytical techniques for use in clinical diagnostics in her academic work. Her work in the pharmaceutical industry has involved the development, application and evaluation of analytical methods used to test drug products.These methods can be used to characterize and evaluate pharmaceutical compounds during drug development.

== Science outreach and advocacy ==
In 2020, Swiner co-founded BlackInChem to raise awareness for black chemists and to bring them together. It is among the latest social media campaigns to amplify the work of Black Scientists and celebrate their successes. The online initiative organizes talks and discussions about the specific work as well as about professional experiences, and career development of Black researchers. Swiner has also participated in public discussions about diversity, representation, and mentorship within the chemical sciences. Overall, Swiner's advocacy work in promoting the visibility of Black Scientists in STEM has also led into the realm of science communication.
