= BlackinChem =

Campaign for diversity in the chemical sciences

BlackInChem
- BlackInChem; Part of George Floyd protests, Black Lives Matter
- Date: August 10, 2020
- Location: Worldwide
- Methods: Direct action

BlackInChem is an organization which aims to highlight and increase the visibility of black chemists. The organization was created as a response to Black Birders Week. The inaugural event ran from August 10 - 15, 2020.

== Origins ==
The initiative was part of a cluster of initiatives, including #BlackBirdersWeek, #BlackinNeuro, #BlackinAstro, #BlackinData, #BlackinGeoscience, #BlackinMicro, and others, prompted in part by the Central Park birdwatching incident and the murders of Black Americans such as Ahmaud Arbery and George Floyd, and the killing of Breonna Taylor.

According to co-founder Ayanna Jones, the goal of the initiative is "for Black chemists at all stages of their careers to network and to encourage one another along a journey that no one should have to undergo alone".

== #BlackChemistsWeek 2020 ==
The week-long event was conceived and organized by members of a group of science, technology, engineering, and mathematics (STEM) professionals and students. Key people included; Devin Swiner, Samantha Theresa Mensah, Ashley Walker, Kathleen Muloma-Rink, Ayanna Jones, Natérica das Neves Rodrigues Lopes, Munashe Crispen and Heidi Nelson-Quillin.

The inaugural event series ran from August 10 - 15, 2020, using the #BlackChemistsWeek hashtag on Twitter. Through these events and others, the series highlighted research carried out by Black chemists, and the racism and other hurdles experienced. The week was themed around several different areas of chemistry, including analytical, biological, inorganic, organic and physical. The week drew attention from several Black celebrities, including MC Hammer.

== Impact and legacy ==
BlackInChem week was covered by the Royal Society of Chemistry, Chemical & Engineering News, USA Today, and Chemistry World. In response to the 2020 series, the University of California, Los Angeles launched a campaign to raise $100,000 in order to support a lectureship and fellowships for Black scholars. The organizers intend to continue the series in future years. The #BlackinX movements were recognized by the journal Science as a finalist for 2020 Breakthrough of the Year. The BlackInChem team was awarded the 2021 Inclusion and Diversity Prize from the Royal Society of Chemistry.
