= Black In Neuro =

Campaign for diversity in the chemical sciences

- Part of George Floyd protests, Black Lives Matter
- Date: July 27, 2020
- Location: Worldwide
- Methods: Direct action

Black In Neuro is a non-profit organization that looks to connect, celebrate, and amplify Black voices working in neuroscience. In particular, Black In Neuro looked to increase visibility of Black neuroscientists, who face challenges in navigating the majority white world of academia. The grassroots initiative was launched as a response to the Black Lives Matter movement and the #BLACKandSTEM initiatives that were inspired worldwide. The inaugural Black In Neuro Week ran from July 27 – August 2, 2020, and they have hosted annual Black In Neuro Week events since in addition to other networking, mentorship, and professional development programming.

== Origins ==
In 2014 Danielle N. Lee coined the term #BLACKandSTEM to unite Black scientists and engineers around the world. Guided by both her work and the Black Lives Matter movement that followed the murder of George Floyd and the Central Park birdwatching incident, several #BLACKandSTEM programs were launched online. The first event, Black Birders Week, took place May 31 – June 5.

Inspired by Black Birders Week, current executive board president, Angeline Dukes, current president-elect Kaela Singleton, and many other Black scientists and allies came together to launch Black in Neuro, a grassroots effort to connect, empower and inspire Black scholars working in disciplines related to neuroscience. According to the Society for Neuroscience, at the time Black in Neuro launched, only 1% of neuroscience faculty in the United States identified as Black. The group called for white and non-Black people of colour to recognise their complicity in anti-Black racism. Black In Neuro primarily made use of social media, specifically Twitter, to amplify stories, share best practice and work to eliminate racism within neurosciences.

Black In Neuro has over one thousand members globally, with profiles of Black researchers working in neuro-related fields published on their website www.BlackInNeuro.com. The organisers of Black In Neuro wrote a perspective for The Journal of Neuroscience where they wrote, "as black trainees, our lab coats, degrees, and accolades are not bulletproof and do absolutely nothing to protect us from systemic racism".

== #BlackInNeuroWeek 2020 ==
The first Black In Neuro Week took place in the last week of July 2020, using the hashtag #BlackInNeuro on Twitter and other platforms. Each day involved considered different aspects of scientific life, including representation, education, access, creativity and outreach. The group also worked to celebrate the contributions of Black women to neuroscience. The discussions were recorded and saved on the BlackInNeuro YouTube channel.

The BLACKandSTEM initiatives did not only highlight the research carried out by black scientists, but also exposed the racism and other challenges that they experienced. The week drew attention from several celebrities, including MC Hammer.

== Impact and legacy ==
Black In Neuro Week was supported by over 60 individuals and institutional donors. It was covered by USA Today, Forbes, Raleigh News & Observer, Science News, and CBC News. In 2020 the journal Science, named the #BlackinX movements as a finalist for 2020 Breakthrough of the Year.

Black In Neuro arranged conferences and seminar series as well as a mentorship programme. The group continues to host Black In Neuro Week each Summer and has expanded from virtual-only events to also host in-person events throughout the year.
