= J. Drew Lanham =

American author, poet, and wildlife biologist

Joseph Drew Lanham is an American author, poet, and wildlife biologist who was awarded a MacArthur Fellowship in 2022 for his work "combining conservation science with personal, historical, and cultural narratives of nature."

== Biography ==
Raised in Edgefield, South Carolina, Lanham studied zoology at Clemson University, where he also earned a PhD in Forest Resources in 1997. He was named an Alumni Distinguished Professor at the university in 2012. He currently teaches several classes on birding and wildlife science. He describes his work in his own words as: "’Connecting the conservation dots’ is how I envision my research mission. My past work has focused on the impacts of forest management and other human activities on songbirds, herpetofauna, small mammals and butterflies. More recently I've begun to investigate how ethnicity (especially Black Americans) relate to wildlife and other conservation issues. I'm also interested in how birders and hunters might bridge philosophical gaps to effect conservation in a more holistic way."

His research focuses on songbird ecology. He is a board member of several conservation organizations, including the South Carolina Wildlife Federation, Audubon South Carolina, the Aldo Leopold Foundation, BirdNote, and the American Birding Association, and an advisory board member for the North American Association of Environmental Education. In 2016, he was named a Brandwein Fellow for his work in environmental education, and he has also been a fellow of Toyota TogetherGreen and the Clemson University Institute for Parks. Lanham is a Board member of the National Audubon Society; in 2019 he was awarded its Dan W. Lufkin Prize for Environmental Leadership, recognizing "individuals who have dedicated their entire lives to the environment". In his 20 years as a faculty member, he has taught courses, conducted research and outreach in woodland ecology, conservation biology, forest biodiversity, wildlife policy and conservation ornithology and has mentored more than 40 students.

Lanham is a strong advocate for the African American role in natural resources conservation, intrigued with how culture and ethnic prisms can bend perceptions of nature and its care. Lanham believes that conservation must be a blending of head and heart, rigorous science and evocative art. In 2013, Lanham wrote a piece for Orion Magazine titled "9 Rules for the Black Birdwatcher," drawing attention to the lack of Black birders and diversity in general among naturalists. The short piece inspired producer Ari Daniel and videographer Amanda Kowalski to create a short film with the same title for BirdNote, which quickly went viral on social media. In 2016 he wrote "Birding While Black." In 2017 he published the award-winning memoir The Home Place: Memoirs of a Colored Man's Love Affair with Nature. His book received the Reed Award from the Southern Environmental Law Center and the Southern Book Prize, and was a finalist for the John Burroughs Medal. The book was listed in The Chronicle of Higher Education as one of the 11 best scholarly books of the 2010s, chosen by Anna Tsing. Lanham features in episode 7 of the 2019 TV series Birds of North America, produced by Topic and hosted by Jason Ward. In 2020, the podcast This Is Love spoke with Lanham for their episode, "Prairie Warbler." In December 2020, he received the E. O. Wilson Biodiversity Award for Outstanding Science, Advocacy. In 2021, Lanham wrote an essay for the Autumn 2021 issue of Living Bird, entitled "Wildness on A Whim: Reflections On Whimbrel In The South Carolina Lowcountry." Lanham was recognized in February 2022 by the Post and Courier newspaper (Charleston, SC) as one of twelve Black Leaders in South Carolina.

== Personal life ==
Lanham is married to Janice Garrison Lanham, a senior lecturer in the School of Nursing at Clemson University. They have two adult children. He and his family live in the Upstate of South Carolina.

== Bibliography ==
=== Articles ===
Breeding bird assemblages of hurricane-created gaps and adjacent closed canopy forest in the southern Appalachians

CH Greenberg, JD Lanham

Habitat specificity and home‐range size as attributes of species vulnerability to extinction: a case study using sympatric rattlesnakes

JL Waldron, SH Bennett, SM Welch, ME Dorcas, JD Lanham, ...

Evaluation of herpetofaunal communities on upland streams and beaver-impounded streams in the Upper Piedmont of South Carolina

BS Metts, JD Lanham, KR Russell

Using behaviorally-based seasons to investigate canebrake rattlesnake (Crotalus horridus) movement patterns and habitat selection

JL Waldron, JD Lanham, SH Bennett

Macrohabitat factors affect day roost selection by eastern red bats and eastern pipistrelles in the southern Appalachian Mountains, USA

JM O'Keefe, SC Loeb, JD Lanham, HS Hill Jr

Short‐term effects of fire and other fuel reduction treatments on breeding birds in a southern Appalachian upland hardwood forest

CH Greenberg, AL Tomcho, JD Lanham, TA Waldrop, J Tomcho, ...

Comparison of anesthesia and marking techniques on stress and behavioral responses in two Desmognathus salamanders

Herpetofaunal response to gap and skidder-rut wetland creation in a southern bottomland hardwood forest

RB Cromer, JD Lanham, HH Hanlin

Influences of coarse woody debris on birds in southern forests

JD Lanham, DC Guynn Jr

Oak regeneration using the shelterwood-burn technique: management options and implications for songbird conservation in the southeastern United States

JD Lanham, PD Keyser, PH Brose, DH Van Lear

Quantifying clutter: a comparison of four methods and their relationship to bat detection

JM O'Keefe, SC Loeb, HS Hill Jr, JD Lanham

Birding by ear: a study of recreational specialization and soundscape preference

ZD Miller, JC Hallo, JL Sharp, RB Powell, JD Lanham

The Effects of Prescribed Burning and Thinning on Herpetofauna and Small Mammals in the Upper Piedmont of South Carolina: Preliminary Results of the Na tional Fire and Fire

ES Kilpatrick, DB Kubacz, DC Guynn Jr, JD Lanham, TA Waldrop

Composition and aboveground productivity of three seasonally flooded depressional forested wetlands in coastal South Carolina

WS Busbee, WH Conner, DM Allen, JD Lanham

Effects of riparian buffer width on activity and detection of common bats in the southern Appalachian Mountains

JM O'Keefe, SC Loeb, PD Gerard, JD Lanham

Long-term avian response to fire severity, repeated burning, and mechanical fuel reduction in upland hardwood forest

CH Greenberg, J Tomcho, A Livings-Tomcho, JD Lanham, TA Waldrop, ...

Monotypic nest site selection by Swainson's Warbler in the mountains of South Carolina

JD Lanham, SM Miller

Short-term effects of fuel reduction treatments on herpetofauna from the southeastern United States

ES Kilpatrick, TA Waldrop, JD Lanham, CH Greenberg, TH Contreras

OF THE NATIONAL FIRE AND FIRE SURROGATE STUDY

LA Zebehazy, JD Lanham, TA Waldrop

Habitat—area relationships of shrub-scrub birds in South Carolina.

JD Lanham, DC Guynn Jr

=== Poems ===
- Ode to Negroes Who Don't Ornithologize (2013—Flycatcher Online Poetry Journal)
- Because of Black Hands (2015—Flycatcher Online Poetry Journal)
