= Nashville Zoo at Grassmere =

Zoo in Nashville, Tennessee, United States

- Interactive map of Nashville Zoo at Grassmere
- 36°05′21″N 86°44′37″W
- Date opened: 1990, as Grassmere Wildlife Park
- Location: 3777 Nolensville Pike, Nashville, Tennessee, United States
- Land area: 188 acres (76 ha)
- No. of animals: 6,230
- No. of species: 339
- Annual visitors: 1.2 million
- Memberships: Association of Zoos and Aquariums
- Director: Butch Spyridon (Board chair); Rick Schwartz (President and CEO)
- Public transit: 52
- Website: www.nashvillezoo.org

The Nashville Zoo at Grassmere is a zoological garden and historic family farm located 6 miles (9.7 km) southeast of Downtown Nashville. As of 2014, the zoo was middle Tennessee's top paid attraction and contained 3,736 individual animals, encompassing 352 species. The zoo's site is approximately 188 acres (76 ha) in size and is an accredited member of the Association of Zoos and Aquariums. The zoo has around 1.2 million visitors a year.

== History ==
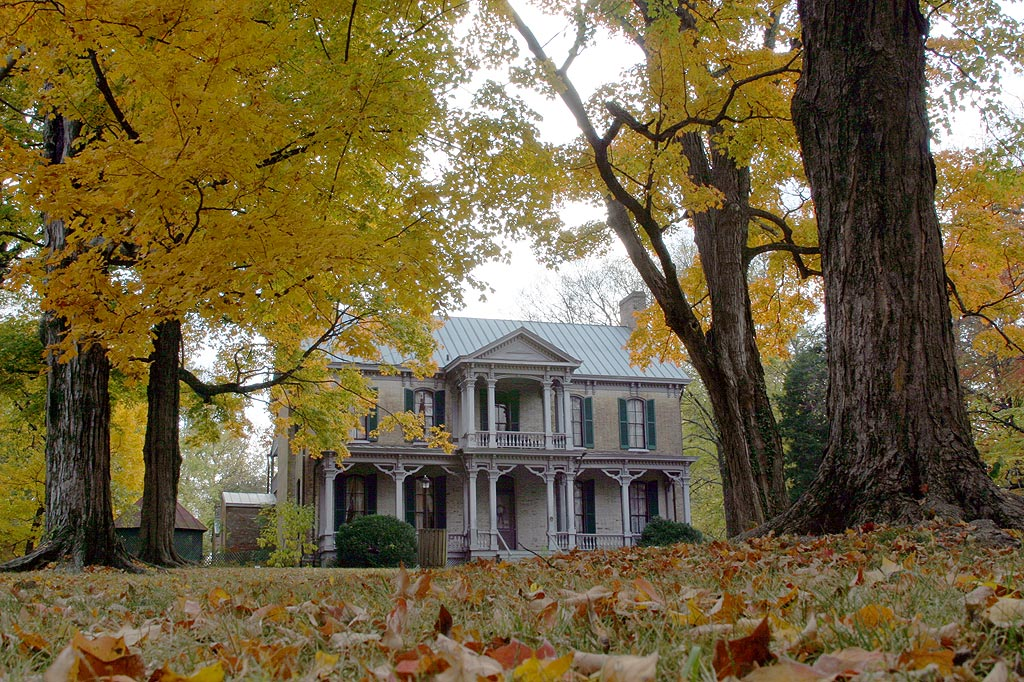
The Historic Grassmere Home

=== Dunn farm ===
Nashville Zoo is located on property that was once a 300-acre slaveholding farm owned by Michael and Elizabeth Dunn. The Dunn's original home, built in 1810 through slave labor, is still located on the property. Margaret and Elise Croft, the great-great granddaughters of Michael Dunn, the original owner, were the last of the family to live at this location. In 1989, archaeologists evaluating the property for its archaeological resources discovered an unmarked cemetery fairly close to Grassmere's entrance off of Nolensville Road. When construction for the zoo began in 1997, this graveyard was not disturbed. It was only in 2013 when a newer entry plaza was planned did the zoo petition to have the bodies exhumed and their remains moved closer to the historic Dunn house by the state archaeologist. This exhumation revealed 9 to 30 African-Americans who had been buried there.

=== Grassmere Wildlife Park ===
The Croft sisters deeded the land and family home to the Children's Museum of Nashville in 1964, with the agreement the house would remain and the land would be used as a 'nature study center.' After Elise's death in 1985, the museum began work on this nature study center, calling it Grassmere Wildlife Park.

=== Nashville Zoo ===
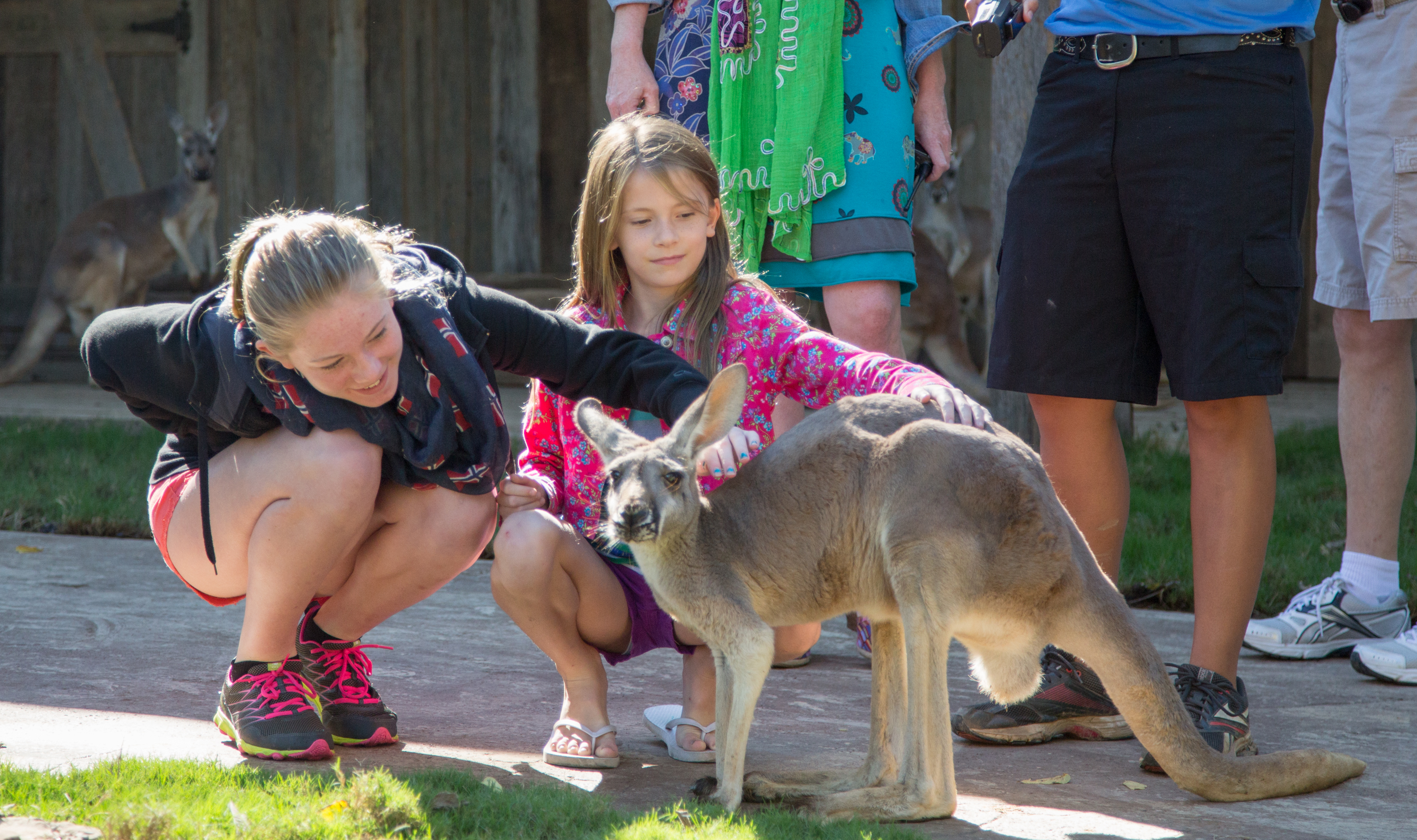
Interactions with red kangaroos at the Kangaroo Kickabout

In December 1994, Grassmere Wildlife Park closed. The city of Nashville took over ownership of the property in 1995 and began searching for an independent organization to manage the property. Meanwhile, the Nashville Zoo had opened as a separate, privately owned facility in Joelton, Tennessee, in May 1991. In June 1996, then-Nashville Mayor Phil Bredesen proposed that either the Nashville Zoo be relocated from its Joelton location to Grassmere, or Grassmere be converted to a city park without animals. In October 1996, the Nashville City Council approved the terms of a lease agreement for Nashville Zoo to relocate to Grassmere.

The Nashville Zoo remained open in Joelton. In May 1997, the Nashville Wildlife Park at Grassmere opened. Both the Zoo and the wildlife park remained open, but due to public confusion, the Zoo closed their Joelton site in October 1998 and focused completely on the Grassmere location.

== Conservation ==
In 2019, the Nashville Zoo supported nearly 50 conservation programs. These efforts include coral rescue, combatting wildlife trafficking, and preserving endangered or threatened species both locally and globally, including the hellbender, cheetah, loggerhead shrike, alligator snapping turtle, streamside salamander, oilbird, flamingo, and Nashville crayfish.

== Gallery ==
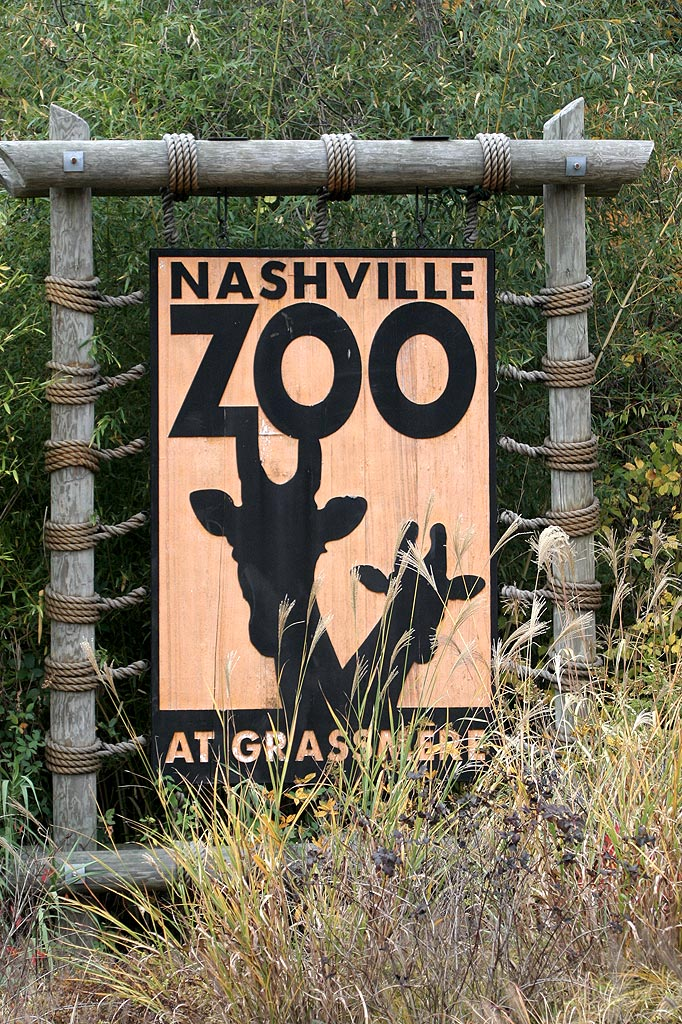
Entrance sign

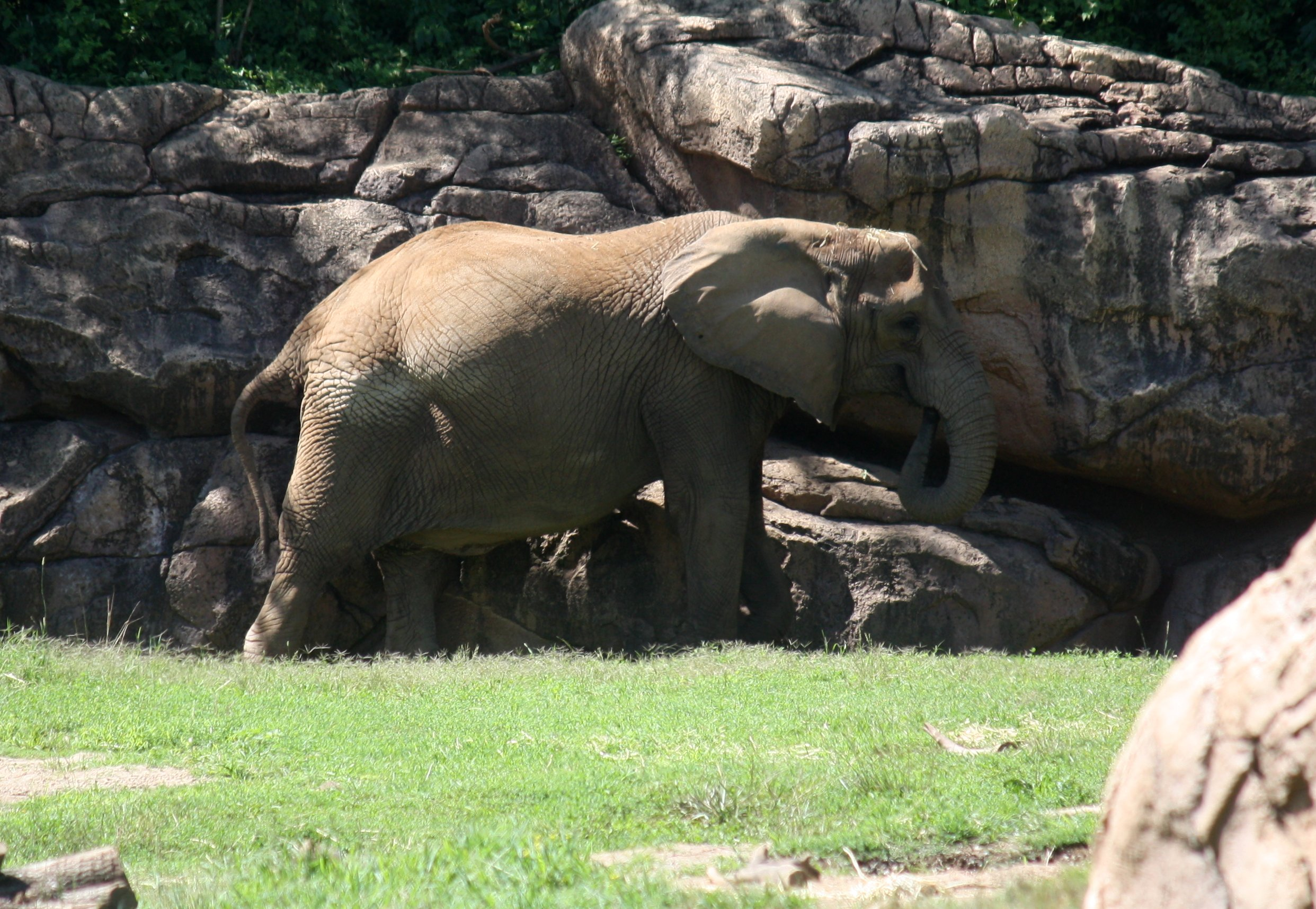
African bush elephant

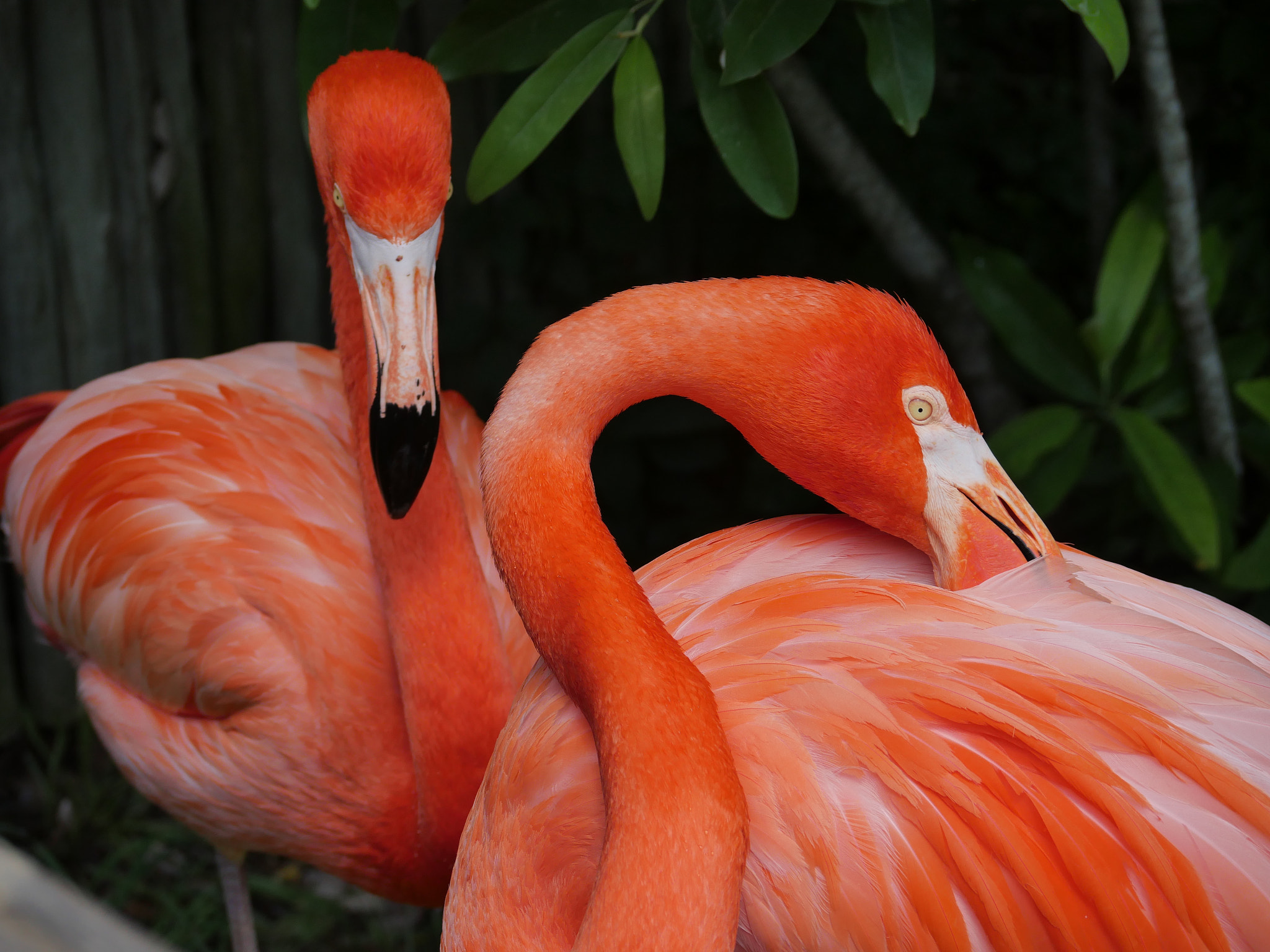
American flamingo (Phoenicopterus ruber)

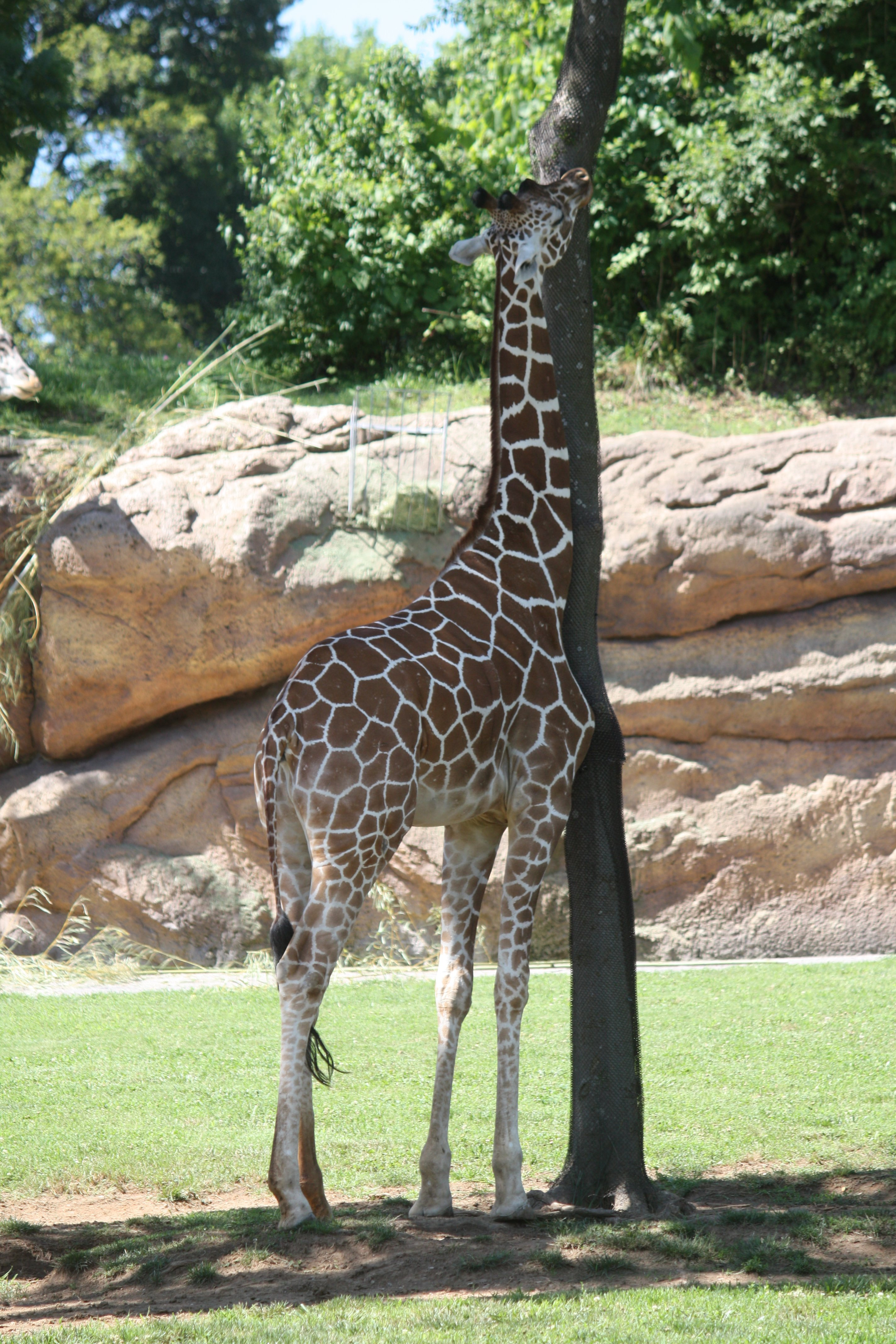
Reticulated giraffe

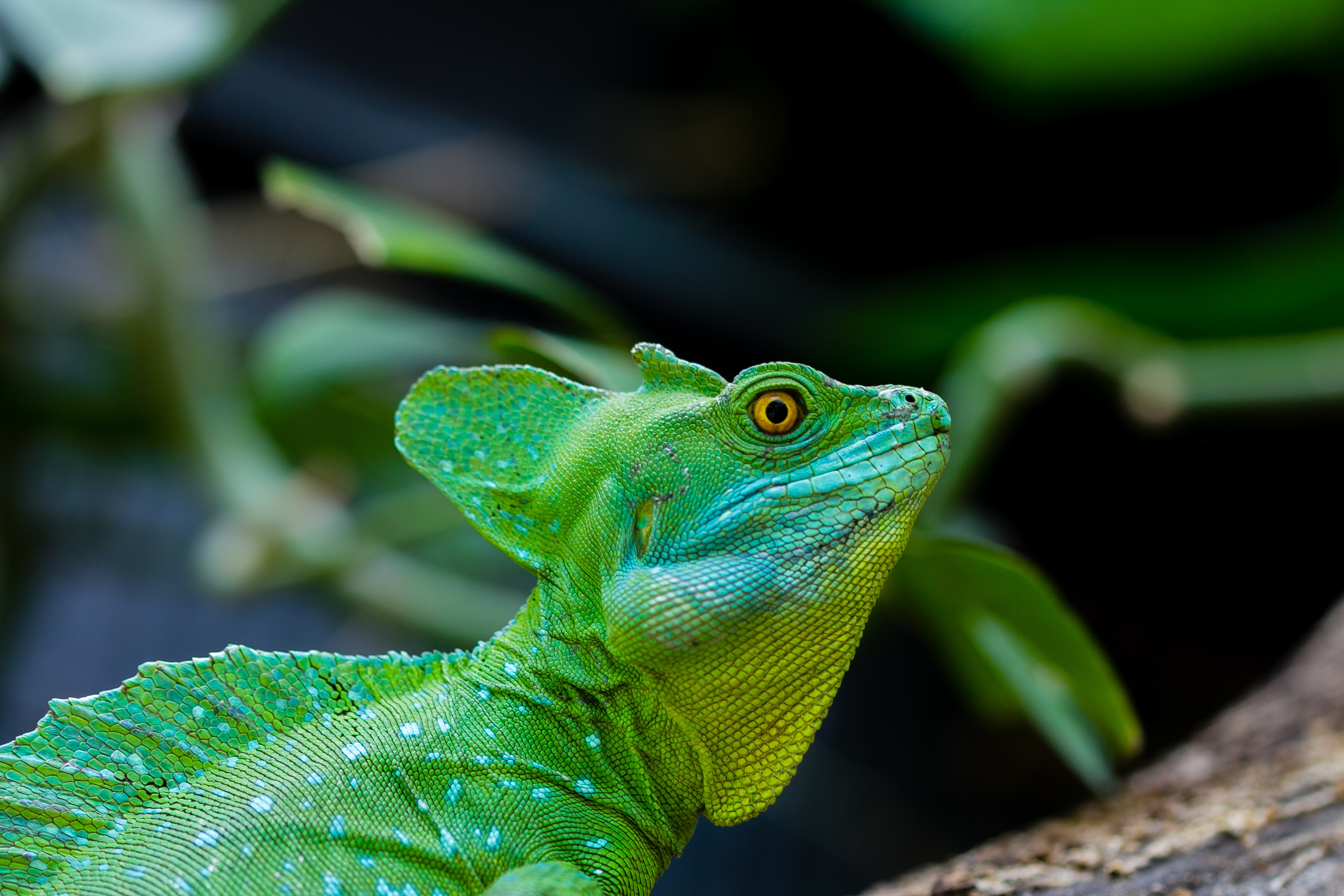
Plumed basilisk (Basiliscus plumifrons)

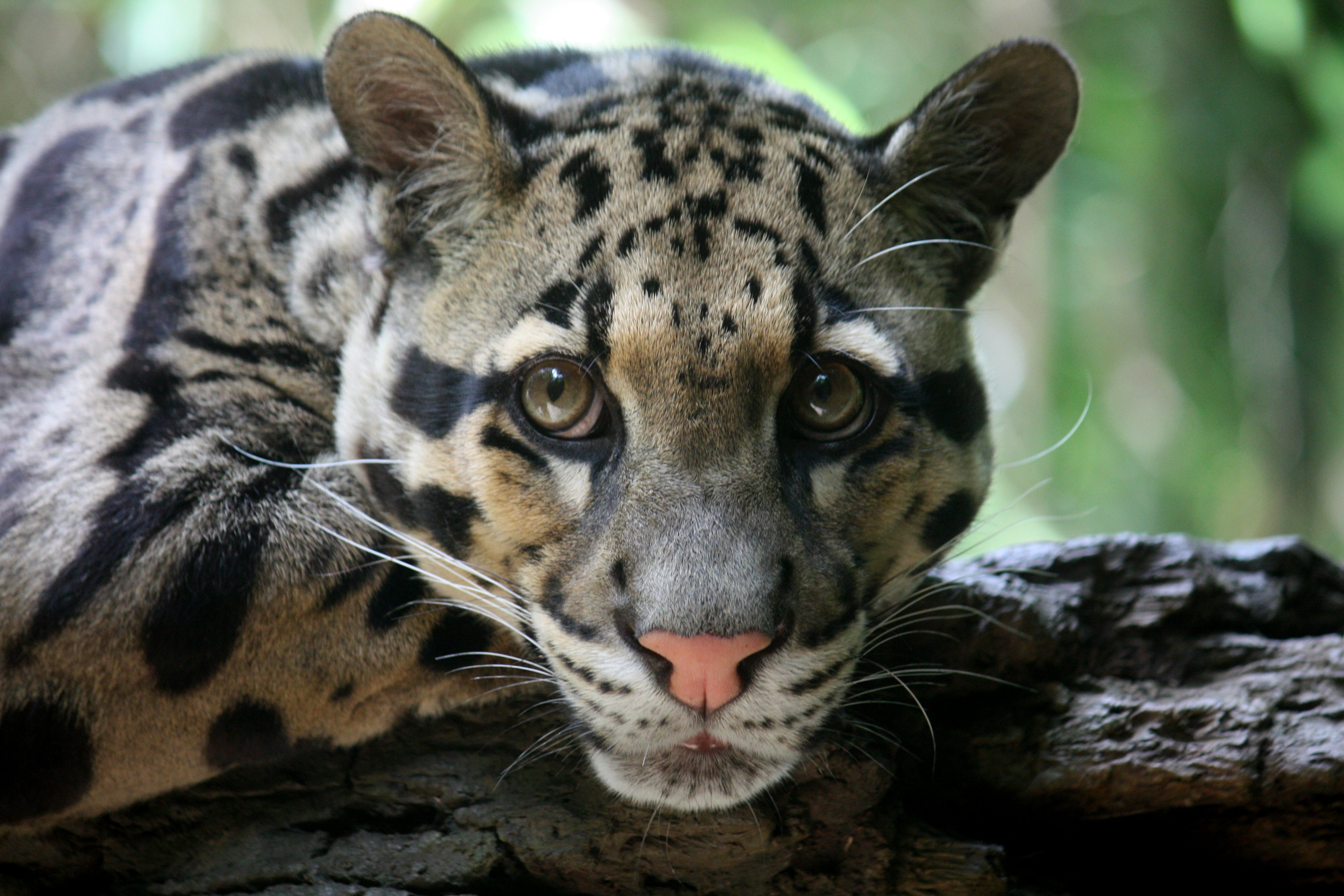
Clouded leopard (Neofelis nebulosa)

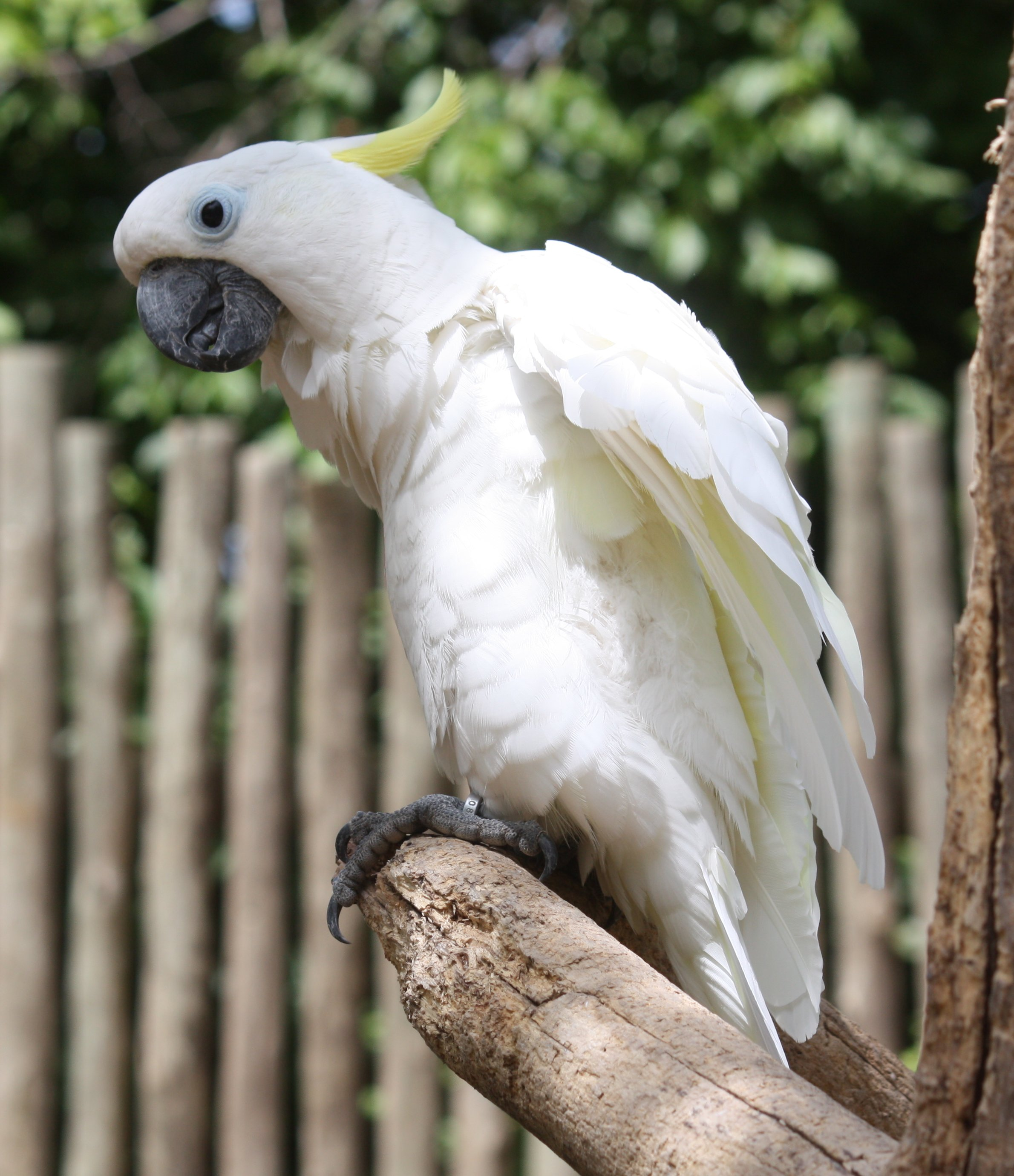
Cockatoo

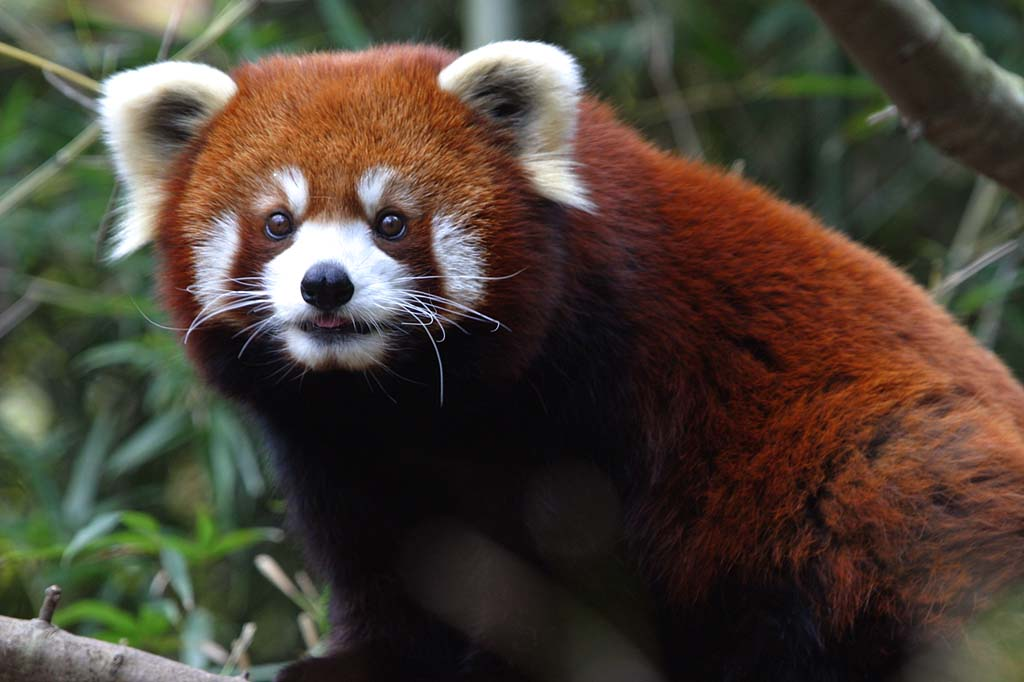
Red panda

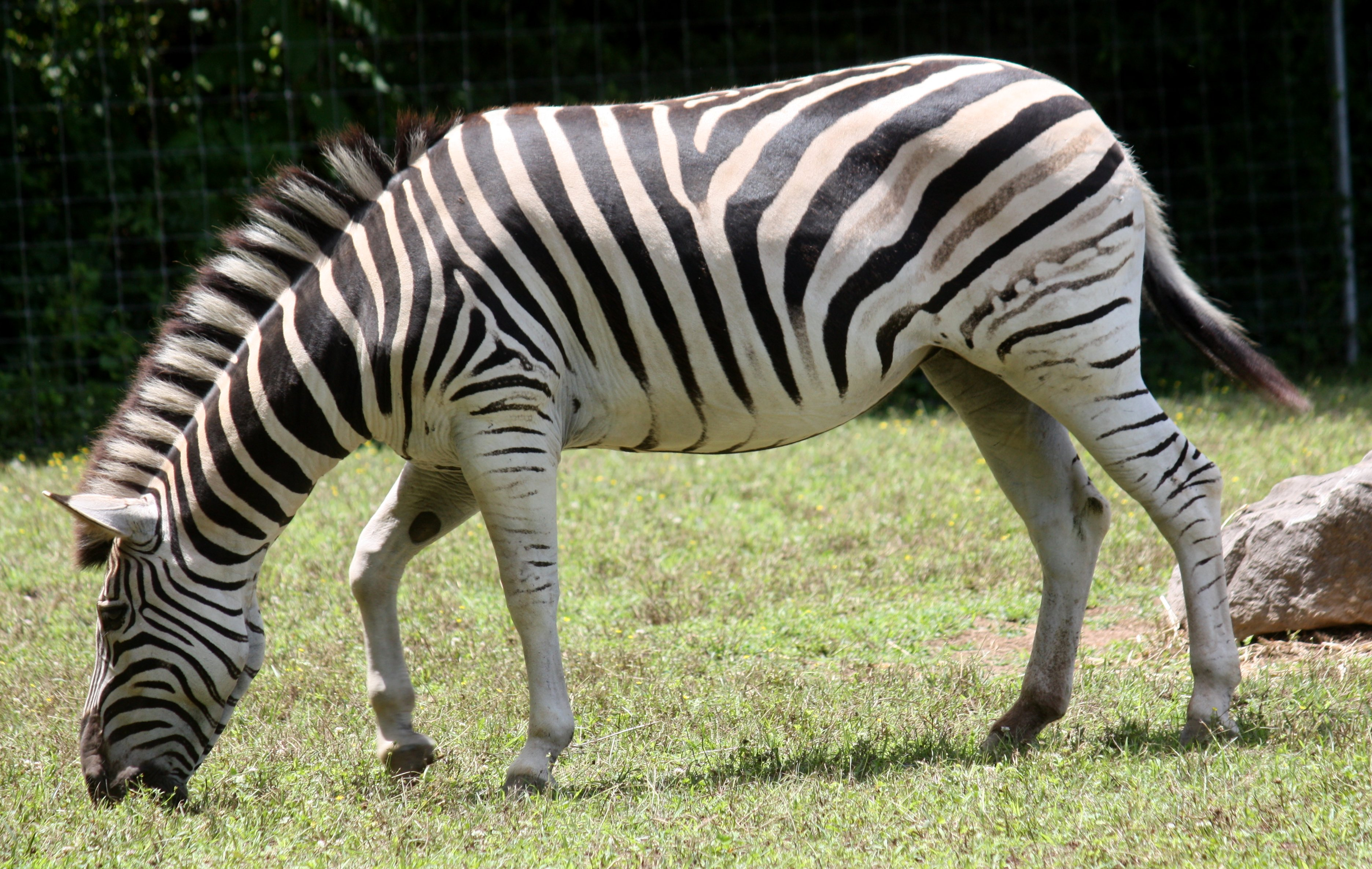
Plains zebra

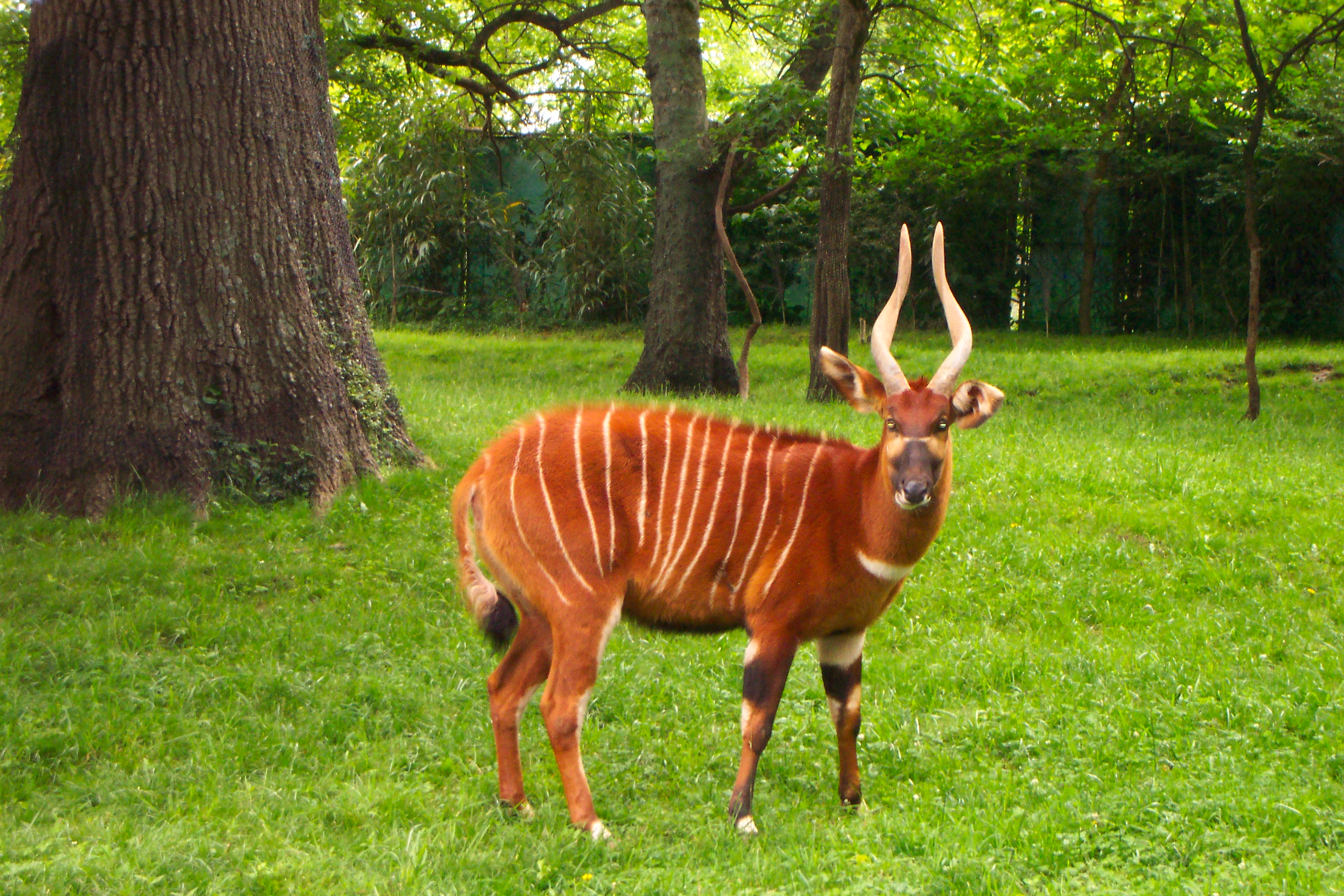
Bongo (Tragelaphus eurycerus)

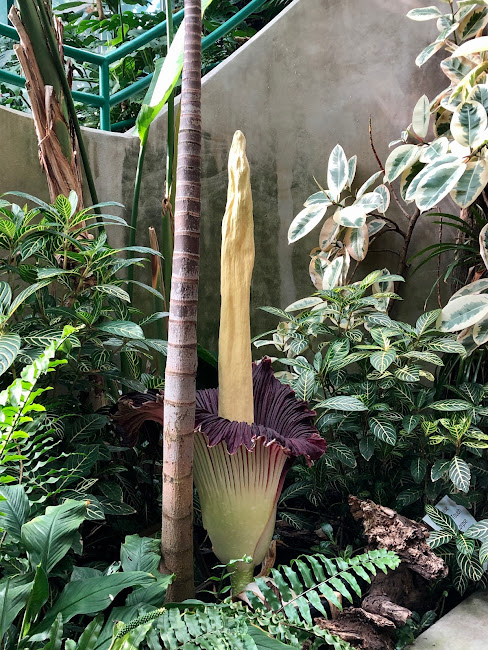
Titan arum
