= Louise Edwards (astronomer) =

Canadian astronomer

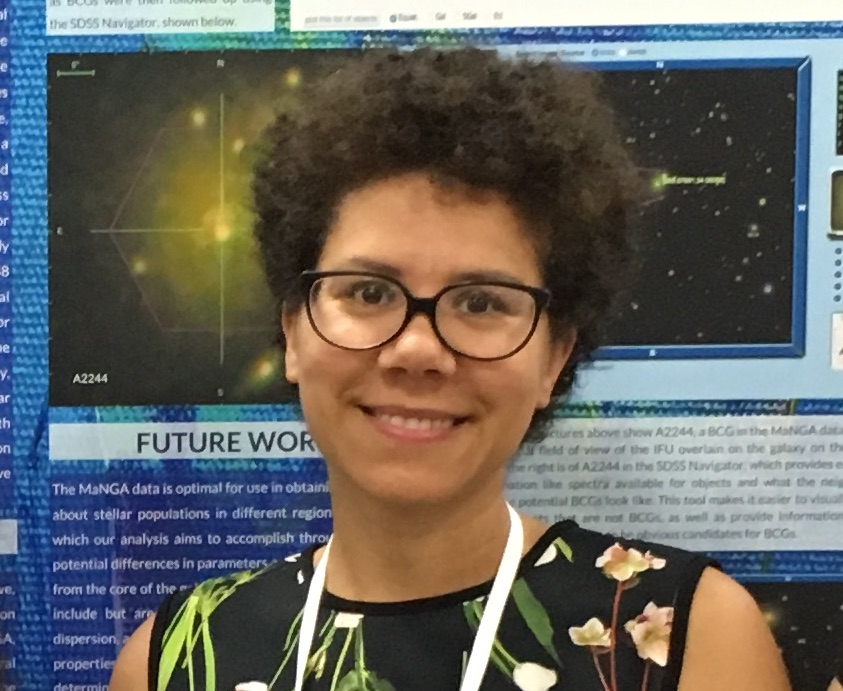
- Born: November 21, 1978 (age 47)
- Citizenship: Canada, Trinidad and Tobago
- Education: Université Laval
- Scientific career
- Fields: Astrophysics, Astronomy
- Workplaces: California Polytechnic State University

Louise Olivia Violet Edwards (born 21 November 1978) is a Canadian astronomer and associate professor of physics at California Polytechnic State University (Cal Poly), and is one of the first Black Canadians to receive a PhD in astronomy. In 2002, she was pictured on a Canadian stamp.

== Early life, education and research ==
Louise Edwards grew up in Victoria, British Columbia, Canada. She completed her undergraduate degree in physics and astronomy, with a minor in mathematics, at the University of Victoria. She received a master's degree from St Mary's University in 2003, and a PhD from Université Laval in 2007. She studies galaxy formation and evolution using optical and infrared spectroscopy, X-ray photometric data, and radio wavelength observations, focusing on Brightest Cluster Galaxies, galaxies in cluster cores, and galaxies in filaments.

== Career ==
Following her doctoral studies, Edwards was a postdoctoral research scientist at Caltech/IPAC and Trent University, and then an assistant professor at Mount Allison University. From 2012 to 2016, Edwards was a lecturer and research scientist in the astronomy department at Yale University, before starting her faculty position at Cal Poly in 2016. During her time at Yale, she was the chair of the Dorrit Hoffleit Undergraduate Research Fellowship program for undergraduate research in Astronomy.

== In the media ==
- CBC program celebrating Black History Month
- The Deep Sky: From Near to Far. Essays in the 2013–2020 editions of the RASC Observer's Handbook
- Astronomy at Yale (Yale Astronomy Department Documentary)
- This black hole has an appetite for cold, cosmic rain
- Astronomy in Color (interview)
- Research note: An illuminating look at large galaxies and their closest companions
- Leitner Family Observatory and Planetarium at Yale
- Blog Downtown LA
- Boomerang-shaped galaxy sighted
- Astronomers Probe "Sandbar" Between Islands of Galaxies
- International School for Young Astronomers
- Canadian Astronomical Society Newsletter I
