= Birds of North America (TV series) =

- Genre: Documentary
- Directed by: Rob Meyer
- Starring: Jason Ward; Jeffrey Ward; Molly Adams; Wyatt Cenac; J. Drew Lanham
- Country of origin: United States
- Original language: English
- No. of seasons: 1

Production
- Production company: Topic

Original release
- Network: YouTube
- Release: March 17, 2019

Birds of North America is an American documentary web series produced by Topic and distributed by YouTube. It is directed by Rob Meyer and hosted by naturalist and birdwatcher Jason Ward. The series, which regularly featured Jason's brother Jeffrey, was first announced on March 8, 2019, and the first episode aired on March 17, 2019. The series aimed to reach people who might not normally engage in conservation efforts and learn about natural history—in particular young people, people of color, and people who live in cities. People and projects featured in the series include: the American Museum of Natural History's collection manager Paul Sweet, veteran birder Pete Dunne, author and ecology professor Drew Lanham, New York City-based artist George Boorujy (author of the Audubon Mural Project), comedian Wyatt Cenac, and Molly Adams (founder of the Feminist Bird Club).

In February 2021, following allegations of sexual misconduct involving the host of the series, Topic removed the series from all their platforms.
