= DC Bird Alliance =

US National Audubon Society chapter

DC Bird Alliance, formerly the Audubon Society of the District of Columbia and known as DC Audubon Society, is a local chapter of the National Audubon Society. It was established in 1999.

Plans were announced to change the name of the organization in March 2023, and the new name was published in April 2024.

The organization's goal is to "build people-powered, bird-friendly communities in all eight wards of" the District of Columbia, with volunteers "committed to conservation, education, and advocacy".

It sponsors lectures, field trips and an annual winter bird count in the Chesapeake and Ohio Canal National Historical Park. DC Bird Alliance also works with area organizations on conservation programs, including restoring songbird habitat in Rock Creek Park.
