= Nicole Jackson (birder) =

American birder

Nicole Jackson is an American birder and environmental educator. She co-founded the first Black Birders Week in 2020, is a board member for the Columbus Audubon chapter, and is a former member of the National Parks Conservation Association's Next Generation Advisory Council. She has worked with Outdoor Afro, Aldo Leopold Foundation, and Children & Nature Network’s Natural Leaders Network cohort, and North American Association of Environmental Education.

== Life ==
She is from Cleveland, Ohio and spent time in foster care when she was young. She graduated with a bachelor's degree in Natural Resources at Ohio State University in 201 with a major in Parks, Recreation & Tourism and a focus on environmental education and interpretation. She was a Toyota TogetherGreen Youth Fellow.

She on the board of the Audubon of Columbus, Ohio where she works as an educator with urban youth. She created Black in National Parks Week. She worked at North American Association of Environmental Education as a CCC Fellow. She has previously worked as an educator and camp coordinator at Franklin Park Conservatory and Botanical Gardens. She is a former member of the National Parks Conservation Association's Next Generation Advisory Council, and has worked with Outdoor Afro, Aldo Leopold Foundation, and Children & Nature Network’s Natural Leaders Network cohort, and North American Association of Environmental Education.

She became interested in birds at Ohio State University when she started working on the Acadian flycatchers and northern cardinals with her advisor Amanda Rodewald.
