= Racially motivated emergency call =

Fraudulent emergency calls which are motivated by racism

Racially motivated emergency calls are fraudulent emergency calls motivated by racism. According to Alivia Zubron at the University of Northern Iowa, the consequences of emergency calls to police are often overlooked; additionally, risk-averse callers may be motivated by the sense of control that emergency calls bring to a situation. As a result, racists may attempt to rationalize emergency calls against targets based on perceived factors other than race. A study by Jameesha Rock at Florida Atlantic University found that police officers who respond to racially motivated emergency calls tend to mediate the dispute by affirming that the crime did not happen.

== Instances ==
=== United States ===
In the United States, African Americans are more likely to be perceived as violent or criminally suspicious because of their race. As a result, white people have been known to call 9-1-1 on black people.

In March 2018, William Colbert had the police called on him after a dispute over a refund. The caller alleged that he was armed, and when the police arrived to the scene one of them assaulted Colbert until he lay bleeding.

In April 2018, an employee at a Starbucks location in Philadelphia called police on two black customers who hadn't ordered anything because they were waiting for a business meeting. After they were arrested for trespassing, it was determined that there was no evidence that a crime was taking place. After the incident sparked protests and garnered international attention, Starbucks temporarily closed over 8,000 U.S. locations to provide racial bias training to its employees.

Also in April, five black women had the police called on them at Grandview Golf Club for not playing their game of golf fast enough.

Various incidents in 2019 garnered national coverage and went viral on social media under hashtags such as #BBQBecky.

Alison Ettel, the CEO of TreatWell Health, was recorded calling the police after observing an 8-year-old black girl selling water. Ettel claimed to have called the police to inquire about the legality of selling water without a permit. The internet deemed her "Permit Patty".

In October 2018 in New York City, Teresa Klein pretended to call the police on a black 9-year-old boy, alleging she had been groped. Security camera footage revealed that the child's backpack had brushed against her back, and two days later while in the bodega she apologized to the boy after being confronted with the recording. She became known as "Cornerstore Caroline."

In May 2020 in New York City, Amy Cooper, a white woman, called police on black birdwatcher Christian Cooper (no relation) after he asked her to put her dog on a leash. Amy was criminally charged after it was determined that Christian had not threatened her, as she had claimed.

==== Legislation ====
In June 2019, the state of Oregon passed a bill that would allow victims of discrimatory 911 calls to sue the caller for up to $250. In the wake of the Amy Cooper incident, the state of New York made racially motivated 911 callers liable for injunctive relief and damages caused by their call. In September 2020, New Jersey made it a crime to make discriminatory 911 calls. In October 2020, San Francisco unanimously passed the CAREN Act, an ordinance that bans false 911 calls motivated by racism or other forms of discrimination. California state senator Rob Bonta simultaneously introduced similar legislation at the state level to make racist 911 calls a hate crime.

== See also ==
- CAREN Act
- Swatting
- Racial profiling
