= Jason Ward (naturalist) =

American naturalist, birder, and activist

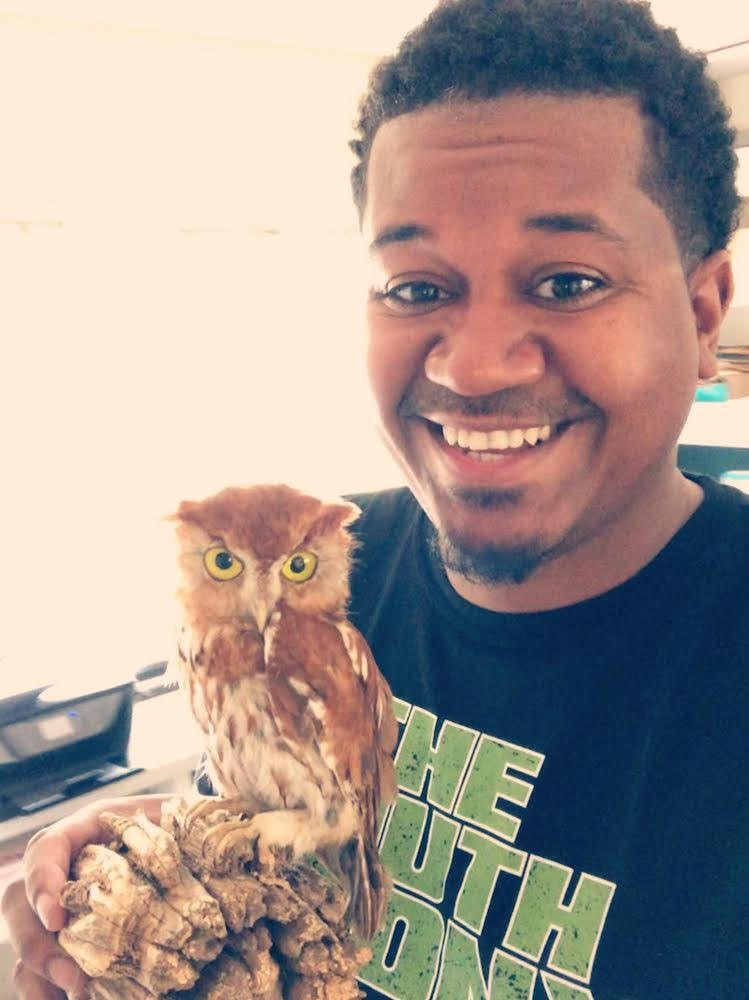
- Ward with an eastern screech-owl
- Born: Bronx, New York
- Television: Birds of North America

Jason Ward is an American naturalist, birder, and activist. He hosted the 2019 television documentary series Birds of North America, and is the co-founder and former CEO of "The BlackAFinSTEM Collective".

== Early life ==
Ward was born and raised in Bronx, New York. He has five siblings. He described seeing a peregrine falcon eating a pigeon when he was 14, which was one of the events that raised his interest in birds. He later moved to Atlanta and worked in a mortgage job. There he learned about the Atlanta Audubon Society, and started joining their bird walks. Eight months later he started leading these bird walks. He also worked at Zoo Atlanta as an education instructor. He was a community relations and outreach coordinator for the National Audubon Society until January 2020.

== Outreach work ==
Ward started a bird identification game on Twitter called #TrickyBirdID. He tweets out pictures of birds and participants have to guess what species it is. After the reveal he explains how to identify the bird.

Through this Twitter game he caught the attention of Anna Holmes, who worked as an editorial director for Topic.com. This led to the series Birds of North America, produced by Topic, of which the first episode was released on March 17, 2019. The show regularly features Ward's brother, Jeffrey, who is also a birder. The documentary series aims to reach people who might not normally engage in conservation efforts and learn about natural history—in particular young people, people of color, and people who live in cities. Ward also aims to share birding as a therapeutic activity for people living in cities.

In May 2020, Ward and other naturalists and science communicators founded the BlackAFinSTEM collective and participated in Black Birders Week— a series of online events to celebrate black scientists, scholars, and naturalists.

== Sexual assault allegations ==
In February 2021, Ward was fired from the American Bird Conservancy amid allegations of sexual assault. Topic.com, the streaming platform that produces The Birds of North America, promptly removed the series from all their platforms. Swarovski Optik removed images and posts from their social media platforms and put their cooperation with Ward "on hold". Other organizations also severed ties with Ward in light of these allegations, including the BlackAFinSTEM collective (which he co-founded), Georgia Audubon (where he volunteered as a field trip leader). Atlas Obscura and the American Birding Association, which featured Ward on their websites and podcasts, began reviewing, editing, and removing that content. Nissan announced they removed the video of a commercial featuring Ward. The National Audubon Society, an organization where Ward worked until January 2020, also published a statement ending any future relationship with him.

== Awards ==
- 2019 – Alongside Wildlife Foundation Outreach Award, rescinded in February 2021 following sexual assault allegations
- 2020 – Listed as one of Grist 50 also rescinded
