= Black Birders Week =

Campaign for diversity in birding, conservation, and the natural sciences

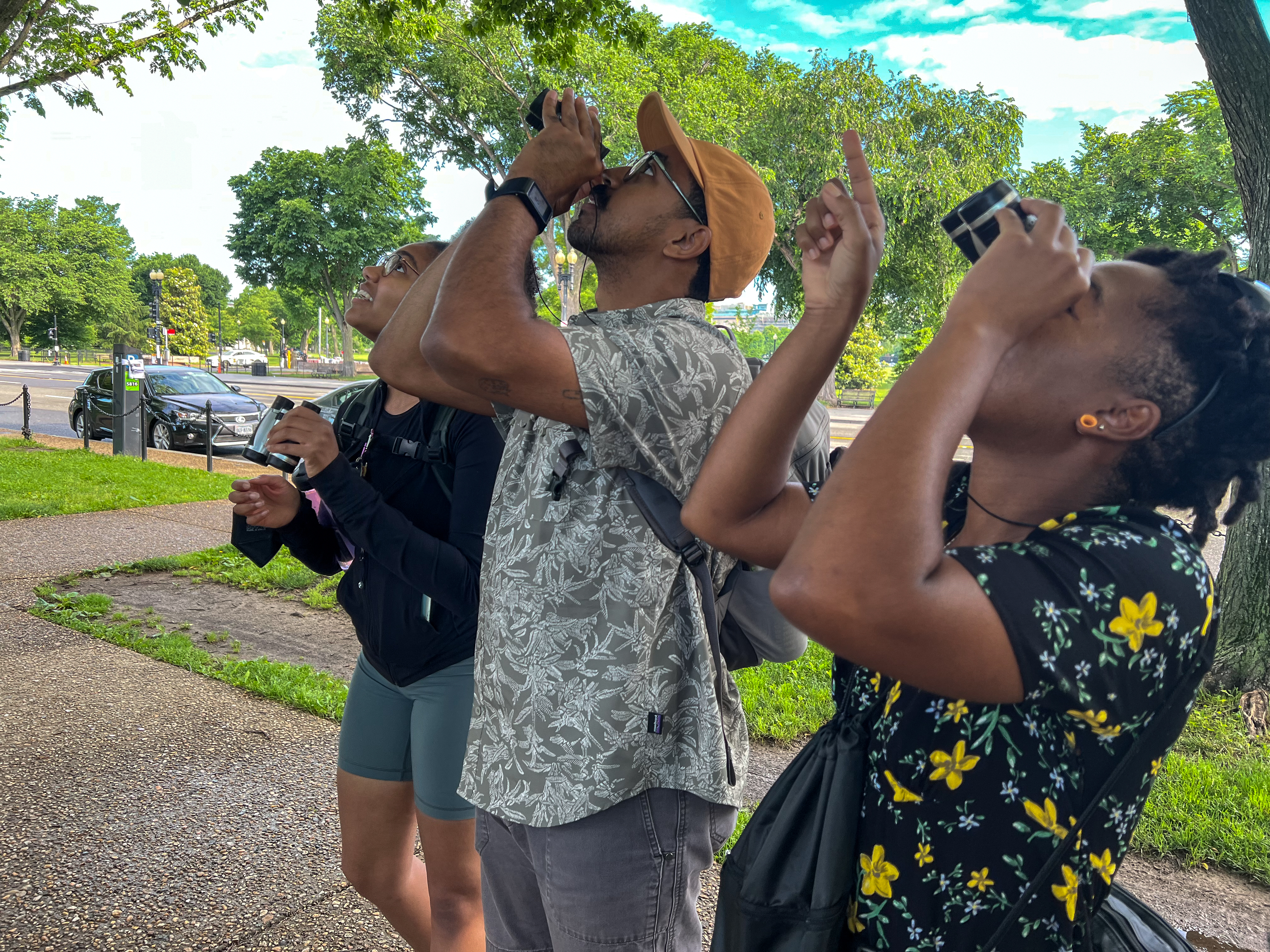
- Type: Environmental
- Significance: Increase the visibility of Black birders
- Ends: First week of June
- Date: Last week of May
- Duration: 1 week
- Frequency: Annual

Black Birders Week is an annual, week-long series of online events to highlight black nature enthusiasts and to increase the visibility of black birders, who face unique challenges and dangers when they are engaged in outdoor activities. The event was created as a response to the Central Park birdwatching incident and police brutality against Black Americans. The inaugural event ran from May 31 to 5 June 2020. The week of events was organized by a group of STEM professionals and students known as the BlackAFinSTEM Collective.

== Origin ==
Black Birders Week was announced on Twitter on May 29, 2020. The initiative was prompted in part by the murders of African Americans such as Ahmaud Arbery, Breonna Taylor, and George Floyd, and by the Central Park birdwatching incident in which a white dog walker called the police over the actions of a black birder who she considered to be "threatening" her. According to co-founder Anna Gifty Opoku-Agyeman, the goal of the initiative is "normalizing the fact that Black people exist in the birding and natural sciences community". Black people have historically been excluded from academic and professional spaces and lack visibility and representation in the natural sciences community and among birders in particular.

The week-long event was conceived and organized by members of a group of science, technology, engineering, and mathematics (STEM) professionals and students known as BlackAFinSTEM collective. In addition to Opoku-Agyeman, other co-founders include Jason Ward, Sheridan Alford, Danielle Belleny, Chelsea Connor, Joseph Saunders, Kassandra Ford, Armand Cann, Nicole Jackson, Corina Newsome and Tykee James.

== History ==
The first event series ran in 2020 from May 31 to June 5 using the #BlackBirdersWeek hashtag on Twitter and Instagram. Through these events and others, the series highlighted research carried out by Black birders, the happiness they find in nature, the racism experienced, and the importance of inclusivity in the outdoors. Furthermore, the series drew attention to several Black birders and naturalists, including Birds of North America's host Jason Ward, wildlife biologist J. Drew Lanham, wildlife conservationist Corina Newsome, National Audubon Society's government affairs coordinator Tykee James, and herpetologist Earyn McGee. The series was endorsed and promoted by advocacy groups, conservation organizations, and government agencies including: the National Audubon Society, the American Birding Association, the American Bird Conservancy, the US National Park Service, and the Ecological Society of America. Additionally, it garnered attention from various science and mainstream media outlets.

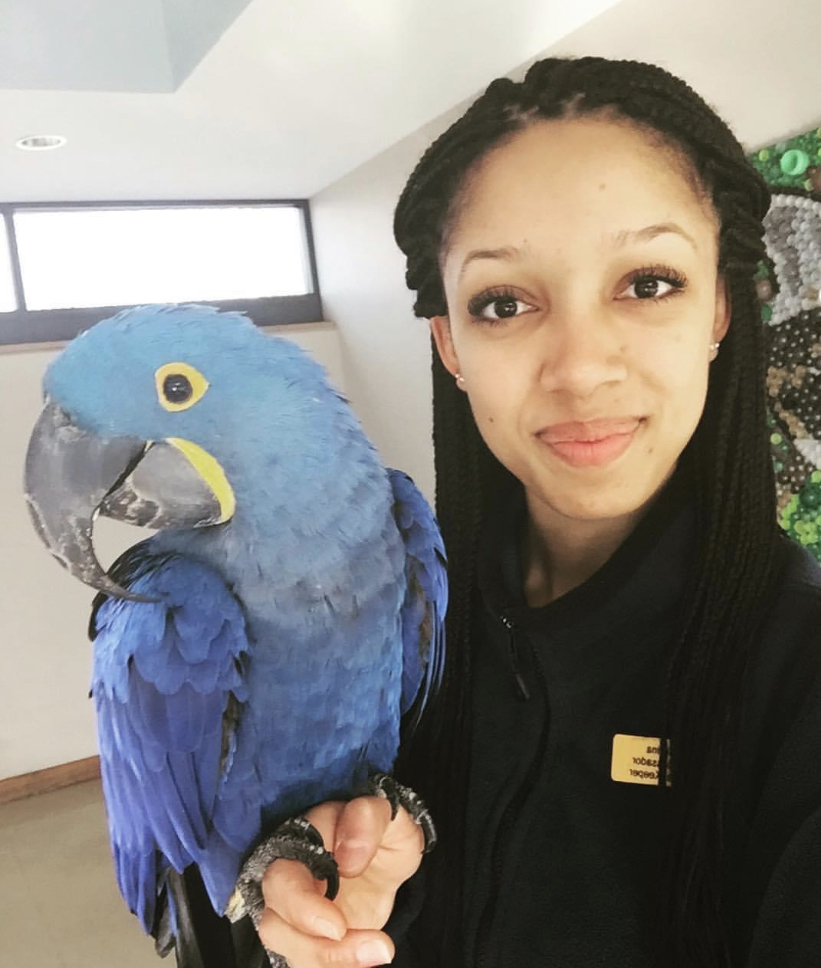
Co-organizer Corina Newsome with Tony, a hyacinth macaw, in 2017

In 2021, the week was continued.

In 2022, Black Birders Week was continued. The Smithsonian Institution hosted several programs to support the week's effort to increase representation in bird watching communities. The National Museum of Natural History hosted a panel with Chelsea Connor, Lynette Strickland and Amelia-Juliette Demery with opening remarks by Dara M. Wilson.

Both institutions continued holding Black Birders Week events in 2023. In New Hampshire, for example, the event continued previous years' focuses on nature awareness, accessibility, and equity. Events continued in 2024.

== Response ==
In response to the 2020 series, the National Wildlife Federation planned to dedicate part of their Conservation Fellowship and Intern Programs to young biologists of color. The organisers intend to continue the series in future years. The event also inspired other similar week-long events celebrating Black people in various STEM fields, #BlackInAstro week, #BlackBotanistsWeek, #BlackInNeuro, and #BlackInChem.
