= Christian Cooper =

American writer (born 1963)

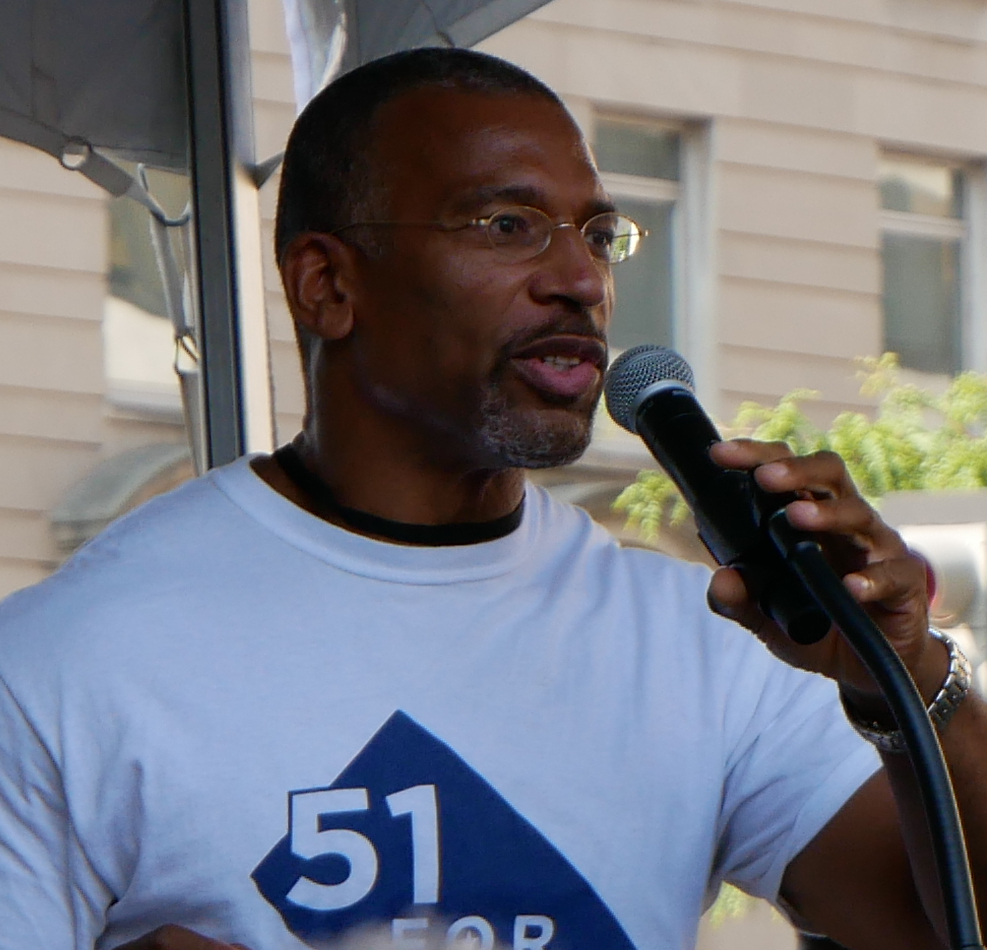
- Cooper in 2021
- Born: 1963 (age 62–63)
- Areas: Television host, writer, editor
- Pseudonym: C F Cooper
- Notable works: Songs of the Metamythos

Christian Cooper (born 1963) is an American television host, writer and editor. He hosted National Geographic's Extraordinary Birder with Christian Cooper, for which he won a Daytime Emmy Award for Outstanding Daytime Personality – Non-Daily in 2024.

Cooper first gained cultural notoriety in 2020 after a false police report was made by a white dogwalker who went viral for her erratic behavior while calling the police on him birdwatching in New York City's Central Park, known as the Central Park birdwatching incident.

He has since written a memoir, Better Living Through Birding: Notes from a Black Man in the Natural World, which was published by Random House in 2023.

== Career ==
Cooper is based in New York City, and is currently a senior biomedical editor at Health Science Communications.

In 2023, Random House published his memoir, Better Living Through Birding: Notes from a Black Man in the Natural World.

Cooper has become a frequent substitute co-host for the public-access television news program Gay USA. On May 16, 2022, it was announced that he would host a National Geographic TV show called Extraordinary Birder with Christian Cooper, exploring the world of birds alongside experts in the field. The show premiered on June 17, 2023.

On June 8, 2024, Cooper won a Daytime Emmy Award in the Outstanding Daytime Personality category for his work on Extraordinary Birder.

=== Comics ===
Cooper was one of the first openly gay editors at Marvel; colleague and friend Kelly Corvese was the first. He introduced the first gay male character in Star Trek, Yoshi Mishima, in the Starfleet Academy series, which was nominated for a GLAAD Media Award in 1999. He also introduced the first openly lesbian character for Marvel, Victoria Montesi and created and authored Queer Nation: The Online Gay Comic. Cooper was also an associate editor for Alpha Flight #106 in which the character Northstar came out as gay.

Cooper has written stories for Marvel Comics Presents, which often feature characters such as Ghost Rider and Vengeance. He has also edited a number of X-Men collections, and the final two issues of the Marvel Swimsuit Special.

== Personal life ==
Born in 1963 to parents who were both teachers, Cooper found his interest in birds while reading a birdwatching book during a roadtrip from his Long Island childhood home to California. He graduated from Uniondale High School and later graduated from Harvard University. In the 1980s, he was president of the Harvard Ornithological Club, and is currently on the board of directors for NYC Bird Alliance. Cooper has a long history of LGBT activism including being the co-chair of the board of directors of GLAAD in the 1980s.

On May 25, 2020, Cooper was involved in a confrontation with a dog walker in Central Park, with the woman calling the police over a disagreement on whether her dog should be leashed in the area, characterising Cooper's behavior as "threatening". The incident led to the creation of Black Birders Week, and is the basis for Cooper's online comic book about racism, illustrated by Alitha Martinez and published by DC Comics, called It's a Bird.

== Bibliography ==
- Marvel Comics Presents:
  - "Return of the Braineaters" (featuring Ghost Rider and Werewolf by Night, with pencils by John Stanisci and inks by Jimmy Palmiotti, in Marvel Comics Presents #107–112, Marvel Comics, 1992)
  - "Siege of Darkness" (featuring Ghost Rider, with pencils by Reggie Jones and inks by Fred Harper, in Marvel Comics Presents #144–146, Marvel Comics, 1993–1994)
  - "Tower of Blood" (featuring Vengeance, with pencils by Reggie Jones and inks by Fred Harper, in Marvel Comics Presents #147–148, Marvel Comics, 1994)
  - "The Price" (featuring Vengeance, with Fred Harper, in Marvel Comics Presents #149, Marvel Comics, 1994)
  - "Dangerous Games" (featuring Vengeance, with pencils by Reggie Jones and inks by Fred Harper, in Marvel Comics Presents #152–153, Marvel Comics, 1994)
  - "Altered Spirits" (featuring Vengeance, with pencils by Reggie Jones and inks by Fred Harper, in Marvel Comics Presents #156–157, Marvel Comics, 1994)
  - "Final Gambit" (featuring Vengeance, with pencils by Reggie Jones and inks by Fred Harper, in Marvel Comics Presents #175, Marvel Comics, 1995)
- Darkhold #1–16 (with Richard Case, Marvel Comics, 1992–1994)
- Excalibur #77–81 (Marvel Comics, 1994)
- Star Trek: Starfleet Academy #1–19 (with pencils by Chris Renaud and inks by Andy Lanning, Marvel Comics, 1996–1998)
- Songs of the Metamythos (as C. F. Cooper)
- "It's a Bird" (with Alitha E. Martinez, Mark Morales, Emilio Lopez, and Rob Clark Jr., DC Comics, 2020)
- Better Living Through Birding: Notes from a Black Man in the Natural World. New York: Random House. June 13, 2023. ISBN 9780593242384. OCLC 1346618419.
