= Central Park birdwatching incident =

2020 confrontation in New York City, US

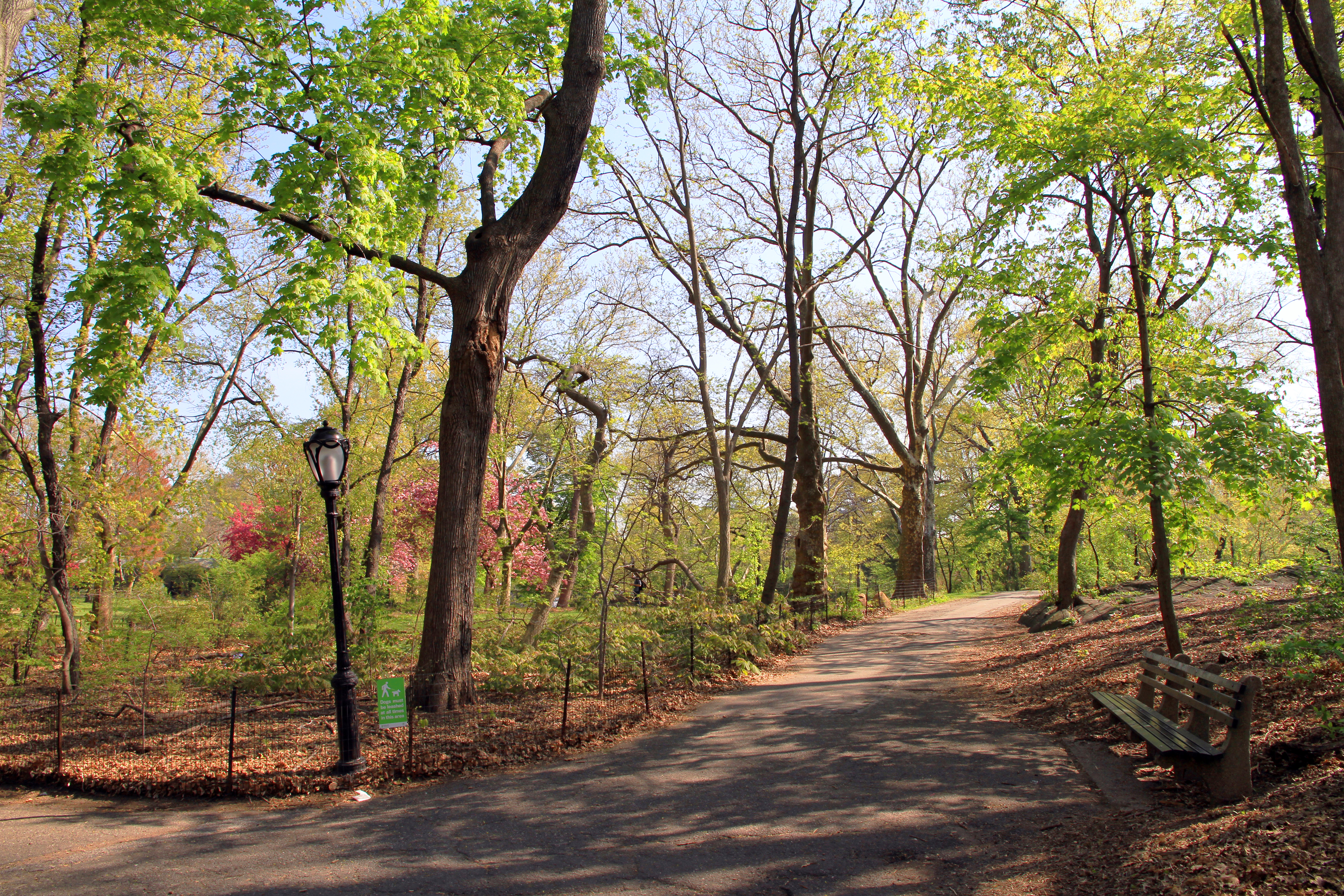
- The Ramble where the encounter between Amy Cooper and Christian Cooper occurred
- Date: May 25, 2020
- Location: Central Park, New York City
- Filmed by: Christian Cooper
- Participants: Amy Cooper; Christian Cooper
- Charges: Amy Cooper: filing a false police report (dismissed Feb 2021)

On May 25, 2020, a confrontation occurred between Christian Cooper, a black birdwatcher, and Amy Cooper (no relation), a white dogwalker from Canada, in a section of New York City's Central Park known as the Ramble.

Amy's dog was unleashed in the Ramble, an area where leashing is required for the safety of the wildlife; she allegedly declined Christian's request that she leash her dog. Christian Cooper then told Amy Cooper if she was going to do what she likes, he would do what he likes and she would not like it. He then called the dog. When Amy Cooper said the dog would not come to him, he beckoned the dog toward him with a dog treat, Amy yelled "Don't you touch my dog!". Christian then recorded Amy, who called 9-1-1 and said, "There is an African American man—I am in Central Park—he is recording me and threatening myself and my dog. Please, send the cops immediately!" By the time New York City Police Department officers responded, both parties had left.

The incident happened the same day as the arrest and murder of George Floyd in Minneapolis. Both incidents gained nearly instant media coverage due to video recordings being shared across social media. The month after, the New York State Legislature passed a law classifying false police reports against protected groups of people—including race, gender, and religion—as a hate crime.

Shortly after the incident, Amy's employer, investment firm Franklin Templeton, fired her and said in a statement that they "do not tolerate racism of any kind". Her suit against them for wrongful termination, in which she claimed they "caused her such severe emotional distress that she was suicidal," was dismissed. On July 6, 2020, the Manhattan District Attorney announced that Amy Cooper had been charged with filing a false police report, a misdemeanor with a penalty of up to one year in jail. The charges against her were dropped in February 2021 after she completed an educational course on racial identity. Amy left the United States and returned to her native Canada, citing doxing and death threats as among the reasons for doing so.

Christian cautioned against focusing on one individual and emphasized the wider problem of institutional racism in the United States. He wrote about the incident, his experiences birding, and the activity in general in his book Better Living Through Birding: Notes from a Black Man in the Natural World. In an effort to make the birdwatching community more inclusive, he also hosted a National Geographic TV show Extraordinary Birder with Christian Cooper, for which he won a Daytime Emmy Award in 2024.

== Incident ==
On the morning of May 25, 2020, portfolio manager Amy Cooper was walking her dog in an area of New York City's Central Park known as the Ramble. Comic book writer and editor Christian Cooper was birdwatching there and noticed that Amy's dog was unleashed and running free, despite the requirement that dogs in that part of the park be on leash set by the Central Park Conservancy, which manages the park under contract with the city. Christian asked Amy to leash her dog, which by all accounts she declined to do. By his own account, Christian then said: "Look, if you're going to do what you want, I'm going to do what I want, but you're not going to like it," and beckoned the dog toward him with a dog treat. Amy then yelled: "Don't you touch my dog!" Christian later explained that he regularly encounters dog owners who refuse to leash their dogs in leash-only areas, which both harms birds and is disruptive to birders like himself. This led him to carry dog treats to offer to off-leash dogs, since he has found that dog owners tend to distrust strangers and will leash their dogs to prevent them from taking the treat. Amy grew upset and threatened to call the police, leading Christian to begin recording on his cellphone.

External videos
- Video recorded by Christian Cooper on Twitter (archived at the Wayback Machine)

Christian Cooper's video begins with Amy Cooper approaching him asking him to stop recording and pointing her finger in his face. He says to her: "Please, don't come close to me." She then says: "I'm calling the cops ... I'm gonna tell them there's an African American man threatening my life." She pulls out her phone, calls the police and, when connected to the 9-1-1 operator, tells the operator that "There is an African American man—I am in Central Park—he is recording me and threatening myself and my dog. Please, send the cops immediately!" The video ends with Christian telling her "thank you" the moment she leashes the dog. Some time after the initial call, a 9-1-1 dispatcher called Amy back, and in this second call, Amy claimed that Christian tried to assault her. Police said that by the time they responded, both individuals had left.

== Reaction ==
Christian Cooper's sister posted the video on her Twitter account, while Christian posted the video to his own Facebook page. The Twitter video alone received over 40 million views. Amy Cooper's actions in the video were widely criticized. She was accused of falsely presenting herself as being in immediate physical danger, in the context of the "tendency for people and police to treat Black people with suspicion". The video also showed Amy dragging her dog, a Cocker Spaniel, by his collar. On May 25, she surrendered the dog to the shelter from which she had adopted him two years before. On June 3, after an evaluation by the shelter's veterinarian, the dog was returned to her.

After viewing the video that day, Amy's employer, Franklin Templeton, placed her on administrative leave, pending an investigation. The following day, the company fired her from her job as head of the firm's insurance investments. In a statement, the company said that "...we have made the decision to terminate the employee involved, effective immediately. We do not tolerate racism of any kind at Franklin Templeton."

In a Facebook commentary four days after the incident, television host Trevor Noah said that the confrontation between the two Coopers was an example of how White and Black Americans see, and are seen by, the police differently. He said that this event being captured on video meant that viewers could perceive Amy Cooper's actions as deliberate, and verifying the police's unequal treatment of people of different races. Julia Carrie Wong of The Guardian wrote, "It was through that performance that Amy Cooper took on the mantle of an American archetype: the white woman who weaponizes her vulnerability to exact violence upon a Black man".

The August 3, 2021, episode of the podcast Honestly with Bari Weiss—titled The Real Story of "The Central Park Karen"—described the incident and suggested that the original media reports were biased against Amy Cooper. Amy released her own op-ed in Newsweek on November 7, 2023, detailing her version of the event and the resulting long-term damage. In both the podcast and op-ed, Amy claimed that Christian's actions had made her feel threatened and afraid for her dog: "I don't know that as a woman alone in a park that I had another option [other than calling 9-1-1]", and that her repeated description of Christian as African-American was due to the dispatcher being unable to hear her over the poor phone signal in the park. She also claimed she had received death threats and was doxxed, causing her to feel suicidal and to leave the United States.

Penguin Random House published Christian's book Better Living Through Birding: Notes from a Black Man in the Natural World in June 2023. That month, National Geographic TV released the show Extraordinary Birder with Christian Cooper, which focused on encouraging more diverse groups of people to birdwatch.

=== Legislation ===
In 2018, New York State Assembly member Félix W. Ortiz first proposed legislation that would consider falsely reporting criminal incidents against protected groups of people—including race, gender, and religion—to be a hate crime. Violators could face prison time "if the motivation for reporting such crime is motivated by a perception or belief about their race, color, national origin, ancestry, gender, religion, religious practice, age, disability or sexual orientation." In the wake of the Central Park incident, the bill was re-introduced in May 2020 by Ortiz with four co-sponsors in the Assembly and by Senator Brian Benjamin in the New York State Senate. Governor Andrew Cuomo subsequently supported it as part of a set of other proposals related to police reform for the 2020 New York legislative session, and he signed it into law in June 2020.

== Legal proceedings ==
During the week of the incident, the New York City Commission on Human Rights launched an investigation of the interaction and sent a letter to Amy Cooper requesting her cooperation. The commission has the power to fine violators of the law, award financial damages to victims, order training on the New York City Human Rights Law, and order community service. The Central Park Civic Association also asked New York City Mayor Bill de Blasio to ban her from the park.

On July 6, 2020, the Manhattan District Attorney (DA), Cyrus Vance Jr., announced that Amy had been issued a desk appearance ticket (an order to appear in New York City Criminal Court) and charged with filing a false police report, a misdemeanor with a maximum penalty of up to one year in jail; lesser sentences could include community service or counseling. She was scheduled for arraignment on October 14. The Manhattan DA said in a statement that they were "strongly committed to holding perpetrators of this conduct accountable". Christian Cooper declined to cooperate with the Manhattan DA's investigation as he felt "[b]ringing her more misery just seems like piling on". In a Washington Post op-ed, he expressed ambivalence about prosecuting Amy: "I think it's a mistake to focus on this one individual. The important thing the incident highlights is the long-standing, deep-seated racial bias against us black and brown folk that permeates the United States".

During the arraignment, the New York County District Attorney's prosecutors revealed a second call made by a 9-1-1 dispatcher who called Amy back. This was the first time the existence of the second 9-1-1 call had been made public. Initial news reporting stated that Amy had made a second 9-1-1 call against Christian, in which she alleged that Christian had tried to assault her. The New York Times later made a correction, saying that the second call was when a 9-1-1 dispatcher called her back. In February 2021, charges against Amy were dropped after she completed a five-session educational and therapeutic program focused on racial identity.

On May 25, 2021, Amy sued Franklin Templeton for wrongful termination. She claimed that the firing had violated several anti-discrimination and defamation laws. Amy's lawsuit characterized Christian as "a birdwatcher with a history of aggressively confronting dog owners in Central Park who walked their dogs without a leash. It was Christian Cooper's practice and intent to cause dog owners to be fearful for their safety and the safety of their dogs". Franklin Templeton said: "We believe ... the company responded appropriately. We will defend against these baseless claims". In August 2021, the company requested that the lawsuit be dismissed, a motion that was granted September 23, 2022. Cooper filed an appeal, which the Manhattan appeals court dismissed on June 8, 2023.

== See also ==
- Black Birders Week
