= Xiye Bastida =

Mexican youth climate activist (born 2002)

- Bastida at the premiere of Run Amok at the 2026 Sundance Film Festival
- Born: 18 April 2002 (age 24); Atlacomulco, State of Mexico, Mexico
- Citizenship: Mexico, Chile
- Occupation: Climate justice activist
- Years active: 2017-present
- Known for: School strike for climate Re-Earth Initiative
- Notable work: All We Can Save (contributor)
- Website: www.xiyebeara.com

Xiye Bastida Patrick ("she-yeh", [ʃi-jɛ]; born 18 April 2002) is a Mexican-born, New York-based climate activist. She is of Otomi descent, one of the indigenous peoples of Mexico. She is one of the major organizers of Fridays for Future in New York City, and has been a leading voice for indigenous and immigrant visibility in climate activism. She was in 2020 a co-founder (with Theresa Rose Sebastian) and as of September 2026 is executive director of the youth-driven organization Re-Earth Initiative.

== Early life and education ==
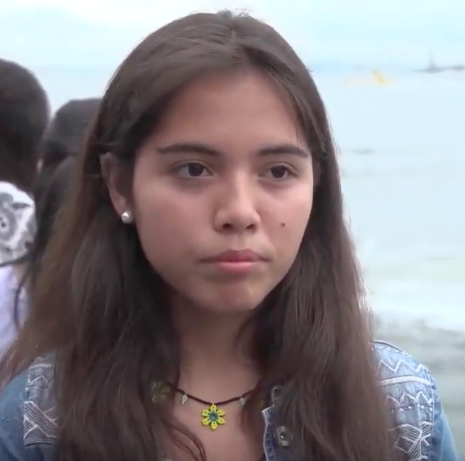
Bastida awaiting Greta Thunberg's arrival, 2019

Xiye (Note: Xiye is pronounced "she-yeh", [ʃi-jɛ].) Bastida Patrick was born on 18 April 2002 in Atlacomulco, State of Mexico, to parents Mindahi and Geraldine, who are also environmentalists, and raised in the village of San Pedro Tultepec in the municipality of Lerma. Her father is of Otomi descent while her Chilean mother has Celtic ancestry.

Bastida and her family moved to New York City after extreme flooding hit their hometown of San Pedro Tultepec in 2015, following three years of drought.

Bastida attended The Beacon School. She enrolled at the University of Pennsylvania College of Arts and Sciences in 2020, and graduated with a degree in environmental studies and policy.

As of 2019 Bastida held dual Mexican and Chilean citizenship.

== Activism ==
Bastida began her activism with an environmental club. The club protested at Albany and New York City Hall and lobbied for the Climate and Community Leaders Protection Act (CLCPA) and the Dirty Buildings Bill. It was then she heard about Greta Thunberg and her climate strikes.

Bastida was one of the major organizers of Fridays for Future (School Strike for Climate) New York City at the age of 19, and has been a leading voice for indigenous and immigrant visibility in climate activism.

Bastida gave a speech on Indigenous Cosmology at the 9th United Nations World Urban Forum, and was awarded the "Spirit of the UN Award" in 2018.

Bastida led her high school, The Beacon School, in the first major climate strike in New York City, on 15 March 2019. She and Alexandria Villaseñor officially greeted Thunberg upon her arrival from Europe by boat in September 2019 to attend the UN Climate Summit. Xiye has been coined "America's Greta Thunberg" however has said that "calling youth activists the ‘Greta Thunberg’ of their country diminishes Greta's personal experience and individual struggles".

Bastida contributed to All We Can Save (2020), an anthology of essays about climate change written by women. In 2021 she spoke at the Leadership Summit on Climate hosted by the Biden Administration, delivering a speech urging world leaders to participate more in climate activism.

While unable to vote in the United States as she was not an American citizen, Bastida indicated support for Massachusetts Senator Elizabeth Warren in the 2020 presidential election, although stressing the bipartisanship of the climate movement.

In 2025, Bastida gave a TED Talk on climate justice and intergenerational leadership, emphasizing the importance of Indigenous knowledge, youth activism, and equitable solutions to the climate crisis. She shared her personal journey as an environmental advocate and called for systemic change that centers frontline communities in global climate policy.

=== Roles in organizations ===
Bastida is a former member of Sunrise Movement and Extinction Rebellion.

She is co-founder (with Theresa Rose Sebastian) and (as of September 2026) executive director of Re-Earth Initiative, "a youth-driven movement committed to reshaping the future by empowering communities with knowledge, resources, and regenerative practices". The organization was founded on 22 April 2020, the 50th anniversary of Earth Day, a month after the launch of a digital campaign called "We The Planet". Re-Earth administers a funding program called "RE!Granting", which assists individuals and communities in leading positive change in work supporting or restoring fragile ecosystems.

Bastida is on the administration committee of the People's Climate Movement.

== In film ==
Teen Vogue released a documentary short We Rise on Bastida in December 2019. Bastida collaborated with 2040 Film to create a three-minute video called Imagine the Future, exploring what landscapes and cityscapes could look like in the future. It was released on YouTube in March 2020.

She co-produced and narrated the film The Way of the Whale, which premiered at the 2026 Sundance Film Festival in February 2026. The film, which took three years to make and was directed and shot by Franco Campos-Lopez Benyunes, is about the relationship how gray whales and their calves seek out human interaction at Laguna San Ignacio, a lagoon on the coast of Mexico’s Baja California in Mexico. The film was a Magen Entertainment production, in association with the Ocean Foundation and the International Community Foundation. The score was composed by Adrian Lino Hernandez.

In 2026 Bastida appears in a documentary film presented by English actor Benedict Cumberbatch, titled How to Live on Earth, which was released on YouTube on 20 September 2026. The film is about how we can live in ways that help to protect nature and the planet.

== Recognition and awards ==
- 2018: Spirit of the UN Award
- 2023: On Time magazine's TIME100 Next list, which recognizes rising leaders across multiple fields
- 2024: DVF Leadership Award
- 2026: Listed on the Forbes 30 Under 30 2026 social impact list

== Filmography ==
- We Rise (2019; subject of documentary)
- Imagine the future (2020; 3-minute video; writer and narrator)
- The Way of the Whale (2026; co-producer and narrator)
- How to Live on Earth (2026; appearance)
