= Behold the Earth =

- Directed by: David Conover
- Produced by: David Conover; Josie Merck
- Starring: E. O. Wilson; Cal DeWitt; Theo Colborn; Corina Newsome; Ben Lowe; Katharine Hayhoe
- Music by: Dirk Powell; Tim Eriksen; Rhiannon Giddens; Sophie and Amelia Powell
- Distributed by: Brainstorm Media
- Release dates: March 19, 2017 (Environmental Film Festival in the Nation's Capitol); October 2, 2018
- Running time: 63 minutes
- Country: United States
- Language: English

Behold the Earth is a feature-length musical documentary film that inquires into America's estrangement from nature, built out of conversations with leading biologists and evangelical Christians, and directed by David Conover. The film made its debut at the 2017 DC Environmental Film Festival.

== Cast ==
- E. O. Wilson—renowned biologist, Pulitzer Prize-winning author, and Pellegrino University Research Professor in Entomology for the Department of Organismic and Evolutionary Biology at Harvard University. He is the author of The Creation: An Appeal to Save Life on Earth.
- Cal DeWitt—Professor of Environmental Studies at the Gaylord Nelson Institute for Environmental Studies, University of Wisconsin–Madison and President Emeritus of the Au Sable Institute of Environmental Studies. He is considered by many to be a formative influence behind the Creation Care movement.
- Theo Colborn—co-authored the 1996 book, Our Stolen Future, which brought worldwide attention to the fact that common contaminants can interfere with human fetal development.
- Corina Newsome – Ambassador Animal Keeper at the Nashville Zoo at Grassmere and recent alumna of Malone University's Zoo & Wildlife Biology program. She is a member of the group Young Evangelicals for Climate Action (Y.E.C.A.), as well as a public educator, musician, and creation care activist.
- Ben Lowe – Prominent environmental advocate and activist; writer, politician, and Evangelical. Ben has over ten years of experience in nonprofit work, and is a founder of Y.E.C.A, as well as a National Organizer and Spokesperson for the organization. He was appointed as an Environmental Commissioner for the Village of Glen Ellyn from 2013 to 2015, and served as a Trustee and then Board Chair for Au Sable Institute of Environmental Studies from 2010 to 2016. Ben has authored three books; Green Revolution: Coming Together to Care for Creation (2009), Doing Good Without Giving Up: Sustaining Social Action in a World That's Hard to Change (2014), and The Future of Our Faith: An Intergenerational Conversation on Critical Issues Facing the Church (2016).
- Katharine Hayhoe – Associate Professor in the Department of Political Science and Director of the Climate Center at Texas Tech University, critically acclaimed atmospheric scientist, and the founder and CEO of ATMOS Research. Katharine's current work focuses primarily on climate change and its local impacts on human and environmental systems. She is featured in a documentary about climate change in Alaska called Between Earth and Sky, and contributed to National Geographic's second season of Years of Living Dangerously. In October 2016 Katherine spoke at SXSL alongside U.S. President Barack Obama and actor and philanthropist Leonardo DiCaprio about the effects and concerns of climate change.

== Music Talent ==
- Dirk Powell – American singer, songwriter, producer, and composer. Dirk's interest in his Appalachian heritage led him to become an internationally recognized expert on traditional Appalachian fiddle and banjo musical styles. He has won four Grammy Awards and collaborated with musical talents such as Jack White, Joan Baez, and Jackson Browne. Dirk has worked with several reputable film directors as well, including Anthony Minghella, Spike Lee, Victor Nuñez and Ang Lee. Dirk is a regular contributor to the award-winning BBC series, Transatlantic Sessions.
- Sophie and Amelia Powell – Emerging musicians, and the daughters of musicians Dirk Powell and Christine Balfa. They currently live in Louisiana.
- Tim Eriksen – American musician, musicologist, professor, consultant, solo artist, and former member of the band Cordelia's Dad. Tim earned a PhD in ethnomusicology from Wesleyan University, and has taught as a visiting music professor at Dartmouth College, Amherst College, Hampshire College, and the University of Minnesota. Tim is the founder of the world's largest Sacred Harp singing convention in Northampton, Massachusetts. Tim is passionate about music history and sharing his knowledge and passion with others through his teaching.
- Rhiannon Giddens – American musician, known widely as the lead singer, violinist, and banjo player in the band Carolina Chocolate Drops. Music by the Grammy-winning Carolina Chocolate Drops varies from country, blues, folk, Americana, Celtic, soul, gospel, and bluegrass. Rhiannon has also pursued a solo music career, releasing her debut solo album Tomorrow is My Turn, and in EP, "Factory Girl", in 2015. Her most recent releases are "Freedom Highway," initially performed at Sing Sing, and "At the Purchaser's Option." Rhiannon studied opera at the Oberlin Conservatory, and was a 2017 MacArthur Fellowship recipient.

== See also ==
- David Conover
- Compass Light
- Sunrise Earth
