= David G. Conover =

American documentary film and television director

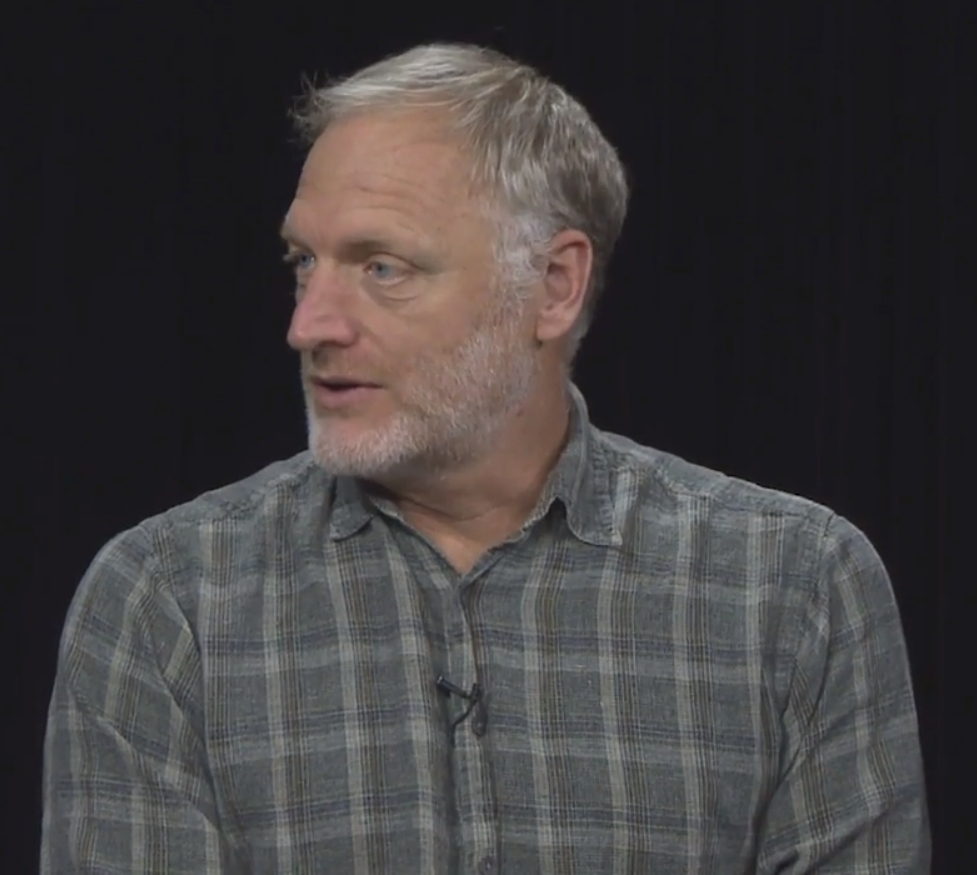

David G. Conover is an American documentary film and television director. His production company, Compass Light, based in Camden, Maine, is most widely known for producing Sunrise Earth for HD Theater.

== Biography ==
David Conover was born and raised in a New England family with strong ties to the sea and a tradition of active storytelling. Both grandfathers were amateur filmmakers in the 1920s and 30's. Upon graduating with a degree in comparative religious studies from Bowdoin College, David worked as a professional seaman—he has extensive experience in the Atlantic and Pacific. He did a double-handed transatlantic crossing while filming Passage. He spent five years designing and teaching sea courses for kids age 14–18 at the Hurricane Island Outward Bound School in Maine and in Florida. This was followed by a master's degree in Education at Harvard, where David studied moral development and then a second year as a teaching assistant the Kennedy School in Leadership Studies. In 2014-15, David was appointed as a Coastal Studies Scholar at Bowdoin College. As of 2012 he served on the Hurricane Island Foundation Board of Directors and The Ocean Foundation's Advisory Board. David lives in Camden, Maine.

== Compass Light ==
Conover has been making film and television show for nearly 30 years, focusing on the sea and the outdoors. Conover's production company, Compass Light, grew out of his early work, and the studios moved to the seaport of Camden, Maine in 1994 in order to be closer to the ocean and the stories being produced. The company has produced over 80 films for broadcast and educational clients. Awards include the National Outdoor Production Award, a Blue Ribbon by the National Educational Media Competition, and two nominations for a National Emmy as Outstanding Director & Outstanding Science and Technology Program.

== Experiential TV ==
Conover's team conceived and developed a new format of television, called “Experiential TV" and subsequently “Slow TV,” in 2003. This is a radically observational and carefully crafted aesthetic, which makes the most of the HD format and is exemplified by the nature series Conover’s team created in 2004, called Sunrise Earth, in which not a single word is spoken and features picturesque remote locations as the sun rises in real time. In 2007, Conover co-founded BlueMarvel, an aggregator and distributor of the Experiential TV format. The format was called “Slow TV” by Geir Berthelsen*, the Norwegian founder of the World Institute of Slowness. Slow TV is usually grouped within the “slow movement.”**

The Sunrise Earth concept is simple: place a camera somewhere and record the view and sounds of the sunrise. According to David Schaefer of Discovery Channel it took on “something of a cult status among people with high-end televisions.” Andrew Sullivan, of the Daily Dish, writes “this devastatingly simple project soothes the soul.”*** Sunrise Earth is a broadcast series that aired every morning on Discovery’s HD Theater channel. Compass Light produced 50 episodes for Discovery HD by October 2006, when Sunrise Earth International began to air, featuring scenes from exotic locations in Asia, Europe, and South America.

On completion of production in 2008, Sunrise Earth became a 65-hour series that has aired two hours a day on domestic and international Discovery Channels since September, 2004. The series makes the claim to the only long-running broadcast series in which not a single word is spoken.

== Conservation Media Group ==
In 2014 Conover launched Conservation Media Group, a Maine-based non-profit.

Conservation Media Group's pilot effort supported the campaign of the Appalachian Mountain Club and the Society for the Preservation Of New Hampshire Forests, in their "Bury or Stop Northern Pass." The campaign petition generated more than 10,000 signatures opposing the plans for a 187-mile overland power line from hydroelectric facilities in Canada, proposed by Northeast Utilities. A second effort supported the Ban Deep Sea Trawling campaign of Bloom Association.

== Films by David Conover ==
- Behold the Earth 2017
- Islands in the Wind 2011
- Creating Synthetic Life 2010
- Sunrise Earth (Series) 2004–present
- Cracking the Ocean Code 2005
- Live from the ISS 2002-3
- Mid-Water Mysteries 2002
- Quest for Captain Kidd 2001
- Fishing for the Future 2001
- The Vikings 2001
- Uncovering a Pirate’s Graveyard 2000
- Search for the Giant Lobster 2000
- Coral Heaven 1999
- The Viking Saga: L’Anse aux Meadows 1998
- Williams-Mystic: the Coastal and Ocean Studies Program of Williams College and Mystic Seaport 1994

== Awards ==
- National Outdoor Production Award
- Blue Ribbon – National Educational Media Competition
- Nominated for a National Emmy as Outstanding Director
- Nominated for a National Emmy as Outstanding Science and Technology Program
