= New York energy law =

Laws of the US state of New York

New York energy law is the statutory, regulatory, and common law of the state of New York concerning the policy, conservation, taxation, and utilities involved in energy. Secondary sources have also influenced energy law in New York.

The myriad legal issues concerning hydrofracking in New York has in the 2010s spawned a new body of legal authority with primary authorities such as case law, statutes, and zoning regulations, as well as secondary sources such as law review and newspaper articles, for this rapidly changing field of law.

== Energy Law (Consolidated Laws) ==
The New York Consolidated Laws includes a statutory code called the "Energy Law". Under New York law, "energy" and "energy resources" are defined as:

"Energy" means work or heat that is, or may be, produced from any fuel or source whatsoever. ... "Energy resources" shall mean any force or material which yields or has the potential to yield energy, including but not limited to electrical, fossil, geothermal, wind, hydro, solid waste, tidal, wood, solar and nuclear sources.

— N.Y. Energy Law § 1-103 (5) and (6).

The N.Y. Energy Law became effective on July 26, 1976 as Chapter 17-A of the Consolidated Laws. The 1970s was a period of tremendous expansion of both federal and state laws concerning energy.

This code is divided into these articles, which are not sequential:
1. Short Title; Definitions
3. State Energy Policy
5. State Energy Office, etc.
7. Transfer of Functions
8. Light Efficiency Standards (for existing buildings) Act
9. Energy Performance (for public buildings)
10. Fuel Set-aside Act
11. Conservation Construction Code Act
12. Solar Energy Products Warranty Act
13. State Green Building Construction Act (new, "Effective Date: 03/24/2009")
16. Appliance Efficiency Standards (new)
17. Energy Information
18. Temporary Nuclear Waste Repositories
21. Energy Supply and Production
Appendix – Rules

The Bluebook citation for McKinney's Statutes is N.Y. Engy. L., while for the Consolidated Laws, the citation is "Energy".

== Recent legislation and Legislative committees ==
=== State senate ===
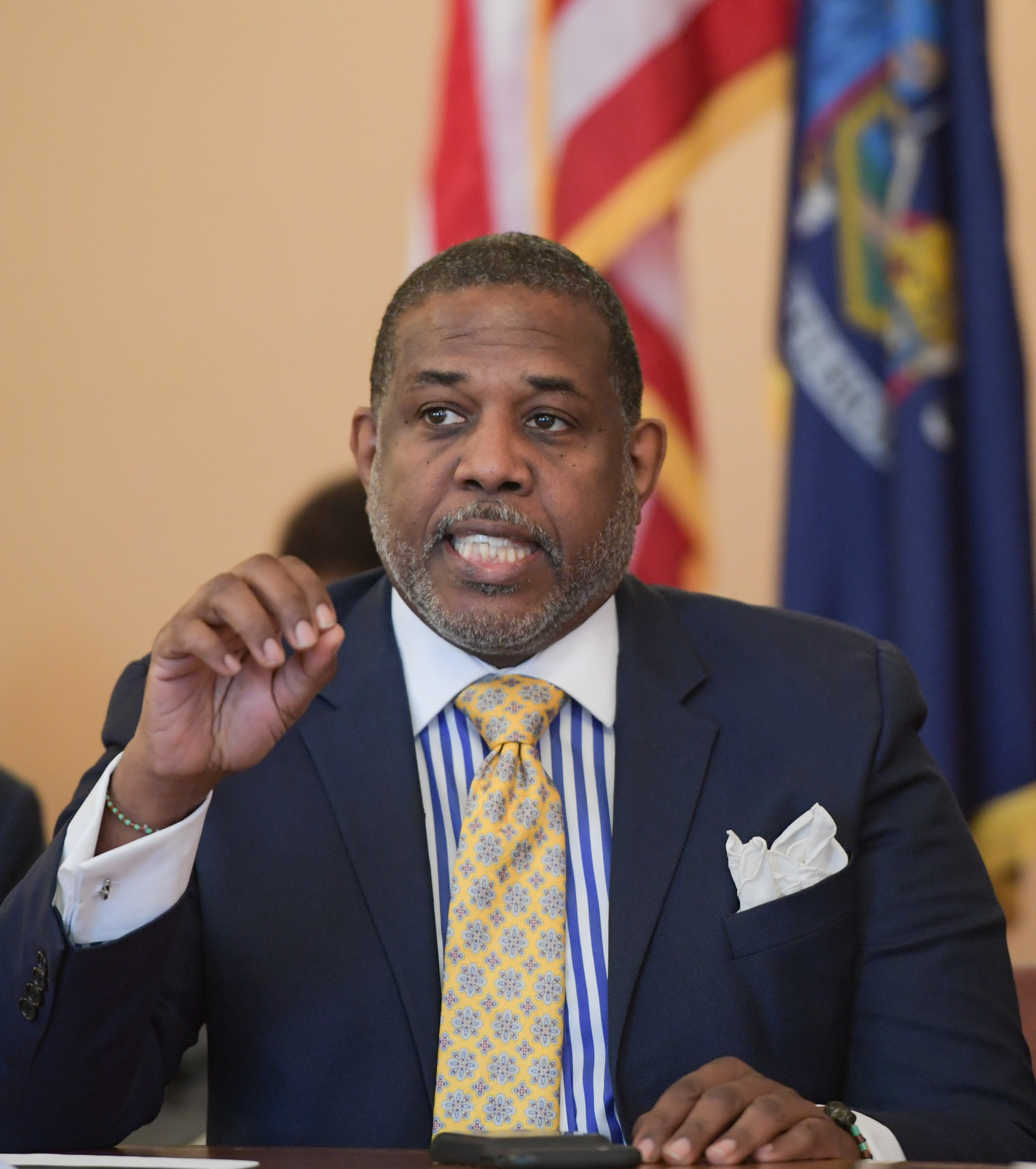
New York State Senator Kevin Parker, chair (as of 2025) of the Senate Committee on Energy and Telecommunications

The New York State Senate Energy and Telecommunications Committee is chaired by Kevin Parker, of Brooklyn.

The energy and telecommunications committee was previously chaired by Senator Joseph Griffo, a Republican from Rome, in Oneida County; before that Republican Senator George D. Maziarz, of Newfane, in western Niagara County, was chair, and prior to Maziarz, Democratic Senator Darrel Aubertine, of upstate Cape Vincent, Jefferson County, was chair of the committee.

This is Parker's second term as chair of the energy and telecommunications committee. Before 2009, it was a "backbench" committee; in 2008, the Senate referred six bills to the Assembly Energy committee, but none of them were passed. Senate Majority Leader Malcolm Smith replaced Senator Parker, then chair, with Aubertine on May 11, 2009, after Parker's arrest on harassment charges. Aubertine supported an extension to the "Power for Jobs" state program. In November 2010, Aubertine lost re-election, and the Republicans garnered a majority. In 2014, Maziarz held a meeting with the Public Service Commission to discuss the PSC's extension of the 18-a surcharge (the temporary utility assessment) which he claimed overcharged ratepayers by $250 million and the state Senate Republicans were calling a new state tax. Maziarz chose not to run for re-election in 2014 after being charged by former state Attorney General Eric Schneiderman with election law violations. In 2018, the Democratic party regained the majority.

The Senate Environmental Conservation, as standing committee, was chaired by Todd Kaminsky, of Long Island.

=== Assembly ===
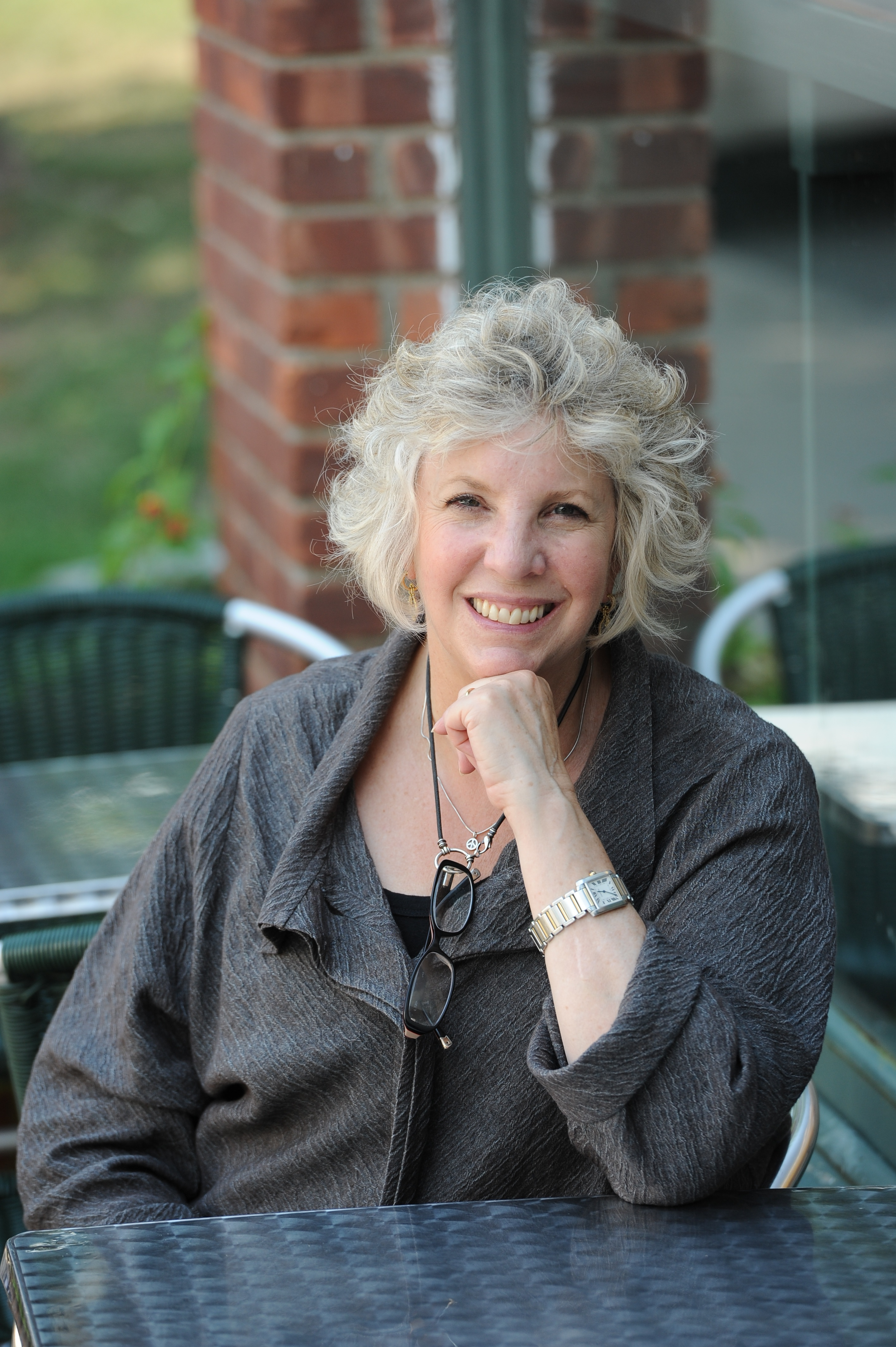
Didi Barrett, chairperson of the New York State Assembly standing committee on Energy

As of July 2025, Didi Barrett, representing parts of Dutchess and Columbia Counties, is chairperson of the New York State Assembly Standing Committee on Energy. She is also a member of the Committee on Environmental Conservation.

From 2018 until January 1, 2023, Member of the Assembly Michael Cusick, a Democrat representing parts of Staten Island, was chairperson.

In 2014, Member of the Assembly Amy Paulin, representing parts of suburban Westchester County, was the chair. Congressman Paul Tonko, Assemblyman Kevin Cahill, representing Upstate Ulster and Dutchess counties, and Thomas O'Mara are all past chairs. Former comptroller Andrew Hevesi, was formerly a chair of the Assembly Renewable Energy subcommittee.

In 2017, the Committee on Energy held hearings to discuss the pending shut down of Indian Point, Zero-Emissions Credits, and the Clean Energy Standard. Committee on Energy hearings in 2009 included hearings on the New York Independent System Operator's Electricity Commodity Pricing, the December Ice Storm power outages, and an annual report.

The Assembly Energy committee "has jurisdiction over legislation related to energy availability and sources, policy and planning, conservation, and electric and gas rate-making in New York State". This includes any amendments to N.Y. Energy Law and Public Service Law. It has concurrent jurisdiction over the authorities and agencies dealing with energy, including NYSERDA, the Long Island Power Authority, Department of Environmental Conservation, and the Power Authority of the State of New York.

=== New 2007 to 2022 laws ===
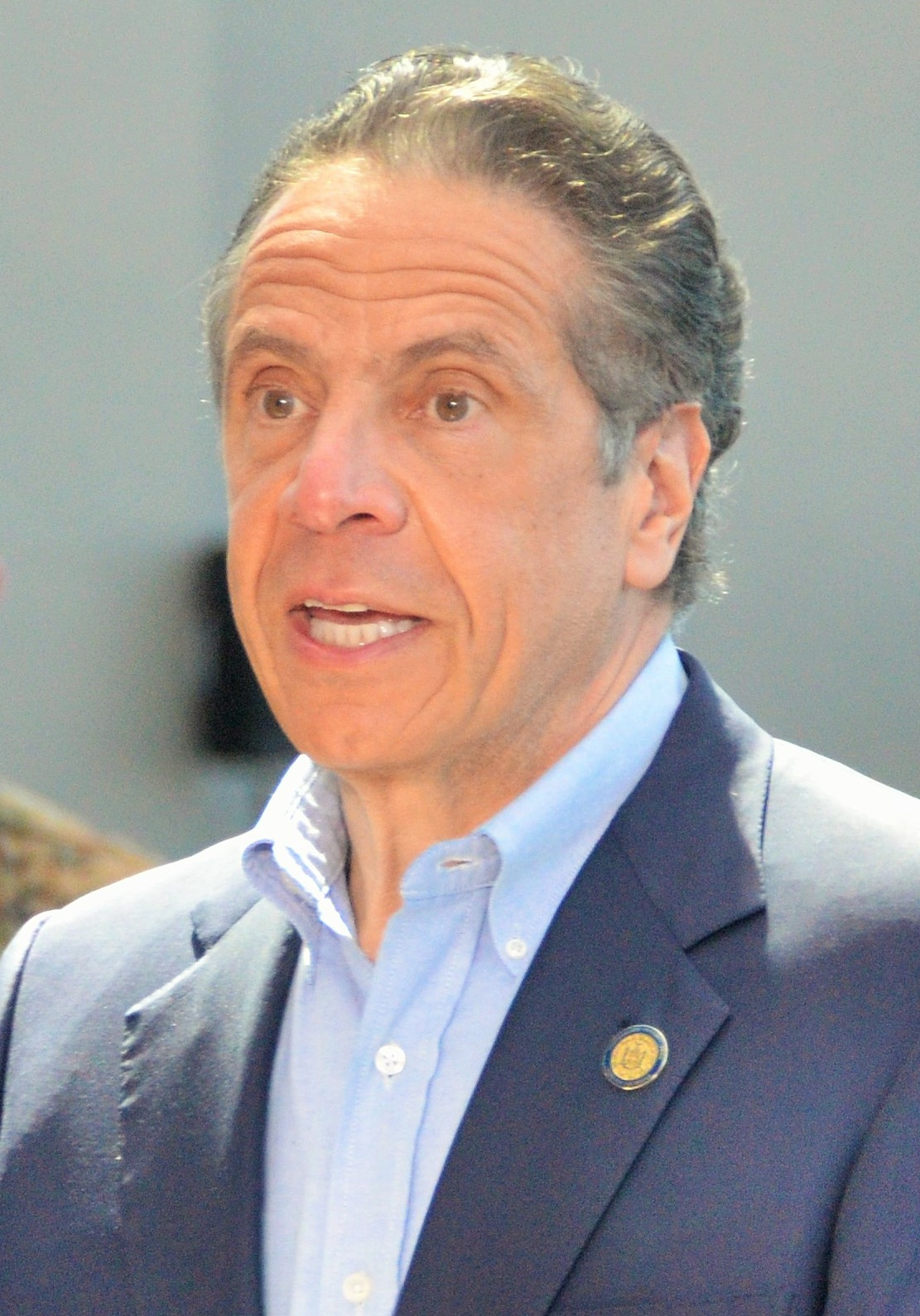
Andrew Cuomo, Governor of New York (2011-2021), in 2021

The state has enacted, in 2007, a number of recent laws to control carbon emissions. There is also a new Article 13 of N.Y. Energy Law, the State Green Building Construction Act, in 2008. This new Act is composed of four sections, including N.Y. Energy L. § 13–107, "Agency green building construction requirements". They also passed a law to establish a "Green Residential Building Grant Program", which directs NYSERDA to grant moneys subject to LEED. The LEED status of a recently built state authority convention center - the Albany Capital Center - is unknown. Finally, the legislature also enacted three closely related laws to expand "Net metering" of alternative energy generating systems.

Senator Kevin Parker stated that he had been "aiming for a long time" to work on energy and environmental issues. Among the issues he wanted to address are "energy generation and transmission... public transportation... [and] Renewable energy... " Assemblyman Cahill noted equally "ambitious goals for renewable power and energy conservation", especially by funding the State Energy Plan, "mass transit", repowering "Old hydro facilities" and modernizing the states "electric grid". NYSERDA president Francis Murray, Jr. echoed that it was "the most ambitious clean-energy program in the nation".

The Power New York Act, enacted in July 2011, re-establishes the Article 10 energy plant siting law, which had expired (sunsetted) over seven years prior. The new law had overwhelmingly favorable editorial support.

In 2012, several items on Governor Andrew Cuomo's agenda were done:

1. Launch of the New York Energy highway (see below)
2. Passage of tax credits for solar leasing
3. Passage of tax exemptions for solar power for all building classes.

For 2012 income taxes, taxpayers can now take a credit for "Solar Energy System Equipment Credit" by using Form IT-255.

In 2013, in response to Hurricane Sandy, the 2013 LIPA Reform Act was passed. This bill shifted operation of LIPA's electric transmission and distribution system from National Grid to PSEG-LI and also allowed for greater review of LIPA's finances by the Public Service Commission. The Act has been criticized by the New York State Comptroller for increasing retail rates, increasing LIPA's debt, and decreasing consumer transparency.

A 2016 bill to create tax incentives for geothermal energy systems was vetoed by Governor Cuomo.

As part of the FY 2023 state budget, Governor Kathy Hochul signed a legislative agreement to suspend the gasoline and certain other fuel taxes from June 1 to December 31, 2022.

=== New 2023 to 2026 laws and bills ===
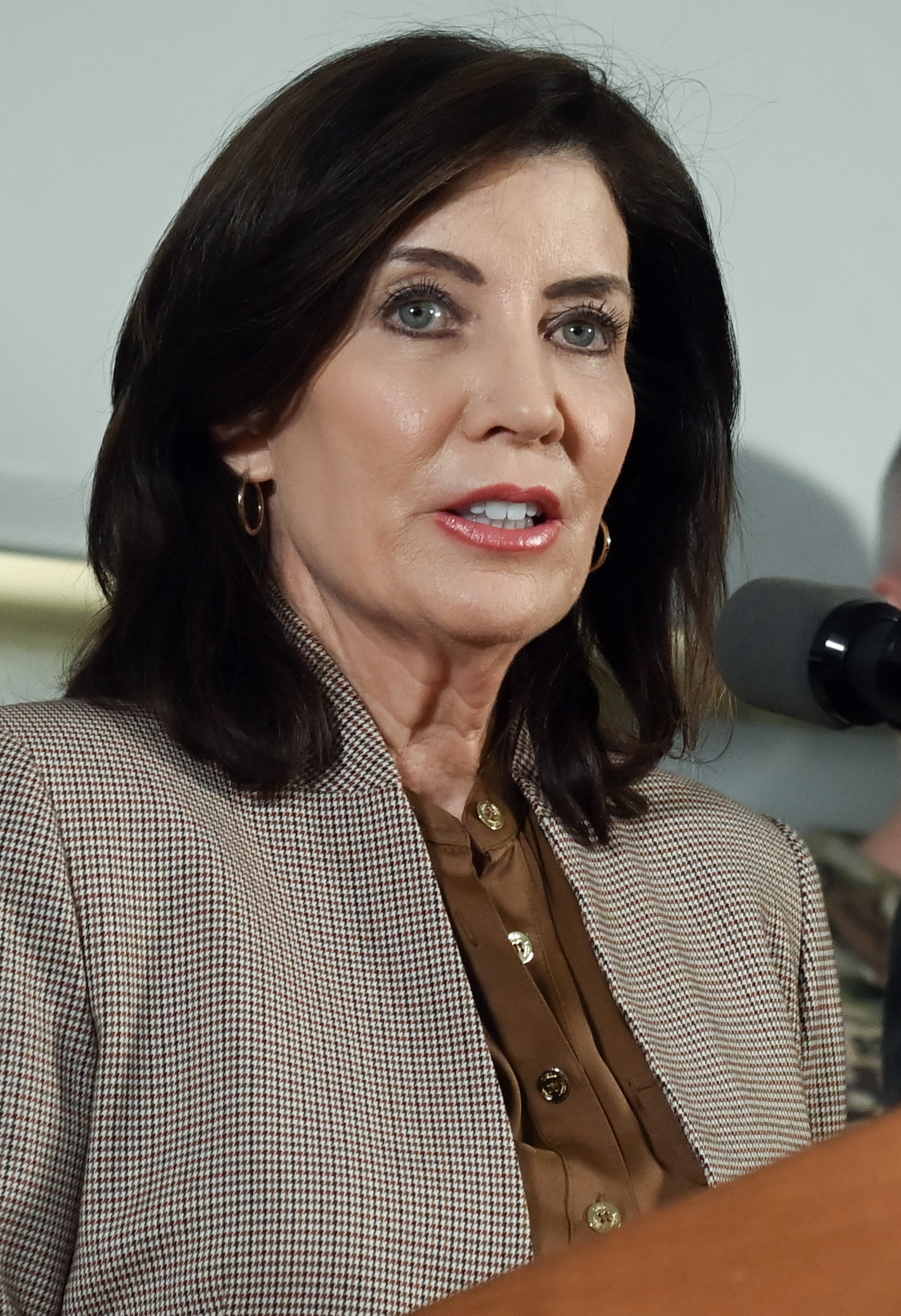
Kathy Hochul, Governor of New York, in 2024

There is a proposed bill that would "regulate outdoor night lighting to preserve and enhance the state's dark sky." As of September 2026, it is in the Senate Environmental Conservation Committee.

== Related statutes ==
In Consolidated Laws, there are many sections that have cross-references to, or relate to, N.Y. Energy Law and energy taxes in New York. Within N.Y. Environmental Conservation Law are several articles relevant to energy, including the Mineral Resources laws, article 23. This is also called the N.Y. Oil, Gas, and Solution Mining Law, which includes permitting, fees, and related laws.

New York taxes a variety of energy uses and products. The state publishes monthly statistics of all tax revenue, including for petroleum and other taxes. The state collects an effective rate of 24.4 cents per gallon tax on gasoline and gasohol ("motor fuel"), and 22.65 cents per gallon on diesel. The Empire State is tied with California for the highest combined gas taxes, at 67.7 cents per gallon. New York also has a motor fuel tax. It requires a certification that the tax has been assumed or paid by the distributor. The state requires certain records to be kept. The state also has a "highway use tax".

As of 2007, New York collected one of the smallest amounts of revenue from extraction taxes of any state—only 5.8 percent of its overall sources.

New York has a statute that regulates the "Recording of solar energy easements". It requires that such easements be in writing, signed, and acknowledged with the same formalities as recording other conveyances. It also requires, "Any instrument creating a solar energy easement shall include ... (a) The vertical and horizontal angles, expressed in degrees, at which the solar energy easement extends over the real property ... (b) Any terms or conditions ... [and] (c) Any provisions for compensation of the owner of the property...."

The state has an "alternative fuels (tax) credit" at N.Y. Tax Law § 187-b that applies to certain hybrid cars, against the franchise taxes in Tax Law §§ 183, 184, 185. It does not apply to any individual income tax.

Other related sections of the N.Y. Consolidated laws include:

1. Executive Law § 11 Fuel and energy shortage state of emergency
2. Executive Law § 29-G Emergency management assistance compact
3. Executive Law § 201-A State clean-fueled vehicle program
4. Public Service Law § 66 General powers of commission in respect to gas, etc.
5. Public Service Law § 66-C Conservation of energy
6. Public Service Law § 66-G Sale of indigenous natural gas for generation of energy
7. State Finance Law § 127-A Energy conservation in state-aided programs
8. Tax Law § 19 Green building credit
9. Tax Law § 186-a Tax on the furnishing of utility services (a tax of 2 1/2% starting January 1, 2000, on gross income is imposed on "every provider of telecommunication services")
10. Tax Law § 301-I Energy business
11. Tax Law § 1105-A Reduced tax rate on certain energy sources and services
12. Social Services Law § 153-F State reimbursement of home energy grant expenses
13. Real Property Tax Law § 487 Exemption from taxation for certain solar or wind.

There are also at least two unconsolidated sections of law that refer to Energy Law, which allow for a credit against certain local taxes. In addition, the Climate Leadership and Community Protection Act effects energy law.

== Case law ==
There is a body of case law concerning energy in New York, enough for NY Jur 2d to have a listing for "Energy", and case law on energy taxation.

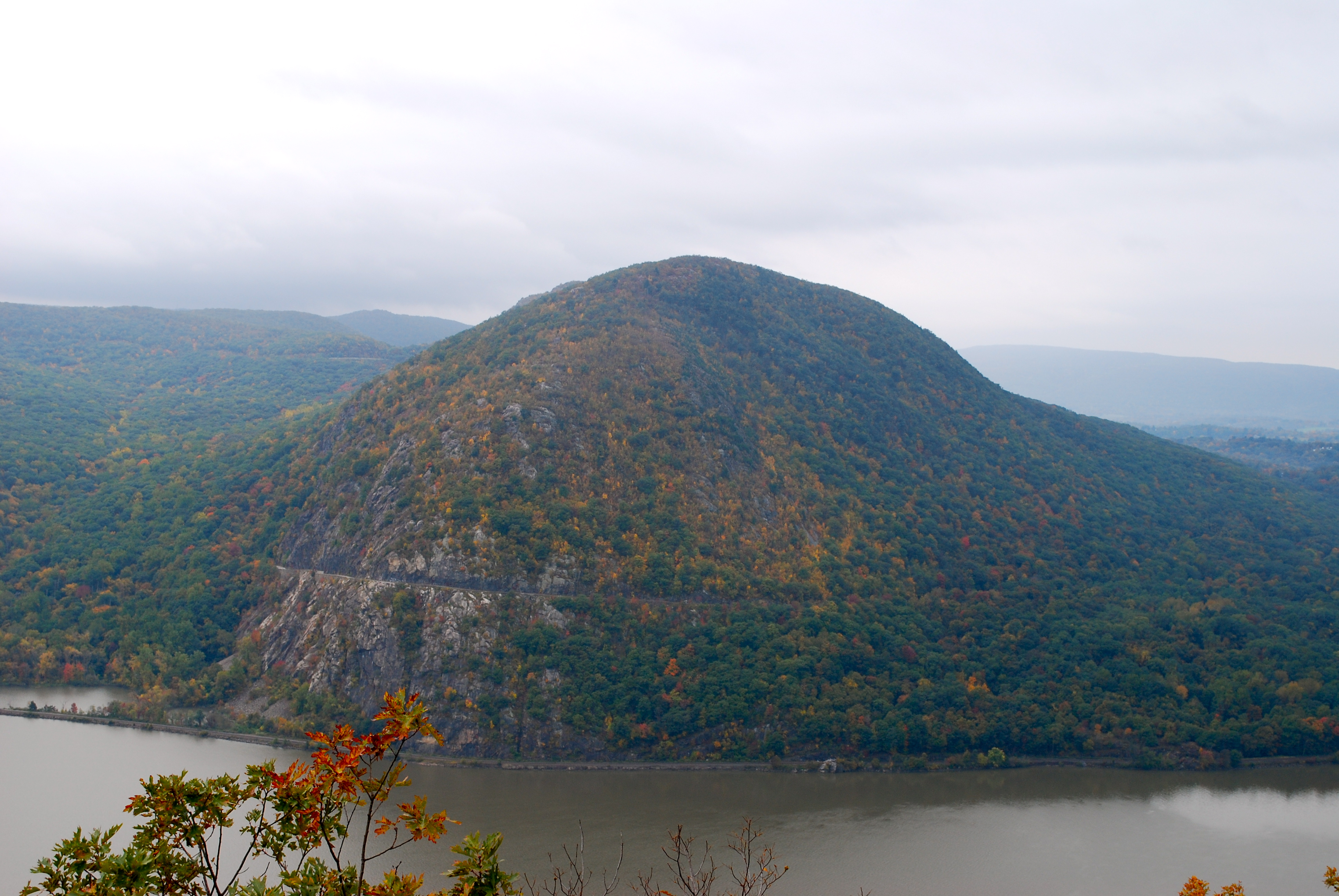
Storm King and New York State Route 218 as seen from atop Breakneck Ridge

One of the most critical cases in New York energy law history is probably the precedent-setting Scenic Hudson Preservation Conference v. Federal Power Commission, 354 F.2d 608 (2d Cir. 1965), known as the Storm King case, in which the court held that Scenic Hudson had legal standing because of their "special interest in aesthetic, conservational, and recreational aspects" of the mountain.

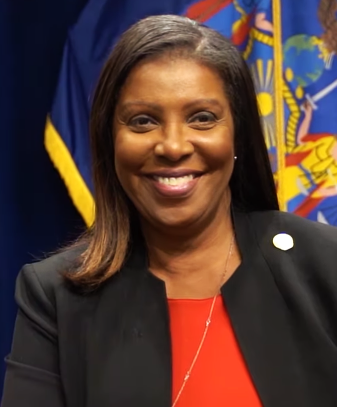
Letitia James, New York Attorney General (as of 2025)

Under New York law, both the New York Attorney General or a district attorney may prosecute alleged polluters who make oil spills.

The motor fuel excise tax is collected from a "distributor" – usually a wholesaler – even though the ultimate burden to pay the tax may be on a retailer or purchaser. There is a presumption of taxability, so taxing authorities can allow reasonably for only a 1% loss for "evaporation and spillage" in long-term storage tanks. A bus company, such as Greyhound bus, is considered a distributor for the purposes of the motor fuel excise tax. A retailer is liable for the amount of tax due bought from a supplier from New Jersey.

The issue of taxation of Native Americans for motor fuel has created a moderately large body of case law in itself. While the state can not impose excise taxes directly on "Indians", it can tax the sale of fuel to non-Indians even on Indian reservations. This statute, dictating the collection of gas and similar taxes, does not violate the Commerce Clause. The law has also been upheld as not in violation of the Equal Protection Clause, based on the rational basis test.

Conservation easements in New York have been created by caselaw and private real estate contracts.

In Matter of Suozzi v Tax Appeals Trib. of the State of N.Y., 2020 NY Slip Op 00193 (3d Dept. 2020), the Third Department appellate court held that a heat pump that draws kinetic energy from the potential energy in the ground "is not a qualified solar energy system within the meaning of [N, Y.] Tax Law § 606(g-1)." This is because the taxpayers didn't own solar panels, but "installed a ground source heat pump system to heat, cool and provide hot water for their home, [which] functions by way of a heat exchanger that is installed in the ground outside the home. The heat exchanger is a piping system that takes heat from the ground, which is generated by solar thermal energy stored in the earth's crust, and transfers it to a heat pump in order to bring heat from the ground into the home during cooler months." While "a ground source heat pump system indirectly utilizes solar radiation," they were not entitled to claim "a $5,000 Solar Energy System Equipment Tax Credit..." although their contractor had assured them they could; the taxpayers end up being audited and thus "owed the $5,000 tax credit, plus interest."

== Rules, regulations, and benefits ==
=== Regulatory law, generally ===
General energy regulations may be found at Title 9, Subtitle BB of the New York Code of Rules and Regulations (N.Y.C.R.R.). Changes to the rules are published in the New York Register.

New York regulation has "allowed consumers and businesses to choose their own supplier" of gas and electricity, in the hope that this will lower retail prices, as well as to spur the development of "more innovative products". However, these energy choices have not saved the ultimate consumer very much, because the price of natural gas, and any energy produced from it, had fallen relatively low as of 2012. The news report cited studies by AARP, the Public Utility Law Project, and the Retail Energy Supply Association (RESA), "an energy supplier trade group", were made between 2010 and 2012. Only if consumers switch from oil to gas would they save much money.

The New York Public Service Commission holds public hearings regarding the permits for gas lines.

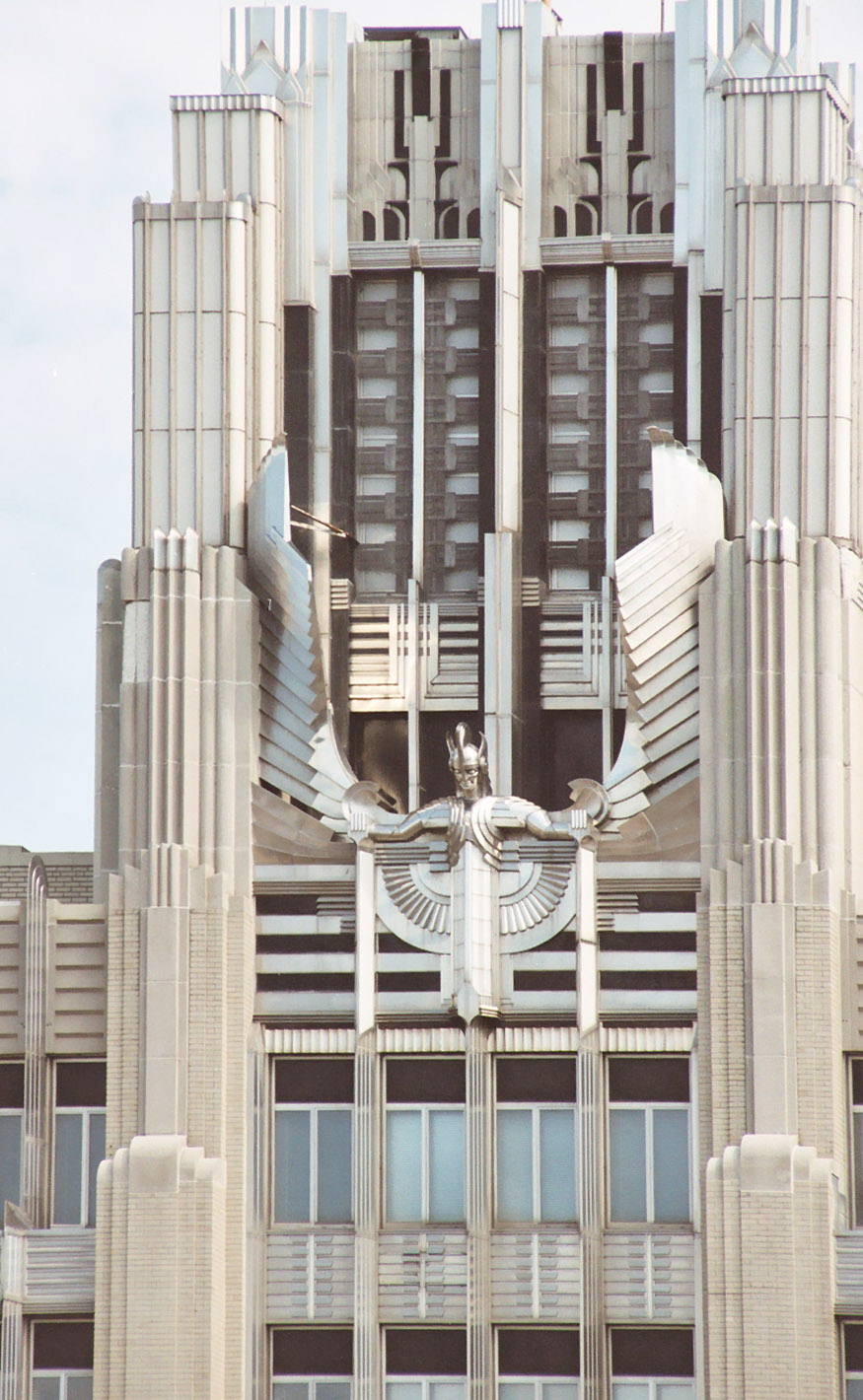
A portion of the Art Deco façade of the Niagara-Mohawk Power building in Syracuse, New York (2005), as of 2025 owned by National Grid plc

In 2019, Governor Cuomo threatened to cancel National Grid's franchise certificate to operate natural gas lines in downstate New York, unless they reversed a self-imposed moratorium on new gas customers; the effect would have been to prevent them from operating by regulatory dictate. National Grid faced a two-week deadline to reverse its denial of "gas service to over 1,100 customers" between May and November 2019; the utility "blamed New York’s rejection of an application for a $1 billion pipeline bringing natural gas from Pennsylvania’s shale gas fields," but the pipeline will not be ready until 2020. On November 26, 2019, National Grid agreed to end its moratorium to Brooklyn, Queens, Nassau and Suffolk Counties, and to give up to $7 million in customer assistance to remedy hardships created by the six-month moratorium. Attorney general Letitia James lauded the agreement, saying "I am grateful that Governor Cuomo pushed National grid to do the right thing and brought attention to this critical matter."

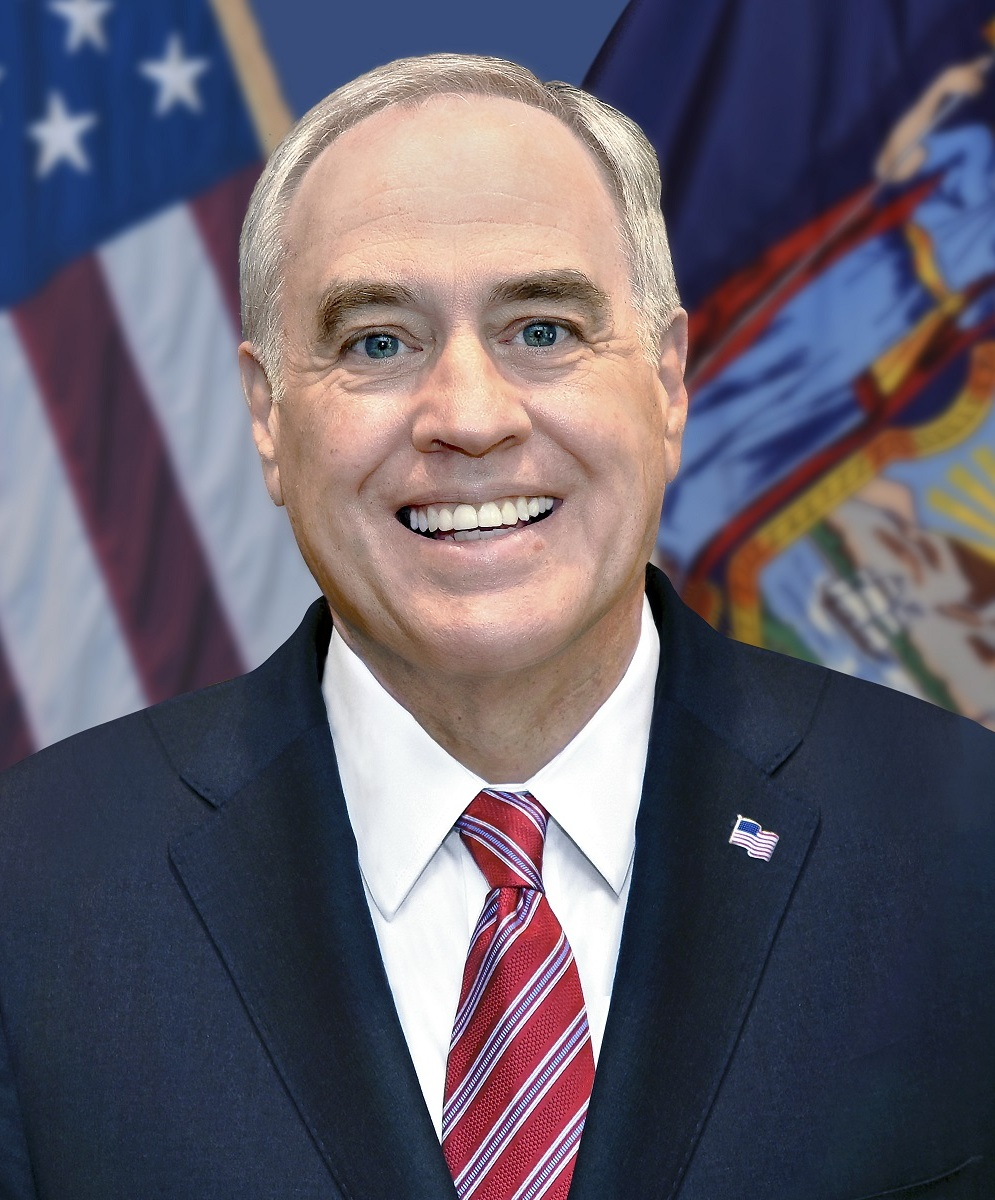
Tom DiNapoli, New York State Comptroller, as of 2025

The New York State Comptroller is the sole trustee of the state's $226 Billion state employees' pension plan and has the authority to issue regulations and trades according to that. On December 9, 2020, Thomas DiNapoli announced a plan to divest about $12 billion of that money from oil and gas companies to renewable energy companies, in line with the Paris Climate Agreement.

=== New York Energy Highway ===
The New York Energy Highway is a project developed by Governor Andrew Cuomo, and announced in his 2012 state of the state address. The purpose of the initiative is "to ensure that New York's energy grid remains the most advanced in the nation and to promote increased business investment in the state". A Task force was charged with "its implementation and enlisting the private sector". The Task Force is co-chaired by NYPA CEO Gil Quiniones and New York State Department of Environmental Conservation commissioner Joseph Martens. In April 2012, the Task Force held a summit at Columbia University to explore the issues involved. They also called for more ideas through an administrative request process, which that lasted from April 11 through May 30, 2012. According to co-chair Quiniones, writing in the industry paper EnergyBiz, the results were that 400 people attended the Energy Highway Summit, and 85 entities submitted over 100 suggestions and ideas for the Task Force.

The Energy Highway Blueprint is the Task Force's October 2012 report with 13 proposals, including investment of over $1 billion "new electric transmission capacity [and] new renewable energy projects", the retrofitting of "existing inefficient, high emission plants", the development of "Smart Grid technologies," and conducting "field studies of Atlantic Ocean offshore wind development potential".

In December of that year, Cuomo announced progress on the plan that included a $726 Million upgrade to the state's transmission network.

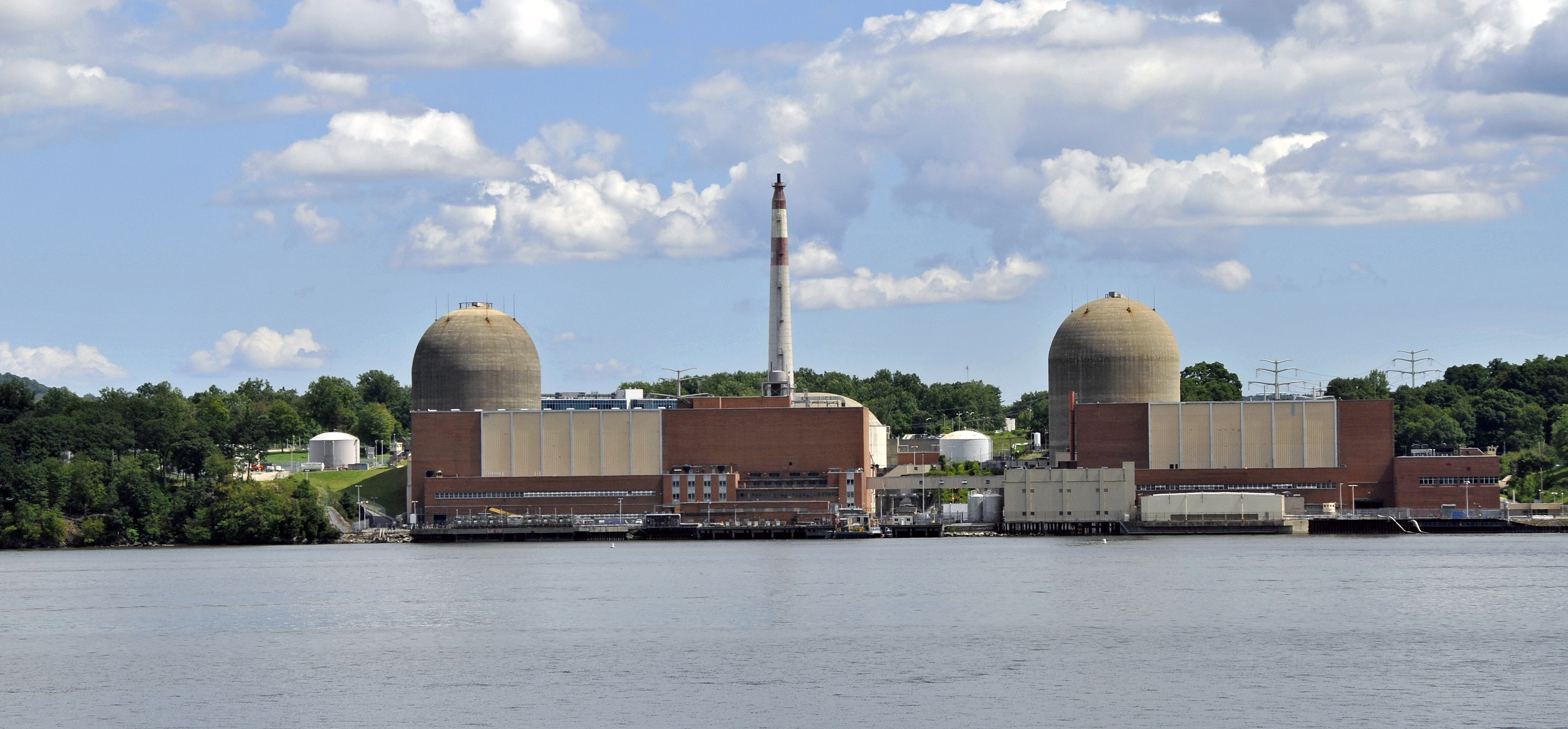
Indian Point Energy Center (I.P.E.C.) seen from across the Hudson River

In early 2013, the Public Service Commission solicited comments and accepted a report filed by ConEd and the state Power Authority about the future of the Indian Point Nuclear Power Plant, in particular the permitting process. Cuomo has indicated that he is against the continued use of Indian Point. The October 2012 Blueprint called for alternatives to Indian Point, which was the only plant named specifically by his administration for closure and replacement. However, the Task Force has no administrative authority to close Indian Point. Furthermore, the Task Force's Blueprint is not directly linked to Cuomo's opposition to renewal of that plant's permit by the Nuclear Regulatory Commission. Nonetheless, in a December 2012 press release about the transmission upgrade funding, Cuomo noted in dictum that:

other actions undertaken to advance the Energy Highway Blueprint include ... A PSC order for Con Edison to work with NYPA on contingency plans for the potential closing of Indian Point in Westchester County.

— Governor Andrew Cuomo, Press release, December 19, 2012

The Task Force identified two coal-operated energy plants' reliability issues, and are working with the Public Service Commission and two utilities, National Grid and NYSEG, on the matter. They also have worked on the "key items" of "easing transmission congestion [and] expanding natural gas delivery".

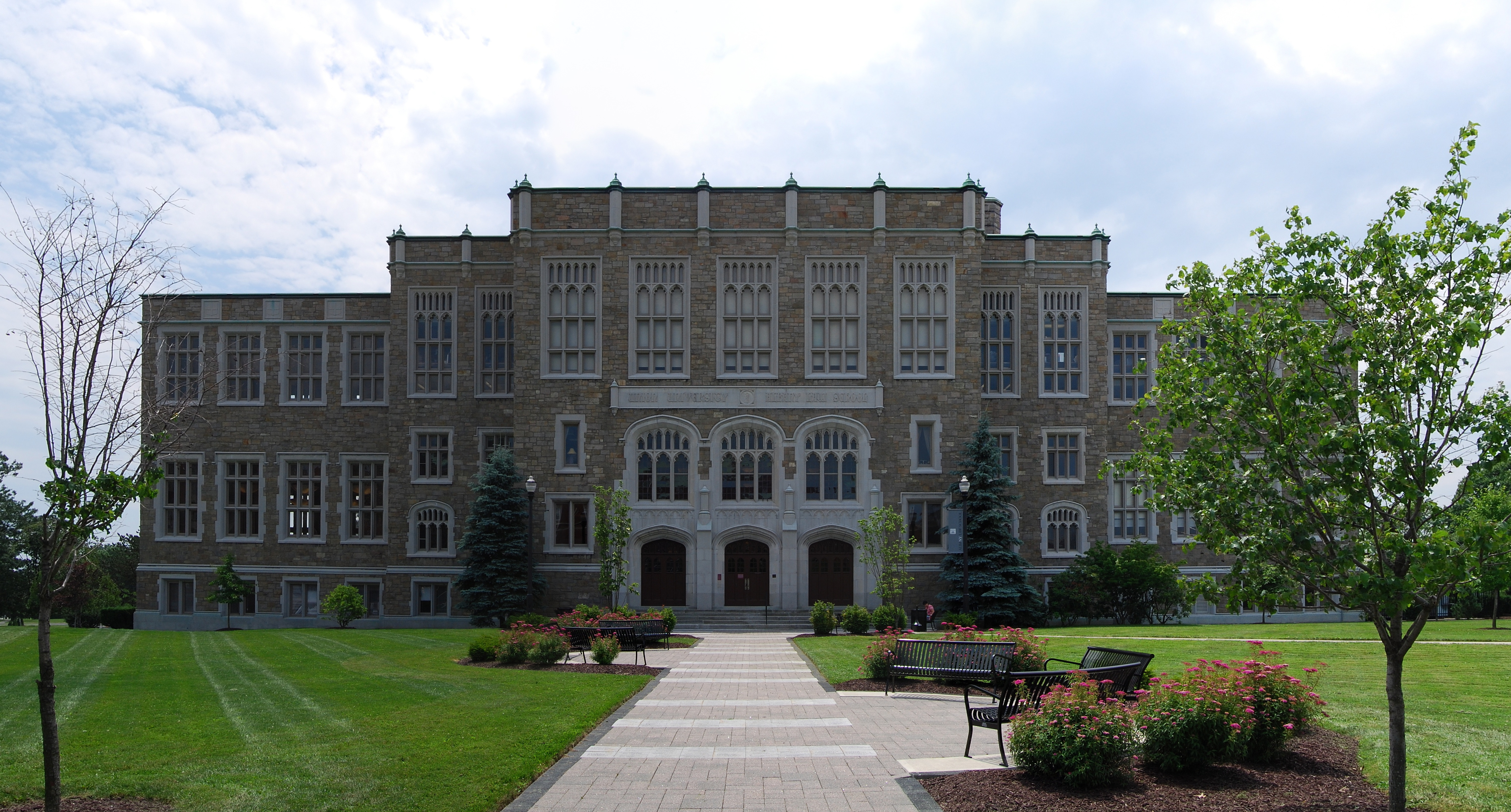
Albany Law School of Union University

On April 23, 2013, Albany Law School hosted a seminar at the New York State Capitol on the future of the State Energy Highway.

=== Benefits in NY law ===
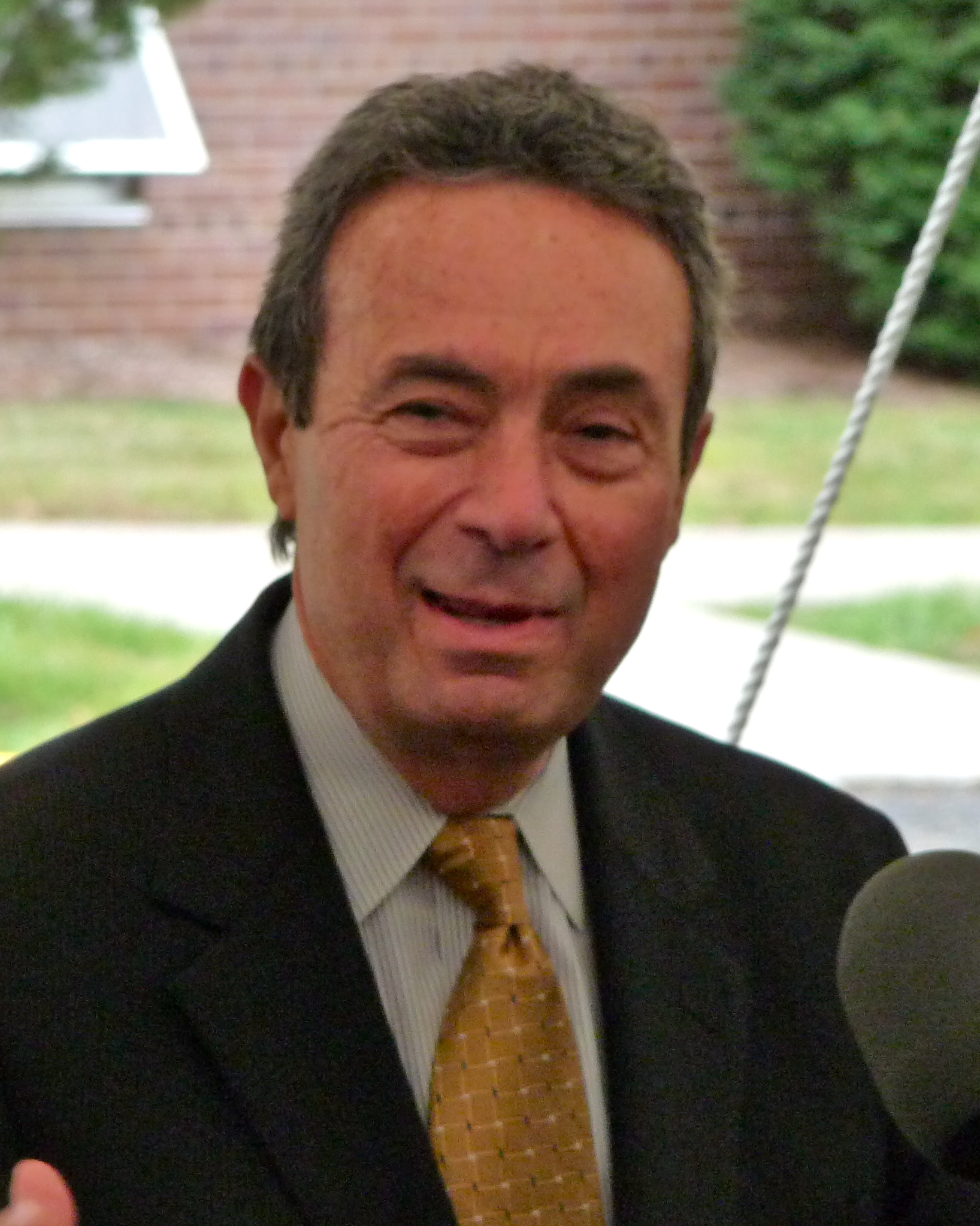
Ronald Canestrari in 2009

Assemblyman Ronald Canestrari announced the expansion of New York's Home Energy Assistance Program (HEAP) "to help additional households meet their home heating needs...."

In his 2014 State of the State address, Governor Cuomo pushed for more renewable energy benefits. This resulted in NYSERDA's "Renewable Heat NY" that provides subsidies for wood pellet burners.

== Energy-related authorities ==
=== NYSERDA ===
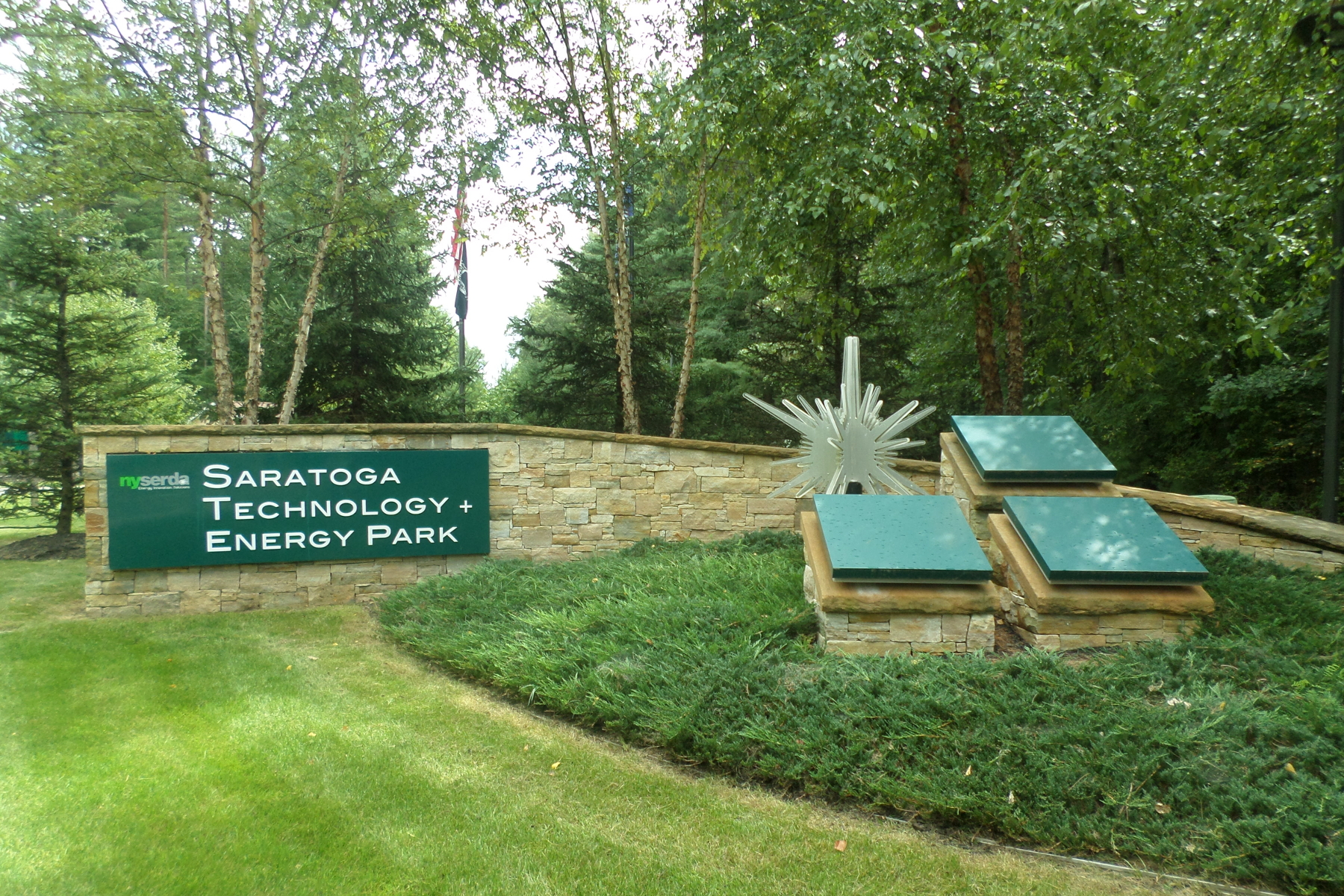
NYSERDA Saratoga Technology + Energy Park (STEP), Malta, New York

The chief regulator for the Energy Law is the "Commissioner" or "president" of the New York State Energy Research and Development Authority (also called NYSERDA). The board of directors of NYSERDA includes—as a matter of law – several utility insiders, as well as ex officio commissioners. Richard Kauffman is chairman of the board, and Alicia Barton has been President and CEO since June 2017.

NYSERDA was created as a public benefit corporation under NY law.

The regulations governing NYSERDA may be found at Parts 500–506 of the Code of Rules and Regulations. There are procedures for minutes of meetings and approval of actions by the Governor pursuant to law. There are specific regulations for accessing public meeting records pursuant to Freedom of Information Acts. Generators of low-level radioactive waste must make reports to NYSERDA. Any "action" of the Authority is subject to the state Environmental Quality Review Act (SEQRA). Other regulations include provisions for prompt payment of accounts payable, a privacy policy, and the purchase of energy efficient products.

NYSERDA funds a program, with the Farm Bureau, to assist farmers to make electricity from cow manure, or more formally, "to install anaerobic digester gas-to-electric facilities on farms".

=== NYISO ===
New York has an independent system operator, the New York Independent System Operator (NYISO). The NYISO is the 501(c)(3) nonprofit quasi-governmental agency charged by New York with auctions of energy supplies. Specifically, the NYISO:

"operates New York's bulk electricity grid, administers the state's wholesale electricity markets, and provides comprehensive reliability planning for the state's bulk electricity system. A not-for-profit corporation, the NYISO began operating in 1999."

— NYISO statement of purposes

The NYISO also organizes symposia on New York energy law. The current chairperson of the board is Ave Bie. Effective June 1, 2019, The New York Independent System Operator (NYISO) announced that its Board of Directors named Richard J. Dewey, to be President and Chief Executive Officer,

The NYISO is subject to regulation by the legislature. The NYISO is also regulated by the Federal Energy Regulatory Commission.

Based on its 2016 annual report, the NYISO received $156 million in revenue from its rate schedule 1 tariff charge applied to market participants on a $/MWh basis throughout the year. It also received $5.46 million from planning studies revenue. The 2016 NYISO expenditures included $81.4 million for compensation, $23.3 million for professional fees and consultants, and $19.4 million for maintenance, software licenses, and facility costs. About $170 million worth of assets was listed as software developed for internal use prior to calculating accumulated depreciation.

The NYISO is governed by a system of committees - similar in many ways to the organization of Standard Oil and its trusts in the years 1879–1885.

The management committee's by-laws were last updated on March 13, 2013. The public may only attend sessions of the management committee in person, and must register with the secretary beforehand. The public may not participate in the governance process. All motions to be acted on must receive a 58% vote to pass. Voting is conducted using a show-of-hands unless members prefer a roll call or secret ballot vote. All officer elections will be conducted by secret ballot voting. The five voting sectors of the management committee are generation owners, other suppliers, transmission owners, end-use consumers, and public power entities. The mentioned voting sectors are allocated with 21.5%, 21.5%, 20%, 20%, and 17% of the total vote, respectively. A quorum of at least three sectors must be present for a vote. The management committee can enter into an executive session upon a 58% vote during a meeting, or upon an anonymous request beforehand. In the executive session, non-voting ISO members, the FERC and the NYSPSC are excluded.

=== New York State Reliability Council ===
The New York State Reliability Council is a non-profit organization that provides the NYISO reliability specifications on an annual basis. These specifications impact the amount of resources that are required in the NYISO's capacity market. The council is governed by an executive committee of thirteen members: six from the state's transmission owner sector, one from the generation owner sector, one from the large consumers sector, one from the municipal and electric cooperative sector, and four without affiliations to any wholesale market participants. In 2014, the NYSRC had a budget of $761,000.

=== New York Public Service Commission ===
The New York Public Service Commission is a government agency that regulates the various utilities of the state of New York. Its regulations are contained in title 16 of the New York Codes, Rules and Regulations (Public Service Law).

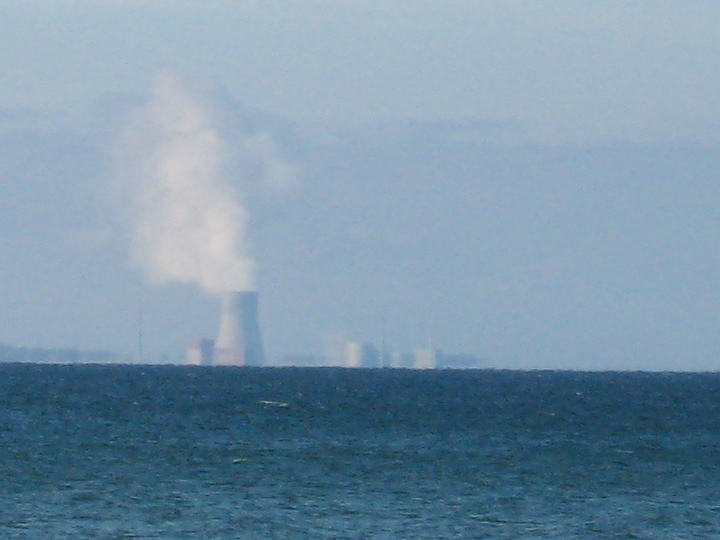
Nine Mile Point Nuclear Generating Station, seen from afar

In 2016, the Commission adopted a Clean Energy Standard, to assist in achieving the state's target of obtaining 50% of its electricity from renewable and nuclear sources by 2030, which will see customer bills increase to support these sources. A particular aim was to support three nuclear plants, Ginna, James A. FitzPatrick and Nine Mile Point that had become uneconomic; the support for nuclear is expected to cost $1 billion in the first two years.

The commission has employed and been influenced by an array of interesting personnel: a former Weather Underground member, political insiders, and industry insiders - including an at least one industry insider whose parent was an employee of the commission.

=== Power Authority of the State of New York ===
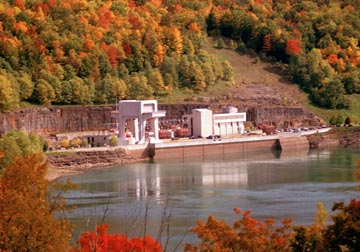
Blenheim–Gilboa Hydroelectric Power Station, operated by New York Power Authority, seen from afar

The regulations governing the Power Authority of the State of New York may be found at Parts 450–463 of the Code of Rules and Regulations.

The Power Authority's proposed contract to buy hydroelectric power from the Canadian province of Quebec has generated controversy. The Sierra Club, the Innu community, and the National Lawyers Guild are fighting to prevent the proposed contract, which would have to be approved by Governor Paterson under his regulatory authority.

The Power Authority has been criticized by scholars for "missed opportunities" in using its administrative powers.

=== Long Island Power Authority ===
The Long Island Power Authority owns the electric transmission and distribution infrastructure on a large portion of Long Island. Daily operations are managed by PSEG Long Island, a subsidiary of Public Service Enterprise Group.

== Secondary sources ==
=== History ===
New York has long taxed and regulated energy sources and utilities.

In the early 1930s, Governor Franklin Delano Roosevelt used the state's gasoline tax to fund farm to market roads.

=== Scholarship and research ===
The Fordham Environmental Law Journal hosted a panel about the siting of electric generators in New York City under New York energy law.

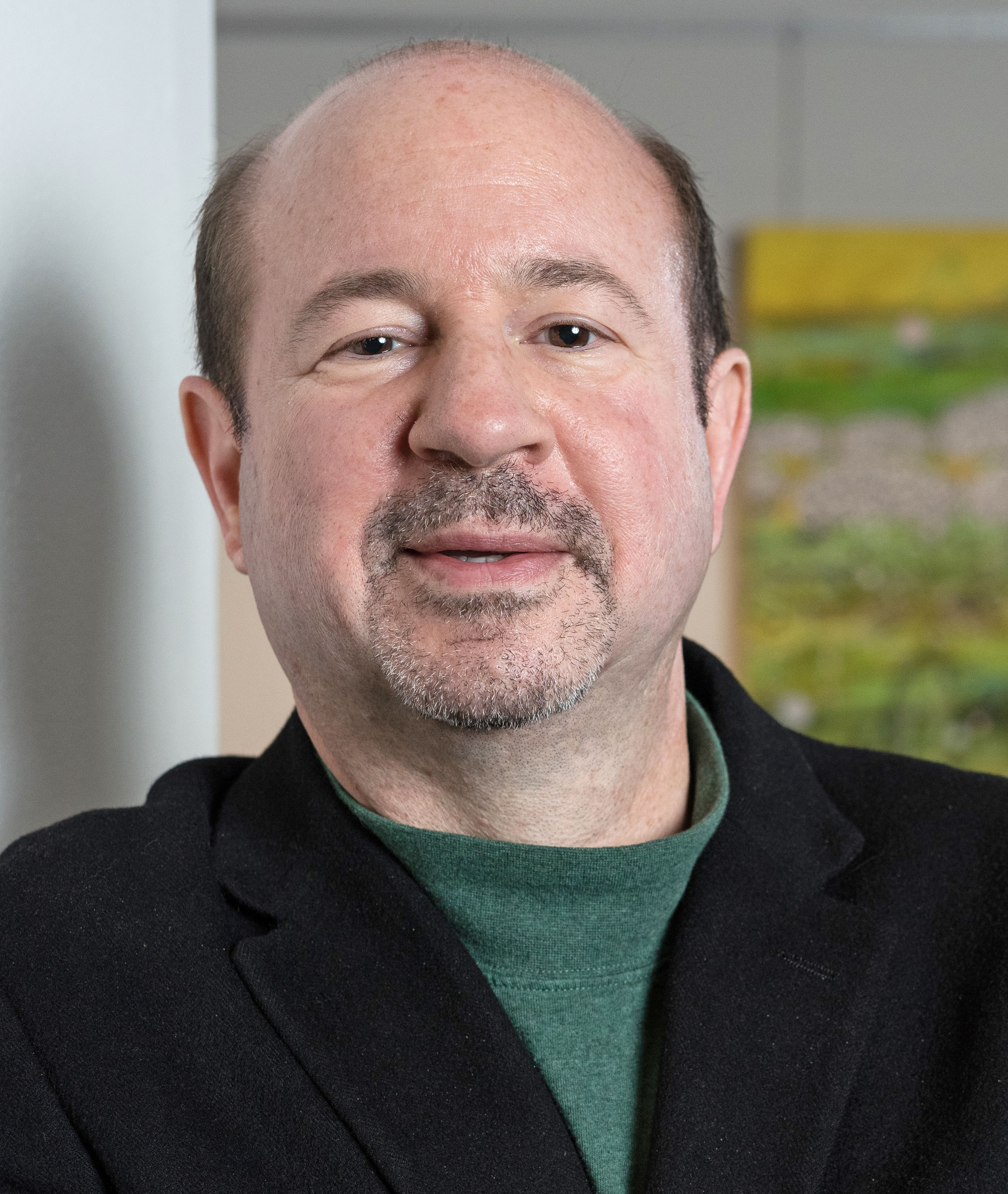
American physicist and climatologist, Michael E. Mann, in 2019

Climatologist Michael Mann spoke at Union College in October 2012 about the public policy issues involved with climate change.

The New York State Bar Association offered a continuing legal education class in 2012 on "Marcellus Shale: New Regulations and Challenges", which is available as of February 2014 as an audio course. A panel of "multidisciplinary faculty of professionals addresse[d] the new body of law being created in New York to address the substantial development that is expected in the Marcellus Shale region". NYSBA's environmental law section followed up in May 2014 with a legislative forum on the regulation of rail cars carrying shale oil through cities such as Albany.

=== Lobbying ===
The energy industry is represented by the Energy Association of New York, which lobbies on behalf of the state's larger energy-producing corporations and utilities. Wholesale electric power suppliers of New York are represented by The Independent Power Producers of New York, Inc. (IPPNY) Large industrial electric consumers are represented by Multiple Intervenors. Electric utility companies are represented by New York Transco or by themselves. The law firm Whiteman Osterman & Hanna is known for having employed, Todd Howe, bagman for Joe Percoco. One of their senior counsel was a former chairman of the New York State Public Service Commission and is currently general counsel to the New York State Reliability Council.

=== Ethics guidelines ===
A total of 17 wind energy companies have agreed to a set of ethics guidelines, which will delineate the companies' relationships with employee, contractors, and local governments. Governor Andrew Cuomo announced that 14 companies had joined the Wind Industry Ethics Code in August 2009, joining three others who had signed on earlier, in 2008–2009.

=== LEED ===
Many buildings in New York state have achieved high LEED status, which earns their owners grants or tax abatements, including the Empire State Building and the Hearst Tower.

The standards are actually promulgated by a non-governmental organization (NGO), the Green Building Certification Institute.

== Hydrofracking ==
The myriad legal issues concerning hydrofracking in New York has spawned a whole body of law, with primary authorities such as case law, statutes, and zoning regulations, as well as secondary sources such as law review and newspaper articles, on this rapidly changing field of law.

=== Court cases and analysis ===
==== Dryden and Middletown ====
In February 2012, two cases of first impression, Anschutz Exploration Corp. v. Town of Dryden and Cooperstown Holstein Corp. v. Town of Middletown, dealt with the issue of whether towns in New York can use local zoning laws to ban hydrofracking, within their police powers, or whether such action would be preempted by N.Y. Environmental Conservation Law § 23-0303 (2). In each of these two cases, New York Supreme Court ruled in favor of the defendant towns, that the state Oil, Gas, and Solution Mining Law's superseding language did not preempt their zoning laws.

The legal and political issues raised by these explosive cases were the subject of a seminar organized on February 28, 2012 by the Albany Law School.

The Anschutz case got the most publicity and analysis in the immediate aftermath, because it was decided a week earlier than the Cooperstown court. Opponents of hydrofacking "emerged trimphant" after winning Anschutz. Justice Phillip R. Rumsey relied in part on cases from Colorado that allowed local governments to regulate gas drilling, as well as from Pennsylvania, which concerned the very same Marcellus shale that is being drilled in Upstate New York. Anschutz distinguished this zoning situation from a bonding requirement, which is a direct regulation of the industry that is preempted by the N.Y. Department of Environmental Conservation's permit fees and regulatory scheme. That court also relied on cases that allowed "exclusionary zoning" that prohibits of "natural resources within the town as a permitted use if limiting that use is a reasonable exercise of its police powers ...."

In Cooperstown, a farmer named Jennifer Huntington leased 400 acres of her land for natural drilling, and she sued after the town changed its zoning laws to ban fracking. This case has a similar outcome; the town of Middlefield won at the trial court level, in a decision by Acting Justice Daniel F. Cerio. An attorney at Earthjustice lauded the Cooperstown decision, while the attorney who had represented Anschutz criticized both decisions.

Since both courts are within the Third Department of the Appellate Division, and they would be appealed, they were to be consolidated upon appeal. Attorneys for the town of Dryden indicated they are in the process of perfecting the appeal as of September 2012. While Albany Times-Union columnist Fred LeBrun noted that while opponents are expecting a win, "plenty in our government" predict a successful appeal, so he "wouldn't bet either way". However, two bloggers noted that the appeals have not been perfected as of August 2012. Searches of the website for, and an inquiry into, the Third Department shows that neither losing party has perfected their appeals as of October 17, 2012.

Further complicating the appeals, Norse Energy has also become involved in the Anschutz case. Back in October 2011, Norse Energy put up their leases for sale, claiming the moratorium by Governor Paterson had hurt the international company's prospects. Instead, Norse bought Anschutz's leases, and thus would have to be replaced as lead plaintiff against the Town of Dryden. Norse Energy's attorneys appear to be arguing that a "greater good" will come about if they are allowed to drill despite the local government's opportunity.

On March 21, 2013, the Third Department issued their ruling in Matter of Norse Energy Corp. USA v. Town of Dryden, upholding the decision of the N.Y. Supreme Court. For a unanimous court, Presiding Justice Karen A. Peters upheld the lower court's denial of intervenor status for the environmental group, DRAC, and the constitutionality of the Town of Dryden's zoning ordinance. The Court allowed Norse Energy to be substituted for Anschutz. "As a preliminary matter," they approved "Supreme Court's denial of DRAC's motion to intervene", based on the group's failing to prove "a substantial interest ... different from other residents of the Town". Rather, noting the Town could do a good job at defending its interests, instead granted amicus status to DRAC and a half dozen others. Citing the New York State Constitution and four New York Court of Appeals cases, the Third Department noted that the state's local governments have broad home rule powers under its state constitution. It agreed with the lower court that the local law is not pre-empted, either expressly or by implication.

On June 30, 2014, the New York Court of Appeals upheld the local zoning ordinances, as well as the lower court cases that had allowed them, in a 5-2 decision authored by Judge Victoria Graffeo.

==== Other cases ====
In July 2012, Lenape Resources, a natural gas drilling company, threatened to sue state and local governments over a hydrofracking ban by the town of Avon.

Also in July 2012, Justice Ferris Lebous ruled in the Broome County, New York case of Jeffrey v. Ryan that, while the city of Binghamton has the right to enact a local regulation, they did not enact a proper moratorium.

=== Administrative response ===
While those appeals were pending, The New York Times reported in mid-June 2012 that Governor Cuomo and his staff were deliberating on a plan to restrict hydrofracking to five counties in the southern tier of New York, along the Pennsylvania border, where the Marcellus shale is deepest and drilling is least likely to pollute well water supplies in those aquifers. Drilling would not be allowed in these areas:

- New York City and its watershed
- Towns that have banned or not agreed to the practice (over 100 towns and villages have banned it, but several dozen have asked for it)
- The Catskill State Park (which is 'forever wild' under the New York State Constitution)
- Areas of surface land directly over certain aquifers
- Land within National Historic Landmark Districts.

The Albany Times Union the next day filed a front-page, above the fold story questioning the plan's leak as a "trial balloon", which had quickly garnered both criticism and support.

In August 2012, LeBrun filed a column that a limited plan was moving forward to allow hydrofracking in the Southern Tier, which he characterized as the "[e]nd of the anti-frack world". Wading through 60,000 comments, the New York Department of Environmental Conservation was looking at a "ramp up" period, allowing 50 wells in 2013, and 100 wells in 2014, and only in towns that want them.

Governor Cuomo's budget did not expect any revenues from hydrofracking in fiscal year 2012–2013. There was a study that indicates that New York lacks a state tax on gas production.

Joseph Martens, the Commissioner of DEC, has overall responsibility for regulating all hydrofracking programs. Eugene Leff, his Deputy Commissioner for Remediation and Materials Management, has responsibility for "Materials Management, Environmental Remediation and Mineral Resources", which would include hydrofracking regulations, if any were to be released. Bradley Field is the Director for "Management and regulation of mineral resource development [and] Oil & Gas Regulation ... [to] Oversee permitting, compliance and enforcement of all regulated wells in New York". All media and other press inquiries must go directly through Emily DeSantis, at Press Operations, who is the Department spokesperson and who issues all press releases. Leff was one of the panelists on NYSBA's 2012 seminar on "Marcellus Shale: New Regulations and Challenges".

As of early 2014, administrative inaction lead to what the Sierra Club called a "de facto moratorium ... for new drilling of natural gas wells" in the State "using hydrofracking technology". Susan Lawrence, writing an open letter to the group, cited six reasons for the effective ban:

1. The DEC had "not finalized" the environmental impact statement.
2. Governor Cuomo and the DEC were waiting for the Department of Health to issue a report first.
3. The state budget for FY 2013-2014 had no funding for state employees to process the necessary applications.
4. Cuomo had stated publicly that he would not decide on the issues until after the November election.
5. The Dryden and Middletown cases were pending before the New York Court of Appeals.
6. The public had concerns in light of the recent increase in rail shipments of oil from hydraulically fractured Bakken formation wells in North Dakota through Upstate New York.

== See also ==
- Congestion pricing in New York City
- Energy law
- Environmental law
- Gasoline and diesel usage and pricing
- Green Island Power Authority
- Indian Point Energy Center
- List of years in the environment
- Nonbusiness Energy Property Tax Credit
- NRG Energy
- United States energy law
- Wind power in New York

== Bibliography ==
- Morgan, Ted (1985), FDR: A biography (popular biography), ISBN 978-0-671-45495-1
