= Cap-and-Invest =

Cap-and-Invest may refer to:

- Cap-and-Invest (Washington state)
- Cap-and-Invest (New York state)
- Carbon emission trading, commonly known as "cap-and-trade"
