= Climate Leadership and Community Protection Act =

New York State law

The Climate Leadership and Community Protection Act (CLCPA) is a plan signed into law on July 18, 2019 to address climate change and reach net zero emissions in New York State. The Act sets the goals to reduce emissions to 40% below 1990 levels by 2030 and then to 85% below 1990 levels by 2050. The remaining 15% of emissions will be offset, such as by planting trees which take carbon dioxide out of the air, to reach net zero emissions.

== Specific emission targets by sector ==
One of the main hurdles to reaching this goal is dramatically transferring the source of energy within New York State. By 2030, New York aims to get 70% its electricity from renewable sources and by 2040 the goal is to have all the state's electricity come from carbon-free sources like wind and solar energy. Some New York utility providers claim this goal is too ambitious and will result in higher bills for New York residents. In 2019, at the time of the bill's passage, about 60% of electricity within New York State was being produced by carbon-free sources, mainly hydroelectric dams and nuclear power plants.

Other sectors will also need to adapt to achieve these emissions reductions targets. As of 2020, transportation makes up one third of the state's emissions, but in 2020, the Trump administration rolled back national emissions reductions standards allowing for more pollution and challenged stricter state standards for transportation emissions. In January 2025, New York City implemented a congestion pricing plan that has helped reduce transportation emissions.

Additionally, many residential and commercial buildings use natural gas or oil to heat their homes. To reach reduction targets, New York will likely need to invest in the innovation and implementation of new heating systems powered by renewable energy sources. These measures build upon an earlier law (Local Law 97 of 2019) to reduce emissions in existing large buildings in New York City.

== Climate justice provisions ==
The plan includes certain stipulations to direct no less than 35% of the program's benefits to historically disadvantaged communities based on a number of determinants related to "public health, environmental hazards, and socioeconomic factors" and decided by the newly created Climate Justice Working Group. Additionally, the Act also aims to create a "community air monitoring program" to monitor air quality standards and pollutant levels on a community level, address air quality problems as they arise in communities affected by local air pollution, and take special care to ensure criteria pollutants are eliminated in disadvantaged communities first.

== Climate Action Council ==
The Act created a 22-member Climate Action Council to publish actionable proposals to reduce emissions to target levels within the timespan allowed. The Climate Action Council will publish their preliminary plans within two years of the CLCPA becoming law and then update their plan every five years thereafter. Every economic sector including the transportation, building, industrial, commercial, and agricultural sectors should have a customized plan with a number of strategies for reducing their sector-specific emissions.

== History ==
The CLCPA is the product of years of advocacy by New York environmentally focused community organizations to gain political support in the New York State Legislature. The CLCPA is a version of a previous bill, the Climate and Community Protection Act (CCPA). New York Renews, a coalition of over 300 "environmental, justice, faith, labor, and community groups," is cited as being instrumental in the bill's passage and was "the force behind the nation's most progressive climate law [the CLCPA]". New York Renews is now pushing for further progressive legislation to fully fund and carry out the CLCPA, incentivize the creation of new clean energy, and raise revenues by taxing polluters and the ultra-rich through the Climate, Jobs, and Justice Package (CJJP).

=== Current status ===
On March 20, 2026, Governor Kathy Hochul announced her intentions to roll back key provisions of the CLCPA, including its renewable energy targets, emissions reduction timelines, and implementation of the state's Cap-and-Invest program. Her announcement followed a February 2026 memo from the New York State Energy Research and Development Authority (NYSERDA), outlining the potential costs with achieving the CLCPA's 2030 mandates.

Hochul's announcement and the NYSERDA memo appeared to adopt similar messaging used in a months-long opposition campaign by New York's largest business association, the Business Council of New York State (BCNYS), in which the group repeatedly called on legislators to revise the climate law. In January 2026, BCNYS submitted written testimony to the New York Legislature, calling on the Public Service Commission (PSC) to "review" the CLCPA's 2030 renewable energy targets, suggesting that the mandates be modified or suspended entirely.

BCNYS highlighted its coordinated campaign with "nearly 30 other industry groups," urging the PSC to "reconsider" New York's renewable energy transition in a February 2026 op-ed, arguing that the PSC should "examine the link between renewable program costs and affordability." BCNYS promoted similar messages in a February 2026 episode of its Connect Podcast, once again calling on the PSC to "modify its renewable energy mandate and timetable," and stressing that the current goals set out by the CLCPA are "unachievable."

The group also issued a statement in response to NYSERDA's memo in February 2026, stating that "it is increasingly clear that we need the Legislature to agree to amendments to the CLCPA," emphasizing the need to "protect reliability and affordability."

=== 2027 budget amendments ===
On May 7, 2026, Governor Kathy Hochul announced an agreement with state legislators on a $268 billion budget for fiscal year 2027 that would change greenhouse emissions targets in the CLCPA. If enacted, the budget would replace the law's 2030 target of a 40% reduction in greenhouse emissions below 1990 levels; instead, it would target a 60% reduction by 2040.

== See also ==
- New York energy law
