= Au Sable Institute =

Field-based environmental group

- Au Sable Institute of Environmental Studies
- Motto: Serve. Protect. Restore.
- Abbreviation: ASI
- Named after: Au Sable River
- Formation: 1961
- Founder: Harold Snyder
- Type: Evangelical environmentalism
- Headquarters: 7526 Sunset Trail Road Northeast; Mancelona, Michigan
- Executive Director: Jon Terry
- Board Chair: Steven Bouma-Prediger
- Website: ausable.org
- Formerly called: Au Sable Trails Camp for Youth

The Au Sable Institute of Environmental Studies is an educational organization that provides field-based environmental science courses to students from participating Christian colleges.

By educating and inspiring future leaders, Au Sable has been a major player in the Creation Care movement within evangelical Christianity.

The campus is located in northern lower Michigan, outside of Mancelona, Michigan. Courses are also offered in Washington State and Costa Rica, through partnerships with other organizations.
