= Cap-and-Invest (New York state) =

Cap-and-Invest is a proposed government policy of the State of New York. It would combine a carbon emissions trading program (commonly known as cap-and-trade) with a set of climate change policies funded by the sale of carbon emission allowances and offsets. The program would provide funding and compliance rules for the Climate Leadership and Community Protection Act passed in 2019.

The statute set a deadline for NYSDEC and NYSERDA to publish their initial regulations by Jan. 1, 2024. However, as of April 2026, the regulations have not yet been published.
