= Norse Energy =

Norse Energy Corp. ASA
- Company type: Defunct
- ISIN: NO0003095507
- Industry: Petroleum
- Founded: 2005
- Fate: Bankrupted 2014
- Headquarters: Oslo, Norway
- Area served: Global
- Key people: Øivind Risberg (CEO)

Norse Energy was a petroleum and natural gas (tight gas) exploration and production as well as pipeline operator. Though based in Lysaker outside Oslo, Norway the company operated in the United States and Brazil. It went bankrupt in 2014.
