= Sunrise Earth =

- Created by: David Conover
- Starring: Nature
- Country of origin: United States
- No. of episodes: 64

Production
- Cinematography: David Conover
- Editor: Josh Povec
- Running time: approx. 50 minutes

Original release
- Network: HD Theater
- Release: September 27, 2004 – September 12, 2008

Sunrise Earth is a nature documentary television series that last aired in the United States in 2008 on HD Theater (originally Discovery HD Theater), which has since been reformatted and rebranded as Velocity. The series focused on presenting the viewer with sunrises in various geographical locations throughout the world. It is also notable for its complete lack of human narration, concentrating instead on the natural sounds of each episodes' specific location. The technique has been described by TV critic Tom Shales as "crazily uneventful and thoroughly wonderful."

== Production ==
Compass Light, Conover's small production company in Camden, Maine, started producing the series in 2004. Clint Stinchcomb helped produce the series. 64 one-hour Sunrise Earth shows were created in the first four years of production. The crew shoots with high-definition video cameras, and the editors cut between multiple perspectives at a leisurely pace. The show is presented in real-time, with each shot lasting an average of 30 seconds. Each episode captures one sunrise from a certain location, such as Machu Picchu, Turkey or Scandinavia. Captions in the lower portion of the frame occasionally give information as to the location, time, and events on screen.

== Audio ==
High-definition video and Dolby 5.1 stereo surround sound are used to present each natural environment in a clear and detailed manner. The show is an example of the genre known as "Experiential TV", developed by series creator David Conover.

== Schedule ==
Sunrise Earth aired weekdays at 7 a.m. and 10 a.m. Eastern Time on Discovery HD Theater. However, as of mid-March 2011, the show no longer airs on any channel (current or otherwise), except on Amazon Prime, and is rumored to have been cancelled, though no official word from Discovery or Compass Light has confirmed this.

All three seasons were made available on Amazon Prime.

== Reception ==
Ross McCammon of Esquire said the show "will relax and reset you", calling it "an antidote not only to everything else happening on TV that night but to everything else that happened to you that day". The Tampa Tribune's Kurt Loft wrote, "For eye-popping visuals in the HD format, Sunrise Earth is a world unto itself."

== Episode list ==
- Season 1
1. Moose in the Morning
2. Yellowstone Geysers
3. Gator Hole
4. Bison Before Breakfast
5. Sea of Terns
6. Vermont Balloons
7. Alewife Eternal Return
8. Tropical Palms
9. Swallow Sea Cave
10. Yosemite Dawn
11. Cribworks Kayak
12. Sequoia Light
13. Sunrise Seal Colony
14. Lobster Village
15. Western Ranch
16. Everglades River of Grass
17. Wildflower Elk
18. Edge of Atlantic
19. Milk Cows in the Morning
20. San Francisco Tai Chi
21. Teton Beaver
22. Manatee Spring
23. Island First Light
24. Greatest Hits East
25. Greatest Hits West
- Season 2
26. Katmai Bears
27. Volcano Lagoon
28. Homer Takeoff
29. Ninagiak Island
30. Glacier of Kenai Fjords
- Season 3
31. Mayan Pyramid
32. Birds of Palo Verde
33. Cloudforest Waterfall
34. Playa Grande Moonset
35. Dawn of Cerro de La Muerte
36. Angkor Temples of Khmer Kings
37. Li River Cormorants
38. Ping An Rice Paddies
39. Buddhists of Wat Svay
40. Elephant Trunk Park
41. Scandinavian Waterfall
42. Foothills of Turkey
43. Stonehenge Dawn
44. Mediterranean Port
45. Icelandic Geysir
46. Argentinean Seal Pups
47. Peruvian Rainforest Canopy
48. Andean Dawn at Machu Picchu
49. Amazon Parakeets
50. Patagonian Penguins
51. Christmas Lights
52. Total Eclipse
53. Polar Bears
54. Secrets of the Sun (special documentary)
- Season 4 – Viewers Choice
55. The Skelligs of Ireland
56. Great Barrier Reef
57. Haleakala Crater
58. Society Island Sunrise
59. New Zealand Frost
- Season 5 – Viewers Choice II
60. Japanese Garden
61. High Desert Arches
62. Midnight Sun of Svalbard
63. Vancouver Inside Passage
64. Venetian Canals
