= The Ocean Foundation =

US-based non-profit organization

- Formation: 2002
- Founder: Wolcott Henry
- Type: Non-profit environmental organization
- Tax ID no.: 71-0863908
- Headquarters: Washington, D.C.
- President: Mark J. Spalding
- Website: oceanfdn.org

The Ocean Foundation is a 501(c)(3) community foundation, based in Washington, D.C., and established in 2002. Its mission is "to support, strengthen, and promote those organizations dedicated to reversing the trend of destruction of ocean environments around the world."

== About and history ==
The Ocean Foundation was founded by underwater photographer Wolcott Henry. It began as the Coral Reef Foundation with "a group of like-minded coral conservation experts, venture capitalists and philanthropy colleagues...providing both expert advice about conservation projects and easy mechanisms for giving". The Coral Reef Foundation then changed its mission in 2003 to support all ocean conservation efforts, and was renamed The Ocean Foundation. 2022 marked The Ocean Foundation's 20th year in business.

Under the community foundation model, The Ocean Foundation hosts donor-advised funds, pooled funds, and funders collaboratives as a grantmaking facility, and receives grants through donors and corporations. The Ocean Foundation partners with corporations and organizations for proceeds-of-sale and ocean and marine initiatives, and holds a Fiscal Sponsorship Program for ocean and marine-related projects. The organization also provides counseling services.

== Focus areas ==
Four initiatives have been launched at The Ocean Foundation to "fill gaps in conservation work"

- Blue Resilience Initiative – Focused on coastal restoration and resilience, The Ocean Foundation helps ecosystems by focusing on blue carbon projects and carbon offsets. Its Blue Resilience Initiative committed to investing in coastal habitat conservation, restoration, and agroforestry in Mexico, the Dominican Republic, Cuba, and Saint Kitts and Nevis. The Ocean Foundation has also had restoration projects in Puerto Rico, in partnership with the Jobos Bay National Estuarine Research Reserve; and in Xcalak Reefs National Park, with the Mexican Commission for Protected Areas (CONANP) and other partners. Through The Ocean Foundation's partnership with World Resources Institute and Fundación Mexicana del Océano, a report was also issued on the prioritization and monitoring strategies for mangroves in Tuxpan, Veracruz and Celestún, Yucatán. Under the Blue Resilience Initiative, The Ocean Foundation developed a blue carbon offset program called "SeaGrass Grow". A recent project of the Blue Resilience Initiative involves restoring mangroves at Mata Redonda in Salinas, Puerto Rico.
- Community Ocean Engagement Global Initiative – Focused on ocean literacy, the Communication Ocean Engagement Global Initiative was launched on World Ocean Day on June 8, 2022 to help marine education community leaders and students learn more about conservation.
- International Ocean Acidification Initiative – Focused on ocean science capacity, The Ocean Foundation's International Ocean Acidification Initiative works to increase capacity for ocean acidification monitoring and reporting. In the Pacific Islands, The Ocean Foundation helped to establish the Pacific Islands Ocean Acidification Centre (PIOAC), a regional center led by The Pacific Community. PIOAC hosts kits and spare parts for scientists, as well as data expertise and training under Sustainable Development Goal 14.3.1. The Ocean Foundation also recently held an ocean acidification workshop in Salinas, Puerto Rico.
- Plastics Initiative – Focused on marine plastic pollution, The Ocean Foundation's Plastics Initiative works on bringing non-profit policy perspectives into the Global Plastic Pollution Treaty discussion. The Ocean Foundation's Plastics Initiative was quoted in an August 2022 Business Insider article about a "high-ambition" coalition that seeks to end plastic pollution by 2040, stating that "recycling alone won't solve the plastic waste problem."

== Fiscal sponsorship program ==
The Ocean Foundation hosts fiscally sponsored projects using themes such as ocean literacy, species protection, habitat conservation, and capacity building.

A few hosted projects include:

- International Fisheries Conservation Program – In 2019, the International Fisheries Conservation Project, a project of The Ocean Foundation, was founded for management of marine fisheries. In October of 2019, NPR published a story about a study that detailed the amount of tuna taken from the ocean, and Global Tuna Conservation Project Director Shana Miller commented on the study. Shana Miller also co-wrote an article in April 2022 for The Pew Charitable Trusts about science-based management and fisheries.
- SEVENSEAS Media: Founded in 2015 by conservation biologist Giacomo Abrusci, SEVENSEAS Media is an independent nonprofit media organization and knowledge hub for ocean conservation. The organization operates a monthly digital magazine, weekly newsletter, and what it describes as the largest ocean conservation jobs board, which has been in continuous operation since 2004. In 2019, Abrusci received the Blue Ambassador of the Year Award at Loggerhead Marinelife Center's Go Blue Awards. As of 2025, SEVENSEAS Media reaches over 36,000 subscribers globally.
- Shark Advocates International – Founded by President Sonja Fordham, this project of The Ocean Foundation has a mission of conserving and protecting shark species by collaborating with organizations and decision makers. In January 2021, Fordham was quoted in an article about fishing and its correlation with shark and ray populations.
