= Local Law 97 of 2019 =

New York City Council
- Territorial extent: Whole of New York City
- Enacted by: New York City Council
- Enacted: March 2019
- Status: In force

Local Law No 97 of 2019, passed as a part of the Climate Mobilization Act by the New York City Council in March 2019, requires large (over 25,000 square feet in 2017) existing buildings in New York City reduce their emissions by 40% by 2030 and 80% by 2050. This law is unique and novel in its aim, because it targets existing buildings and requires owners to invest in renovation and retrofitting to make their buildings more energy efficient. Other similar laws have been passed worldwide, but target only new construction projects. The New York Post has called the law "one of the most ambitious climate legislations for buildings enacted by any city in the world."

This law reflects the city's aim to reduce overall emissions by 80% by 2050. All buildings (residential and non-residential) account for 71% of New York City greenhouse gas emissions, and the large existing buildings affected by this law alone account for about 30% of citywide emissions. The law also aligns with and begins to implement plans laid out by New York US representative Alexandria Ocasio-Cortez in the Green New Deal legislation co-sponsored by Senator Markey.

The law is estimated to cost businesses about $4 billion USD, but some of those costs will likely create future energy savings. Some of the retrofits buildings can consider implementing to abide by the new law could include investing in better insulated windows, dimmable lights, more efficient air conditioners and heating systems. This law affects 50,000 of New York City's 1 million buildings.

Under a scheme initiated by Mayor Eric Adams in 2023, landlords can buy credits to avoid complying with the requirements of the law. The minimum purchase under the credits scheme is 1000 credits at a cost of US$35.52 each and took effect in August 2026.
